= Dion Graham =

American actor

- Occupations: Actor, narrator
- Years active: 1992–present

Dion Graham is an American actor and narrator. As an actor, he has worked both on and off-Broadway, as well as in TV series and film. As of April 2024, he has narrated at least 280 audiobooks. He has earned a place on AudioFile magazine's list of Golden Voice Narrators, as well as Audible's Narrator Hall of Fame. Further, he has won 11 Audie Awards, 71 Earphone Awards, 3 Listen-Up Awards, and 1 Odyssey Award.

Book Riot called Graham "the best of the best" in audiobook narration, saying, "His voice is rich and emotive, making even the driest bits of a long biography or history come alive. His ability to inhabit characters seems limitless; his myriad character accents are always flawless."

== Biography ==
Graham grew up in Cincinnati and lives in New York City.

His on-screen acting career began in 1992 when he played a role in Malcolm X. Throughout the 1990s, he appeared in other shows, such as Law & Order, and performed on- and off-Broadway.

Graham highlights two key moments in his life as being influential to his career as an audiobook narrator. First, a roommate of his requested that he record James Joyce’s story "The Dead" for a long road trip. Months later, Graham listened to the recording and found it "compelling"; he also remembered enjoying the process of recording the story. A few years later, Graham was performing a Tennessee Williams play at the Royal National Theatre when an acquaintance encouraged him to consider audiobooks. His first audiobook narration was published in 2000.

Since 2000, Graham has given voice to many Black characters and narrated classic works by African American authors, including Langston Hughes's The Weary Blues, Martin Luther King Jr.'s Letter from Birmingham Jail, James Baldwin's Going to Meet the Man, and Chester Himes's The Big Gold Dream. He has also narrated more recent novels, such as What Strange Paradise by the Egyptian-Canadian writer Omar El Akkad, a book about a young Syrian refugee.

Throughout his career as an audiobook narrator, Graham has continued to act both on- and off-screen, including television shows such as The Wire, The Good Wife, and Madam Secretary.

== Awards and honors ==
Graham has been listed on AudioFile magazine's list of Golden Voice Narrators, as well as Audible's Narrator Hall of Fame. In 2012, Booklist honored him with a Voice of Choice award. He has been named Publishers Weekly's Narrator of the Year, and his narrations have landed on many "best of" lists.

Further, he has won 11 Audie Awards, 71 Earphone Awards, 3 Listen-Up Awards, and 1 Odyssey Award.

=== 2000s ===
==== Awards ====
Year	Title	Author(s)	Other narrator(s)	Award	Result	Ref.
2002	Bombingham (2001)	Anthony Grooms		Earphones Award	Won	
2002	West of Rehoboth (2001)	Alexs D. Pate		Earphones Award	Won	
2005	I Got Somebody in Staunton (2005)	William Henry Lewis	Kevin R. Free, Lizan Mitchell, and Ezra Knight	Earphones Award	Won	
2006	Dancing in the Dark (2005)	Caryl Phillips		Earphones Award	Won	
2006	River Rising (2005)	Athol Dickson		Earphones Award	Won	
2007	Death by Black Hole: And Other Cosmic Quandaries (2007)	Neil DeGrasse Tyson		Earphones Award	Won	
2008	Cadillac Orpheus	Solon Timothy Woodward		Listen-Up Award for Fiction	Finalist	
2008	Chasing the Devil's Tail: A Mystery of Storyville, New Orleans	David Fulmer		Earphones Award	Won	
2008	Pepperfish Keys (2007)	Darryl Wimberley		Earphones Award	Won	
2008	River Rising	Athol Dickson		Audie Award for Faith-Based Fiction and Nonfiction	Won	
2009	Time Traveler: A Scientist's Personal Mission to Make Time Travel a Reality (2007)	Ronald L. Mallett and Bruce Henderson		Earphones Award	Won	
2009	The Way Home (2009)	George Pelecanos		Earphones Award	Won	

==== Best of the Year Lists ====
Year	Title	Author(s)	List	Ref.
2007	What is the What (2006)	Dave Eggers	AudioFile Best Fiction	
2008	Chasing the Devil’s Tail		AudioFile Best Mystery & Suspense	
2009	The Way Home (2009)	George Pelecanos	AudioFile Best Mystery and Suspense	

=== 2010s ===
==== Awards ====
Year	Title	Author(s)	Other narrator(s)	Award	Result	Ref.
2010	A Heartbreaking Work of Staggering Genius (2000)	Dave Eggers		Earphones Award	Won	
2010	Peace, Locomotion	Jacqueline Woodson		Audie Award for Young Adult Title	Won	
2010	Peace, Locomotion	Jacqueline Woodson		Odyssey Award	Honor	
2010	The Rock and the River (2010)	Kekla Magoon		Earphones Award	Won	
2010	We Are the Ship: The Story of Negro League Baseball	Kadir Nelson		Odyssey Award	Honor	
2010	You Shall Know Our Velocity! (2003)	Dave Eggers		Earphones Award	Won	
2011	The Big Gold Dream (1960)	Chester Himes		Earphones Award	Won	
2011	Black Jack: The Ballad of Jack Johnson (2010)	Charles R. Smith, Jr.		Earphones Award	Won	
2011	The Blueprint	Kirk Franklin		Audie Award for Faith-Based Fiction and Nonfiction	Finalist	
2011	Going to Meet the Man (1957)	James Baldwin		Earphones Award	Won	
2011	Here in Harlem: Poems in Many Voices (2010)	Walter Dean Myers	Muhammad Cunningham, Michael Early, Patricia R. Floyd, Kevin R. Free, Arthur French, Nathan Hinton, Ezra Knight, Robin Miles, Lizan Mitchell, Gail Nelson, Monica Patton, and Charles Turner	Earphones Award	Won	
2011	The Legend of Bass Reeves: Being the True and Fictional Account of the Most Valiant Marshal in the West (2006)	Gary Paulsen		Earphones Award	Won	
2011	Looking Like Me	Walter Dean Myers	Quincy Tyler Bernstine	Earphones Award	Won	
2011	The Rock and the River (2010)	Kekla Magoon		Amazing Audiobooks for Young Adults	Top 10	
2011	The Rock and the River (2010)	Kekla Magoon		Audie Award for Young Adult Title	Won	
2011	William's Leap For Freedom	Renee Pringle (adaptation) with assistance by Sue Zizza	Mirron E. Willis and a full cast	Audie Award for Original Work	Finalist	
2011	Pick-Up: A Full Day of Full Court (2011)	Marc Aronson , Charles R. Smith Jr., Walter Dean Myers, Bruce Brooks, Willie Perdomo, Robert Burleigh, Rita Williams-Garcia, Joseph Bruchac, and Adam Rapp	Quincy Tyler Bernstine	Earphones Award	Won	
2011	Swordspoint: A Melodrama of Manners	Ellen Kushner	Ellen Kushner , Katherine Kellgren, Robert Fass, Nick Sullivan, Simon Jones, Sam Guncler, and Anne Bobby	Earphones Award	Won	
2012	Astray	Emma Donoghue	Khristine Hvam, James Langton, Robert Petkoff, and Suzanne Toren	Earphones Award	Won	
2012	Black Jack: The Ballad of Jack Johnson (2010)	Charles R. Smith, Jr.		Audie Award for Young Listeners' Title	Finalist	
2012	Going to Meet the Man (1957)	James Baldwin		Audie Award for Solo Narration – Male	Finalist	
2012	Hologram for the King	Dave Eggers		Listen-Up Award for Fiction	Finalist	
2012	Locomotion	Jacqueline Woodson		Earphones Award	Won	
2012	Looking Like Me	Walter Dean Myers	Quincy Tyler Bernstine	Audie Award for Young Listeners' Title	Finalist	
2012	Miles: The Autobiography (1989)	Miles Davis and Quincy Troupe		Earphones Award	Won	
2012	Miles: The Autobiography (1989)	Miles Davis and Quincy Troupe		Listen-Up Award for Audiobook of the Year	Won	
2012	Miles: The Autobiography (1989)	Miles Davis and Quincy Troupe		Listen-Up Award for Audiobook Reader of the Year	Won	
2012	Miles: The Autobiography (1989)	Miles Davis and Quincy Troupe		Listen-Up Award for Nonfiction	Won	
2012	Pick-Up Game	Marc Aronson and Charles R. Smith Jr., et al.	Quincy Tyler	Audie Award for Young Adult Title	Finalist	
2013	Astray	Emma Donoghue	Khristine Hvam, James Langton, Robert Petkoff, and Suzanne Toren	Audie Award for Short Stories or Collections	Won	
2013	Letter from a Birmingham Jail	Martin Luther King, Jr.		Listen-Up Award for Audiobook of the Year	Finalist	
2013	Letter from a Birmingham Jail	Martin Luther King, Jr.		Listen-Up Award for Nonfiction	Finalist	
2013	Miles: The Autobiography (1989)	Miles Davis and Quincy Troupe		American Library Association Listen List	Won	
2013	Swordspoint: A Melodrama of Manners	Ellen Kushner	Ellen Kushner , Katherine Kellgren, Robert Fass, Nick Sullivan, Simon Jones, Sam Guncler, and Anne Bobby	Audie Award for Audio Drama	Finalist	
2013	We Are America	Walter Dean Myers	MacLeod Andrews, Olivia DuFord, Lizan Mitchell, Christopher Myers, Walter Dean Myers, Johanna Parker, Adriana Sananes, and Kaipo Schwab	Audie Award for Distinguished Achievement in Production	Finalist	
2013	We Are America	Walter Dean Myers	MacLeod Andrews, Olivia DuFord, Lizan Mitchell, Christopher Myers, Walter Dean Myers, Johanna Parker, Adriana Sananes, and Kaipo Schwab	Audie Award for Young Listeners' Title	Finalist	
2014	H.O.R.S.E.: A Game of Basketball and Imagination (2012)	Christopher Myers		Earphones Award	Won	
2014	Letter from a Birmingham Jail	Martin Luther King, Jr.		Audie Award for Original Work	Finalist	
2014	METAtropolis: Green Space	Jay Lake, et al.	Robin Miles, Mark Boyett, Scott Brick, Allyson Johnson, Sanjiv Jhaveri, Jennifer Van Dyck, and Jonathan Davis	Audie Award for Original Work	Finalist	
2015	28 Days: Moments in Black History that Changed the World (2015)	Charles R. Smith, Jr.	William Jackson Harper, Zainab Jah, January LaVoy, Robin Miles, Lizan Mitchell, Jonathan Earl Peck, and Carter Woodson Redwood	Earphones Award	Won	
2015	Book: My Autobiography (2014)	John Agard		Earphones Award	Won	
2015	Five Pieces of Jade (1972)	John Ball		Earphones Award	Won	
2015	H.O.R.S.E.: A Game of Basketball and Imagination (2012)	Christopher Myers		Odyssey Award	Won	
2015	Midnight in the Garden of Good and Evil (1994)	John Berendt	Dylan Baker, Laverne Cox, Barbara Rosenblat, and a full cast	Earphones Award	Won	
2015	The Swords of Riverside	Ellen Kushner and Delia Sherman	Ellen Kushner , Barbara Rosenblat, Katherine Kellgren, Simon Jones	Audie Award for Audio Drama	Finalist	
2015	X: A Novel	Ilyasah Shabazz and Kekla Magoon	Ilyasah Shabazz	Earphones Award	Won	
2016	Grimms Fairy Tales (1812)	Brothers Grimm	Jim Dale, Janis Ian, Alfred Molina, Katherine Kellgren, and a full cast	Earphones Award	Won	
2016	Jump Back, Paul: The Life and Poems of Paul Laurence Dunbar	Sally Derby	Bahni Turpin	Audie Award for Middle Grade Title	Finalist	
2016	My Name is Not Friday (2016)	Jon Walter		Earphones Award	Won	
2016	Song Machine	John Seabrook		Audie Award for Nonfiction	Finalist	
2016	X: A Novel	Ilyasah Shabazz and Kekla Magoon	Ilyasah Shabazz	Audie Award for Young Adult Title	Finalist	
2017	28 Days: Moments in Black History that Changed the World (2015)	Charles R. Smith, Jr.	William Jackson Harper, Zainab Jah, January LaVoy, Robin Miles, Lizan Mitchell, Jonathan Earl Peck, and Carter Woodson Redwood	Audie Award for Young Listeners' Title	Won	
2017	Broca's Brain: Reflections on the Romance of Science (1974)	Carl Sagan		Earphones Award	Won	
2017	Dear Martin (2017)	Nic Stone		Earphones Award	Won	
2017	Evicted: Poverty and Profit in the American City	Matthew Desmond		Audie Award for Nonfiction	Finalist	
2017	My Greatest: My Own Story	Muhammad Ali with Richard Durham		Audie Award for Autobiography or Memoir	Won	
2017	Trombone Shorty (2015)	Troy "Trombone Shorty" Andrews		Earphones Award	Won	
2018	American Histories: Stories (2018)	John Edgar Wideman		Earphones Award	Won	
2018	Down the River Unto the Sea (2018)	Walter Mosley		Earphones Award	Won	
2018	Finding Langston (2018)	Lesa Cline-Ransome		Earphones Award	Won	
2018	Fresh Ink: An Anthology (2018)	Lamar Giles (editor)	Guy Lockard, Kim Mai Guest, Bahni Turpin, Ron Butler, et al.	Earphones Award	Won	
2018	The Monk of Mokha (2018)	Dave Eggers		Earphones Award	Won	
2018	Trombone Shorty (2015)	Troy "Trombone Shorty" Andrews		Audie Award for Young Listeners' Title	Finalist	
2018	Trombone Shorty (2015)	Troy "Trombone Shorty" Andrews		Odyssey Award	Honor	
2018	Washington Black (2018)	Esi Edugyan		Earphones Award	Won	
2019	Birthday Suit (2019)	Lauren Blakely	Andi Arndt, Sebastian York, January LaVoy, Julia Whelan, R.C. Bray, Shane East, Joe Arden, Erin Mallon, Savannah Peachwood, Jason Clarke, and Robin Miles	Earphones Award	Won	
2019	Black Leopard, Red Wolf (2019)	Marlon James		Earphones Award	Won	
2019	But Beautiful: A Book About Jazz (1996)	Geoff Dyer		Earphones Award	Won	
2019	Coming Through Slaughter (1976)	Michael Ondaatje		Earphones Award	Won	
2019	Finding Langston (2018)	Lesa Cline-Ransome		Audie Award for Middle Grade Title	Finalist	
2019	Her Right Foot	Dave Eggars		Audie Award for Young Listeners' Title	Finalist	
2019	Jump Back, Paul (2015)	Sally Derby	Bahni Turpin	Audie Award for Middle Grade Title	Finalist	
2019	The Starless Sea (2019)	Erin Morgenstern	Dominic Hoffman, Bahni Turpin, Fiona Hardingham, Allan Corduner, and Jorjeana Marie	Earphones Award	Won	

==== Best of the Year lists ====
Year	Title	Author(s)	Other narrator(s)	List	Ref.
2010	A Heartbreaking Work of Staggering Genius (2000)	Dave Eggers		AudioFile Best Biography & Memoir	
2010	Peace, Locomotion	Jacqueline Woodson		Notable Children's Recordings	
2010	They Called Themselves the K.K.K.	Susan Campbell Bartoletti		AudioFile Best Young Adult	
2011	Black Jack: The Ballad of Jack Johnson (2010)	Charles R. Smith, Jr.		AudioFile Best Children & Family Listening	
2011	Looking Like Me	Walter Dean Myers	Quincy Tyler Bernstine	AudioFile Best Children & Family Listening	
2011	The Rock and the River (2010)	Kekla Magoon		AudioFile Best Young Adult	
2012	Miles: The Autobiography (1989)	Miles Davis and Quincy Troupe		AudioFile Best Biography & Memoir	
2012	Locomotion	Jacqueline Woodson		AudioFile Best Children	
2012	Looking Like Me	Walter Dean Myers	Quincy Tyler Bernstine	Notable Children's Recordings	
2013	The Circle			AudioFile Best Fiction	
2013	Goodnight, Goodnight, Construction Site	Weston Woods		Notable Children's Recordings	
2014	Behind Enemy Lines			AudioFile Best Children	
2014	H.O.R.S.E.: A Game of Basketball and Imagination (2012)	Christopher Myers		AudioFile Best Children	
2015	In the Heat of the Night			AudioFile Best Mystery & Suspense	
2015	The Cool Cottontail			AudioFile Best Mystery & Suspense	
2015	X: A Novel	Ilyasah Shabazz and Kekla Magoon	Ilyasah Shabazz	AudioFile Best Young Adult	
2016	My Name is Not Friday (2016)	Jon Walter		AudioFile Best Young Adult	
2016	My Greatest: My Own Story	Muhammad Ali with Richard Durham		AudioFile Best Memoir	
2017	Trombone Shorty (2015)	Troy "Trombone Shorty" Andrews		AudioFile Best Children & Family Listening	
2017	Flying Lessons and Other Stories			AudioFile Best Children & Family Listening	
2017	28 Days: Moments in Black History that Changed the World (2015)	Charles R. Smith, Jr.	William Jackson Harper, Zainab Jah, January LaVoy, Robin Miles, Lizan Mitchell, Jonathan Earl Peck, and Carter Woodson Redwood	AudioFile Best Children & Family Listening	
2018	Finding Langston (2018)	Lesa Cline-Ransome		AudioFile Best Children & Family Listening	
2018	Washington Black	Esi Edugyan		AudioFile Best Fiction	
2019	Black Leopard, Red Wolf (2019)	Marlon James		AudioFile Best Sci-Fi, Fantasy & Horror	

=== 2020s ===
==== Awards ====
Year	Title	Author(s)	Other narrator(s)	Award	Result	Ref.
2020	American Savior: A Novel of Divine Politics (2008)	Roland Merullo		Earphones Award	Won	
2020	Birthday Suit (2019)	Lauren Blakely	Andi Arndt, Sebastian York, January LaVoy, Julia Whelan, R.C. Bray, Shane East, Joe Arden, Erin Mallon, Savannah Peachwood, Jason Clarke, and Robin Miles	Audie Award for Audio Drama	Finalist	
2020	Black Leopard, Red Wolf (2019)	Marlon James		Audie Award for Fantasy	Finalist	
2020	Blood in the Water	Jack Flynn		Audie Award for Thriller or Suspense	Finalist	
2020	Box: Henry Brown Mails Himself to Freedom (2020)	Carole Boston Weatherford		Earphones Award	Won	
2020	Clean Getaway (2020)	Nic Stone		Earphones Award	Won	
2020	Dear Justyce (2020)	Nic Stone		Earphones Award	Won	
2020	Leaving Lymon (2020)	Lesa Cline-Ransome		Earphones Award	Won	
2020	Little Family (2020)	Ishmael Beah		Earphones Award	Won	
2020	Lovely War (2019)	Julie Berry	Jayne Entwistle, Allan Corduner, Julie Berry, Fiona Hardingham, John Lee, Nathaniel Parker, and Steve West	Audie Award for Young Adult Title	Finalist	
2020	Overground Railroad (2020)	Lesa Cline-Ransome	Shayna Small and Lesa Cline-Ransome (author's note)	Earphones Award	Won	
2020	Trouble is What I Do (2020)	Walter Mosley		Earphones Award	Won	
2020	When Stars Are Scattered (2020)	Victoria Jamieson and Omar Mohamed	Faysal Ahmed, Barkhad Abdi, Robin Miles, Ifrah Mansour, Bahni Turpin, Hakeemshady Mohamed, Sadeeq Ali, Dominic Hoffman, Christine Avila, and a full cast	Earphones Award	Won	
2021	Concrete Rose (2021)	Angie Thomas		Earphones Award	Won	
2021	The Dead Are Arising	Les Payne and Tamara Payne		Audie Award for History or Biography	Finalist	
2021	Four Hundred Souls: A Community History of African America, 1619–2019 (2021)	Ibram X. Kendi and Keisha N. Blain (editors)	J. D. Jackson, Kevin R. Free, January LaVoy, Robin Miles, Angela Y. Davis, Nikole Hannah-Jones, and a Full Cast	Earphones Award	Won	
2021	Harlem Shuffle (2021)	Colson Whitehead		Earphones Award	Won	
2021	Look for Me and I'll Be Gone: Stories (2021)	John Edgar Wideman	Janina Edwards	Earphones Award	Won	
2021	Milo Imagines the World (2021)	Matt de la Peña		Earphones Award	Won	
2021	The Overground Railroad (2020)	Lesa Cline-Ransome	Shayna Small	Audie Award for Young Listeners' Title	Won	
2021	Playing the Cards You're Dealt (2021)	Varian Johnson		Earphones Award	Won	
2021	Songdogs (1995)	Colum McCann		Earphones Award	Won	
2021	The Sundial (1958)	Shirley Jackson with Victor LaValle (foreword)	Kirsten Potter	Earphones Award	Won	
2021	This Side of Brightness (2013)	Colum McCann		Earphones Award	Won	
2021	Trouble Is What I Do (2020)	Walter Mosley		Audie Award for Mystery	Finalist	
2022	Animals (2021)	Will Staples		Earphones Award	Won	
2022	Blackout	Dhonielle Clayton, Tiffany D. Jackson, Nic Stone, Angie Thomas, Ashley Woodfolk, and Nicola Yoon	Joniece Abbott-Pratt, Imani Parks, Jordan Cobb, Shayna Small, A.J. Beckles, and Bahni Turpin	Audie Award for Short Stories or Collections	Won	
2022	The Bucket List	Peter Mohlin and Peter Nystrom		Audie Award for Mystery	Finalist	
2022	The Chimpanzee Whisperer: A Life of Love and Loss, Compassion and Conservation (2022)	Stany Nyandwi and David Blissett with Dr. Jane Goodall (foreword)	Callie Beaulieu (foreword)	Earphones Award	Won	
2022	Concrete Rose (2021)	Angie Thomas		Amazing Audiobooks for Young Adults	Top 10	
2022	Dirty Bird Blues (1996)	Clarence Major with Yusef Komunyakaa (foreword) and John Beckman (introduction)		Earphones Award	Won	
2022	Four Hundred Souls: A Community History of African America, 1619–2019 (2021)	Ibram X. Kendi and Keisha N. Blain (editors)	J. D. Jackson, Kevin R. Free, January LaVoy, Robin Miles, Angela Y. Davis, Nikole Hannah-Jones, and a Full Cast	Audie Award for Multi-Voiced Performance	Finalist	
2022	His Name is George Floyd: One Man's Life and the Struggle for Racial Justice (2022)	Robert Samuels and Toluse Olorunnipa	Robert Samuels and Toluse Olorunnipa (introduction)	Earphones Award	Won	
2022	The Lincoln Highway	Amor Towles	Edoardo Ballerini and Marin Ireland	Audie Award for Fiction	Finalist	
2022	A Lynching at Port Jervis: Race and Reckoning in the Gilded Age (2022)	Philip Dray		Earphones Award	Won	
2022	Playing the Cards You're Dealt	Varian Johnson		Audie Award for Middle Grade Title	Won	
2022	The Scent of Burnt Flowers (2022)	Blitz Bazawule		Earphones Award	Won	
2022	The Weary Blues (1926)	Langston Hughes		Earphones Award	Won	
2024	Coleman Hill	Kim Coleman Foote	Bahni Turpin	Audie Award for Multi-Voiced Performance	Finalist	
2024	King: A Life	Jonathan Eig		Audie Award for History or Biography	Finalist	
2024	King: A Life	Jonathan Eig		Audie Award for Nonfiction Narrator	Won	
2024	The Lost Sons of Omaha	Joe Sexton		Audie Award for Nonfiction Narrator	Finalist	
2024	Poverty, by America (2023)	Matthew Desmond		Audie Award for Nonfiction	Won	
2024	Tread of Angels (2022)	Rebecca Roanhorse		Audie Award for Fantasy	Finalist	
2024	The Wager: A Tale of Shipwreck, Mutiny and Murder (2023)	David Grann		Audie Award for History or Biography	Finalist	
2024	The Wager: A Tale of Shipwreck, Mutiny and Murder (2023)	David Grann		Audie Award for Nonfiction Narrator	Finalist	

==== Best of the Year lists ====
Year	Title	Author(s)	Other narrator(s)	List	Ref.
2020	Charlotte's Web (1952)	E. B. White		Audie Award for Middle Grade Title	
2020	Overground Railroad (2020)	Lesa Cline-Ransome	Shayna Small and Lesa Cline-Ransome (author's note)	AudioFile Best Children's Books	
2020	When Stars Are Scattered (2020)	Victoria Jamieson and Omar Mohamed	Faysal Ahmed, Barkhad Abdi, Robin Miles, Ifrah Mansour, Bahni Turpin, Hakeemshady Mohamed, Sadeeq Ali, Dominic Hoffman, Christine Avila, and a full cast	AudioFile Best Children's Books	
2021	Concrete Rose (2021)	Angie Thomas		AudioFile Best Young Adult of 2021	
2021	Four Hundred Souls: A Community History of African America, 1619–2019 (2021)	Ibram X. Kendi and Keisha N. Blain (editors)	J. D. Jackson, Kevin R. Free, January LaVoy, Robin Miles, Angela Y. Davis, Nikole Hannah-Jones, and a Full Cast	AudioFile Best History & Biography	
2021	Harlem Shuffle (2021)	Colson Whitehead		AudioFile Best Fiction	

== Selected narration ==
=== 2000s ===
Year	Title	Author(s)	Other narrator(s)
2002	Bombingham (2001)	Anthony Grooms	
2002	West of Rehoboth (2001)	Alexs D. Pate	
2005	I Got Somebody in Staunton (2005)	William Henry Lewis	Kevin R. Free, Lizan Mitchell, and Ezra Knight
2006	Dancing in the Dark (2005)	Caryl Phillips	
2006	River Rising (2005)	Athol Dickson	
2007	Death by Black Hole: And Other Cosmic Quandaries (2007)	Neil DeGrasse Tyson	
2008	Chasing the Devil's Tail: A Mystery of Storyville, New Orleans	David Fulmer	
2008	Pepperfish Keys (2007)	Darryl Wimberley	
2009	Peace, Locomotion	Jacqueline Woodson	
2009	Time Traveler: A Scientist's Personal Mission to Make Time Travel a Reality (2007)	Ronald L. Mallett and Bruce Henderson	
2009	The Way Home (2009)	George Pelecanos	
2009	We Are the Ship	Kadir Nelson	

=== 2010s ===
Year	Title	Author	Other Narrator(s)
2010	A Heartbreaking Work of Staggering Genius (2000)	Dave Eggers	
2010	The Rock and the River (2010)	Kekla Magoon	
2010	You Shall Know Our Velocity! (2003)	Dave Eggers	
2011	Black Jack: The Ballad of Jack Johnson (2010)	Charles R. Smith, Jr.	
2011	Going to Meet the Man (1957)	James Baldwin	
2011	Looking Like Me	Walter Dean Myers	Quincy Tyler Bernstine
2012	Astray	Emma Donoghue	Khristine Hvam, James Langton, Robert Petkoff, and Suzanne Toren
2012	Locomotion	Jacqueline Woodson	
2012	Miles: The Autobiography (1989)	Miles Davis and Quincy Troupe	
2012	Pick-Up Game	Marc Aronson and Charles R. Smith Jr., et al.	Quincy Tyler
2012	Swordspoint: A Melodrama of Manners	Ellen Kushner	Ellen Kushner , Katherine Kellgren, Robert Fass, Nick Sullivan, Simon Jones, Sam Guncler, and Anne Bobby
2012	We Are America	Walter Dean Myers	MacLeod Andrews, Olivia DuFord, Lizan Mitchell, Christopher Myers, Walter Dean Myers, Johanna Parker, Adriana Sananes, and Kaipo Schwab
2014	H.O.R.S.E.: A Game of Basketball and Imagination (2012)	Christopher Myers	
2014	The Swords of Riverside	Ellen Kushnerand Delia Sherman	Ellen Kushner , Barbara Rosenblat, Katherine Kellgren, Simon Jones
2015	28 Days: Moments in Black History that Changed the World (2015)	Charles R. Smith, Jr.	William Jackson Harper, Zainab Jah, January LaVoy, Robin Miles, Lizan Mitchell, Jonathan Earl Peck, and Carter Woodson Redwood
2015	Book: My Autobiography (2014)	John Agard	
2015	Five Pieces of Jade (1972)	John Ball	
2015	Midnight in the Garden of Good and Evil (1994)	John Berendt	Dylan Baker, Laverne Cox, Barbara Rosenblat, and a full cast
2015	X: A Novel	Ilyasah Shabazz and Kekla Magoon	Ilyasah Shabazz
2016	Evicted: Poverty and Profit in the American City	Matthew Desmond	
2016	My Greatest: My Own Story	Muhammad Ali with Richard Durham	
2017	Broca's Brain: Reflections on the Romance of Science (1974)	Carl Sagan	
2017	Dear Martin (2017)	Nic Stone	
2017	Trombone Shorty (2015)	Troy "Trombone Shorty" Andrews	
2018	American Histories: Stories (2018)	John Edgar Wideman	
2018	Down the River Unto the Sea (2018)	Walter Mosley	
2018	Finding Langston (2018)	Lesa Cline-Ransome	
2018	Fresh Ink: An Anthology (2018)	Lamar Giles (editor)	Guy Lockard, Kim Mai Guest, Bahni Turpin, Ron Butler, et al.
2018	The Monk of Mokha (2018)	Dave Eggers	
2018	Washington Black (2018)	Esi Edugyan	
2019	Birthday Suit (2019)	Lauren Blakely	Andi Arndt, Sebastian York, January LaVoy, Julia Whelan, R.C. Bray, Shane East, Joe Arden, Erin Mallon, Savannah Peachwood, Jason Clarke, and Robin Miles
2019	Black Leopard, Red Wolf (2019)	Marlon James	
2019	Blood in the Water (2019)	Jack Flynn	
2019	Lovely War (2019)	Julie Berry	Jayne Entwistle, Allan Corduner, Julie Berry, Fiona Hardingham, John Lee, Nathaniel Parker, and Steve West

=== 2020s ===
Year	Title	Author(s)	Other narrator(s)
2020	American Savior: A Novel of Divine Politics (2008)	Roland Merullo	
2020	Box: Henry Brown Mails Himself to Freedom (2020)	Carole Boston Weatherford	
2020	Clean Getaway (2020)	Nic Stone	
2020	The Dead Are Arising	Les Payne and Tamara Payne	
2020	Dear Justyce (2020)	Nic Stone	
2020	Leaving Lymon (2020)	Lesa Cline-Ransome	
2020	Little Family (2020)	Ishmael Beah	
2020	Overground Railroad (2020)	Lesa Cline-Ransome	Shayna Small and Lesa Cline-Ransome (author's note)
2020	Trouble is What I Do (2020)	Walter Mosley	
2020	When Stars Are Scattered (2020)	Victoria Jamieson and Omar Mohamed	Faysal Ahmed, Barkhad Abdi, Robin Miles, Ifrah Mansour, Bahni Turpin, Hakeemshady Mohamed, Sadeeq Ali, Dominic Hoffman, Christine Avila, and a full cast
2021	Concrete Rose (2021)	Angie Thomas	
2021	Four Hundred Souls: A Community History of African America, 1619–2019 (2021)	Ibram X. Kendi and Keisha N. Blain (editors)	J. D. Jackson, Kevin R. Free, January LaVoy, Robin Miles, Angela Y. Davis, Nikole Hannah-Jones, and a Full Cast
2021	Harlem Shuffle (2021)	Colson Whitehead	
2021	The Lincoln Highway	Amor Towles	Edoardo Ballerini and Marin Ireland
2021	Look for Me and I'll Be Gone: Stories (2021)	John Edgar Wideman	Janina Edwards
2021	Milo Imagines the World (2021)	Matt de la Peña	
2021	Playing the Cards You're Dealt (2021)	Varian Johnson	
2021	Songdogs (1995)	Colum McCann	
2021	The Sundial (1958)	Shirley Jackson with Victor LaValle (foreword)	Kirsten Potter
2021	This Side of Brightness (2013)	Colum McCann	
2021	Trouble Is What I Do (2020)	Walter Mosley	
2022	Animals (2021)	Will Staples	
2022	Blackout	Dhonielle Clayton, Tiffany D. Jackson, Nic Stone, Angie Thomas, Ashley Woodfolk, and Nicola Yoon	Joniece Abbott-Pratt, Imani Parks, Jordan Cobb, Shayna Small, A.J. Beckles, and Bahni Turpin
2022	The Bucket List	Peter Mohlin and Peter Nystrom	
2022	The Chimpanzee Whisperer: A Life of Love and Loss, Compassion and Conservation (2022)	Stany Nyandwi and David Blissett with Dr. Jane Goodall (foreword)	Callie Beaulieu (foreword)
2022	Dirty Bird Blues (1996)	Clarence Major with Yusef Komunyakaa (foreword) and John Beckman (introduction)	
2022	His Name Is George Floyd: One Man's Life and the Struggle for Racial Justice (2022)	Robert Samuels and Toluse Olorunnipa	Robert Samuels and Toluse Olorunnipa (introduction)
2022	A Lynching at Port Jervis: Race and Reckoning in the Gilded Age (2022)	Philip Dray	
2022	The Scent of Burnt Flowers (2022)	Blitz Bazawule	
2022	The Weary Blues (1926)	Langston Hughes	
2023	The Wager: A Tale of Shipwreck, Mutiny and Murder (2023)	David Grann	

== Filmography ==
Year	Title	Role	Notes
1992	Malcolm X	Elijah Muhammad's FOI	
1994	Biography	Narrator / Self	1 episode: Mike Tyson: Fallen Champ
1995	New York News	Subway cop	1 episode: Thin Line
1997	Homicide: Life on the Street	Curtis Lambright	1 episode: Saigon Rose
1998	Law & Order	Smith	1 episode: Punk
1999	Crucible of Empire: The Spanish American War	Voiceover	
2000	American Experience	Narrator	1 episode: Jubilee Singers: Sacrifice and Glory
2000	Culture Shock	Narrator / Self	1 episode: The Devil's Music: 1920s Jazz
2000	Third Watch	Crews	1 episode: Young Men and Fire
2001	Thirteen Conversations About One Thing	Defense Attorney	
2002	Law & Order: Special Victims Unit	Samuel Hill	1 episode: Waste
2003	Hack	Slavitt	1 episode: Signature
2003	The Investigators	Narrator	1 episode: Railroaded in Texas
2003	Law & Order	Ron Hamilton	1 episode: Floater
2003	NYPD Blue	Troy Miner	1 episode: Shear Stupidity
2004	American Experience	Narrator	2 episodes
2004	Law & Order: Criminal Intent	Detective Waites	1 episode: Consumed
2004	Gallery Tours	Narrator	4 episodes
2005	Crime Life: Gang Wars	Voice	
2007	Art of the Heist	Narrator	
2007	I Love New York	Self	13 episodes
2007	Law & Order	Principal Ron Hill	1 episode: Good Faith
2006–2008	Flavor of Love	Narrator / Self	27 episodes
2006–2008	The Wire	State's Attorney Rupert Bond	8 episodes
2008	Gossip Girl	FBI Agent	1 episode: The Magnificent Archibalds
2010	Law & Order: Special Victims Unit	FBI Agent Dowley	1 episode: Penetration
2010	Solved	Narrator / Self	6 episodes
2011	The Good Wife	Joey Church	1 episode: Silly Season
2011	Star Wars: The Old Republic	Felix Iresso / Marcus Trant / Officer Mal	
2013	The Secret Life of Walter Mitty	TSA Officer #2	
2013	Star Wars: The Old Republic: Rise of the Hutt Cartel	Felix Iresso / Regulator Guard	
2009–2014	After the First 48	Narrator	7 episodes
2014	Star Wars: The Old Republic - Shadow of Revan	Felix Iresso	
2014–2015	Madam Secretary	Diplomatic Security Head Agent Fred Cole	5 episodes
2015	The Iron Warehouse	Larry Johnson	
2015	Star Wars: The Old Republic - Knights of the Fallen Empire	Felix Iresso	
2016	Mercy	Dr. Turner	
2016	The Walking Dead: Michonne	Dominic	
2018	Elementary	Hakeem	1 episode: The Adventure of the Ersatz Sobekneferu
2018	World of Warcraft: Battle for Azeroth	Voice	
2019	The Atlanta Child Murders	Narrator	3 episodes
2019	FBI	ASAC Tom Andrews	1 episode: Appearances
2019	Star Wars: The Old Republic - Onslaught	Additional Voices	
2020	Box: Henry Brown Mails Himself to Freedom		
2021	The Blacklist	Gib Horn	1 episode: 16 Ounces
2021	The Daily	Self	1 episode: From the Sunday Read Archive: My Mustache, My Self
2004–2022	The First 48	Narrator / Self	486 episodes
