= Walter Dean Myers Award =

Annual literary award

The Walter Dean Myers Award for Outstanding Children's Literature, known as "The Walters," was created by the American nonprofit We Need Diverse Books (WNDB) in 2014, and the inaugural award was presented in 2016. Named after young adult author Walter Dean Myers, the award recognizes published, diverse authors who champion marginalized voices in their stories. The awards program is managed by WNDB's co-directors Kathie Weinberg and Terry Hong. In 2018, WNDB changed the categories from a single category of young adult titles to two categories of teen and young readers. Subsequent awards include both categories.

== Recipients ==
Award winners and finalists
Year	Category	Recipient	Title	Result	Ref.
2016	N/A	Jason Reynolds and Brendan Kiely	All American Boys	Winner	
2016	N/A	Margarita Engle and Edel Rodriguez (illus.)	Enchanted Air: Two Cultures, Two Wings: A Memoir	Honor	
2016	N/A	Ilyasah Shabazz and Kekla Magoon	X	Honor	
2017	N/A	John Lewis, Andrew Aydin, and Nathan Powell	March: Book Three	Winner	
2017	N/A	Marina Budhos	Watched	Honor	
2017	N/A	Meredith Russo	If I Was Your Girl	Honor	
2017	N/A	Nicola Yoon	The Sun Is Also a Star	Honor	
2018	Teen	Jason Reynolds	Long Way Down	Winner	
2018	Teen	Mitlali Perkins	You Bring the Distant Near	Honor	
2018	Teen	Francisco X. Stork	Disappeared	Honor	
2018	Younger Reader	Carole Boston Weatherford and Eric Velasquez (illus.)	Schomburg: The Man Who Built a Library	Winner	
2018	Younger Reader	Margarita Engle	Forest World	Honor	
2019	Teen	Elizabeth Acevedo	The Poet X	Winner	
2019	Teen	Tiffany Jackson	Monday's Not Coming	Honor	
2019	Teen	Emily X.R. Pan	The Astonishing Color of After	Honor	
2019	Younger Reader	Jewell Parker Rhodes	Ghosts Boys	Winner	
2019	Younger Reader	David Bowles	They Call Me Güero	Honor	
2019	Younger Reader	Veera Hiranandani	The Night Diary	Honor	
2020	Teen	Mariko Tamaki and Rosemary Valero-O'Connell (illus.)	Laura Dean Keeps Breaking Up With Me	Winner	
2020	Teen	Akwaeke Emezi	Pet	Honor	
2020	Teen	Elizabeth Acevedo	With the Fire on High	Honor	
2020	Younger Reader	Padma Venkatraman	The Bridge Home	Winner	
2020	Younger Reader	Lisa Moore Ramée	A Good Kind of Trouble	Honor	
2020	Younger Reader	Jasmine Warga	Other Words for Home	Honor	
2021	Teen	Ibi Zoboi and Yusef Salaam and Omar T. Pasha (illus.)	Punching the Air	Winner	
2021	Teen	Traci Chee	We Are Not Free	Honor	
2021	Teen	Robin Ha	Almost American Girl	Honor	
2021	Younger Reader	Victoria Jamieson, Omar Mohamed, and Iman Geddy	When Stars Are Scattered	Winner	
2021	Younger Reader	Kacen Callender	King and the Dragonflies	Honor	
2021	Younger Reader	Daniel Nayeri	Everything Sad Is Untrue	Honor	
2022	Teen	Angeline Boulley	Firekeeper's Daughter	Winner	
2022	Teen	Malinda Lo	Last Night at the Telegraph Club	Honor	
2022	Teen	Kekla Magoon	Revolution in Our Time	Honor	
2022	Younger Reader	Rajani LaRocca	Red, White, and Whole	Winner	
2022	Younger Reader	Thomas King and Natasha Donovan (illus.)	Borders	Honor	
2022	Younger Reader	Eden Royce	Root Magic	Honor	
2023	Teen	Andrea L. Rogers and Jeff Edwards	Man Made Monsters	Winner	
2023	Teen	Sonora Reyes	The Lesbiana's Guide to Catholic School	Honor	
2023	Teen	Sabaa Tahir	All My Rage	Honor	
2023	Young Reader	Angela Joy and Janelle Washington	Choosing Brave: How Mamie Till-Mobley and Emmett Till Sparked the Civil Rights Movement	Winner	
2023	Young Reader	Christina Soontornvat	The Last Mapmaker	Honor	
2023	Young Reader	Ibi Zoboi	Star Child: A Biographical Constellation of Octavia Estelle Butler	Honor	
2024	Teen	Ari Tison	Saints of the Household	Winner	
2024	Teen	Hannah V. Sawyerr	All the Fighting Parts	Honor	
2024	Young Reader	Jacqueline Woodson	Remember Us	Winner	
2024	Young Reader	Aisha Saeed, Huda Al-Marashi, Jamilah Thompkins-Bigelow, and S. K. Ali	Grounded	Honor	
2025	Teen	Renée Watson, Ekua Holmes	Black Girl You Are Atlas	Winner	
2025	Teen	June Hur	A Crane Among Wolves	Honor	
2025	Young Reader	Sherri Winston	Shark Teeth	Winner	
2025	Young Reader	Eden Royce	The Creepening of Dogwood	Honor	
2025	Teen	Kareem Abdul-Jabbar, Raymond Obstfeld and Ed Laroche	Champion	Winner	
2025	Teen	Renée Watson	All the Blues in the Sky	Honor	
2025	Young Reader	Derrick Barnes	The Incredibly Human Henson Blayze	Winner	
2025	Young Reader	Idris Goodwi	King of the Neuro Verse	Honor	
