= Dominic Hoffman =

American actor

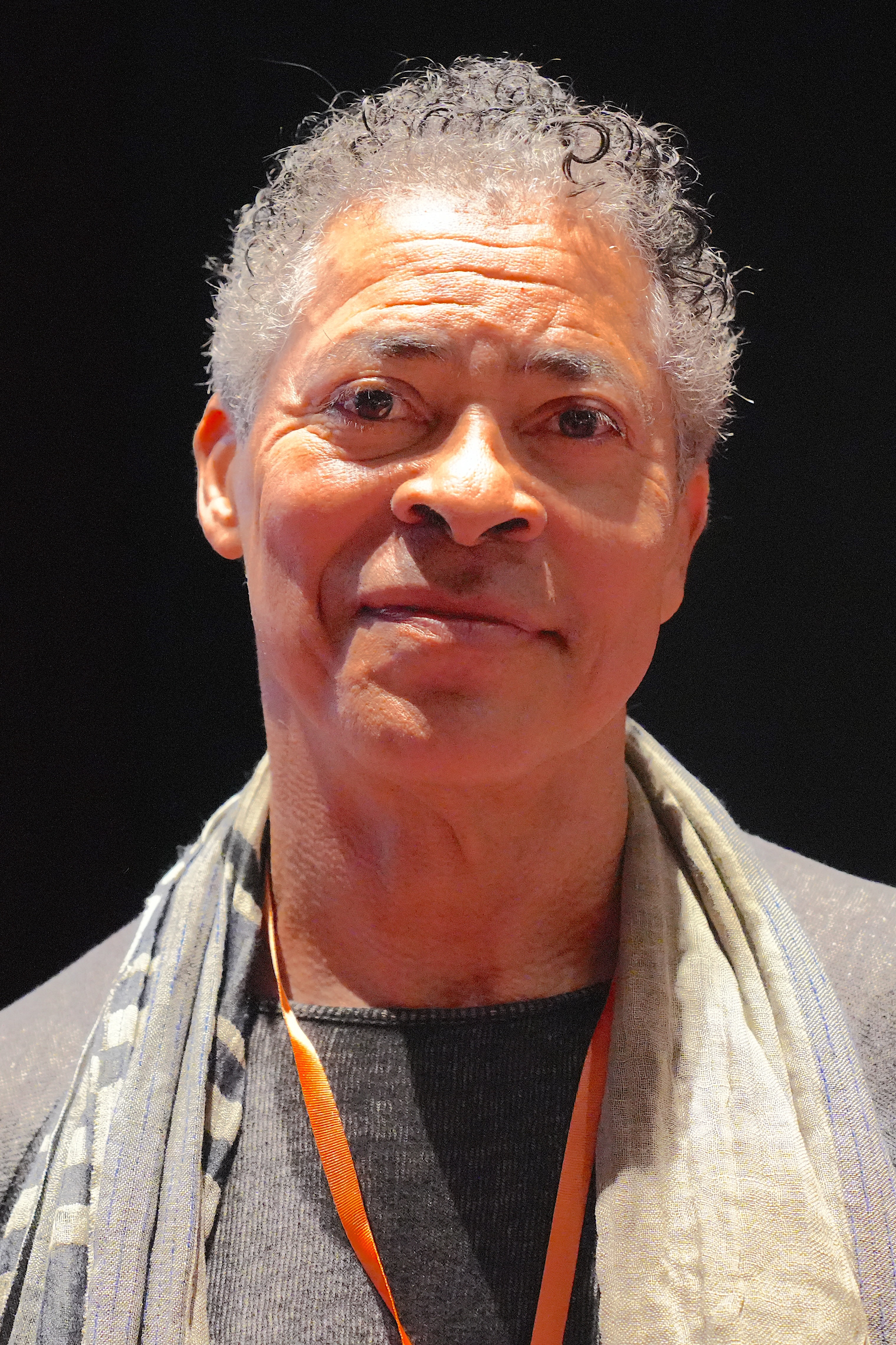
- Hoffman at LA Times Festival of Books, 2025.
- Born: October 30, 1962 (age 64)
- Occupation: Actor
- Years active: 1985–present

Dominic Hoffman (born October 30, 1962) is an American actor and playwright. He is known for his recurring roles on The Shield as Louis Sperling, A Different World as Whitley's boyfriend, Julian Day, and Grey's Anatomy as Dr. Jeff Russell.

He is also an accomplished theater actor and playwright, earning Ovation awards in 2000 for his one-man show "Uncle Jacques' Symphony."

Hoffman is also a distinguished audiobook narrator, winning the 2017 Audie Award for Literary Fiction or Classics for his rendition of Yaa Gyasi's Homegoing. He has also been a finalist for two other Audie Awards and an Odyssey Award.

== Personal life and education ==
Hoffman received a Bachelor of Arts in English Literature from the University of California, Santa Cruz. He also received training from the American Conservatory Theater, London Academy of Music and Dramatic Arts, and New York University Tisch School of the Arts.

Hoffman presently lives in Venice, California and spends time in Paris annually.

== Awards and honors ==
=== Awards ===
Year	Title	Media	List	Result	Ref.
1996	Blade to the Heat	Theatre	DramaLogue Award for Outstanding Performance	Winner	
2017	Homegoing (2016) by Yaa Gyasi	Audiobook	Audie Award for Literary Fiction or Classics	Winner	
2018	The Sun is Also a Star (2016) by Nicola Yoon	Audiobook	Amazing Audiobooks for Young Adults	Top 10	
2021	Deacon King Kong (2020) by James McBride	Audiobook	Audie Award for Literary Fiction or Classics	Finalist	
2021	When Stars are Scattered (2020) by Victoria Jamieson and Omar Mohamed	Audiobook	Amazing Audiobooks for Young Adults	Top 10	
2021	When Stars are Scattered (2020) by Victoria Jamieson and Omar Mohamed	Audiobook	Odyssey Award	Honor	
2022	Four Hundred Souls, edited by Ibram X. Kendi and Keisha N. Blain	Audiobook	Audie Award for Multi-Voiced Performance	Finalist	
	Last Fare	Theatre	NAACP Image Award for Best Play	Winner	
	Last Fare	Theatre	NAACP Image Award for Best Actor	Winner	

=== "Best of" lists ===
Year	Title	List	Ref.
2006	An Ordinary Man by Paul Rusesabagina	Booklist Editors' Choice: Media	
2012	Last Days of Ptolemy Grey by Walter Mosley	RUSA Listen List	
2015	The Port Chicago 50: Disaster, Mutiny, and the Fight for Civil Rights by Steve Sheinkin	Amazing Audiobooks for Young Adults	
2020	Deacon King Kong (2020) by James McBride	AudioFile Best of Fiction	
2020	When Stars are Scattered (2020) by Victoria Jamieson and Omar Mohamed	AudioFile Best of Children's Titles	
2020	When Stars are Scattered (2020) by Victoria Jamieson and Omar Mohamed	Booklist Editors' Choice: Youth Audio, 2020	
2021	145th Street: Short Stories by Walter Dean Meyers	Amazing Audiobooks for Young Adults	
2021	When Stars are Scattered (2020) by Victoria Jamieson and Omar Mohamed	Notable Children's Recordings	

== Filmography ==
=== Film ===
Year	Film	Role
1987	Jaws: The Revenge	Additional Voices
1988	School Daze	Mustafa
1988	Casual Sex?	Additional Voices
1988	Survival Quest	Jeff
1992	Original Intent	Cox
1997	One Eight Seven	Victor
2001	Kingdom Come	Antoine Depew
2008	Redbelt	Detective
2013	Phil Spector	Mr. Brown
2022	Swamp Lion	Fred
2025	Henry Johnson	Jerry

=== Television ===
Year	Title	Role	Notes
1985	V	Visitor	Episode: The Conversion
1986	Comedy Factory	Bookstore Customer	Episodes: Man About Town
1985-1988	St. Elsewhere	Paramedic Tim Dillworth	Five episodes: Give the Boy a Hand, The Naked and the Dead, The Boom Boom Womb, Heart On and Final Cut
1988	Cheers	2nd Customer	Episode: Yacht of Fools
1989	CBS Schoolbreak Special	Donny Hall	Episode: My Past Is My Own
1989	Beauty and the Beast	Resident	Episode: A Kingdom by the Sea
1989–1991	A Different World	Kent Souje (1 episode); Julian Day (8 episodes)	Nine episodes: For She's Only a Bird in a Gilded Cage (as Kent Souje); A World Alike, That's the Trouble with You All, A Camp Fire Story, Getaway: Part I, Getaway: Part II, Perhaps Love, 21 Candles, Ex-Communication (as Julian Day)
1990	Family Matters	Steve Webster	Episode: Torn Between Two Lovers
1993	Living Single	Patrick	Episode: Living Single... with Children
1993	The Fresh Prince of Bel-Air	Dr. Kervarkian	Episode: Home Is Where The Heart Attack Is
1993–1994	Hangin' with Mr. Cooper	Dr. Pickney (1 episode) Thaddeus Jamison White (5 episodes)	Six episodes: Valentine's Day Massacre (as Dr. Pickney), Private School, It's My Party and I'll Die If I Want To, The Courtship of Mark Cooper, Truth or Consequences, Pros and Convicts (as Thaddeus Jamison White)
1995	Mad About You	Waiter	Episode: Two Tickets to Paradise
1995	NYPD Blue	Bar Owner	Episode: E.R.
1996	Buddies	Marcel	Episode: The PSA Story
1997	The Jamie Foxx Show	Kenneth	Episode: I am What I Scam
1997	Port Charles	Byron Rollins	Unknown episodes
1999	Between Brothers	Ramon	Episode: Fantasy Camp/Home Boyz of Summer
2004-2005	The Shield	Lou Sperling	Three episodes: Strays, All In, Grave
2006	The Unit	Neil Krinsman	Two episodes: Report by Exception, Bait
2008	Jericho	Colonel Fetts	Episode: Patriots and Tyrants
2009	24	Raymond Howell	Episode: Day 7: 12:00 p.m.-1:00 p.m.
2009	Lie to Me	SEC Deputy Ian Dawkins	Episode: Depraved Heart
2009	The Mentalist	Agent Hicks	Four episodes: The Scarlet Letter, Black Gold and Red Blood, Red Bulls, His Red Right Hand
2012–2013	Grey's Anatomy	Dr. Jeff Russell	Three episodes: Second Opinion, Bad Blood, Idle Hands
2019	S.W.A.T.	Ben Mosley	Episodes: Rocket Fuel

=== Audiobooks ===
Year	Title	Author	Notes
2018	The Collected Essays of Ralph Ellison	Ralph Ellison	
2019	Wanderers	Chuck Wendig	
2020	Exhalation	Ted Chiang	
2022	The Final Strife	Saara El-Arifi	
2023	White Cat, Black Dog	Kelly Link	
2023	Same Bed Different Dreams	Ed Park	
2023	The Heaven & Earth Grocery Store	James McBride	
2023	Life and Other Love Songs	Anissa Gray	
2024	James	Percival Everett	Audible Audiobook of the Year 2024
2024	The Memory Palace	Nate Dimeo	
2024	Black Star	Kwame Alexander	
2024	The Black Box	Henry Louis Gates Jr.	
2024	Redwood Court	DéLana R. A. Dameron	
2025	King Sorrow	Joe Hill	
2025	All Star Superman	Judge Morris	
