= Audie Award for Young Listeners' Title =

The Audie Award for Young Listeners' Title is one of the Audie Awards presented annually by the Audio Publishers Association (APA). It awards excellence in narration, production, and content for a children's audiobook intended for children up to the age of 8 released in a given year. From 2004 to 2015 it was given as the Audie Award for Children's Title for Ages Up to Eight. Before 2004 it was given as the Audie Award for Children's Title for Ages Zero to Seven. It has been awarded since 2001, when it was separated from the more expansive Audie Award for Children's Title.

== Winners and finalists ==
=== 2000s ===
Year	Audiobook	Author(s)	Narrator(s)	Publisher	Result	Ref.
2001 6th	Ouch! (1998)	Natalie Babbitt	Martin Jarvis	Live Oak Media	Winner	
2001 6th	Charlie Parker Played Be Bop (1997)	Chris Raschka	Richard Allen	Live Oak Media	Finalist	
2001 6th	The Polar Express (1985)	Chris Van Allsburg	Liam Neeson	Houghton Mifflin	Finalist	
2002 7th	Ballet Stories (2001)	David Angus	Jenny Agutter	Naxos Audiobooks	Winner	
2002 7th	The Girl Who Loved Wild Horses (1978)	Paul Goble	Lance White Magpie	Live Oak Media	Finalist	
2002 7th	Joseph Had a Little Overcoat (2000)	Simms Taback	Simms Taback	Live Oak Media	Finalist	
2003 8th	The Blues of Flats Brown (2000)	Walter Dean Myers	Charles Turner	Live Oak Media	Winner	
2003 8th	In Daddy's Arms I Am Tall (2004)	Folami Abiade and Dinah Johnson	Javaka Steptoe, Robin Miles, Charles Turner, and Lizan Mitchell	Live Oak Media	Finalist	
2003 8th	John Coltrane's Giant Steps (1960)	Chris Raschka	Richard Allen	Live Oak Media	Finalist	
2003 8th	Saving Sweetness (1996)	Diane Stanley	Tom Bodett	Live Oak Media	Finalist	
2003 8th	Sheila Rae, the Brave (1987)	Kevin Henkes	Laura Hamilton	Live Oak Media	Finalist	
2004 9th	Chato and the Party Animals (2000)	Gary Soto	Luis Guzmán	Weston Woods	Winner	
2004 9th	Ella Fitzgerald: The Tale of a Vocal Virtuosa (2002)	Andrea Davis Pinkney and Brian Pinkney	Billy Dee Williams	Weston Woods	Finalist	
2004 9th	Green Eggs and Ham (1960)	Dr. Seuss	Jason Alexander, David Hyde Pierce, and Michael McKean	Random House Audio	Finalist	
2004 9th	Raising Sweetness (1999)	Diane Stanley	Tom Bodett	Live Oak Media	Finalist	
2004 9th	The Tale of Despereaux (2003)	Kate DiCamillo	Graeme Malcolm	Random House Audio	Finalist	
2005 10th	What Charlie Heard (2002)	Mordicai Gerstein	Mordicai Gerstein	Live Oak Media	Winner	
2005 10th	Lost Treasure of the Emerald Eye, The Curse of the Cheese Pyramid, (2004)	Geronimo Stilton	Edward Herrmann	Listening Library	Finalist	
2005 10th	Cat and Mouse in a Haunted House (2004)	Geronimo Stilton	Edward Herrmann	Listening Library	Finalist	
2005 10th	I Stink! (2002)	Kate and Jim McMullan	Andy Richter	Weston Woods	Finalist	
2005 10th	The Neil Gaiman Audio Collection (2004)	Neil Gaiman	Neil Gaiman	HarperAudio	Finalist	
2005 10th	When Marian Sang (2002)	Pam Muñoz Ryan	Gail Nelson	Live Oak Media	Finalist	
2006 11th	Arnie the Doughnut (2003)	Laurie Keller	Michael McKean, Diana Canova, David de Vries, et al.	Weston Woods	Winner	
2006 11th	A Bear Called Paddington (1958)	Michael Bond	Stephen Fry	HarperAudio	Finalist	
2006 11th	The Big Blueberry Barf-Off! (2005)	R. L. Stine	Michael McKean	HarperAudio	Finalist	
2006 11th	Blues Journey (2003)	Walter Dean Myers	Walter Dean Myers and Christopher Myers	Live Oak Media	Finalist	
2006 11th	Ellen Tebbits (1951)	Beverly Cleary	Amanda Martin	HarperAudio	Finalist	
2006 11th	The Great Smelling Bee (2005)	R. L. Stine	Michael McKean	HarperAudio	Finalist	
2007 12th	Knuffle Bunny (2005)	Mo Willems	Mo Willems, Cher, and Trixie Willems	Weston Woods	Winner	
2007 12th	Dog Den Mystery (2005)	Darrel and Sally Odgers	Alan King	Bolinda Audio	Finalist	
2007 12th	Murmel Murmel Munsch! (1982)	Robert Munsch	Robert Munsch	The Children's Group	Finalist	
2007 12th	Piccolo and Annabelle: Very Messy Inspection (2004)	Stephen Axelson	Stanley McGeagh	Bolinda Audio	Finalist	
2007 12th	Poetry Speaks to Children (2005)	Elise Paschen	Rita Dove, Ogden Nash, et al.	Sourcebooks	Finalist	
2008 13th	More About Paddington (1959)	Michael Bond	Stephen Fry	Harper Children's Audio	Winner	
2008 13th	In Aunt Giraffe's Green Garden (2007)	Jack Prelutsky	Jack Prelutsky	HarperAudio	Finalist	
2008 13th	Goodnight Hawaiian Moon (2006)	Terry Carolan	Amy Hānaialiʻi Gilliom	Banana Patch	Finalist	
2008 13th	Ogre in a Toga (2008)	Geoffrey McSkimming	Geoffrey McSkimming	Bolinda Audio	Finalist	
2008 13th	The One and Only Shrek! (1990)	William Steig	Meryl Streep and Stanley Tucci	Macmillan Audio	Finalist	
2009 14th	James Herriot's Treasury for Children (1992)	James Herriot	Jim Dale	Macmillan Audio	Winner	
2009 14th	Do Unto Otters (2007)	Laurie Keller	Jack Sundrud, Galen Fott, Rusty Young, David de Vries, Diana Canova, et al.	Weston Woods	Finalist	
2009 14th	Hip Hop Speaks to Children (2009)	Nikki Giovanni	Nikki Giovanni	Scourcebooks Jabberwocky	Finalist	
2009 14th	The Shoe Bird (2008)	Samuel Jones	Jim Dale	Brilliance Audio	Finalist	
2009 14th	What Do You Do with a Kangaroo? (1973)	Mercer Mayer	Jane Casserly	Scholastic Audio	Finalist	

=== 2010s ===
Year	Audiobook	Author(s)	Narrator(s)	Publisher	Result	Ref.
2010 15th	Louise, the Adventures of a Chicken (2008)	Kate DiCamillo	Barbara Rosenblat	Live Oak Media	Winner	
2010 15th	A Dog on His Own (2008)	Mary Jane Auch	William Dufris	Full Cast Audio	Finalist	
2010 15th	Arabel's Raven (1972)	Joan Aiken	Sneha Mathan	Listen & Live Audio	Finalist	
2010 15th	Friend or Fiend?: With the Pain and the Great One (2008)	Judy Blume	Kathleen McInerney and Judy Blume	Listening Library	Finalist	
2010 15th	Knuffle Bunny Too (2007)	Mo Willems	Mo Willems and Trixie Willems	Weston Woods	Finalist	
2011 16th	This Jazz Man (2006)	Karen Ehrhardt	James D-Train Williams	Live Oak Media	Winner	
2011 16th	One Beastly Beast (2007)	Garth Nix	Stig Wemyss	Bolinda Audio	Finalist	
2011 16th	Judy Moody & Stink: The Holly Joliday (2008)	Megan McDonald	Barbara Rosenblat	Brilliance	Finalist	
2011 16th	Despicable Me (2010)	Annie Auerbach	Tim Curry	Hachette Audio	Finalist	
2011 16th	Epossumondas Plays Possum (2009)	Coleen Salley	Cynthia Darlow	Recorded Books	Finalist	
2012 17th	Django, World's Greatest Jazz Guitarist (2009)	Bonnie Christensen	George Guidall	Live Oak Media	Winner	
2012 17th	Black Jack: The Ballad of Jack Johnson (2010)	Charles R. Smith, Jr.	Dion Graham	Live Oak Media	Finalist	
2012 17th	Looking Like Me (2009)	Walter Dean Myers	Dion Graham and Quincy Tyler Bernstine	Live Oak Media	Finalist	
2012 17th	Stone Soup (2003)	Jon J. Muth	B. D. Wong	Weston Woods	Finalist	
2012 17th	Wolf Pie (2010)	Brenda Seabrooke	Andrew Watts	Recorded Books	Finalist	
2013 18th	The Great Cake Mystery (2012)	Alexander McCall Smith	Adjoa Andoh	Listening Library	Winner	
2013 18th	Knuffle Bunny Free (2010)	Mo Willems	Mo Willems	Weston Woods	Finalist	
2013 18th	A Sick Day for Amos McGee (2010)	Philip C. Stead and Erin Stead	David de Vries	Weston Woods	Finalist	
2013 18th	Sylvester and the Magic Pebble (1969)	William Steig	James Earl Jones	Simon & Schuster Audio	Finalist	
2013 18th	We Are America (2011)	Walter Dean Myers	MacLeod Andrews, Olivia Duford, Dion Graham, Lizan Mitchell, Christopher Myers, Walter Dean Myers, Johanna Parker, Adriana Sananes, and Kaipo Schwab	Live Oak Media	Finalist	
2014 19th	Hooray for Anna Hibiscus! (2008)	Atinuke	Mutiyat Ade-Salu	Recorded Books	Winner	
2014 19th	Betty Bunny Loves Chocolate Cake (2011)	Michael B. Kaplan	Katherine Kellgren	Live Oak Media	Finalist	
2014 19th	Creepy Carrots! (2012)	Aaron Reynolds	James Naughton	Weston Woods	Finalist	
2014 19th	The Dark (2013)	Lemony Snicket	Neil Gaiman	Hachette Audio	Finalist	
2014 19th	Nelson Mandela (2013)	Kadir Nelson	Forest Whitaker	Weston Woods	Finalist	
2014 19th	Stink and the Freaky Frog Freakout (2013)	Megan McDonald	Barbara Rosenblat	Brilliance Audio	Finalist	
2015 20th	H.O.R.S.E.: A Game of Basketball and Imagination (2012)	Christopher Myers	Christopher Myers and Dion Graham	Live Oak Media	Winner	
2015 20th	Deep in the Swamp (2007)	Donna M. Bateman	Tom Chapin	Live Oak Media	Finalist	
2015 20th	Follow, Follow: A Book of Reverso Poems (2013)	Marilyn Singer	Marilyn Singer and Joe Morton	Live Oak Media	Finalist	
2015 20th	Josephine (2013)	Patricia Hruby Powell	Lizan Mitchell	Recorded Books	Finalist	
2015 20th	This Is Not My Hat (2012)	Jon Klassen	John Keating	Weston Woods	Finalist	
2015 20th	Timeless Tales of Beatrix Potter (1901–1930)	Beatrix Potter	Katherine Kellgren	Tantor Audio	Finalist	
2016 21st	Little Shop of Monsters (2015)	R. L. Stine and Marc Brown	Jack Black	Hachette Audio	Winner	
2016 21st	Appleblossom the Possum (2015)	Holly Goldberg Sloan	Dustin Hoffman	Listening Library/Penguin Random House Audio	Finalist	
2016 21st	Brother Hugo and the Bear (2014)	Katy Beebe and S. D. Schindler	Gildart Jackson	Dreamscape	Finalist	
2016 21st	Dory Fantasmagory (2014)	Abby Hanlon	Suzy Jackson	Recorded Books	Finalist	
2016 21st	The Eloise Collection (1955–1959)	Kay Thompson	Bernadette Peters with music by Anthony de Mare	Simon & Schuster Audio	Finalist	
2016 21st	Niño Wrestles the World (2013)	Yuyi Morales	Adriana Sananes	Dreamscape	Finalist	
2017 22nd	28 Days: Moments in Black History That Changed the World (2015)	Charles R. Smith, Jr.	Dion Graham, William Jackson Harper, Zainab Jah, January LaVoy, Robin Miles, Lizan Mitchell, Jonathan Earl Peck, and Carter Woodson Redwood	Live Oak Media	Winner	
2017 22nd	Island Treasures: Growing Up in Cuba (2015)	Alma Flor Ada	Trini Alvarado	Recorded Books	Finalist	
2017 22nd	The Quentin Blake and John Yeoman Collection (2016)	Quentin Blake and John Yeoman	Stephen Thorne	Bolinda Audio	Finalist	
2017 22nd	The Tale of Kitty-in-Boots (2016; written 1914)	Beatrix Potter	Helen Mirren	Listening Library	Finalist	
2017 22nd	Voice of Freedom: Fannie Lou Hamer (2015)	Carole Boston Weatherford	Janina Edwards	Dreamscape	Finalist	
2017 22nd	The Wooden Prince (2016)	John Claude Bemis	Ralph Lister	Oasis Audio	Finalist	
2018 23rd	Trombone Shorty (2015)	Troy Andrews	Dion Graham	Live Oak Media	Winner	
2018 23rd	Mother Bruce (2015)	Ryan T. Higgins	Robertson Dean	Weston Woods	Finalist	
2018 23rd	Poem for Peter: The Story of Ezra Jack Keats and the Creation of The Snowy Day (2016)	Andrea Davis Pinkney	Channie Waites	Recorded Books	Finalist	
2018 23rd	Princess Cora and the Crocodile (2017)	Laura Amy Schlitz	Davina Porter	Recorded Books	Finalist	
2018 23rd	A Sick Day for Amos McGee (2010)	Philip C. Stead	Jim Dale	Macmillan Audio	Finalist	
2019 24th	Before She Was Harriet (2017)	Lesa Cline-Ransome	SiSi Aisha Johnson, January LaVoy, Lisa Renee Pitts, and Bahni Turpin	Live Oak Media	Finalist	
2019 24th	Dreamers (2018)	Yuyi Morales	Adriana Sananes	Dreamscape	Finalist	
2019 24th	Esquivel!: Space-Age Sound Artist (2016)	Susan Wood	Brian Amador	Live Oak Media	Finalist	
2019 24th	Her Right Foot (2017)	Dave Eggers	Dion Graham	Recorded Books	Finalist	
2019 24th	We Found a Hat (2016)	Jon Klassen	Johnny Heller and Christopher Curry	Weston Woods	Finalist	

=== 2020s ===
Year	Audiobook	Author(s)	Narrator(s)	Publisher	Result	Ref.
2020 25th	The Pigeon HAS to Go to School! (2019)	Mo Willems	Mo Willems	Weston Woods	Winner	
2020 25th	How to Read a Book (2019)	Kwame Alexander	Kwame Alexander	HarperAudio	Finalist	
2020 25th	The Lion King (2019)	Elizabeth Rudnick and Disney Press	Janina Edwards	Blackstone Audio	Finalist	
2020 25th	Rumple Buttercup (2019)	Matthew Gray Gubler	Matthew Gray Gubler	Penguin Random House Audio	Finalist	
2020 25th	We Are Grateful: Otsaliheliga (2018)	Traci Sorell	Lauren Hummingbird, Agalisiga "Choogie" Mackey, Ryan Mackey, Traci Sorell, and Tonia Weavel	Live Oak Media	Finalist	
2020 25th	The Word Collector (2018)	Peter H. Reynolds	Guy Lockard	Weston Woods	Finalist	
2021 26th	The Overground Railroad	Lesa Cline-Ransome	Shayna Small and Dion Graham	Live Oak Media	Winner	
2021 26th	Going Down Home with Daddy (2019)	Kelly Starling Lyons	Daxton Edwards	Dreamscape Media LLC	Finalist	
2021 26th	Rise! From Caged Bird to Poet of the People, Maya Angelou	Bethany Hegedus	Cherise Boothe	Live Oak Media	Finalist	
2021 26th	Say Something	Peter H. Reynolds	Peter H. Reynolds	Weston Woods Studios	Finalist	
2021 26th	The Sesame Street Podcast with Foley and Friends	Sesame Workshop	Lindsey Briggs, Tyler Bunch, Ryan Dillon, and a full cast	Audible Studios	Finalist	
2021 26th	Stuck	Chris Grabenstein	Mark Sanderlin, Elizabeth Hess, Oliver Wyman, Farah Bala, Rita Wolf, Caroline Grogan, Cynthia Darlow, Mateo D'Amato, J.J. Myers, Neil Hellegers, Genesis Oliver, and Chris Grabenstein	Audible Originals	Finalist	
2022 27th	I and I Bob Marley	Tony Medina	Jaime Lincoln Smith and Tony Medina	Live Oak Media	Winner	
2022 27th	Boogie Boogie, Y'all	C. G. Esperanza	C. G. Esperanza	HarperAudio	Finalist	
2022 27th	The Couch Potato	Jory John	Kirby Heyborne	HarperAudio	Finalist	
2022 27th	Jasmine Toguchi, Mochi Queen	Debbi Michiko Florence	Allison Hiroto	OrangeSky Audio	Finalist	
2022 27th	Remember to Dream, Ebere	Cynthia Erivo	Cynthia Erivo	Hachette Audio	Finalist	
2023 28th	A Door Made for Me	Tyler Merritt	Tyler Merritt	Hachette Audio	Winner	
2023 28th	Our Table	Peter H. Reynolds	Peter H. Reynolds	Weston Woods Studios	Finalist	
2023 28th	Patchwork	Matt de la Peña	Philip Hernandez, Catherine Ho, Dion Graham, Finlay Stevenson, Arischa Conner, and Sunil Malhotra	Penguin Random House Audio	Finalist	
2023 28th	When Grandfather Flew	Patricia MacLachlan	Katie Schorr and George Guidall	Live Oak Media	Finalist	
2023 28th	Where Snow Angels Go	Maggie O'Farrell	Ruth Negga	Dreamscape Media	Finalist	
2024 29th	The Skull	Jon Klassen	Fairuza Balk and Jon Klassen	Dreamscape Media	Winner	
2024 29th	Carina Felina	Carmen Agra Deedy	Carmen Agra Deedy	Scholastic Audio	Finalist	
2024 29th	I Love You More Than You'll Ever Know	Leslie Odom Jr. and Nicolette Robinson	Leslie Odom Jr. and Nicolette Robinson	Macmillan Audio	Finalist	
2024 29th	Twelve Dinging Doorbells	Tameka Fryer Brown	January LaVoy	Listening Library	Finalist	
2024 29th	There Was a Party for Langston	Jason Reynolds	Jason Reynolds	Recorded Books	Finalist	
2025 30th	Nothing: John Cage and 4’33”	Nicholas Day	Fred Berman	Live Oak Media	Winner	
2025 30th	Coretta: The Autobiography of Mrs. Coretta Scott King	Coretta Scott King	January LaVoy	Macmillan Audio	Finalist	
2025 30th	I Am My Ancestors’ Wildest Dreams	Tanisia Moore	Nile Bullock	Scholastic Audio	Finalist	
2025 30th	Millie Fleur's Poison Garden	Christy Mandin	Elizabeth Knowelden	Scholastic Audio	Finalist	
2026 31st	Secrets of the Purple Pearl	Kate McKinnon	Kate McKinnon and Emily Lynne	Hachette Audio	Winner	
2026 31st	Benny on the Case	Wesley King	P. J. Ochlan	Dreamscape Media	Finalist	
2026 31st	How the Word Is Passed (2021)	Clint Smith and Sonja Cherry-Paul	Clint Smith	Hachette Audio	Finalist	
2026 31st	Pajammin'	Ziggy Marley	Ziggy Marley	HarperAudio	Finalist	
2026 31st	Prince Among Slaves	N. H. Senzai	Junior Nyong'o and N. H. Senzai	Penguin Random House Audio	Finalist	
