= Sherri Winston =

American children's author

- Occupations: Children's novelist, former columnist
- Writing career
- Years active: 2004 - present
- Genre: Children's literature
- Website: https://www.sherriwinston.com/

Sherri Winston is an American children’s novelist and former columnist. Her works include Lotus Bloom and the Afro Revolution, Shark Teeth, and the President of the Whole Fifth Grade series.

== Career ==
Prior to becoming a full-time writer, Winston was a lifestyle columnist with the Sun Sentinel. She published her first book, Acting, in 2004. The book is a young adult novel about an aspiring teen actor whose family life is upturned when her twin sister becomes pregnant.

In 2010, Winston published the novel President of the Whole Fifth Grade, which follows Brianna Justice, a girl competing to become the president of her fifth grade class. It was followed by President of the Whole Sixth Grade and President of the Whole Sixth Grade: Girl Code in 2015 and 2019 respectively.

In 2022, she wrote another middle grade novel, Lotus Bloom and the Afro Revolution, which won a BCALA Literary Award and was longlisted for the 2022 National Book Award for Young People's Literature. The book, which took inspiration from a real-life event Winston watched on the news, has the titular protagonist stand up against her school's administration after they threaten to suspend her by claiming her afro violates their dress code when she her tries to report a boy for bullying her.

In 2024, Winston released Shark Teeth, which follows Sharkita, a twelve-year-old girl with a neglectful mother who struggles with anxiety and caring for her younger siblings. The book won the Walter Dean Myers Award for Young Readers in 2025, and was also shortlisted for the Kirkus Prize for Young Reader's Literature and the Schneider Family Book Award for Middle Grade Books.

Winston's other novels include The Braid Girls, where two friends attempting to start a braiding business deal with one’s previously unknown half-sister coming to live with them, The Sweetest Sound, about a ten-year-old aspiring singer with severe anxiety, and Destiny of the Diamond Princess, where an adopted girl learns her biological family is the royalty of the fictional nation of Maliwanda. She both wrote and illustrated 2019's Jada Sly, Artist and Spy, which has the eponymous ten-year-old spy attempt to solve the mysteries surrounding her mother's alleged death.

== Publications ==
=== Stand-alone novels ===
- Acting. Marshall Cavendish. October 1, 2004. ISBN 978-0761451730.
- The Kayla Chronicles. Little, Brown Books for Young Readers. March 6, 2008. ISBN 978-0316114301.
- The Sweetest Sound. Little, Brown Books for Young Readers. January 3, 2017. ISBN 978-0316302951.
- Jada Sly, Artist & Spy. Little, Brown Books for Young Readers. May 14, 2019. ISBN 978-0316505369.
- Great Escapes #2: Journey to Freedom, 1838. Illustrated by James Bernardin. HarperCollins. April 28, 2020. ISBN 978-0062860392.
- Lotus Bloom and the Afro Revolution. Bloomsbury Children's Books. September 6, 2022. ISBN 978-1547608461.
- The Braid Girls. Little, Brown Books for Young Readers. June 13, 2023. ISBN 978-0316461610.
- Shark Teeth. Bloomsbury Children's Books. January 16, 2024. ISBN 978-1547608508.
- Destiny of the Diamond Princess. Bloomsbury Children's Books. January 20, 2026. ISBN 978-1547617029.

=== President of the Whole Fifth Grade ===
- President of the Whole Fifth Grade. Little, Brown Books for Young Readers. January 1, 2010. ISBN 978-0316114325.
- President of the Whole Sixth Grade. Little, Brown Books for Young Readers. November 3, 2015. ISBN 978-0316377232.
- President of the Whole Sixth Grade: Girl Code. Little, Brown Books for Young Readers. April 19, 2019. ISBN 978-0316505284.
- The Summer Before the Whole Sixth Grade. Little, Brown Books for Young Readers. April 6, 2027. ISBN 978-0316605281.

=== Wednesday and Woof ===
- Wednesday and Woof #1: Catastrophe. HarperCollins. May 24, 2022. ISBN 978-0062975997.
- Wednesday and Woof #2: New Pup on the Block. HarperCollins. May 24, 2022. ISBN 978-0062976086.
- Wednesday and Woof #3: The Runaway Robot. HarperCollins. November 15, 2022. ISBN 978-0062976109.

=== Anthology contributions ===
- Singer, Marilyn, ed. (May 5, 2013). "Snow". Face Relations: 11 Stories About Seeing Beyond Color. Simon & Schuster Books for Young Readers. ISBN 978-1442496163.

== Accolades ==
Awards and nominations
Year	Title	Award/Honor	Result	Ref.
2019	Jada Sly, Artist and Spy	Agatha Award for Best Children/Young Adult Fiction	Shortlisted	
2022	Lotus Bloom and the Afro Revolution	National Book Award for Young People's Literature	Longlisted	
2023	Lotus Bloom and the Afro Revolution	BCALA Literary Award — Children & Youth Literary Award for Fiction	Won	
2025	Shark Teeth	Walter Dean Myers Award for Young Readers	Won	
2025	Shark Teeth	Kirkus Prize for Young Reader's Literature	Shortlisted	
2025	Shark Teeth	Schneider Family Book Award - Middle Grade	Shortlisted	
