= Roller Girl =

2015 young adult graphic novel by Victoria Jamieson

- Author: Victoria Jamieson
- Cover artist: Victoria Jamieson
- Language: English
- Set in: contemporary Portland, Oregon
- Publisher: Penguin Random House
- Publication date: March 10, 2015
- Pages: 240
- Awards: 2016 Newbery Honor
- ISBN: 9780525429678
- Website: Publisher's website

Roller Girl is a young adult graphic novel written and illustrated by Victoria Jamieson, published by Dial Books for Young Readers in 2015. It is set in contemporary Portland, Oregon and details how the hero, Astrid, becomes a roller derby skater. It was named a Newbery Honor book in 2016.

== Plot ==
Astrid's mother takes her and her best friend, Nicole, on numerous "Evenings of Cultural Enrichment" which often confuse, bore, or inappropriately amuse the two girls; one night in fifth grade, they attend a roller derby match between the Oregon City Rollergirls and the Rose City Rollers. Astrid asks her mother's permission to attend the Rollers' Junior Roller Derby Camp that summer, assuming that Nicole will also join with her. Instead, Nicole chooses to attend dance camp with Astrid's longtime rival Rachel.

Astrid arrives at camp, but hesitates when she sees how mature all the other skaters are. She becomes friends with a girl named Zoey, and pairs up with her in most of the classes. She also meets Braidy Punch, a skater eager to tear down any rivals. She is doing badly in class until she notices that most of the girls have their hair dyed. She asks Zoey to dye her hair blue. They are putting up posters together when they run into Nicole and Rachel. Astrid has an argument with them and afterwards starts working extra hard during practice. When roles for the bout are released, Zoey is assigned jammer, not Astrid. As a result, the two have an argument and stop talking.

Eventually, Astrid's mother learns the truth after talking to Nicole's mother at a grocery store. She and her daughter have an honest conversation, and Astrid confesses that her actions were only because she simply did not know how to explain to her that her friendship with Nicole has changed. Afterward, Astrid goes to Nicole's house to apologize to her and her mother. Later on, she makes a truce with her and Rachel by giving them a ticket to her roller derby bout.

At the bout, Astrid scores the winning point for her team and makes up with Zoey, but injures her foot while up against Braidy Punch. Nicole gives her flowers and asks her out to dinner, which Astrid politely rejects and instead chooses to stay with her team, ending their friendship on agreeable terms. The novel ends with Astrid having found her true self and moving on from her friendship with Nicole.

== Development ==
Jamieson attended her first roller derby match in 2008 and began to be involved with the Rollers after moving to Portland with her husband in 2009, eventually joining under the derby name 'Winnie the Pow'.

== Reception ==
In 2016, the American Library Association named Roller Girl to its list of Newbery Honor winners, alongside Kimberly Brubaker Bradley's The War That Saved My Life and Pam Muñoz Ryan's Echo. It won the 2018 Young Hoosier Book Award (Intermediate) and was named to the 2016 Bank Street Children's Best Books of the Year List.
