= Revolution in Our Time =

2021 book by Kekla Magoon

Revolution in Our Time: The Black Panther Party's Promise to the People
- Author: Kekla Magoon
- Language: English
- Genre: Nonfiction
- Published: November 23, 2021
- Publisher: Candlewick Press

Revolution in Our Time: The Black Panther Party's Promise to the People is a nonfiction book about the Black Panther Party, written by Kekla Magoon and published November 23, 2021 by Candlewick Press. In 2021, the book was a finalist for the National Book Award for Young People's Literature.

== Reception ==
Revolution in Our Time is a Junior Library Guild book.

The book received starred reviews from Booklist, Horn Book,Kirkus Reviews, Publishers Weekly, and School Library Journal.

Kirkus Reviews referred to the book as a "highly readable and not-to-be-missed story of America’s history and current reality" Publishers Weekly called it a "detailed, accessible text" that "presents an incisive, in-depth study of the Black Panther Party." Booklist wrote, "This rounded accounting of a pivotal but often-overlooked time in U.S. history should be widely read." The Horn Book similarly wrote that "this compelling work would be invaluable for both individual and classroom reading," and Shelf Awareness said it is "a must-have for American history units that will spend more time in readers' hands than on the shelves."

Horn Book, Kirkus Reviews, and Publishers Weekly named Revolution in Our Time one of the best young adult books of 2021.

The audiobook, narrated by Tyla Collier, received a positive review from Lit Hub.

Awards for Revolution in Our Time
Year	Award	Result	Ref.
2021	Los Angeles Times Book Prize for Young Adult Literature	Finalist	
2021	National Book Award for Young People's Literature	Finalist	
2022	Coretta Scott King Book Award for Author	Honor	
2022	Michael L. Printz Award	Honor	
2022	ALSC Notable Children's Books	Selection	
2022	Walter Dean Myers Award for Teen	Finalist	
