= Concrete Rose (novel) =

2021 young adult novel by Angie Thomas

- Author: Angie Thomas
- Published: January 12, 2021
- Publisher: Balzer + Bray
- Publication place: Africa
- Pages: 368
- ISBN: 9780062846716
- Followed by: The Hate U Give

Concrete Rose is a young adult novel by Angie Thomas, published January 12, 2021, by Balzer + Bray.

== Critical reception ==
Concrete Rose was generally well-received, including starred reviews from Booklist, Kirkus Reviews, School Library Journal, and Shelf Awareness.

Time's Cleyvis Natera stated, "Thomas' genius is her ability to craft one man's history in a way that illuminates the forces that brought us to this critical juncture." Nic Stone of The Washington Post echoed the sentiment, saying,

[O]ne of my favorite things about Angie Thomas is that she's always willing to dig a little deeper, to peel back another layer. This is what makes her latest novel, Concrete Rose — her best, in my opinion — a gift. It not only eviscerates the 'fast Black girl' stereotype and debunks the myth of the Bailing Black Baby Daddy, it gives us insight into the life of a boy most people wouldn't even attempt to look at beyond the surface.

The audiobook, narrated by Dion Graham, also received a positive review from Booklist, which said,

Graham is a natural and convincing storyteller. Graham's solo narration showcases a keen ability to embody both the innocent and the often-troubled side of Maverick. Graham's voice also adapts well to fast-moving scenes, acquainting listeners to the edginess of street life as well as the unrelenting wisdom of a community that continues to grow amid adversity.

== Awards and honors ==
Concrete Rose was a New York Times and IndieBound bestseller. Kirkus Reviews named it one of the best young adult novels of 2021. Both the book and audiobook editions are Junior Library Guild selections.

Awards and honors for Concrete Rose
Year	Award	Result	Ref.
2021	Cybils Award for Young Adult Fiction	Finalist	
2021	Goodreads Choice Award for Young Adult Fiction	Nominee	
2022	Michael L. Printz Award	Honor	
2022	Carnegie Medal for Young Adult Fiction	Longlist	

== Inspiration ==
Thomas was inspired to write the book due to readers' interest of Maverick as a dad in her novel The Hate U Give.

So many kids would tell me Maverick is the best dad they've seen; they wish their dad was like him. We know he was once in a gang and did drugs — and for some people, that doesn't line up with the father and the man we see. I started to think about the character on a deeper level. Having conversations with Russell Hornsby, who played Maverick in the movie, really sparked the flame.
