= The Lesbiana's Guide to Catholic School =

2022 novel by Sonora Reyes

- Author: Sonora Reyes
- Language: English
- Genre: Young adult fiction
- Set in: Phoenix, Arizona
- Publisher: Balzer + Bray
- Publication date: May 17, 2022
- Publication place: United States
- Media type: Print / Digital
- Pages: 385
- Awards: Lambda Literary Award for Young Adult Literature (2023)
- ISBN: 978-0-06-306023-4
- OCLC: 1264273041

The Lesbiana's Guide to Catholic School is the debut young adult novel by American writer Sonora Reyes, published by Balzer + Bray in 2022. It was a finalist for the 2022 National Book Award for Young People's Literature and won the 2023 Lambda Literary Award for Young Adult Literature.

== Plot ==
Sixteen-year-old Yamilet Flores, a resident of Phoenix, Arizona, is adjusting to her new, predominantly white Catholic school and reeling from being outed as a lesbian within her social circle. As she struggles to keep her sexuality a secret from her classmates and religious mother, she bonds with a classmate, Bo, who is out and proud.

== Themes and background ==
The book speaks to the theme of "found family", as well as self-acceptance, and the relationship between queerness and religion. Yamilet is frustrated that she has to hide her sexuality at school and from her mother for fear of rejection.

Sonora Reyes drew on their experience growing up as a closeted queer Catholic school student to inform the book's content.

== Reception ==
Selenia Paz reviewed the book in the School Library Journal as "filled with humor and love, this fast-paced novel will have readers immersed in Yamilet's world, rooting for her and her loved ones all the way." The book was described positively in Kirkus Reviews: "The portrayal of found family and the threads of love and acceptance woven into this story make it a satisfying read with a hopeful ending." April Spisak praised the authors' portrayal of both difficult and joyful elements in the Bulletin of the Center for Children's Books: "the ultimate tone is a celebratory one, highlighting the mom who loves her kids ferociously and the alternative prom held after same-sex couples are forbidden at school events." The Lesbian Review concluded that those "in the mood to devour an engrossing, poignant and uplifting young adult novel [need] look no further because this story is filled with so much hope and love."

== Awards and honors ==
The Chicago Public Library included The Lesbiana's Guide to Catholic School on their list of the best young adult novels of 2022. The following year, it was included on Young Adult Library Services Association's list of Teens' Top Ten.

Year	Award	Result	Ref.
2022	Goodreads Choice Award for Young Adult Fiction	Nominated	
2022	National Book Award for Young People's Literature	Finalist	
2023	Lambda Literary Award for Young Adult Literature	Won	
2023	Pura Belpré Award	Honor	
2023	Walter Dean Myers Award	Honor	
2023	William C. Morris Award	Finalist	
