= The Rock and the River =

2009 novel by Kekla Magoon

- Author: Kekla Magoon
- Language: English
- Genre: Young adult, Historical fiction
- Publisher: Aladdin Publisher
- Publication date: January 6, 2009
- Publication place: United States
- Media type: Print
- ISBN: 9781416975823

The Rock and the River is a young adult historical fiction novel by Kekla Magoon, published January 6, 2009 by Aladdin. It is Magoon's debut novel.

== Summary ==
The Rock and the River is a novel about the civil rights movement following fictional character Sam Childs. He is the son of a Civil Rights Activist named Roland Childs who is actively involved with Dr. Martin Luther King Jr. Sam is thirteen years old and still figuring out who he is. His older brother, and best friend, Stick, starts to drift away, then Sam finds something that will change the rest of his life. This book is a work of historical fiction. Some events (like the Civil Rights Movement) are real, but the characters aren't.

== Reviews ==
The book received starred reviews from Booklist, as well as a positive review from Bulletin of the Center for Children’s Books and Kirkus.

In their review, Kirkus wrote, "Magoon is unflinching in her depictions of police brutality and racism" and "offers readers a perspective that is rarely explored, showing that racial prejudices were not confined to the South and that the Civil Rights Movement was a truly national struggle."

The audiobook, narrated by Dion Graham, received a positive review from Booklist.

Awards and accolades for The Rock and the River
Year	Award	Result	Ref.
2010	John Steptoe New Talent Award	Winner	
2010	NAACP Image Award in Outstanding Literary Work - Youth/Teens	Nominee	
2010	Association for Library Service to Children's Notable Children's Books for Older Readers	Selection	
2010	YALSA's Best Books for Young Adults	Selection	
2011	Audie Award for Young Adult Title	Winner	
2011	YALSA's Amazing Audiobooks for Young Adults	Top 10	
2012	Rebecca Caudill Young Readers' Book Award	Nominee	
2012	Booklist Editors' Choice: Books for Youth	Selection	
