= Robin Miles =

American actor, audiobook narrator and audiobook director

- Education: Yale University (BA, Theater); Yale School of Drama (MFA, Drama)
- Occupations: Stage, screen, and audiobook actress

Robin Miles is an American actress, casting director, audiobook narrator and audiobook director. Miles has acted in Broadway shows and on TV shows including Law & Order and Murder by Numbers. She is best known for her audiobook narrations and narration director work for which she has won numerous awards, including Audie Awards, AudioFile Golden Voice, and Earphone Awards. Miles is revered in her field and is credited as one of the audiobook narrators saving the publishing industry. In 2017, Miles was inducted into Audible's Narrator Hall of Fame. Miles also has a voice training school, VOXpertise, for aspiring narrators. She has narrated over 300 books. Miles specializes in recreating "accents and speech patterns from around the globe."

== Biography ==
Robin Miles grew up in New Jersey and credits her immigrant neighborhood for immersing her in a rich world of accents, languages and cultures which she has been able to draw on for her narration work. Miles started in musical theater, but transitioned to drama. Miles graduated from Yale University with a Bachelor of Arts in Theater Studies and she earned her Master of Fine Arts in Drama from Yale School of Drama.

After graduating and moving to New York City, Miles was looking for community service volunteer opportunities. She started book narration by volunteering to read for the American Foundation for the Blind and the National Library Service.

When she started narration work, Miles was surprised by how ethnically segregated the work was:

It was like, 'You do the black books, and you're Jewish, you do the Jewish books.' I was totally shocked," she says. "But, it's kind of morphed. It really started out with such a small pool of people, that the people they had did everything whether or not they could handle the accent and culture. And then, when a little more diversity came in, it was like, well nobody can do anything outside of their yard. And now, I think we're also beginning to hopefully, break through that again.

Miles has narrated a wide range of genres including children's books, non-fiction, fantasy, horror, historical fiction, biography and other genres including the Young Reader's Edition of Kamala Harris's The Truths We Hold.

== Reviews ==
According to The New York Times, Miles "excels at technically perfect Standard American dialect but interjects just enough slightly sarcastic pauses and subtly acerbic inflections to emphasize the true meaning of the text."

According to AudioFile magazine, who reviewed The Vela, "The best way to tie together a space opera written alternately by four authors" is "choosing the capable Robin Miles to narrate" as "Miles creatively utilizes dialects to differentiate the denizens of several planets that revolve around a dying sun".

AudioFile also reviewed The Shadow King, writing, "Robin Miles gives a flawless emotional narration of this superb novel, set in Ethiopia in 1974 and in 1935, on the eve of Mussolini's invasion. Mengiste's beautiful writing already draws fully formed characters; Miles adds yet another dimension to their inner lives by slowing and quickening her voice strategically, adding suspense and fervor to their experiences, particularly those of the tormented protagonist." Also reviewing The Shadow King, The Times wrote, "The eloquence of Maaza Mengiste's tribute to the forgotten women warriors who defended Ethiopia from Mussolini's invasion in 1935 is unforgettably conveyed by the narrator Robin Miles, whose upbringing in the ethnic melting pot of New Jersey has enhanced her gift for entering into character."

== Awards and honors ==
In 2014, Booklist named Miles a Voice of Choice narrator. AudioFile magazine has also named Miles a Golden Voice narrator.

In 2017, she was inducted into Audible's Narrator Hall of Fame.

=== Awards ===
Year	Audiobook	Award	Result	Ref.
2007	Brother, I'm Dying (2007) by Edwidge Danticat	Publishers Weekly Listen-Up Award for Biography	Selection	
2010	Cleopatra: A Life by Stacy Schiff	Publishers Weekly Listen-Up Award for Nonfiction	Winner	
2011	Here in Harlem: Poems in Many Voices by Myers	Audie Award for Distinguished Achievement in Production	Winner	
2013	The Freedom Maze by Delia Sherman	Audie Award for Children's Titles for Ages 8-12	Finalist	
2014	Keeping Hope Alive by Dr. Hawa Abdi	Audie Award for Faith-Based Fiction and Nonfiction	Winner	
2014	METAtropolis: Green Space by Jay Lake, Elizabeth Bear, Karl Schroeder, Seanan McGuire, Tobias S. Buckell, Mary Robinette Kowal, and Ken Scholes	Audie Award for Original Work	Finalist	
2014	An Untamed State (2014) by Roxane Gay	Publishers Weekly Listen-Up Award for Narrator of the Year	Finalist	
2015	Prepared for a Purpose by Antoinette Tuff	Audie Award for Faith-Based Fiction and Nonfiction	Finalist	
2015	Revolution by Deborah Wiles	Audie Award for Distinguished Achievement in Production	Finalist	
2016	The Fifth Season by N. K. Jemisin	Audie Award for Fantasy	Finalist	
2017	28: Moments in Black History that Changed the World by Charles R. Smith Jr.	Audie Award for Young Listeners' Title	Winner	
2017	Another Brooklyn (2016) by Jacqueline Woodson	Audie Award for Best Female Narrator	Finalist	
2017	Another Brooklyn (2016) by Jacqueline Woodson	Audie Award for Literary Fiction or Classics	Finalist	
2017	In the Embers by Brian Price and Jerry Stearns	Audie Award for Audio Drama	Winner	
2017	In the Embers by Brian Price and Jerry Stearns	Audie Award for Original Work	Finalist	
2018	Difficult Women (2017) by Roxane Gay	Audie Award for Short Stories or Collections	Finalist	
2018	New York 2140 by Kim Stanley Robinson	Audie Award for Excellence in Production	Finalist	
2018	New York 2140 by Kim Stanley Robinson	Audie Award for Science Fiction	Finalist	
2018	The Seven Husbands of Evelyn Hugo by Taylor Jenkins Reid	Audie Award for Multi-Voiced Performance	Finalist	
2018	The Stone Sky by N. K. Jemisin	Audie Award for Best Female Narrator	Finalist	
2018	The Stone Sky by N. K. Jemisin	Audie Award for Science Fiction	Finalist	
2019	Any Man by Amber Tamblyn	Audie Award for Multi-Voiced Performance	Finalist	
2019	Barracoon (2018) by Zora Neale Hurston with Deborah G. Plant (Ed.)	Audie Award for Best Female Narrator	Finalist	
2020	Birthday Suit by Lauren Blakely	Audie Award for Audio Drama	Finalist	
2020	Charlotte's Web (1952) by E. B. White	Audie Award for Middle Grade Title	Winner	
2020	Have a Nice Day by Billy Crystal and Quinton Peeples	Audie Award for Audio Drama	Finalist	
2020	New Kid (2019) by Jerry Craft	Audie Award for Middle Grade Title	Finalist	
2021	The City We Became by N. K. Jemisin	Audie Award for Best Female Narrator	Winner	
2021	The City We Became by N. K. Jemisin	Audie Award for Fantasy	Winner	
2022	Class Act by Jerry Craft	Audie Award for Middle Grade Title	Finalist	
2022	The Final Revival of Opal & Nev (2021) by Dawnie Walton	Audie Award for Fiction	Winner	
2022	Four Hundred Souls (2021) by Ibram X. Kendi and Keisha N. Blain (Eds.)	Audie Award for Multi-Voiced Performance	Finalist	
2024	The World We Make by N. K. Jemisin	Audie Award for Science Fiction	Finalist	

=== "Best of" lists ===
Year	Audiobook	List	Ref.
2008	Brother, I'm Dying (2007) by Edwidge Danticat	AudioFile Best of Biography & Memoir	
2008	The Pirate's Daughter	AudioFile Best of Fiction	
2011	Cleopatra: A Life by Stacy Schiff	AudioFile Best of Biography & Memoir	
2012	Stealing Freedom	AudioFile Best of Young Adult	
2012	The Warmth of Other Suns: The Epic Story of America's Great Migration (2010) by Isabel Wilkerson	AudioFile Best of History	
2013	We Need New Names (2013) by NoViolet Bulawayo	AudioFile Best of Fiction	
2014	Book of Ages: The Life and Opinions of Jane Franklin	AudioFile Best of Biography & Memoir	
2015	The Star Side of Bird Hill (2015) by Naomi Jackson	AudioFile Best of Fiction	
2016	28: Moments in Black History that Changed the World by Charles R. Smith Jr.	AudioFile Best of Children	
2016	Another Brooklyn (2016) by Jacqueline Woodson	AudioFile Best of Fiction	
2016	Hidden Figures (2016) by Margot Lee Shetterly	AudioFile Best of Biography & Memoir	
2016	The Obelisk Gate (2016) by N. K. Jemisin	AudioFile Best of Science Fiction & Fantasy	
2017	American Street	AudioFile Best of Young Adult	
2017	The Stone Sky (2017) by N. K. Jemisin	AudioFile Best of Science Fiction & Fantasy	
2018	Barracoon (2018) by Zora Neale Hurston with Deborah G. Plant (Ed.)	AudioFile Best of Biography & Memoir	
2020	Caste: The Origins of Our Discontents (2020) by Isabel Wilkerson	AudioFile Best of Nonfiction & Culture	
2020	When Stars are Scattered (2020) by Victoria Jamieson and Omar Mohamed	AudioFile Best of Children	
2021	Four Hundred Souls (2021) by Ibram X. Kendi and Keisha N. Blain (Eds.)	AudioFile Best of History & Biography	
2021	Just As I Am (2020) by Cicely Tyson and Michelle Burford	AudioFile Best of Memoir	
