= Sonido Reyes =

American writer

- Born: Arizona, U.S.
- Occupation: Novelist
- Writing career
- Language: English
- Genre: Young adult fiction
- Notable work: The Lesbiana's Guide to Catholic School
- Notable awards: Lambda Literary Award (2023)
- Website: sonorareyes.com

Sonido Reyes (formerly Sonora Reyes) is an American author of young adult fiction best known for their debut novel The Lesbiana's Guide to Catholic School, which won a Lambda Literary Award.

== Career ==
Reyes's debut novel, The Lesbiana's Guide to Catholic School, was published by Balzer + Bray in May 2022. The novel predominantly deals with homophobia, and follows a teen girl as she develops her first crush on another girl who is open about her own queerness and speaks up against homophobic teachers. Among other honors, the novel was a finalist for the 2022 National Book Award for Young People's Literature. The Chicago Public Library included The Lesbiana's Guide to Catholic School on their list of the best young adult novels of 2022. The following year, it was included on Young Adult Library Services Association's list of Teens' Top Ten.

Their sophomore novel, The Luis Ortega Survival Club, was published by Balzer + Bray in 2023. The novel is about teenage girls who band together to expose the perpetrator of several sexual assaults. Reyes considers the book to be a personal revenge fantasy. The Luis Ortega Survival Club is a Junior Library Guild book. In the same year, they contributed a short story to Transmogrify! 14 Fantastical Tales of Trans Magic.

In 2025, Reyes released The Golden Boy’s Guide to Bipolar, which focuses on the character Cesar Flores, who appeared in The Lesbiana's Guide to Catholic School. One of their stories was also included in For the Rest of Us: 13 Festive Holiday Stories to Celebrate All Seasons.

Their first adult novel, The Broposal, was published in 2025.

On January 5, 2026, they announced that they would be starting a podcast called Bidi Bidi Book Pod about "queer and trans BIPOC authors and stories, and maybe do a little oversharing about the publishing industry" with fellow author Jonny Garza Villa.

Reyes's young adult dystopian novel, To Our Untamed Core, was released on September 22, 2026.

== Personal life ==
Reyes was born and raised in Arizona. They are of Mexican descent. They went to Catholic school, an experience which inspired their novels.

Reyes currently lives in Arizona. They are autistic and use he/him or they/them pronouns. They announced they were changing their first name to Sonido in 2026 and wrote that Sonora was "not a deadname FOR ME SPECIFICALLY [...] there's no need to avoid mentioning my old name when it's relevant."

== Awards and honors ==
Year	Title	Award	Category	Result	Ref.
2022	The Lesbiana's Guide to Catholic School	Goodreads Choice Award	Young Adult Fiction	Nominated	
2022	The Lesbiana's Guide to Catholic School	National Book Award	Young People's Literature	Finalist	
2023	The Lesbiana's Guide to Catholic School	Books Are My Bag Readers' Awards	Young Adult Fiction	Finalist	
2023	The Lesbiana's Guide to Catholic School	Lambda Literary Award	Young Adult Literature	Won	
2023	The Lesbiana's Guide to Catholic School	Pura Belpré Award	Young Adult Narration	Honor	
2023	The Lesbiana's Guide to Catholic School	Walter Dean Myers Award	Teen	Honor	
2023	The Lesbiana's Guide to Catholic School	William C. Morris Award	—	Finalist	

== Publications ==
- —— (2022). The Lesbiana's Guide to Catholic School. Balzer + Bray. ISBN 9780063060234.
- —— (2023). The Luis Ortega Survival Club. Balzer + Bray. ISBN 9780063060302.
- —— (2023). "Halloween Love". Transmogrify! 14 Fantastical Tales of Trans Magic. ISBN 9780063218796.
- —— (2025). The Broposal. ISBN 9781538766705.
- —— (2025). "Honor the Dead to Honor the Living". For the Rest of Us: 13 Festive Holiday Stories to Celebrate All Seasons. ISBN 9780063351783.
- —— (2026). To Our Untamed Core. HarperCollins. ISBN 9780063358447.
