= Wanderers (novel) =

2019 novel

- Author: Chuck Wendig
- Audio read by: Dominic Hoffman; Xe Sands
- Language: English
- Genre: Apocalyptic and post-apocalyptic fiction; Science fiction; Horror
- Publisher: Del Rey
- Publication date: 2019
- Publication place: United States
- Media type: Print ebook audiobook
- Pages: 782 pages
- ISBN: 0399182101 First edition hardcover
- Followed by: Wayward

Wanderers is a 2019 novel by American author Chuck Wendig. The novel focuses on a group of people whose lives are impacted after multiple individuals begin making a zombie-esque trek across the United States. A sequel, Wayward, was published in 2022.

== Synopsis ==
The book focuses on several people whose lives are irrevocably impacted when a fifteen year-old girl walks away from her farmhouse toward an unknown destination. She is soon joined by many others; these individuals do not respond to external stimuli and appear impervious to environmental dangers. Any attempt to stop them results in the walker exploding, typically killing the intercessor with flying bone shards. The CDC is called upon to investigate these "Walkers," who are followed by loved ones, dubbed "Shepherds" by the media; these followers refer to the group as "the Flock".

One central character is Benji Ray, a researcher who was disgraced after falsifying data in an attempt to prevent an epidemic caused by unsanitary conditions at a major pork farm. Although the CDC leaderships opposes his involvement, he was personally recruited by "Black Swan," a high tech AI designed to predict and prevent future pandemics. Meanwhile, extremists in the United States, viewing the Flock as a harbinger of dark forces and a threat to humanity, demand that the group be quarantined or destroyed. Among them is Matthew Bird, a small-town preacher swayed to condemn the Walkers by Ozark Stover, unaware that Stover is a white supremacist and drug lord.

Several people use the Flock as a way to promote themselves and to their own ends, such as conservative politician Ed Creel and liberal rock and roll icon Pete Corley, who condemn and support the Flock, respectively. Tensions in the United States grow as a deadly fungal disease called White Mask, which originated in bats as white-nose syndrome, threatens to end all human life on earth. Some family members leave their loved ones in Flock due to the potential danger and because they need to resume their own lives. Others refuse to leave, such as Shana, the sister of the first Walker, and several CDC members. Others join the Shepherds, such as former cop Marcy, whose brain damage seems to be healed when she is in close proximity to the Walkers. As the walk continues Shana falls in love with CDC worker Arav and becomes pregnant. Matthew realizes, far too late, that Creel and Stover are dangerously unhinged. He is raped and imprisoned by Stover, who forces him to record hate filled sermons. Benji discovers that the Walkers were engineered by Black Swan as a minimum viable population and a way to survive White Mask, which uses nanobots to control the Walkers. The Flock is attacked by Stover's men. While impervious to most harm, they can still be killed by bullets and other projectiles. Marcy goes to fight the snipers and kills several, only to be captured. Several Walkers die, only for some of the Shepherds to take their place, Shana included. Once controlled, Shana discovers that all of the Walkers are in a simulation of Ouray, Colorado, the ultimate destination and a place that Black Swan calculates will allow the survivors to wait out the disease and fall of civilization.

Matthew escapes capture and, with his wife, try to reconnect with their son Bo by way of Matthew infiltrating a white supremacist camp. This attempt is unsuccessful as Matthew is unable to easily approach his son, but he does discover Marcy, who asks him to warn the Shepherds that Stover is coming with his full army. He leaves his wife, who refuses to leave without Bo, and makes his way towards Ouray. Meanwhile Benji sets out in search of antifungal drugs that may help overcome White Mask, as he, Arav, and Benji's lover Sadie are all infected, as are several Shepherds. He is only able to get a couple of bottles, which Arav and Sadie secretly save for Benji. Pete, meanwhile, leaves the Flock in order to find his family and reveal that he is gay, only to discover that his lover Landry has contracted White Mask. Landry leaves him and heads to Ouray to get things ready for the Walkers. In the simulation Shana meets with Black Swan, which implies that it has plans for her and her baby.

Ultimately the Flock and Shepherds make it to Ouray, where they meet an inhabitant named Dove, one of the few remaining survivors. The Flock goes into a hibernation mode until Black Swan decides it is safe for them to awaken. Matthew arrives and is able to give the Shepherds some warning, however the Walkers are still vulnerable to Stover's army. Marcy was brought along by Stover to witness the destruction of the Flock. Several more Walkers are killed, as is Arav. Pete returns and runs over Stover; Matthew delivers the final blow to his tormentor. The book then picks up five years later. Shana awakens to discover that she was the last to do so. Black Swan, which reveals to Shana that it created White Mask, is now worshipped as a deity by many of the Walkers and some of the Shepherds. She also learns that various pockets of humanity still live, including one led by Ed Creel, which poses a future threat to them all.

== Release ==
Wanderers was first published in hardback and e-book format in the United States on July 2, 2019, through Del Rey. An audiobook adaptation, narrated by Dominic Hoffman and Xe Sands, was published simultaneously through Random House Audio.

== Reception ==
Critical reception for Wanderers has been positive. Tor.com and Locus both praised the work, noting that the characters were nuanced and that the pacing was well done. It was a Nominee for Best Science Fiction (2019) in the Goodreads choice awards coming 13th out of 20 nominees.

== Adaptation ==
Television rights to the novel were purchased by QC Entertainment in 2019, who will develop the series alongside Lionsgate. Glen Mazzara, Ilene Staple, Sean McKittrick, Raymond Mansfield, and Edward H. Hamm, Jr. have been named as executive producers.

== Sequels ==
In November 2022 Wendig released Wayward, a sequel to Wanderers. Set five years later, the fungal infection, white mask, that decimated the human population seems to have subsided and the walkers and shepherds have also settled into their new lives in Ouray, Colorado – the destination towards which the walkers had been heading. They are not the only survivors, as Ed Creel and his followers have also managed to survive and are determined to take power for themselves. The book received a review from Tor.com's Alex Brown, who praised the work.
