= Shark Teeth (novel) =

2024 novel by Sherri Winston

- Author: Sherri Winston
- Publisher: Bloomsbury
- Publication date: January 16, 2024
- Pages: 304
- ISBN: 9781547608508

Shark Teeth is a 2024 middle grade novel by Sherri Winston. It follows Sharkita, a twelve-year-old girl dealing with managing a neglectful mother and ensuring her younger siblings are taken of. It won the Walter Dean Myers Award for Young Readers in 2025.

== Plot ==
After having been sent to separate foster care homes over the summer due to neglect, twelve-year-old Sharkita 'Kita' returns to her mother and is reunited with her siblings, five-year-old Lilli and eight-year-old Lamar, who has fetal alcohol spectrum disorder. Bullied due to her hyperdontia and anxious over her mother's irresponsible actions, she finds solace in the school's baton twirling team.

== Reception ==
Publishers Weekly, School Library Journal, and Kirkus Reviews all gave Shark Teeth starred reviews. Kirkus Reviews dubbed the book "an outstanding depiction of the impact that family stressors can have on a household’s youngest members," while Publisher Weekly described it as a "harrowing, compassionate read."

=== Accolades ===
Year	Award/Honor	Result	Ref.
2025	Walter Dean Myers Award for Young Readers	Won	
2025	Kirkus Prize for Young Reader's Literature	Shortlisted	
2025	Schneider Family Book Award - Middle Grade	Honored	
2024	Kirkus Reviews Best Middle Grade Books of the Year	Included	
2024	Publishers Weekly Best Middle Grade Books of the Year	Included	
2024	School Library Journal Best Books of the Year	Included	
