= We Are Not Afraid =

1989 non fiction book

- First edition (publ. Macmillan)
- Author: Seth Cagin, Philip Dray
- Publication date: 1988
- Pages: 500
- ISBN: 9780553282696
- OCLC: 16645249

We Are Not Afraid: The Story of Goodman, Schwerner, and Chaney and the Civil Rights Campaign for Mississippi is a 1989 non-fiction book by Seth Cagin and Philip Dray. It concerns the murders of Michael Schwerner, Andrew Goodman, and James Chaney.

John Dittmer of DePauw University wrote that the book appeals both to general audiences and scholarly ones, with the work itself "somewhere between" the two. David W. Southern of Westminster College wrote that the book maintains historical accuracy while also going to "deftly recapture the climate of hatred, fear, ignorance, brutality, and poverty" seen in Mississippi Burning.

== Background ==
Both authors, both freelance journalists, had not been formally educated in history.

The research included court and Federal Bureau of Investigation (FBI) documents as well as narratives from journalists and interviews. The latter came from a former member of the Ku Klux Klan who perpetrated bombings, employees of the U.S. Justice Department and Federal Bureau of Investigation, including agents, and other former law enforcement officials. Some files were obtained under the Freedom of Information Act.

== Contents ==
The initial portion of the book discusses the victim's activities in the Philadelphia area and their murders, and the next part goes into the victims first joining the civil rights efforts. The book includes chapters about the lives of the victims and perpetrators. It also discusses the leadership and direction of Student Nonviolent Coordinating Committee (SNCC). The final chapter discusses the disappearances and deaths. The authors argue that if the Mississippi Freedom Democratic Party (MFDP) was seated in 1964, the SNCC may have had a different outcome.

Nicolaus Mills at Sarah Lawrence College stated that the biographical information is "never offered in isolation." Pamela Karlan of the NAACP wrote that the authors demonstrate "the consequences of a federal government with only a limited jurisdiction over and commitment to protecting basic human freedom in the south."

There were some historical errors in the volumes relating to content not directly about Goodman, Schwerner, and Chaney.

== Reception ==
Glen Jeansonne of the University of Wisconsin-Milwaukee wrote that "the book is a valuable account for students of U.S. contemporary history as well as a gripping human interest story." Jeansonne argued that at times the book was indecisive about its scope.

Dittmer argued that the authors did a good job talking about Cheney, Goodman, and Schwerner and the murders but erred in trying to give a broader historical background.

Naomi Bliven of The New Yorker described it as "suspenseful" in a manner "Like any good crime story" and that it portrays the "atmosphere" of anti-black sentiment among whites in the state. Bliven concluded that the book illustrates the "cost" of lives that had successfully fought for civil rights.

Anthony O. Edmonds of Ball State University wrote that the book is it is "exciting and inspiring" and "a fine work", citing that of the accounts of the crime it was the most "eloquently written", "accessible", and "exhaustively researched". He added that the book had "a tendency toward melodrama" and "obvious bias".
