= Dear Martin =

2016 young adult novel by Nic Stone

- First edition
- Author: Nic Stone
- Publisher: Crown Books for Young Readers
- Publication date: October 17, 2017
- Publication place: United States
- Pages: 224 (some pages are unnumbered due to them being "letters" to Dr. Martin Luther King Jr.)
- ISBN: 978-1101939499
- Followed by: Dear Justyce

Dear Martin, published in 2017 by Crown Publishing Group, is a young adult novel by Nic Stone. It is Stone's debut novel, written as a reaction to the murder of Jordan Davis. The book appeared as #4 on The New York Times Best Seller list.

== Development and publication ==
Stone began writing the book after a series of racially-charged events, including the 2012 murder of Jordan Davis, a 17-year-old who was killed by a man who shot several rounds into a car of teenagers over a dispute about loud rap music, and the 2014 shooting of Michael Brown. Stone was also inspired to write the book for her sons. Stone sold her book as a proposal, resulting in her writing and researching simultaneously over eight weeks to develop a draft. Stone described the experience as "excruciating" and stated that she was not interested in repeating it.

Dear Martin has been translated and published in Germany, Brazil, Indonesia, the Netherlands, the UK, Turkey, and Romania.

== Plot ==
Dear Martin follows Justyce McAllister, a high school student living in Atlanta and attending a predominantly white preparatory high school on a scholarship. Justyce is thrown to the ground and handcuffed by a white police officer. After the incident, Justyce attempts to make sense of life as a black teenager in the current political climate and begins writing letters to the spirit of Dr. Martin Luther King Jr., asking himself, "What would Dr. King do if he were alive today?".

== Reception ==
In February 2020, two years after it was first published, Dear Martin again hit the New York Times bestseller list, as the #1 Young Adult Paperback.

=== Accolades ===
- 2018 Finalist for the William C. Morris Debut YA Award
- 2018 American Library Association's (ALA) Top Ten Amazing Audiobooks for Young Adults
- 2018 ALA's Top Ten Quick Picks for Reluctant Young Adult Readers
- 2018 – Starred review from Booklist.
- 2018 Amelia Elizabeth Walden Award Nominee>
- 2020 South Carolina Book Award Nominee for Young Adult
- 2020 Lincoln Award Nominee

=== Controversy ===
Dear Martin has been banned or challenged in several school districts in Georgia, as well as in the Monett school district in Missouri.

== Sequel ==
Stone wrote a sequel, Dear Justyce, which was published in October 2020. The book is about an incarcerated teen, Quan, who is on trial for murder charges. Quan first appears in Dear Martin as the cousin of Justyce's best friend, and the story is told through letters written to Justyce. Stone was not planning on writing a sequel, but was encouraged by her publisher and decided to write a book about a "black boy that everybody is afraid of." Following the long-awaited sequel, a third book was published in March 2025. Dear Manny, the last installment of the Dear Martin series, is about Jared, one of Manny's friends. Jared explores new possibilities as he realizes his love for his debate opponent of color, while writing to his late friend, Manny.
