= Athol Dickson =

American writer and architect (born 1955)

- Born: 1955; Tulsa, Oklahoma, U.S.
- Occupation: Architect · Novelist · Writer
- Years active: c. 1996–present
- Notable work: Whom Shall I Fear? (1996); Every Hidden Thing (1998); They Shall See God (2002); River Rising (2006); The Opposite of Art (2011)
- Spouse: Sue Dickson
- Awards: Christy Award (2006, 2008, 2010); Audie Award (River Rising audio, 2008)

Athol Dickson (born 1955) is an American author and architect known for his Christian-themed novels and nonfiction works. His writing often includes themes of faith, spirituality, and moral complexities. Dickson won the Christy Award for best Christian fiction in 2006, 2008, and 2010.

== Early life ==
Athol Dickson was born in 1955 in Tulsa, Oklahoma, to a traveling salesman father and a homemaker mother. He grew up in Dallas, Texas. His paternal grandfather was a sharecropper and his maternal grandfather was an Oklahoma state judge.

== Career ==
Dickson worked as a salesman, boxer, carpenter, and bartender before becoming an architect and writer. As an architect, he designed numerous restaurants across the United States.

== Writing career ==
Dickson's debut novel, Whom Shall I Fear?, published in 1996, was a southern gothic murder mystery with spiritual undertones. Along with nine novels, Dickson has also written one non-fiction book that describes his five-year participation (as an evangelical Christian) in a synagogue Torah study group. In the book, Dickson describes how participation in the group changed his views of Judaism and his Christian faith.

=== Literary themes and style ===
Dickson's novels address religious belief, interfaith relationships, racism, and abortion.

=== Notable novels ===
- River Rising: The novel follows Hale Poser, an African American man raised in an orphanage, who investigates events in a Southern community. It was the 2006 winner of the Christy Award for best mystery-suspense novel. A Publishers Weekly review compared the novel to Octavia Butler's Kindred.
- The Opposite of Art: An allegorical mystery about Sheridan Ridler, an artist who experiences a spiritual awakening after an encounter he refers to as "the Glory."
- Lost Mission: This novel alternates between a seventeenth-century Spanish missionary and characters in modern Southern California. It won the 2010 Christy Award for suspense.

=== Reception ===
Dickson's novels have been described as "engrossing" and "entertaining." Publishers Weekly called River Rising "well-paced and powerfully imagined". Kirkus Reviews wrote that The Opposite of Art was "a novel of metaphysical and aesthetic mystery," and that "Dickson raises, but doesn’t answer, fascinating questions about personal transformation, religion and aesthetics." However, Jonathan Rickard in the New York Journal of Books criticized Dickson for his writing style and occasional factual errors.

== Personal life ==
Dickson is married to Sue Dickson, a former software executive, and lives in Florida.

== Books ==
=== Novels ===
- Whom Shall I Fear?. Zondervan. 1996. ISBN 978-0-310-20760-3.
- Every Hidden Thing. Zondervan. 1998. ISBN 978-0-310-22002-2.
- Kate and Ruth. Zondervan. 1999. ISBN 978-0-310-22005-3.
- They Shall See God. Tyndale. 2002. ISBN 978-0-8423-5292-5.
- River Rising. Minneapolis: Bethany House. 2005. ISBN 978-0-7642-0162-2.
- The Cure. Bethany House Publishers. 2007. ISBN 978-0-7642-0163-9.
- Winter Haven. Bethany House Publishers. 2008. ISBN 978-0-764-20164-6.
- Lost Mission. Howard Books. 2009. ISBN 978-1-416-58347-9.
- The Opposite of Art. Nashville: Howard Books. 2011. ISBN 978-1-4165-8348-6. OCLC 687669559.

=== Other ===
- The Gospel According to Moses: What My Jewish Friends Taught Me about Jesus. Brazos. 2003. ISBN 978-1-58743-048-0.
