= When Stars Are Scattered =

2020 nonfiction young adult graphic novel by Victoria Jamieson and Omar Mohamed

- Author: Victoria Jamieson and Omar Mohamed
- Audio read by: Faysal Ahmed, Barkhad Abdi, Victoria Jamieson, Omar Mohamed, Robin Miles, Bahni Turpin, Dominic Hoffman and others
- Illustrator: Victoria Jamieson and Iman Geddy
- Language: English
- Genre: Memoir, Graphic novel
- Publisher: Dial Press
- Publication date: April 14, 2020
- Media type: Hardcover, paperback, audiobook
- Pages: 264
- ISBN: 9780525553908

When Stars Are Scattered is a nonfiction young adult graphic novel written by Victoria Jamieson and Omar Mohamed, illustrated by Victoria Jamieson and Iman Geddy, and published April 14, 2020, by Dial Books. Alongside other honors, the book won the Walter Dean Myers Award for Young Readers and Bank Street Children's Book Committee's Josette Frank Award.

== Premise ==
Now apparently orphaned, Omar and his younger brother Hassan, have relocated to a refugee camp in Kenya, where an older woman adopts them, but they face difficult conditions. Omar faces the dilemma of whether to attend school, which would entail leaving his brother.

== Reception ==
=== Reviews ===
When Stars Are Scattered was well-received, including starred reviews from Booklist, The Horn Book, Kirkus Reviews, Publishers Weekly, and School Library Journal.

Writing for School Library Journal, Steven Engelfried said, "The writing is intriguing and easy to understand. The graphics are beautiful and really bring the characters to the page. Omar’s story is important, relevant, and relatable."

Kirkus Reviews wrote, "This engaging, heartwarming story does everything one can ask of a book, and then some."

The audiobook, which has 12 narrators, received a starred review from Booklist, who said, the audiobook "offers listeners an experience of perfection in its storytelling, format shifting, and performance."

When Stars Are Scattered was named one of the best books of 2020 by the Chicago Public Library, Kirkus Reviews, the New York Public Library, The New York Times, NPR, Publishers Weekly, and School Library Journal.

=== Awards and honors ===
Both the book and audiobook editions of When Stars Are Scattered are Junior Library Guild selections.

Awards and honors for When Stars Are Scattered
Year	Award/honor	Result	Ref.
2020	Booklist Editors' Choice: Youth Audio	Selection	
2020	Charlotte Huck Award	Honor	
2020	Goodreads Choice Award for Graphic Novels & Comics	Nominee	
2020	Jane Addams Children's Book Award	Finalist	
2020	National Book Award for Young People's Literature	Finalist	
2021	ALSC Notable Children's Books for Middle Readers	Selection	
2021	ALSC Notable Children's Recordings	Selection	
2021	Children's Africana Book Award for Older Readers	Honor	
2021	Eisner Award for Best Publication for Teens	Nominee	
2021	Heavy Medal Award	Finalist	
2021	ILA Notable Books for a Global Society	Selection	
2021	Josette Frank Award	Winner	
2021	Judy Lopez Memorial Award	Honor	
2021	Odyssey Award for Excellence in Audiobook Production	Honor	
2021	Schneider Family Book Award	Honor	
2021	Walter Dean Myers Award for Younger Readers	Winner	
2021	YALSA Amazing Audiobooks for Young Adults	Top 10	
2021	YALSA Award for Excellence in Nonfiction	Nominee	
2021	YALSA Great Graphic Novels for Teens	Selection	
2021	YALSA Quick Picks for Reluctant Young Adult Readers	Selection	
