= Kekla Magoon =

American author (born 1980)

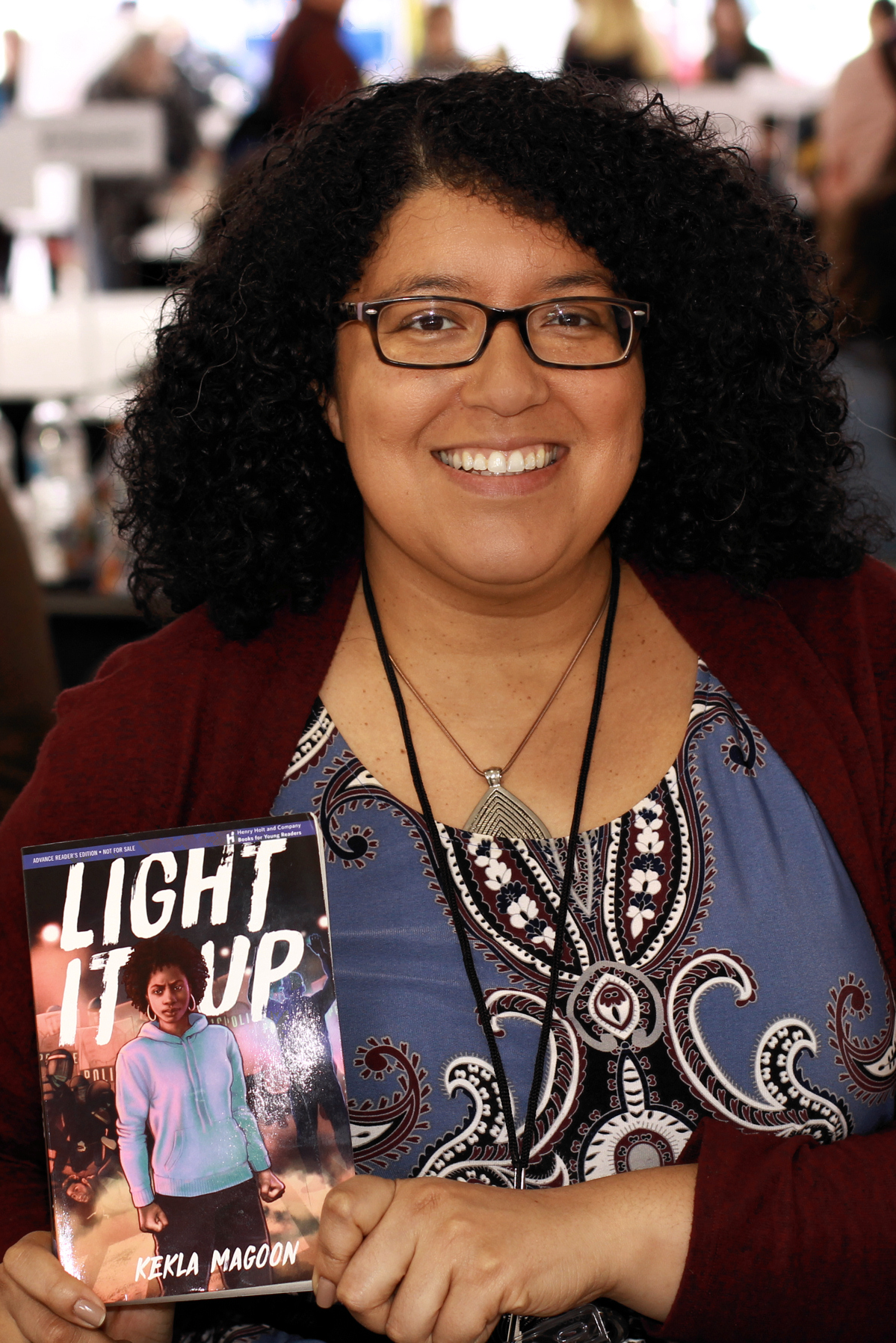
- Magoon at the 2019 Texas Book Festival
- Born: 1980 (age 45–46); Michigan, U.S.
- Education: Vermont College of Fine Arts (MA); Northwestern University (BA)
- Writing career
- Language: English
- Years active: 1999–present
- Genres: Young adult fiction, middle grade fiction, short stories, non-fiction
- Notable works: How It Went Down; X The Rock and the River; The Season of Styx Malone
- Notable awards: Walter Dean Myers Award (2016); Margaret A. Edwards Award (2021)
- Website: keklamagoon.com//

Kekla Magoon (born 1980) is an American author, best known for her NAACP Image Award-nominated young adult novel The Rock and the River, How It Went Down, The Season of Styx Malone, and X. In 2021, she received the Margaret Edwards Award from the American Library Association for her body of work. Her works also include middle grade novels, short stories, and historical, socio-political, and economy-related non-fiction.

== Personal life ==
Magoon was born in Michigan and grew up in Fort Wayne, Indiana. She is the biracial daughter of a white American mother with Dutch and Scottish ancestry and a black Cameroonian father. As a child, she spent a few years living in Cameroon.

Prior to becoming a writer, she worked for non-profit organizations in New York City. She graduated with a bachelor's degree from Northwestern University, where she majored in History, with a concentration on Africa and the Middle East. Magoon has a master of fine arts degree in Writing from Vermont College of Fine Arts, which she was able to study via a low-residency program for children's writers. In 2015, she taught writing in New York City and served as a judge for School Library Journal. In 2017, she was faculty at the Highlights Foundation, a non-profit organization in Honesdale, Pennsylvania, where she taught a workshop about developing new creative strategies through meditation sessions, workshop elements, and discussion, together with authors Laurie Calkhoven and Nicole Valentine.

She is a member of the NWP Writers Council.

Magoon lives in Vermont and teaches writing at the Vermont College of Fine Arts.

== Selected works ==
Magoon says that all her novels deal with how ordinary kids can make a difference in the world.

Her debut novel, The Rock and the River, set in 1968 Chicago and follows the story of the 13-year-old son of a civil rights activist and follower of Martin Luther King Jr., who has to deal with his brother joining the Black Panther Party. It discusses issues of class, race, and poverty. Magoon says she spent time deliberately researching the non-violent civil rights movement, has always had an interest in history, and majored in History in college. She initially had the idea to write the novel between her first semester at Northwestern University and revised the first draft during her second and third semester, before submitting The Rock and the River as her thesis.

She wrote her fourth young adult novel, How It Went Down, about the aftermath of the shooting of a black teenager, in response to the shooting of Trayvon Martin and Michael Brown. Frustrated by the media coverage's bias, she decided to write a fictionalized story that explored what it would be like to be personally affected through a close family member or friend being killed.

Magoon's sixth young adult novel X is a fictionalized account of civil rights activist Malcolm X's formative years and co-authored with his daughter, Ilyasah Shabazz. Shabazz says her agent chose Magoon as a co-writer based on the quality of her previous work and the themes she tackled in her novels.

Her seventh Middle Grade novel, The Season of Styx Malone, about three African American boys living in a small town in Indiana, United States, who swap their little sister for fireworks, was published by Wendy Lamb books in 2018. Magoon says that she loosely based the novel on a real event from her childhood, when an ice cream parlor clerk in North Carolina told them about how his father and uncle once tried to trade their baby sister.

In July 2019 it was announced that Magoon would be publishing a non-fiction young adult novel about the legacy of the Black Panthers, called Until All Are Free: The Black Panther Party's Call for Revolution and slated for a tentative publication date with Candlewick in 2021.

== Critical reception ==
Magoon's novels have earned starred reviews from multiple literary magazines.

Her novels Light It Up, The Season of Styx Malone, X, and Ibi Zoboi's anthology Black Enough that she contributed a short story for, and How It Went Down have received starred reviews from Publishers Weekly. They also chose How It Went Down as a Publishers Weekly Pick.

Kirkus Reviews awarded her debut novel Camo Girl How it Went Down, Marc Aronson and Susan Campbell Bartoletti's 1968: Today's Authors Explore a Year of Rebellion, Revolution, and Change, and The Season of Styx Malone a starred review, calling the latter "Heartening and hopeful, a love letter to black male youth grasping the desires within them, absorbing the worlds around them, striving to be more otherwise than ordinary."

School Library Journal gave starred reviews to Rebellion of Thieves, Jessica Spotswood's anthology A Tyranny of Petticoats: 15 Stories of Belles, Bank Robbers and Other Badass Girls, and The Season of Styx Malone. The Season of Styx Malone was especially praised by critics, also earning a starred review from Shelf Awareness and The Horn Book, and being named one of the best books of 2018 by Kirkus Reviews.

X, co-authored with Ilyasah Shabazz, was one of five novels in 2015 to receive six starred reviews.

== Bibliography ==
Middle Grade

- Camo Girl (Aladdin, 2011)
- Robyn Hoodlum Series
  1. Shadows of Sherwood (Bloomsbury USA Children's, 2015)
  2. Rebellion of Thieves (Bloomsbury USA Children's, 2016)
  3. Reign of Outlaws (Bloomsbury USA Children's, 2017)
- Infinity Riders (Random House Books for Young Readers, 2016)
- The Season of Styx Malone (Wendy Lamb Books, 2018)

Young Adult

- The Rock and the River Series
  1. The Rock and the River (Aladdin, 2009)
  2. Fire in the Streets (Aladdin, 2012)
- 37 Things I Love (in No Particular Order) (Henry Holt, 2012)
- How It Went Down (Henry Holt, 2014)
- X, co-authored with Ilyasah Shabazz (Candlewick Press, 2015)
- Light It Up (Henry Holt, 2019)

Short Stories

- "For a Moment, Underground" in Things I'll Never Say: Stories About Our Secret Selves, edited by Ann Angel (Candlewick Press, 2016)
- "Pulse of the Panthers" in A Tyranny of Petticoats: 15 Stories of Belles, Bank Robbers and Other Badass Girls, edited by Jessica Spotswood (Candlewick Press, 2016)
- "Makeshift" in I See Reality: Twelve Short Stories About Real Life, edited by Grace Kendall (Farrar, Straus & Giroux, 2016)
- Dear Heartbreak: YA Authors and Teens on the Dark Side of Love. edited by Heather Demetrios (Henry Holt, 2018)
- "Out of the Silence" in Black Enough: Stories of Being Young & Black in America, edited by Ibi Zoboi (Balzer + Bray, 2019)

Non-fiction

- For the Essential Viewpoints Series
  - Gun Control (Abdo Publishing Company, 2007)
  - The Welfare Debate (Essential Library, 2008)
  - Sex Education in Schools (Essential Library, 2009)
  - Media Censorship (Essential Library, 2009)
- For the Essential Events Series
  - The Salem Witch Trials (Abdo Publishing Company, 2008)
  - The Zebulon Pike Expedition (Abdo Publishing Company, 2009)
- For the Essential Lives Series
  - Abraham Lincoln (Abdo Publishing Company, 2007)
  - Nelson Mandela: A Leader for Freedom (Abdo Publishing Company, 2008)
  - Cesar Chavez: Crusader for Labor Rights (Essential Library, 2010)
- Today the World Is Watching You: The Little Rock Nine and the Fight for School Integration, 1957 (Twenty-First Century Books, 2011)
- in 1968: Today’s Authors Explore a Year of Rebellion, Revolution, and Change (Candlewick Press, 2018)

== Awards and accolades ==
Year	Work	Award	Result	Ref.
2010	The Rock and the River	Association for Library Service to Children's Notable Children's Books for Older Readers	Selection	
2010	The Rock and the River	John Steptoe New Talent Award	Winner	
2010	The Rock and the River	NAACP Image Award in Outstanding Literary Work - Youth/Teens	Nominee	
2010	The Rock and the River	YALSA's Best Books for Young Adults	Selection	
2011	The Rock and the River	Audie Award for Young Adult Title	Winner	
2011	The Rock and the River	YALSA's Amazing Audiobooks for Young Adults	Top 10	
2012	The Rock and the River	Booklist Editors' Choice: Books for Youth	Selection	
2012	The Rock and the River	Rebecca Caudill Young Readers' Book Award	Nominee	
2015	X: A Novel	Booklist's Best Historical Fiction for Youth	Top 10	
2015	X: A Novel	Booklist's Best Multicultural Fiction for Youth	Top 10	
2015	X: A Novel	Booklist Editors' Choice: Books for Youth	Top 10	
2015	X: A Novel	Coretta Scott King Award for Author	Honor	
2015	X: A Novel	National Book Award for Young People's Literature	Longlist	
2016	X: A Novel	Cooperative Children's Book Center Choices 2016	Selection	
2016	X: A Novel	Coretta Scott King Award for Author	Honor	
2016	X: A Novel	NAACP Image Award for Outstanding Literary Work - Children	Winner	
2016	X: A Novel	Walter Dean Myers	Honor	
2016	X: A Novel	YALSA's Best Fiction for Young Adults	Top 10	
2017	How It Went Down	Magnolia Award for 9-12	Nominee	
2017	Shadows of Sherwood	Dorothy Canfield Fisher Children's Book Award	Nominee	
2018	X: A Novel	Rhode Island Teen Book Award	Nominee	
2019	The Season of Styx Malone	Coretta Scott King Award for Author	Honor	
2019	The Season of Styx Malone	Boston Globe–Horn Book Award, Fiction and Poetry Award	Winner	
2021	Revolution in Our Time: The Black Panther Party's Promise to the People	National Book Award for Young People's Literature	Nominee	
2021		Margaret Edwards Award	Winner	
2022	Revolution in Our Time: The Black Panther Party's Promise to the People	Walter Dean Myers Award	Honor	
