= Box: Henry Brown Mails Himself to Freedom =

2020 children's biography of Henry Box Brown

- Author: Carole Boston Weatherford
- Illustrator: Michele Wood
- Language: English
- Genre: Children's literature / Slavery /
- Publisher: Candlewick Press
- Publication date: 2020
- Publication place: United States

Box: Henry Brown Mails Himself to Freedom is a 2020 children's retelling of Henry Box Brown's 1849 escape from slavery by mailing himself from Richmond, Virginia, to Philadelphia, Pennsylvania. Written by poet Carole Boston Weatherford and illustrated by Michele Wood, the story is told using 51 individually-titled poems of six-line free verse, six representing the sides of a box, and it is supplemented with writings from Brown's autobiography Narrative of the Life of Henry Box Brown. The book earned a Newbery honor in 2021.

== Summary ==
Henry recounts his life as a child slave, growing up on his master's plantation in Louisa County, Virginia with his mother and seven siblings. Born in 1815 or 1816, he spent his childhood as a house slave until he was put to work on his master's plantation. Henry recalls his and his brother's monthly 20-mile trek carrying grain to be milled.

His master dies in 1830, and his family is separated, his master's sons each taking different slaves. Henry's new master lives in Richmond, and Henry is forced to work in his master's tobacco factory. In Richmond, Henry observes the slavepens, whipping posts, and auction houses where slaves are sold.

In 1831, many slaves were killed after Nat Turner's failed rebellion. Whites' fear of a slave uprising is contrasted with the constant fear slaves endure daily, from the lash, family separation, being sent further south, or never being freed. Blacks must carry slave passes; freed slaves are forced out of Virginia, otherwise they are re-enslaved after one year; blacks are restricted from gathering in groups of more than five, are barred from worshiping without a white preacher present, and learning to read or write is illegal.

Henry meets Nancy, a washerwoman, and marries her after receiving permission from her master, Mr. Leigh. After Nancy is resold many times, Mr. Colquitt purchases her and agrees to keep the Brown family together as long as Henry pays him, houses, and feeds the family; Henry agrees. A year later, Colquitt reneges, and Nancy and the pair's three children are sold and end up imprisoned in a slave pen called Devil's Half Acre. Henry attempts to visit his family but hears from a young man that he is at risk of being imprisoned himself after his master lied to the jailer. He holds his wife's hand one last time as his family is led away in chains to North Carolina.

What have I to fear?
My master broke every promise to me.
I lost my beloved wife and our dear children.
All sold south. Neither my time nor my body is mine.
The breath of life is all I have to lose.
And bondage is suffocating me.

— COURAGE

Henry devises a plan in the spring of 1849 to escape slavery by shipping himself north, paying his entire life savings, $166 (equivalent to ~$6,200 in 2025), for a carpenter to build a box big enough to fit him, reasoning he has nothing left to lose.

Needing someone to close the box's lid and keep it upright while in transit, Henry recruits a white shoemaker named Samuel Smith as an accomplice. Smith also helps coordinate the receipt of the box in Philadelphia by abolitionist James Miller McKim. To avoid arousing suspicion for going missing, Henry burns himself with acid to get out of work for several days.

Smith and James Smith, a freedman, arrange for the box to be shipped by Adams Express. At Potomac Creek, the box is knocked over, and two travelers question what's inside. In Washington, D.C., Henry passes out from pain after the box is shoved out of a wagon. At the train station, two men debate whether there will be room for the box or if it will have to wait until tomorrow to ship. One man points out that the box has been shipped express and can't wait. After twenty-seven hours boxed up, Henry finally arrives in Philadelphia. The lid is opened, and he exits a free man.

Henry begins touring, telling his story at anti-slavery events, and promoting his book, The Narrative of the Life of Henry Box Brown. Despite his freedom, his mind returns to his family and how to locate them. To expose others to the horror of slavery, Henry partners with an artist in Boston, and the two create a moving panorama called Henry Box Brown's Mirror of Slavery, and tour New England with it.

After the passage of the Fugitive Slave Act, Henry emigrated to England. In 1854, he hears of Anthony Burns, who was also jailed at Devil's Half Acre. Henry reinvents himself as an African prince showman, "The King of all Mesmerisers", and remarries, starting a new family with a baby daughter, and returns to the United States.
