= Zainab Jah =

British-African actress

- Born: London, UK
- Occupation: Actress
- Years active: 2000–present

Zainab Jah is a British award-winning theater, television and film actress of Sierra Leonean descent. She is mostly known for her theater performances as Maima (Wife Number Two) in Danai Gurira's Broadway play Eclipsed, Venus, and School Girls, among others.

She has also worked in film and television. She plays anti-corruption minister Aminata Sissoko in the second season of Deep State, and Aby Bah in Homeland. She has also appeared on Blindspot and Law & Order: Special Victims Unit.

== Filmography ==
=== Film ===
Year	Title	Role	Notes
2000	Dinner Rush	Adrian	
2006	Naptime	Singer	Short film
2007	The Summoning of Everyman	Confession	
2008	How to Make Afang Soup	Mama	Short film
2015	Emily & Tim	Helayne Specter	
2016	New York, I Love You	Sophie	Short film
2016	Buried	Zainab	Short film
2019	Jazz in Wakanda	Zainab	Short film
2020	Farewell Amor	Esther	
2021	False Positive	Grace Singleton	
2021	Out/Side Of Time		Short film
2021	The Black Disquisition	Sedalia/Mom	Short film
2022	Sherman	Sherman	Short film
2022	Launch at Paradise	Elsa	Short film
2022	Black Panther: Wakanda Forever	Mining Tribe Elder	
2023	Drift	Etweda Kamara	
2023	All Dirt Roads Taste of Salt	Older Mack	

=== Television ===
Year	Title	Role	Notes
2001	100 Centre Street		Episode: "Lost Causes"
2005	Law & Order: Special Victims Unit	Homeless Person	Episode: "Goliath"
2016–17	Homeland	Aby Bah	Recurring role; 4 episodes
2017	Elementary	Female Crematory Worker	Episode: "High Heat"
2018	Blindspot	President Botros	Episode: "Defection"
2018	Instinct	Rebreau	Episode: "Bye Bye Birdie"
2019	Deep State	Aminata Sissoko	Season 2 regular; 7 episodes
2020	The Good Lord Bird	Harriet Tubman	Episode: "Smells Like Bear"
2021	Only Murders in the Building	Ndidi Idoko	Recurring role; 4 episodes
2023	East New York	Adama Gueye	Episode: "We Didn't Start the Fire"
2023	The Blacklist	Aissa Joachim	Episode: "Dr. Michael Abani (No. 198)"
2023	The Continental	Mazie	Mini-series; 2 episodes

== Theatre ==
Year	Title	Role	Notes
2005	Medea	Death	
2006	King Lear	Regan	
2007	(The Blood) Electra	Electra	
2008	Trojan Women	Helen	
2009	Eclipsed	Maima (Wife #2)	
2015	Eclipsed	Maima (Wife #2)	
2015	Hamlet	Hamlet	Wilma Theatre, Philadelphia, March-May 2015
2016	Stuffed	Katey	
2017	Venus	Sarah Baartman	
2017	School Girls; Or, The African Mean Girls Play	Eloise Amponsah	
2019	Boesman and Lena	Venus	

== Awards ==
Awards and nominations
Year	Award	Category	Work	Result	Ref
2016	Obie Award	Obie Award for Performance	Eclipsed	Won	
2016	Outer Critics Circle Award	Outstanding Featured Actress in a Play	Eclipsed	Nominated	
2017	Audie Award	Audie Award for Young Listeners	28 Days: Moments in Black History That Changed the World	Won	
2018	Drama Desk Award	Drama Desk Ensemble Award	School Girls; Or, The African Mean Girls Play	Won	
2019	Drama League Award	Distinguished Performance	Boesman and Lena	Nominated	
2019	Drama Desk Award	Outstanding Actress in a Play	Boesman and Lena	Nominated	
2019	Lucille Lortel Awards	Outstanding Lead Actress in a Play	Boesman and Lena	Nominated	
2021	FESPACO Award	Best Actress	Farewell Amor	Won	
