= DéLana R. A. Dameron =

American writer and poet (1985–2025)

- Born: January 30, 1985 Anderson, South Carolina, U.S.
- Died: November 29, 2025 (aged 40) Columbia, South Carolina, U.S.
- Education: Spring Valley High School; University of North Carolina (BA, 2007); New York University (MA)
- Spouse: Curtis John

DéLana R. A. Dameron (January 30, 1985 – November 29, 2025) was an American writer and poet. She authored two books of poetry, How God Ends Us (2009) and Weary Kingdom (2017), as well as one prose collection, Redwood Court (2024). How God Ends Us won the South Carolina Poetry Book Prize.

== Biography ==
Dameron was born in Anderson, South Carolina on January 30, 1985, to Thomas and Rena (née Melvin) Dameron, and grew up in Columbia, South Carolina. She had a sister. Dameron graduated from Spring Valley High School, then received a Bachelor of Arts in history from the University of North Carolina in 2007, followed by a Master of Arts in poetry from New York University.

In 2018, Dameron was the Poet-in-Residence at the University of Mississippi. After living in New York for 13 years, she returned to Columbia in 2019, buying a farm called Saloma Acres in 2021.

Dameron published her debut poetry collection, Weary Kingdom, the University of South Carolina Press in 1997. The book includes a foreword by American poet Ross Gay. It was republished in 2017. In 2009, she published her second book with the University of Carolina Press, How God Ends Us, which includes a foreword by American poet Elizabeth Alexander. It received the South Carolina Book Prize, and was a finalist for Foreword Review's Book of the Year. Dameron's first book of prose, Redwood Court, was published with The Dial Press in 2024.

Dameron was married to Curtis John. She died from kidney and heart problems on November 29, 2025, at the age of 40.

== Books ==
- Weary Kingdom. Foreword by Ross Gay. University of South Carolina Press. 1997. ISBN 978-1-611-17810-4.
- How God Ends Us. Foreword by Elizabeth Alexander. University of South Carolina Press. 2009. ISBN 978-1-570-03832-7.
- Redwood Court. Dial Press. 2024. ISBN 978-0-593-44702-4.
