= Philip Dray =

American writer and historian

Philip Dray is an American writer and historian, known for his comprehensive analyses of American scientific, racial, and labor history.

== Awards ==
Dray's work At the Hands of Persons Unknown: The Lynching of Black America (by Random House Publishing Group) won the Robert F. Kennedy Book Award. He was a finalist in 2003 for a Pulitzer Prize in history.

== Books ==
- A Lynching at Port Jervis: Race and Reckoning in the Gilded Age. Farrar, Straus and Giroux, 2022. ISBN 978-0-374-19441-3
- There Is Power in a Union: The Epic Story of Labor in America. Doubleday, 2010. ISBN 978-0-385-52629-6
- Capitol Men: The Epic Story of Reconstruction Through the Lives of the First Black Congressmen. Mariner Books, 2010. ISBN 978-0-547-24797-7
- Stealing God's Thunder: Benjamin Franklin's Lightning Rod and the Invention of America. Random House, 2005. ISBN 978-0-8129-6810-1
- At the Hands of Persons Unknown: The Lynching of Black America. Modern Library, 2003. ISBN 978-0-375-75445-6
- We Are Not Afraid: The Story of Goodman, Schwerner, and Chaney and the Civil Rights Campaign for Mississippi. Macmillan, 1989. ISBN 978-0-02-520260-3

=== Children's books ===
- Philip Dray. Yours for Justice, Ida B. Wells: The Daring Life of a Crusading Journalist. Illustrated by Stephen Alcorn. Peachtree, 2008. ISBN 978-1-56145-417-4
