= Lizan Mitchell =

American actress

- Occupation: Actress
- Years active: 1993–present

Lizan Mitchell is a film, Broadway, and television actress known for her roles in the films The Preacher's Wife and The Human Stain. She has also played television roles such as Clara in Unbreakable Kimmy Schmidt and Guiding Light.

== Early years ==
Mitchell was raised in the Bluford, Dudley Heights, and Warnersville communities of Greensboro, North Carolina. She attended Our Lady of the Miraculous Medal Elementary School, Notre Dame Catholic High School, and North Carolina A&T State University. From an early age, she felt that she was a performer. Her first acting role was portrayal of a witch in a children's play at Bennett College when she was 7 years old.

Although Mitchell's high school was integrated, she felt the effects of racism when plays were produced there. She said, "There were no roles for black students. You were either a slave or you sang (in the chorus) or you could be a servant. We realized it wasn't fair." During her high school years, she and other Black young people were arrested for protesting segregation practices in the community.

== Career ==
On film, she was seen in Brother to Brother (2004) and The Final Patient (2005).

== Awards ==
She received the Helen Hayes Award for Outstanding Lead Actress, Non-Resident Production.

== Filmography ==
=== Film ===
Year	Film	Role	Notes
1996	The Preacher's Wife	Judge	
2003	The Human Stain	Ernestine	
2004	Brother to Brother	Protesting Woman	
2005	The Final Patient	Elizabeth Green	

=== Television ===
Year	Title	Role	Notes
1992–2001	Law & Order	Dorothy Meredith / Judge Lerner	2 episodes
1999–2000	Guiding Light	Judge Taylor	
2002	The Wire	Shooting Witness	
2008	John Adams	Sally Hemmings	TV mini series
2010	Law & Order: Criminal Intent	Housekeeper	Episode: "Traffic"
2010	The Good Wife	Judith's Mother	
2016–2017	Unbreakable Kimmy Schmidt	Clara / Great Aunt	2 episodes
