= X (young adult novel) =

2015 novel by Ilyasah Shabazz and Kekla Magoon

X: A Novel
- Author: Ilyasah Shabazz and Kekla Magoon
- Language: English
- Genre: Young adult, Historical fiction
- Publisher: Candlewick Press
- Publication date: September 3, 2020
- Publication place: United States
- English publication date: August 2, 2016
- Media type: Print
- ISBN: 9780763690922

X: A Novel is a young adult novel by Ilyasah Shabazz and Kekla Magoon, published January 6, 2015 by Candlewick Press.

== Reception ==
X is a Junior Library Guild selection.

The book received starred review from Publishers Weekly, Kirkus Reviews, Booklist, Shelf Awareness, The Horn Book, and School Library Journal, as well as positive reviews from The New York Times Book Review, HuffPost, and Bulletin of the Center for Children's Books.

The Horn Book, School Library Journal, and Publishers Weekly named X one of the best books of the 2015.

Awards and accolades for X
Year	Award / Accolade	Result	Ref.
2015	Booklist's Best Historical Fiction for Youth	Top 10	
2015	Booklist's Best Multicultural Fiction for Youth	Top 10	
2015	Booklist Editors' Choice: Books for Youth	Top 10	
2015	National Book Award for Young People's Literature	Longlist	
2016	Cooperative Children's Book Center Choices 2016	Selection	
2016	Coretta Scott King Award for Author	Honor	
2016	NAACP Image Award for Outstanding Literary Work - Children	Winner	
2016	Walter Dean Myers	Honor	
2016	YALSA's Best Fiction for Young Adults	Top 10	
2018	Rhode Island Teen Book Award	Nominee	
