= Victoria Jamieson =

American author and illustrator

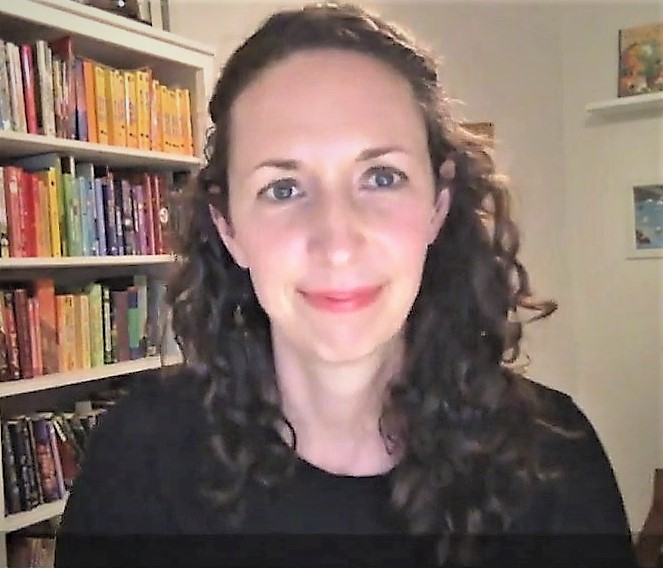
- Jamieson reads for the National Book Foundation in 2020
- Occupations: Author and illustrator
- Writing career
- Genres: children's books, graphic novels
- Notable works: When Stars Are Scattered; Roller Girl
- Website: victoriajamieson.com

Victoria Jamieson is an American author and illustrator of children's books, known for her graphic novels.

Her most decorated book is When Stars Are Scattered co-authored with Omar Mohamed and published in 2019. It is a semi-autobiographical account of Mohamed's time with his brother as Somali refugees at a camp in Kenya. It was shortlisted for the 2020 National Book Award for Young People's Literature and was a 2022 Bank Street Children's Book Committee's Best Book of the Year with an "outstanding merit" distinction and winner of the Committee's Josette Frank Award for fiction.

Other notable books include Roller Girl (2015), a graphic novel about middle school and roller derby, which was a 2016 Newbery Honor winner and named a 2016 Bank Street Children's Book Committee's Best Book of the Year. Another middle school graphic novel, All's Faire in Middle School (2017), was named to the 2018 Bank Street Children's Best Books of the Year List with an “Outstanding Merit.”

== Bibliography ==
- Olympig! (2012)
- Pest in Show (2013)
- Roller Girl (2015)
- Pets on the Loose! The Great Pet Escape (2016)
- Pets on the Loose! The Great Art Caper (2017)
- All's Faire in Middle School (2017)
- When Stars Are Scattered, co-authored with Omar Mohamed (2020)
