= 2019 Youth Media Awards =

The 2019 Youth Media Awards were held by the American Library Association on January 28, 2019. The awards recognize books written for children and young adults and the authors and illustrators who create them.

== May Hill Arbuthnot Honor Lecture ==
The Arbuthnot Lecture recognizes an author, critic, librarian, historian, or teacher of children's literature. The 2020 lecturer is Neil Gaiman whose work creating modern comics and as a proponent of intellectual freedom was cited.

== Alex Awards ==
The Alex Awards are given to books written for adults which have appeal to teenagers.

2019 Recipients
| Book | Author | Publisher |
|---|---|---|
| The Black God's Drums | P. Djèlí Clark | Tor Books |
| The Book of Essie | Meghan MacLean Weir | Knopf |
| Circe | Madeline Miller | Little, Brown and Company |
| Educated: A Memoir | Tara Westover | Random House |
| The Girl Who Smiled Beads: A Story of War and What Comes After | Clemantine Wamariya and Elizabeth Weil | Crown Publishing Group |
| Green | Sam Graham-Felsen | Random House |
| Home After Dark | David Small | Liveright & Company |
| How Long 'til Black Future Month? | N. K. Jemisin | Orbit Publications |
| Lawn Boy | Jonathan Evison | Algonquin Books |
| Spinning Silver | Naomi Novik | Del Rey Books |

== American Indian Youth Literature Award ==
This award, given biannually in even years, will be announced as part of the Youth Media Awards for the first time in 2020.

== Asian/Pacific American Award for Literature ==
This award promotes Asian/Pacific American culture in books. The picture book winner was Drawn Together by Minh Lê and illustrated by Dan Santat, the children's literature winner was Front Desk by Kelly Yang, and the Young Adult literature winner was Darius the Great Is Not Okay.

== Mildred L. Batchelder Award ==
The Mildred L. Batchelder Award is given to children's books published in a language other than English and then translated into English for publication in the United States.

2019 Batchelder Award awardees
| Awarded Publisher | Title | Author | Translator | Language | Recognition |
|---|---|---|---|---|---|
| Thames & Hudson | The Fox on the Swing | Evelina Daciūtė | Translation Bureau | Lithuanian | Winner |
| Yonder | Run for Your Life | Silvana Gandolfi | Lynne Sharon Schwartz | Italian | Honoree |
| Graphic Universe | My Beijing: Four Stories of Everyday Wonder | Nie Jun | Edward Gauvin | French (Note: The book was originally published in Mandarin, and was translated into French. The French translation was the basis for the English translation.) | Honoree |
| Enchanted Lion Books | Jerome by Heart | Thomas Scotto | Claudia Zoe Bedrick and Karin Snelson | French | Honoree |

== Pura Belpré Awards ==
The Pura Belpré Award is given to Latinx writers and illustrators of children's books.

2019 Pura Belpré Medal winners and honors
| Work | Recipient | Title | Citation |
|---|---|---|---|
| author | Elizabeth Acevedo | The Poet X | Winner |
| author | David Bowles | They Call Me Güero | Honor |
| illustrator | Yuyi Morales | Dreamers / Soñadores | Winner |
| illustrator | José Ramírez | When Angels Sing | Honor |
| illustrator | Leo Espinosa | Island Born | Honor |

== Caldecott Medal ==
The Caldecott Medal is given to the most distinguished American picture book

Caldecott Medal winners and honors
| Illustrator | Title | Award |
|---|---|---|
| Sophie Blackall | Hello Lighthouse | Winner |
| Juana Martinez-Neal | Alma and How She Got Her Name | Honor |
| Grace Lin | A Big Mooncake for Little Star | Honor |
| Brian Lies | The Rough Patch | Honor |
| Oge Mora | Thank You, Omu! | Honor |

== Children's Literature Legacy Award ==
The Children's Literature Legacy Award is given as a lifetime achievement award to an author or illustrator of children's books. The award was given for the first time under this name after being renamed from the Laura Ingalls Wilder Award. Walter Dean Myers was given the award, with Somewhere in the Darkness and Monster specifically cited.

== Coretta Scott King Book Awards ==
The Coretta Scott King Awards are given to African American authors and illustrators that "demonstrate an appreciation of African American culture and universal human values."

2019 Coretta Scott King Award Recipients
| Award Type | Recipient | Title | Citation |
|---|---|---|---|
| author | Claire Hartfield | A Few Red Drops: The Chicago Race Riot of 1919 | Winner |
| author | Liesa Cline-Ransome | Finding Langston | Honor |
| author | Varian Johnson | The Parker Inheritance | Honor |
| author | Kekla Magoon | The Season of Styx Malone | Honor |
| illustrator | Ekua Holmes | The Stuff of Stars | Winner |
| illustrator | Laura Freeman | Hidden Figures: The True Story of Four Black Women and the Space Race | Honor |
| illustrator | Frank Morrison | Let the Children March | Honor |
| illustrator | R. Gregory Christie | Memphis, Martin, and the Mountaintop | Honor |
| John Steptoe New Talent Author Award | Tiffany D. Jackson | Monday's Not Coming | Winner |
| John Steptoe New Talent Illustrator Award | Oge Mora | Thank You, Omu! | Winner |
| Virginia Hamilton Lifetime Achievement | Pauletta Brown Bracy | | Winner |

== Margaret Edwards Award ==
The Margaret Edwards Award is a lifetime achievement award for young adult writers. The 2019 recipient was M. T. Anderson, who was cited for his work on Feed, The Astonishing Life of Octavian Nothing, Traitor to the Nation, Volume I: The Pox Party and The Astonishing Life of Octavian Nothing, Traitor to the Nation, Volume II: The Kingdom on the Waves.

== Geisel Award ==
The Geisel Award recognizes beginner reader books.

Geisel Award Winners and Honors
| Author | Illustrator | Title | Citation |
|---|---|---|---|
| Corey Tabor | Corey Tabor | Fox the Tiger | Winner |
| David Milgrim | David Milgrim | The Adventures of Otto: See Pip Flap | Honor |
| Dori Hillestad Butler | Nancy Meyers | King & Kayla and the Case of the Lost Tooth | Honor |
| Sergio Ruzzier | Sergio Ruzzier | Fox + Chick: The Party and Other Stories | Honor |
| Emily Tetri | Emily Tetri | Tiger vs. Nightmare | Honor |

== William C. Morris Award ==
The William C. Morris Award is given to a first-time teen author.

Morris Award winners and finalists
| Author | Book | Citation |
|---|---|---|
| Adib Khorram | Darius the Great Is Not Okay | Winner |
| Joy McCullough | Blood Water Paint | Finalist |
| Ngozi Ukazu | Check, Please!: #Hockey | Finalist |
| Tomi Adeyemi | Children of Blood and Bone | Finalist |
| Vesper Stamper | What the Night Sings | Finalist |

== Newbery Medal ==
The Newbery Medal is given to the most outstanding contribution to children's literature.

Winners and Honor Books
| Author | Book | Award |
|---|---|---|
| Meg Medina | Merci Suárez Changes Gears | Winner |
| Veera Hiranandani | The Night Diary | Honor |
| Catherine Gilbert Murdock | The Book of Boy | Honor |

== Excellence in Early Learning Digital Media Award ==
Given for the first time in 2019, this award is given to a digital media resource for early learners. The 2019 recipient was Play and Learn Science by PBS Kids. The two honor recipients were "Coral Reef" by Tinybop and "Lexi's World" by Pop Pop Pop.

== Odyssey Award ==
The Odyssey Award is given to the best audiobook for children or young adults.

Odyssey Award winners and honor audiobooks
| Title | Producer | Narrator | Author | Citation |
|---|---|---|---|---|
| Sadie | Macmillan Audio | Rebecca Soler, Fred Berman, Dan Bittner, Gabra Zackman, and more | Courtney Summers | Winner |
| Du Iz Tak | Weston Woods Studio | Eli D’Amico, Sebastian D’Amico, Burton Fott, Galen Fott, Laura Fott, Sarah Hart, Bella Higginbotham, Evelyn Hipp, and Brian Hull | Carson Ellis | Honor |
| Esquivel! Space-Age Sound Artist | Live Oak Media | Brian Amador | Susan Wood | Honor |
| The Parker Inheritance | Scholastic Audiobooks | Cherise Booth | Varian Johnson | Honor |
| The Poet X | HarperAudio | Elizabeth Acevedo | Elizabeth Acevedo | Honor |

== Printz Award ==
The Printz Award is given to excellence in young adult literature.

2019 Books
| Author | Book | Citation |
|---|---|---|
| Elizabeth Acevedo | The Poet X | Winner |
| Elana K. Arnold | Damsel | Honor |
| Deb Caletti | A Heart in a Body in the World | Honor |
| Mary McCoy | I, Claudia | Honor |

== Schenider Family Book Award ==
The Schnieder Family Book Award is given to a book that shows the disability experience.

2019 Awardees
| Award Type | Author | Illustrator | Title | Citation |
|---|---|---|---|---|
| Young Children | Jessica Kensky and Patrick Downes | Scott Magoon | Rescue and Jessica: A Life-Changing Friendship | Award |
| Young Children | Jessie Oliveros | Dana Wulfekotte | The Remember Balloons | Honor |
| Middle Grades | Leslie Connor | | The Truth as Told by Mason Buttle | Award |
| Middle Grades | Jacqueline Woodson | | The Collectors | Honor |
| Teens | Mark Oshiro | | Anger is a Gift | Award |
| Teens | Kelly Jensen (editor) | | (Don't) Call Me Crazy: 33 Voices Start the Conversation about Mental Health | Honor |

== Sibert Award ==
The Sibert Award is given to the most distinguished informational book for children.

2019 Robert F. Sibert Medal and Honor Books
| Writer | Illustrator | Title | Citation |
|---|---|---|---|
| Joyce Sidman | — | The Girl Who Drew Butterflies: How Maria Merian's Art Changed Science | Winner |
| Catherine Thimmesh | — | Camp Panda: Helping Cubs Return to the Wild | Honor |
| Gail Jarrow | — | Spooked!: How a Radio Broadcast and The War of the Worlds Sparked the 1938 Invasion of America | Honor |
| Don Brown | Don Brown | The Unwanted: Stories of the Syrian Refugees | Honor |
| Traci Sorell | Frané Lessac | We Are Grateful: Otsaliheliga | Honor |
| Michael Mahin | Jose Ramirez | When Angels Sing: The Story of Rock Legend Carlos Santana | Honor |

== Stonewall Book Award ==
The Stonewall Book Award is given to children's and young adult books relating to the gay, lesbian, bisexual, and transgender experience.

Stonewall Book Awards Winners
| Category | Recipient | Title | Award |
|---|---|---|---|
| Children's and Young Adult | Jessica Love | Julián Is a Mermaid | Winner |
| Children's and Young Adult | Kheryn Callender | Hurricane Child | Winner |
| Children's and Young Adult | Ashley Herring Blake | Ivy Aberdeen's Letter to the World | Honor |
| Children's and Young Adult | Kelly Loy Gilbert | Picture Us In The Light | Honor |

== Sydney Taylor Book Award ==
The Sydney Taylor Book Award is given to children's and young adult books that portray the Jewish experience. The younger reader winner was All-of-a-Kind Family Hanukkah by Emily Jenkins, illustrated by Paul O. Zelinsky, the older reader winner was Sweep: The Story of a Girl and Her Monster by Jonathan Auxier, and the teen reader winner was What the Night Sings by Vesper Stamper.

== YALSA Award for Excellence in Nonfiction for Young Adults ==
The YALSA Award for Excellence in Nonfiction for Young Adults was given to The Unwanted: Stories of the Syrian Refugees written and illustrated by Don Brown. Four books were given honors: The Beloved World of Sonia Sotomayor, by Sonia Sotomayor, Boots on the Ground: America's War in Vietnam, by Elizabeth Partridge, The Faithful Spy: Dietrich Bonhoeffer and the Plot to Kill Hitler, written and illustrated by John Hendrix, and Hey, Kiddo: How I Lost My Mother, Found My Father, and Dealt with Family Addiction, written and illustrated by Jarrett J. Krosoczka.

== Reaction and Reception ==
HarperCollins and Penguin-Random House each won the most recognition with 11 citations each. Forty-seven of the award winners were women, while 30 were men. The Newbery and Caldecott winners were considered surprising as they were not on many of the lists of predicted winners. The omission of Dreamers, winner of the Belpre Illustrator award, from the Caldecott was also criticized. Newbery winner Meg Medina, who serves on the advisory board of the advocacy organization We Need Diverse Books was pleased to see the diversity of the winners. Elizabeth Acevedo whose The Poet X won recognition for both the Printz and Belpre awards was "shaking" after hearing about her Printz win and was shocked at her Belpre win, "To get that honor is so special." Sophie Blackall said she was "weeping" when she learned she had won her second Caldecott Medal while visiting Myanmar.

== See also ==
School Library Reviews of the Winners
