= Broomfield Library =

Public library in Bloomfield, Colorado, US

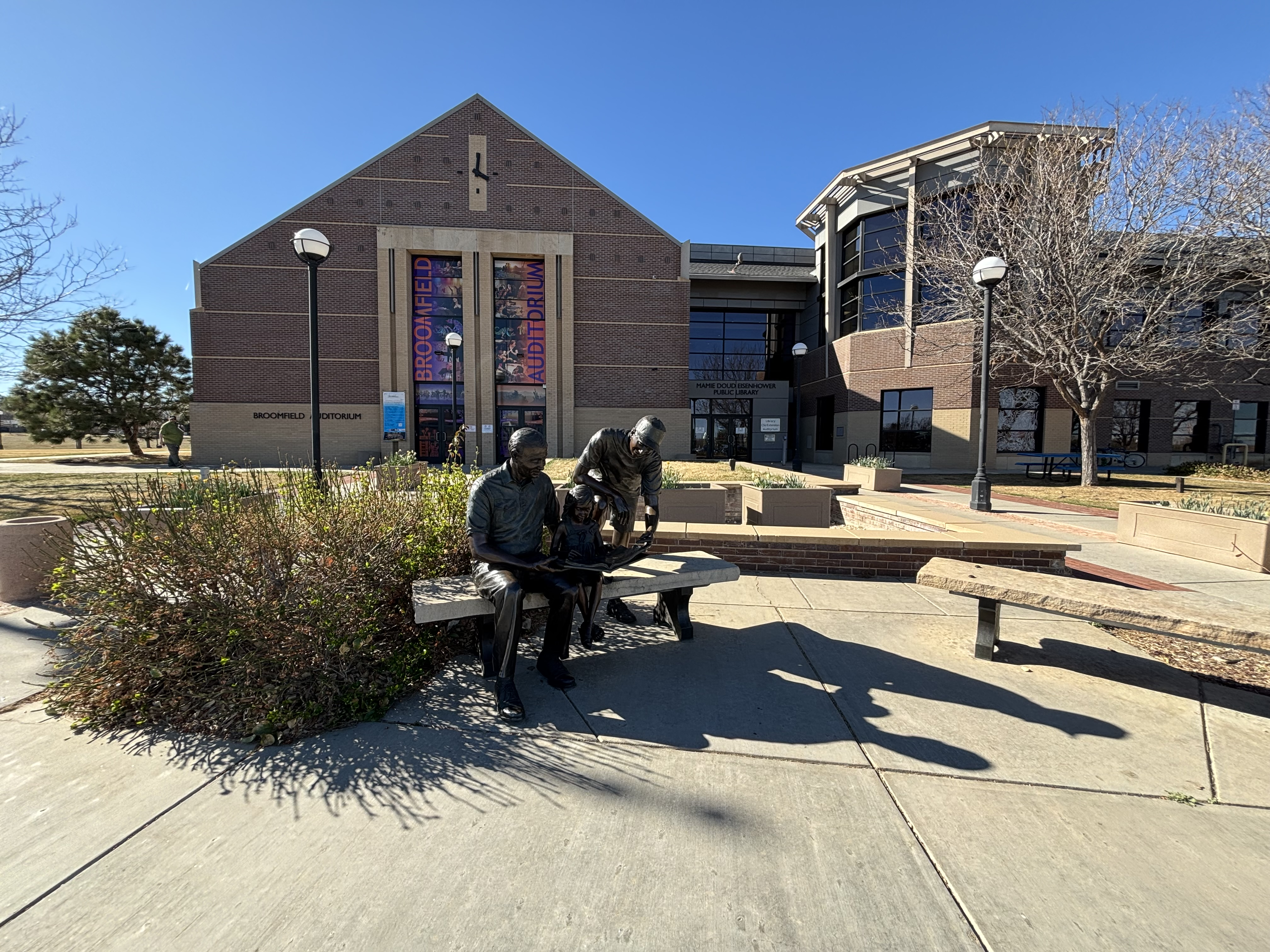
- 39.91758°N 105.06877°W
- Location: 3 Community Park Road, Broomfield, Colorado, USA
- Established: 1959

Other information
- Director: Kathryn Lynip
- Website: www.broomfield.org/276/library-home

The Broomfield Library, also called the Mamie Doud Eisenhower Public Library, is the public library of Broomfield, Colorado in the United States. The library is located at 3 Community Park Road and has a makerspace called inventHQ at #6 Garden Center. The library won the Heart of Broomfield award in 2021 for service to the community during the COVID 19 Pandemic and the Colorado Association of Libraries's President's Community award in 2022.

The Broomfield Library is a member of the Marmot Library Network, which provides cardholders with access to materials at all member libraries. The other member libraries in the network are Boulder, Clearview, Lafayette, Longmont, Louisville and Loveland.

== History ==
=== 1959-1975 ===
The first recorded meeting of the Broomfield Library Association was held in the home of Blanche Rosen on December 2, 1959. On January 13, 1960, a Library Board of Trustees was appointed, the library was incorporated and its bylaws were adopted, with Rev. Paul Holland elected chairman of the board. In 1961, when a city budget was established with funds for a library, Mary Jane Bailey became the first paid Library Director. Due to difficulties finding space, the Broomfield Library had an itinerant first several years. After opening its doors to the public at the Leonard Building at #14 Garden Center in 1960, the library relocated to the Aspen Cottage Elementary School building in September of that year, only to move again in December 1960 to the neighboring Holly Cottage Elementary School. When both buildings were sold, the Broomfield Library moved to the Broomfield Manor in September 1961, briefly sharing an office with the Broomfield Chamber of Commerce. Finally, in March 1963, the library opened the doors to its first permanent building at #12 Garden Center.

The land at #12 Garden Center was donated by Bal Swan of the Turnpike Land Company to the Broomfield Library. The cost to build the new library was $37,000. According to information from the Broomfield Historical Society, they had originally wanted to name the library after the president, but he declined and asked that it be named after his wife instead. However, other sources claim it was at the donor’s request that the building be named after Mamie Doud Eisenhower. General and Mrs. Eisenhower attended the official dedication in July 1963. As the town grew, a state mill levy increase provided the funds to expand the building to 7,224 square feet in 1975.

=== 1976-1999 ===
In August 1989, citizens approved a bond issue to fund a new municipal building designed to house the library alongside the police department and administrative offices. This second library location opened on February 6, 1995. Although the library moved into this shared modern complex, the Broomfield City Council voted to retain the Mamie Doud Eisenhower name.

=== 2000-present ===
In early 2000, the Broomfield City Council approved a new Library Site Development Plan. This current facility, located on Community Park Road, had a grand opening on November 10, 2001. At 28,409 square feet, it features a 300-seat auditorium and a second-story reading terrace overlooking Community Park.

==== inventHQ makerspace (2018-present) ====
Broomfield's makerspace, inventHQ, opened in April 2018 as a "collaborative shared-tool workshop." The 1,456 square-foot space on the second floor of #6 Garden Center hosts programs and open hours for people who want to use tools for laser engraving and cutting, 3D printing, digital embroidery, sewing, vinyl cutting, and small board electronics projects.

==== Fine-free status (2019-present) ====
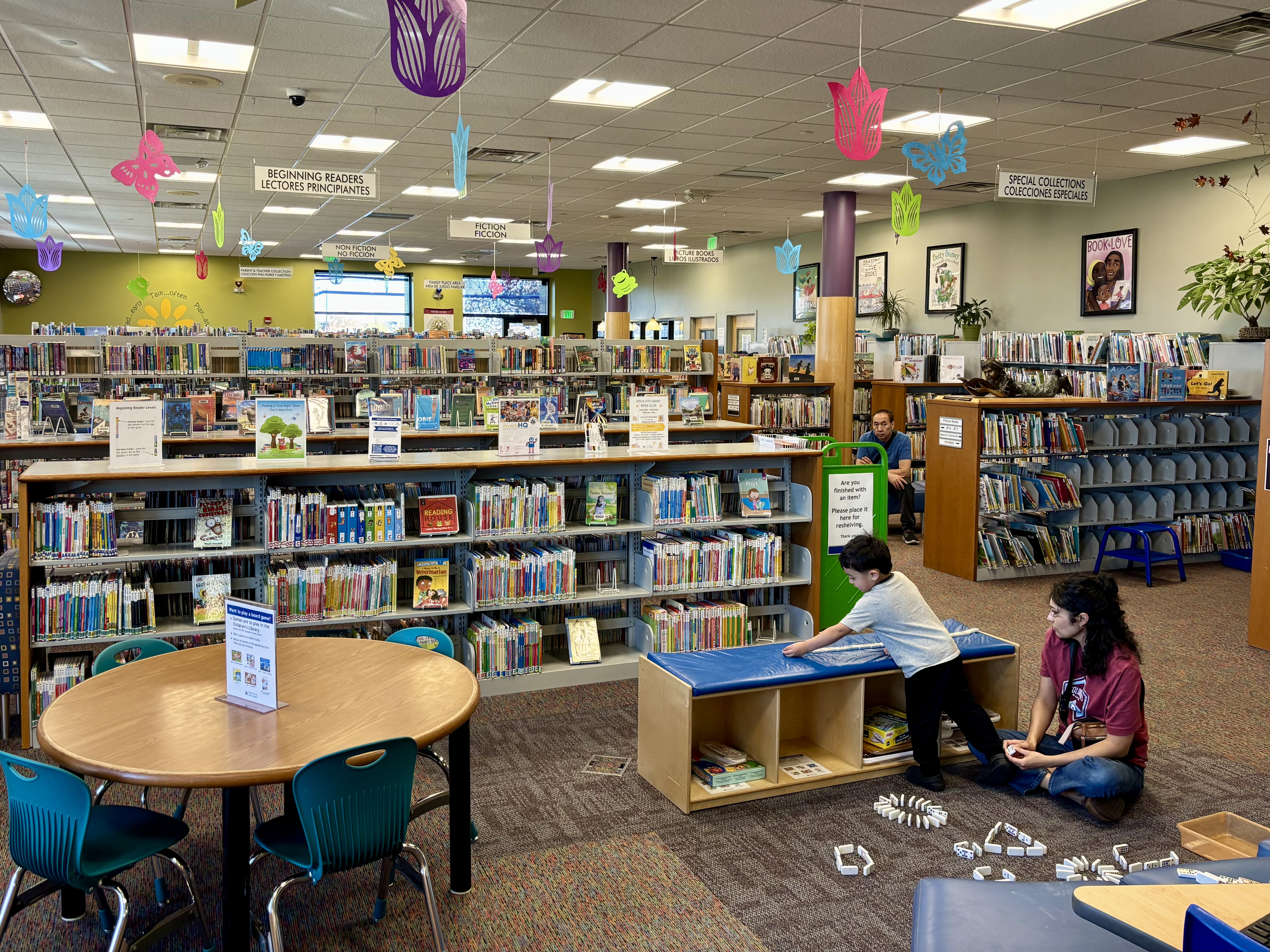
The Children's Library at the Broomfield Library, which is entirely fine-free. When the fine-free policy took effect in 2019, nearly 500 children regained the ability to check out books.

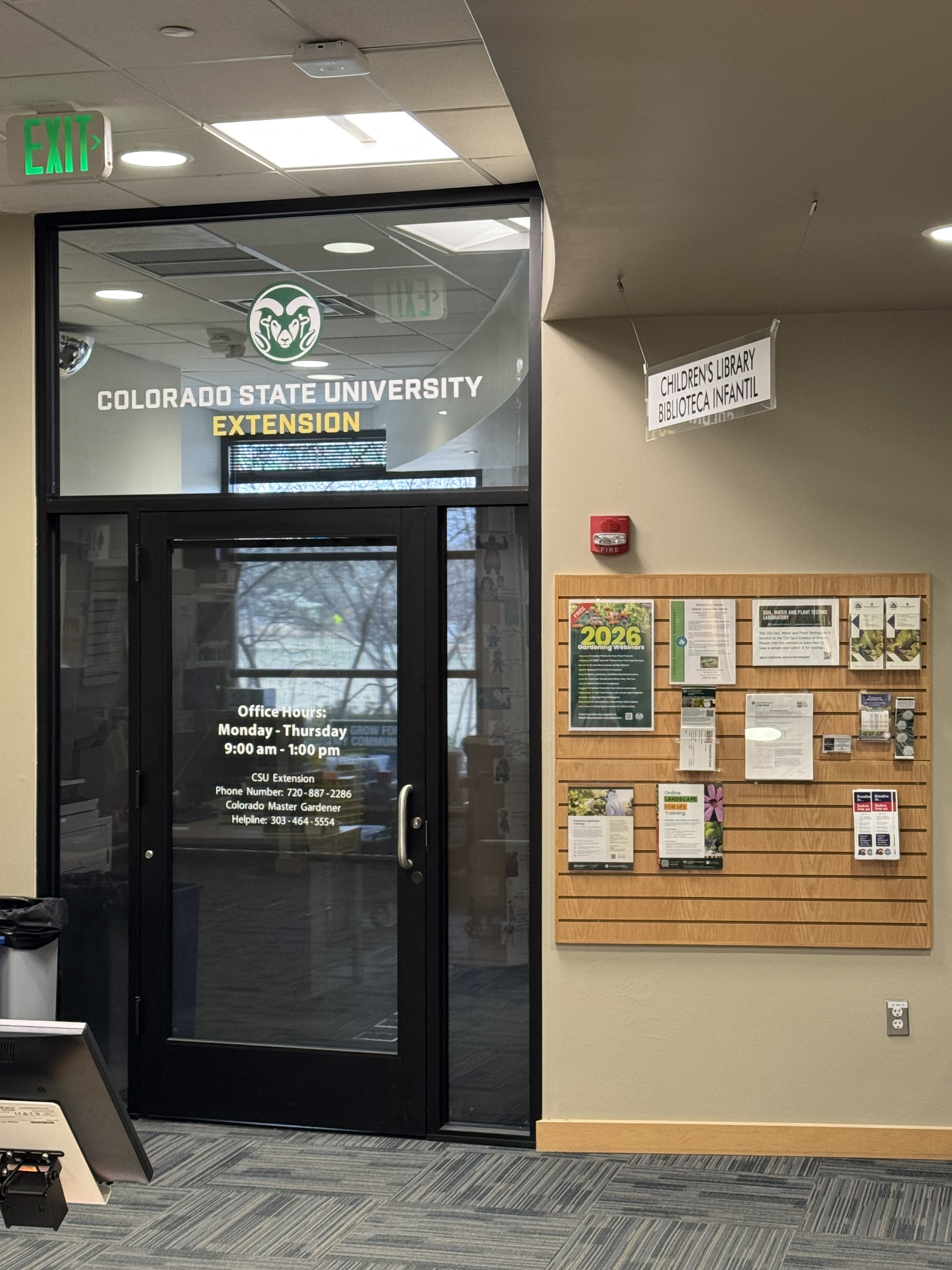
CSU Extension office located inside The Broomfield Library

In 2018, the Broomfield City Council voted in support of director of Library Services and Cultural Affairs Abby Yellman's recommendation to eliminate fines throughout the Broomfield Library system. In her research with other library staff, Yellman found that libraries that had already gone fine free, including Arapahoe Libraries and Anythink Libraries, had seen an increase in returned materials, an increase in circulation, or both. Meanwhile, Broomfield data indicated that lower income families, including many with children, were disproportionately impacted by the library's fine policy, which suspended a user's account when their fines reached $10. The change to a fully fine-free library took place in January 2019.

==== CSU Extension Office (2020-present) ====
Colorado State University (CSU) Extension opened a branch in Broomfield in 2002, which was originally housed at #6 Garden Center and then moved into the basement of the George Di Ciero City and County Building at 1 Descombes Drive. In 2020, the CSU Extension Office moved into the first floor of the Broomfield Library, a partnership described by Mayor Guyleen Castriotta as "vitally important." The Broomfield Library Friends Foundation gifted three tower gardens to the CSU Extension Office, one of which sits in the library lobby.

==== Naloxone distribution site (2023-present) ====
Like many other counties, Broomfield has suffered from the national opioid crisis. Between 2013 and 2023, 71 Broomfield residents died of opioid drug overdoses, and between 2016 and 2023, there were 141 emergency department visits for an overdose involving opioids.

In July 2023, the Broomfield Library became one of two distribution sites in Broomfield for free Narcan, the brand name for naloxone, a nasal spray used to reverse opioid overdose. The other site is the Broomfield Municipal Court. Residents can visit either location to anonymously obtain free Narcan, along with an educational handout. Data from the first year of the free distribution program suggests that it has been highly successful in preventing deaths from opioid overdoses. According to Broomfield public health coordinator Kelsey Warren, “In 2022 we had 11 overdose deaths related to opioids, in 2023 we had only three. That drop is really big, and it is definitely an achievement, and it shows all of what we’re doing in Broomfield is working, and we need to continue to do these things.”

== Collections ==
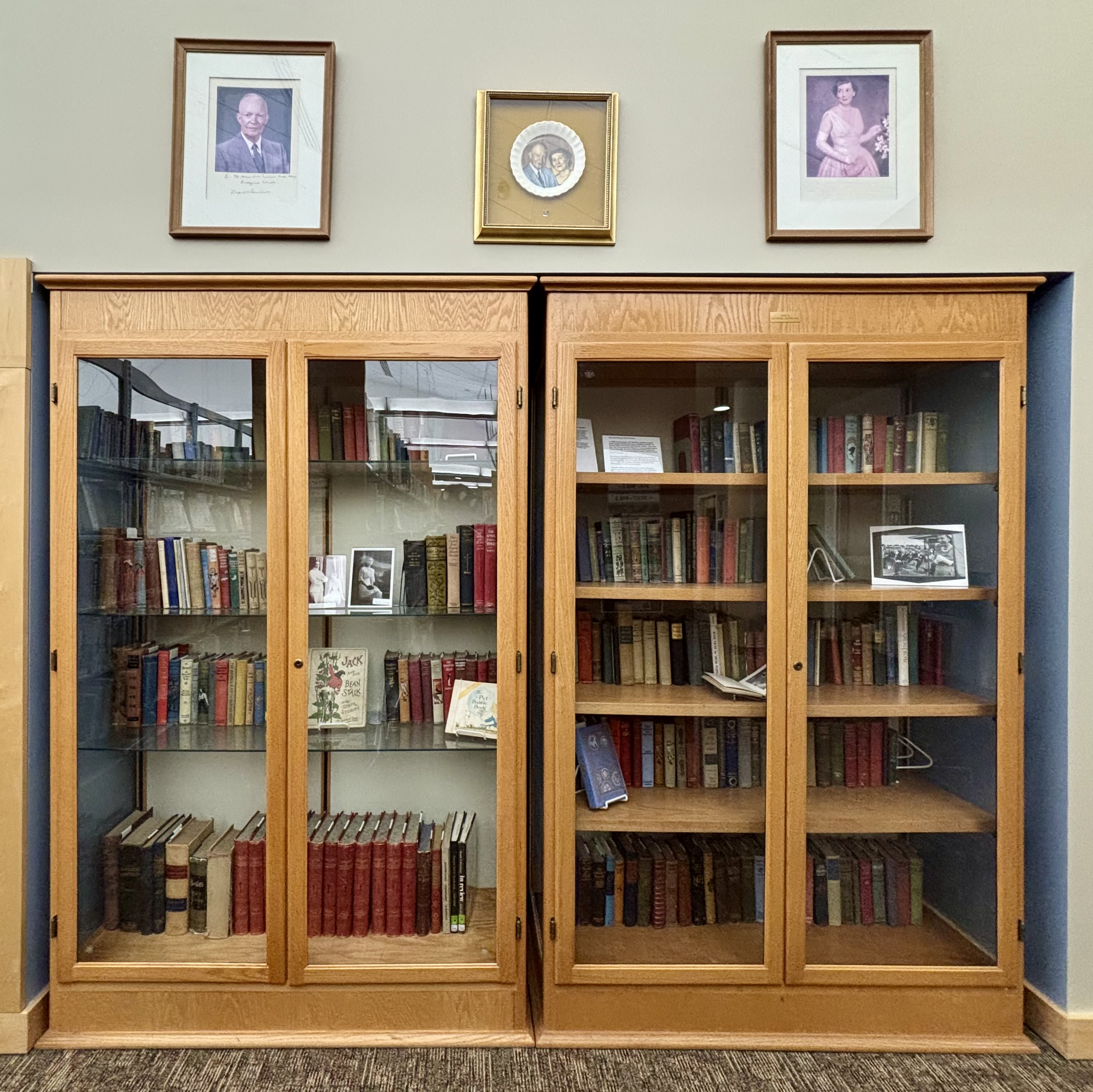
The Mamie Doud Eisenhower Collection at the Broomfield Library.

Mamie Doud Eisenhower donated a collection of books from her family’s home in Denver to the library which can be seen in glass cases on the second floor of the current library building. A complete list of the titles can be found here.

== Programs & Special Events ==
The Broomfield Library hosts programs weekly. Some examples include Tech Tutoring, English Conversation Group, Family Storytime, Tech Cafe at the Refuge, Workforce Services at the Library, 6th to 8th Grade Book Club, Music and Movement, Baby Storytime, Broomfield Chess Club, Read to a Dog, Mile High Yo-Yo Club and Outcast Knitting Group.

The Broomfield Library has historically had a summer reading program with varying themes such as "Be a Summer Bookworm", "Go for the Gold" and "Color Our World". The program evolved to "Summer Library Adventures" and encourages patrons to "mix and or match" a designated amount of reading and activities.

=== One Book One Broomfield (OBOB) & One Book One Broomfield Junior (OBOB Jr.) ===
One Book One Broomfield (OBOB) and One Book One Broomfield Junior (OBOB Jr.) are community reading programs "designed to foster community spirit through literature." OBOB started in 2006, eight years after the first One Book program took place in Seattle in 1998. OBOB Jr. began in 2019 and has a focus on young readers across different age groups.

==== One Book One Broomfield selections (in reverse chronological order) ====
- 2006: The Meadow by James Galvin
- 2007: The Greatest Generation by Tom Brokaw
- 2008: Breakfast with Buddha by Roland Merullo
- 2009: Eventide by Kent Haruf
- 2010: Hotel on the Corner of Bitter and Sweet by Jamie Ford
- 2011: Thinking in Pictures by Temple Grandin
- 2012: Healer by Carol Cassella
- 2013: The Dog Stars by Peter Heller
- 2014: Blood Memory by Margaret Coel
- 2015: Neverhome by Laird Hunt
- 2016: Grandma Gatewood’s Walk by Ben Montgomery
- 2017: Dark Matter by Blake Crouch
- 2018: Lucky Boy by Shanthi Sekaran
- 2019: Beautiful Boy by David Sheff
- 2020: Deep Creek: Finding Hope in the High Country by Pam Houston
- 2021: Afterlife by Julia Alvarez
- 2022: The Honey Bus: A Memoir of Loss, Courage and a Girl Saved by Bees by Meredith May
- 2023: Killers of the Flower Moon: The Osage Murders and the Birth of the FBI by David Grann
- 2024: Remarkably Bright Creatures by Shelby Van Pelt
- 2025: Happiness Falls by Angie Kim
- 2026: The House in the Cerulean Sea by TJ Klune

==== One Book One Broomfield Jr. selections (in reverse chronological order) ====
- 2019: Extra Yarn by Mac Barnett
- 2021: Because of Winn-Dixie by Kate DiCamillo
- 2022: Ghost by Jason Reynolds
- 2023: Dreamers by Yuyi Morales
- 2024: When the Mountain Meets the Moon by Grace Lin
- 2025: A First Time for Everything by Dan Santat
- 2026: The Book of Turtles by Sy Montgomery

== Broomfield Library Friends Foundation ==
=== Mission and Vision ===
The Broomfield Library Friends Foundation has a stated mission to support the Library by raising funds and promoting awareness and enjoyment of the library's programs and services. All fundraising efforts directly support Library, Arts, History and Extension programs and services. They enVision a literate, innovative and culturally aware community where all are free to interact with the library and their community.

=== History ===
The Broomfield Library Friends Foundation (BLFF) was founded on December 2, 1959 by a group of community members led by Mary Jane Bailey, who later became the first Broomfield Library director. Foundation dues were $1.00 per member, later raised to $2.00. The Foundation remained active through the 1960s-1970s but was completely defunct by 1983.

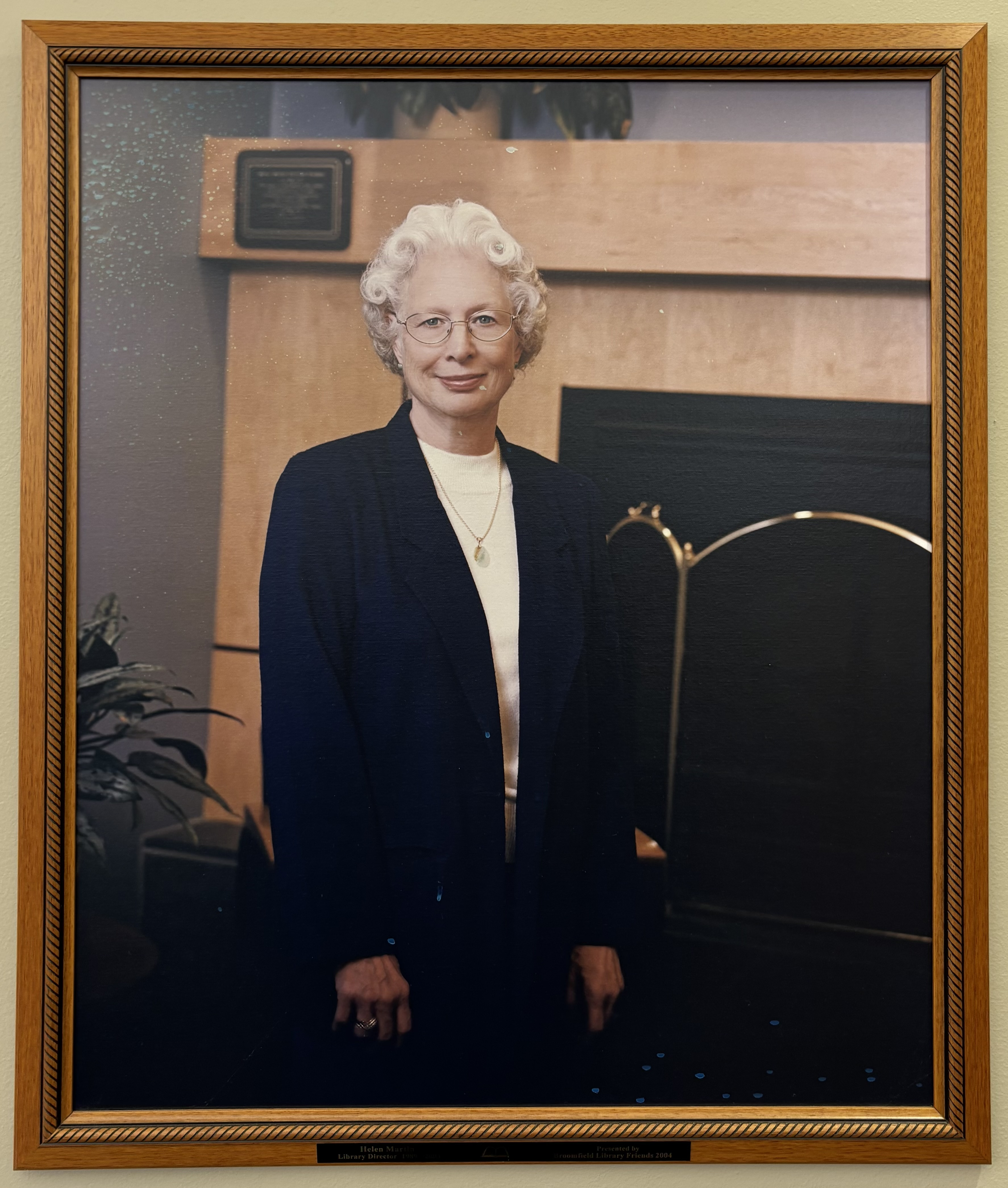
This portrait of Helen Martin, who served as the director of the Broomfield Library from 1989-2003, was donated by the Broomfield Library Friends Foundation in 2004 and hangs in the fireplace lounge on the second floor of the current library building at 3 Community Park Road.

In 1992, Library Director Helen Martin revived the BLFF with an eye toward fundraising for a future new, standalone library building. In 2001, the Friends group assisted staff with the move to the current Broomfield Public Library and Auditorium building at 3 Community Park Rd.

=== Fundraising Efforts ===
The Library Friends Bookstore, located inside the Broomfield Library, offers a selection of materials, including books, CDs and DVDs available to purchase for a nominal fee. The bookstore is maintained by BLFF and restocked with both modern and classics on a regular basis.

The Lasting Legacy Brick Campaign encourages community members to purchase a paver brick to be engraved with a message in honor or in memory of someone who is or was a Broomfield Library patron or an enthusiastic reader or a supporter of public libraries as an institution. Once engraved, bricks are added to the walkway leading to the main entrance to the library.

In addition to annual fundraising events and on behalf of the library, the BLFF seeks-out grants to be used toward library services and programming that will increase community access to materials and technology.

=== Notable Contributions to The Library ===
Through the years, BLFF has contributed many resources to improve the efficiency and appearance of the library, including software and computer equipment, furniture, and the Generations sculpture that welcomes everyone to building. Several of the Broomfield Library’s programs and services have come as a direct result of the fundraising efforts and grant procurements of the Broomfield Library Friends Foundation, including:

- One Book One Broomfield author talks
- Mobile Wifi Hotspots
- Materials vending machines

== List of library directors (1961-present) ==
1. Mary Jane Bailey as Library Director, 1961-1989
2. Helen Martin as Library Director, 1989-2003
3. Roberta Depp as director of Library Services (starting 2003) and Cultural Affairs (starting 2007), 2003-2016
4. Abby Yellman as Director of Library Services and Cultural Affairs, 2016-2019
5. Kathryn Lynip as Director of Library, Arts, History and Extension, 2019–present
