= A Big Mooncake for Little Star =

2018 picture book by Grace Lin

- First edition book cover, designed by Grace Lin
- Author: Grace Lin
- Illustrator: Grace Lin
- Language: English
- Genre: Children's picture book
- Publisher: Little, Brown and Company
- Publication date: August 28, 2018
- Publication place: United States of America
- Media type: Print (hardback)
- Pages: unpaged
- Awards: Caldecott Honor
- ISBN: 978-0-31640-448-8
- OCLC: 962749887

A Big Mooncake for Little Star is a 2018 picture book written and illustrated by Grace Lin. The story is about Little Star gradually eating the mooncake that her mother has baked. The book was a departure for Lin both thematically and in her use of illustrative style. The book was well reviewed and was awarded a Caldecott Honor in 2019. The illustrations feature heavy use of black and rely on both the pictures and words to convey the story and its themes.

== Plot ==
As the book opens Little Star's mother has just finished making a "Big mooncake" and asks the young girl to not touch it. After awaking in the middle of the night, Little Star forgets what her mother had asked of her and takes a small bite and then runs back to bed. This is repeated each night with the mooncake getting smaller and smaller, until Little Star's mother discovers what's happened. The book ends with the two baking a new mooncake.

== Background and publication ==
The book was written to celebrate Lin's "favorite Asian holiday", the Mid-Autumn Festival (what Lin calls the Autumn Moon Festival). She wanted a story for the festival to tell her three-year-old daughter after they had exhausted traditional tales, such as those about the Moon rabbit, and her daughter demanded more. The story was then inspired after her daughter ate all the mooncakes for the year and learned that there would be no more until next year. With the book, Lin was responding to her despair after the 2016 United States presidential election and an art exhibit about the Americana of Robert McCloskey she had taken her daughter to. In the exhibit Lin noticed that there was no Asian representation for her daughter to see and then further thought about Coles Phillips' illustrations where the characters blend into the background, which also lacked Asian characters. Little Star was inspired by Lin's daughter and also created to be an example of the Asian representation Lin had felt was missing.

The book was published on August 28, 2018, by Little, Brown and Company.

== Writing and illustrations ==
For Lin, this book represented a change in theme from examining her Asian heritage to claiming her American identity. A Big Mooncake for Little Star is about the phases of the moon and represented a new illustrative style for Lin who had previously illustrated her chapter books like Where the Mountain Meets the Moon with block print. In this book, Lin used gouache on watercolor paper. Black plays an important role in the book's illustrations, contributing to the nighttime sky theme. Author Samantha Hunt writing in The New York Times wrote of how "the rich darkness of the book’s pages is cut by the glorious gold of the stars". The food combines with the background to further space imagery with the crumbs of the mooncake become the stars while spilled milk resembles the Milky Way. This reinforces the book's space theme with Little Star's eating of the mooncakes representing the phases of the moon, though this is not directly stated. The heavy use of black also allows for more emphasis on where and how the book's text is placed and helps reinforce the space theme. Lin's writing and illustrations combined to produce a mysterious and slightly irreverent tone in this original fable.

The book's mother-daughter relationship gives a reassuring feeling to the reader. Lin was particularly proud of the endpapers and their homage to McClosky's Blueberries for Sal. She also wanted to capture "the same mother-daughter bond, that timeless love of family, that passing along of traditions and skills. Those things that go beyond race and nationality." The book was also compared to Maurice Sendak's In the Night Kitchen.

== Reviews and awards ==
The book was generally well reviewed. It was given a starred review and was named a best book of 2018 by Kirkus Reviews and Publishers Weekly, while The Washington Post named it as a best book of the year. It also received starred reviews from Booklist, with author and editor Ilene Cooper praising the illustrations and Lin's "intriguing characters who come alive through facial expressions", The Horn Book Magazine, and the School Library Journal.

The book was a recipient of a 2019 Caldecott Honor for its illustrations. Lin had tried to tune out the chatter around A Big Mooncake for Little Star being a possible Caldecott book. She had thought the odds of a win were unlikely, so she scheduled a massage when the awards were announced as a way to, "feel special when the dream ended." When she hadn't heard anything by mid-morning she thought it wasn't going to happen and so she was surprised when a little while later her phone rang. The Caledcott had been a signal of quality for Lin who had studied illustration at the Rhode Island School of Design in part because of multiple Caldecott winner Chris Van Allsburg's association with the school. The Wall Street Journal noted that this book was part of a "cheerful" set of Caldecott Medal and Honor books.
