= Merullo =

Merullo is a surname. Notable people with the surname include:

- Lennie Merullo (1917–2015), American baseball player
- Matt Merullo (born 1965), American baseball player, grandson of Lennie
- Roland Merullo (born 1953), American author
