= Thank You, Omu! =

2018 picture book by Oge Mora

- Author: Oge Mora
- Publisher: Little, Brown and Company
- Publication date: October 2, 2018
- Pages: unpaged
- Awards: Caldecott Honor, Coretta Scott King Steptoe Award
- ISBN: 978-0-316-43124-8

Thank You, Omu! is a 2018 picture book written and illustrated by Oge Mora. The story is about Omu, who cooks a stew and shares it with her neighbors; they show their gratitude by bringing her food. The book started as an assignment for a class of Mora's at the Rhode Island School of Design, where it was seen by an editor from Little, Brown. Thank You, Omu was well reviewed and a recipient of the 2019 Caldecott Honor for its illustrations. The book's mixed media drew praise for their detailed depictions of characters and locations.

== Background and publication ==
The book, originally titled Omu's Stew, started as a student project for a class of Mora's at the Rhode Island School of Design: an assignment which required a character to have gained or lost something. While Omu is the Igbo word for queen, Mora's family had also used it to mean grandmother. In the book's backmatter, Mora credits her grandmother as one of her strong female role models. An editor for Little, Brown was present when the students' books were presented and signed Mora before she even had an agent. The book was published on October 2, 2018.

== Plot ==
Omu makes a stew for dinner and its smell spreads throughout the neighbourhood. One by one, starting with a boy, members of the community knock on her door to ask her for some of the stew, which Omu always gives. When Omu is ready for dinner, there is no more stew left. However, the community then brings her food to show their gratitude. They eat together and have a dance party.

== Writing and illustrations ==
Mora chose a mixed media approach of cut paper, paint, and china markers for the book's illustrations. The use of collage gives, in the words of author Benjamin Anastas in The New York Times, "the book’s world a sense of depth and vibrancy." Mora's use of collage allows her to create evocative and distinct characters and attractive backgrounds. The use of mixed-medium collage was compared to the way stew is assembled and the book's themes of diversity and inclusion by Calling Caldecott 's Monique Harris. The illustration of the steam from the stew spreading through the neighbourhood received particular attention and praise. The illustrations are bright and in a style that reflects Mora's Nigerian roots and her experience in the African-American community, “I really love that I could combine Nigerian and American traditions and create a book that exists in a third space like I myself do". Her illustrations drew comparisons to that of Ezra Jack Keats.

The nature of the story resembled folklore according to some reviewers. Omu's kindness being repaid by the neighbors helps to reinforce the book's theme of food as a means to sharing, diversity, and inclusion. By sharing the food together at the end the individuals come together as a community. Through her sharing of her food, the main character becomes a grandmother to the entire community. The book's advanced vocabulary, repetition, and onomatopoeia help it to be a good book to be read aloud.

== Reception and awards ==
The book received a starred review from Kirkus Reviews; Publishers Weekly, who also named it to their best books of 2018, praised the book as a "sweet story of inclusivity, gratitude, and delicious fellowship is also a feast for the eyes"; and School Library Journal, with reviewer Maria Salvadore writing, "Children will enjoy this fresh, engaging story of friendship and community building, perfect for any group gathering."

At the 2019 Youth Media Awards, the book was the recipient of a 2019 Caldecott Honour for its illustrations and the Coretta Scot King Steptoe Award for best new illustrator. Mora didn't answer the phone calling to tell her that she'd won the Caldecott Honor as she assumed it was a telemarketer only answering it when it called back a few minutes later. Upon hearing the news she cried say that, "Like most children’s book illustrators it has always been my dream to get Caldecott recognition one day. I simply cannot believe this has happened so early in my career but I am incredibly grateful." The book also won a 2019 Ezra Jack Keats Book Award for its illustrations.
