= The Year of the Dog (novel) =

2006 children's novel by Grace Lin

- Author: Grace Lin
- Illustrator: Grace Lin
- Language: English
- Series: The Pacy Trilogy
- Genre: Children's fiction; middle-grade fiction
- Publisher: Little Brown and Company
- Publication date: February 2006
- Media type: Print (hardcover), Print (paperback)
- Pages: 134
- ISBN: 0-316-06000-3

The Year of the Dog (2006) is a semi-autobiographical children’s novel by Grace Lin. The book follows a young Taiwanese-American girl, Pacy (also known by her American name, Grace), as she navigates identity, family relationships, friendship, and culture during the Chinese Zodiac Year of the Dog.

The novel unpacks themes of Chinese/Taiwanese identity, cultural traditions, and coming-of-age stories. It blends realistic fiction with personal storytelling and anecdotes from the author. The book is Lin’s first chapter book and the first in the Pacy Trilogy series. The Year of the Dog is followed by The Year of the Rat (2007) and Dumpling Days (2012).

== Background ==
Lin also notes a lack of cultural representation in her experience of children’s literature. She says that she wrote this because it is the book she wished she had growing up. Furthermore, Lin notes that her favorite childhood books, Anne of Green Gables and Little Women, have a lot of "heartfelt sentiment", which is something she hopes to achieve in her own work.

The Year of the Dog took Grace Lin five years to write. She said the novel came about as an accident when many of Lin’s family members encouraged her to write a sequel to her first picture book, The Ugly Vegetables. She could not turn this idea into a picture book, resulting instead in The Year of the Dog.

== Summary ==
The Year of the Dog opens with Pacy and her family celebrating Chinese New Year as they ring in the year of the dog. Pacy and her sisters, Lissy and Ki-Ki are helping their parents set up for the holiday dinner. Pacy’s mom notes that the year of the dog is a lucky year, meant for family, friends, and finding oneself. Over the course of the upcoming year, Pacy sets out to discover her talents and her identity.

At school, Pacy becomes increasingly aware that she and her sisters are the only Asian-American students. She meets Melody, another Taiwanese-American girl, whose family has just moved to the area. Pacy and Melody become fast friends, calling each other “almost-twins” due to their many similarities.

Grace and her family attend their cousin Albert’s red egg party, which is a Chinese celebration to commemorate a child's first one hundred days of life. At the party, Pacy and her family spend time with extended family while learning about Taiwanese traditions.

At the end of the school year, the school play is announced: The Wizard of Oz. Pacy dreams of being cast as Dorothy, practicing night and day. After a classmate says that Dorothy cannot be Chinese, Pacy loses her confidence and does not audition for the lead. She is cast as a munchkin. Pacy becomes discouraged by the lack of Asian representation in the media. Though she faces stage-fright, she later feels accomplished by her performance.

Grace enters the “Written and Illustrated by…The National Awards Contest for Students” competition at school, in which students write and illustrate a book. Though Grace faces writer’s block at first, she decides to write about her own experiences as a Chinese-American, since she has never seen this depicted in literature. She writes a book titled The Ugly Vegetables. Pacy’s father gives her paint to illustrate her book. At the close of the novel, it is revealed that from 20,000 entries, The Ugly Vegetables wins fourth place in The National Awards Contest for Students. Pacy hopes to become an author when she grows up.

At the suggestion of Melody’s mother, Pacy’s mom signs her family up for Taiwanese-American Camp (TAC). Melody’s family attends TAC with Pacy’s family for the first week, but departs before the second week. Pacy feels lonely, so her mother signs her up for art classes. The other girls make fun of Pacy, calling her an “Americanized twinkie” because she cannot speak Chinese or Taiwanese. Pacy’s mom consoles her, telling her that she is Chinese, Taiwanese, and American–she doesn’t need to pick only one aspect of her identity.

Near the end of the novel, Pacy and her family celebrate Christmas “the Chinese Way”. Pacy asks for a porcelain china doll, but her mother misunderstands and gives her a Chinese doll. The novel ends as Pacy and Melody’s families celebrate Chinese New Year again, welcoming the year of the rat. Pacy realizes that she has discovered her love of writing and gained new friends during the year of the dog.

The book also features short, flashback style stories largely drawn from the experiences of the author and her family. These include stories about Pacy’s mom immigrating to America, how Pacy began to be known as 'Grace' at school, and how Grandpa became successful as a doctor.

== Characters ==
- Pacy: The protagonist, a Taiwanese American girl exploring her identity and interests.
- Melody: Pacy’s friend and fellow Taiwanese American, whom she considers her "almost twin."
- Lissy: Pacy’s older sister, who will soon enter junior high.
- Ki-Ki: Pacy’s younger sister
- Mr and Mrs Lin: Pacy’s parents, who guide her understanding of family and cultural identity.

== Themes ==
The Year of the Dog explores themes of identity, cultural belonging, friendship, and the challenges associated with growing up.

== Autobiographical elements ==
Growing up, Lin and her sisters were the only Asian students in their elementary school. Like Pacy, Lin also felt out of place for not speaking her heritage language.

Grace Lin notes that the scene in which Pacy wins The National Awards Contest for Students was based on an event in Lin’s own life. Like Pacy, this sparked Lin’s goal of becoming an author. Just as Pacy hoped to portray the Asian-American experience in her novel, Lin also was inspired to write children's literature due to the lack of Asian American representation.

== Cultural elements ==
Grace Lin represents Taiwanese and Chinese cultural traditions and language in The Year of the Dog. Lin includes Chinese phrases in the novel, using the corresponding pinyin.

A scholarly article by Susan Thananopavarn examines how Lin’s writing incorporates cultural elements into The Year of the Dog with accuracy and intention. Thananopavarn argues that Lin’s representations of Taiwanese and Chinese American culture, especially through everyday experiences, help challenge stereotypes. One example is Lin’s use of food, which serves as an important cultural marker. The inclusion of traditional dishes and food practices reflect Pacy’s identities as Chinese, Taiwanese, and American. Some examples include Pacy’s mixing of M&Ms with Chinese New Year candy, trips to the Chinese grocery store for lychees, and Thanksgiving turkey served alongside rice noodles.

== Analysis ==
The Year of the Dog received positive recognition following its publication. Grace Lin was originally wary about The Year of the Dog’s success, stating that she and her publishers waited to see how it was received before beginning work on a sequel.

The novel has been widely used in educational settings and reading programs. A 2022 article from The Reading Teacher describes the use of The Year of the Dog in a kids bookclub which seeks to help readers see texts as mirrors for their own experiences. The Michigan Reading Journal notes that The Year of the Dog was used to teach children vocabulary while supporting emotional identification and development. The Journal of Social Theory in Art Education describes The Year of the Dog’s reception at the University of Georgia, in which students read the book during Lunar New Year celebrations. Readers stated that they connected with Grace’s experiences and allowed them to understand their own experiences as Asian-Americans.

Readers, particularly Asian-Americans, have reported strong personal connections to the text, identifying it as a “mirror” reflecting their own experiences.

== Publication ==
The following publication data has been gathered from Grace Lin's website and published reviews of The Year of the Dog.

Publisher: Little Brown and Company

Genre: Children’s fiction; middle grade fiction

Format: Hardcover original, paperback edition followed

Publication Date: February, 2006
