= Viva Frida =

2014 children's picture book by Yuyi Morales and Tim O'Meara

- Author: Yuyi Morales
- Illustrator: Tim O' Meara
- Language: English
- Genre: Children's literature
- Published: 2014 Roaring Brook Press
- Publication place: United States
- Media type: Picture book (hardcover)
- Pages: 40
- ISBN: 1596436034

Viva Frida is a children's book written and illustrated by Yuyi Morales in collaboration with photographer Tim O'Meara. It was published by Roaring Brook Press in 2014 and was selected as a Caldecott Honor Book in 2015.

== Plot ==
The story follows Frida Kahlo, a world-renowned and unconventional artist whose art is appreciated all around the world. The story illustrates the different stages of her life and how they influenced her to become an artist.

== Critical reception ==
Viva Frida received numerous reviews. Horn Book called it "GORGEOUS" and Booklist Reviews noted that "Morales artistically distills the essence of the remarkable Frida Kahlo in this esoteric, multigenre picture book." Kirkus Reviews wrote "this luminescent homage to Frida Kahlo doesn’t hew to her artwork’s mood but entrances on its own merit," and concluded "out of context, visually radiant; as an introduction to Kahlo herself, almost irrelevant." Publishers Weekly noted that "Frida is presented less as a historical figure than as an icon who represents the life Morales holds sacred; Frida lives because she loves and creates." The School Library Journal wrote "Morales's perception of her creative process results in a fresh, winning take on an artist who has rarely been understood... Morales's art and O'Meara's photographs take this book to another level," and concluded "a resonant title that can be used anywhere Kahlo's art is studied. It will also be admired in bilingual collections." The New York Times found "there is plenty for young children to look at, though Morales’s Frida dolls do not capture much of a likeness beyond the artist’s famous unibrow, and they convey an un-Frida-like carefree quality," and Common Sense Media called it "a captivating book". The Nashville Public Library described it as "an absolutely stunning, resolutely beautiful book."
