= The Poet X =

2018 novel by Elizabeth Acevedo

- Author: Elizabeth Acevedo
- Language: English
- Genre: Young adult verse novel
- Set in: Harlem, New York City
- Publisher: Quill Tree Books
- Publication date: 2018
- Media type: Print
- Pages: 368
- Awards: Michael L. Printz Award; Carnegie Medal

The Poet X, published March 6, 2018 by Quill Tree Books, is a young adult novel by Elizabeth Acevedo. Fifteen-year-old Xiomara, also known as "X" or "Xio," works through the tension and conflict in her family by writing poetry. The Poet X addresses themes of patriarchy, sexism, and objectification of young women through X's experiences. The book, a New York Times bestseller, was well received and won multiple awards at the 2019 Youth Media Awards as well as the Carnegie Medal for Writing.

== Plot ==
Xiomara Batista is a fifteen-year-old Dominican teenager living in Harlem who loves to write poetry. Though she longs to share it with the world, her religious mother is only concerned with her being confirmed, which has been put off for three years. She feels inferior to her brother Xavier (affectionately called Twin), as he receives much praise for his work.

During the school year, she develops a love for her lab partner, Aman. However, the relationship is broken when her mother sees them kissing on a train. Eventually, her mother finds her poetry, forcing a confrontation between the two.

== Banned book controversy ==
The Banned Book Project of Carnegie Mellon University identifies the book as banned. In a Federal District Court case in North Carolina, parents asserted The Poet X was Anti-Christian and violated their right to freedom of religion. The court dismissed the case, citing the widely held judicial principle that education is not indoctrination.

== Themes ==
Scholars have emphasized the important of visibility and voice in The Poet X. Rebecca Foote described Xiomara's development as becoming "unhide-able" highlights how poetry allows her to resist being silenced and assert her identity. The novel also explores Afro-Latinidad and Dominican identity, particularly through Xiomara's experience with her religious mother and her community. As discussed in LatinoUSA, Acevedo's work centers "the complexities of Afro-Latinidad" and the importance of finding one's voice, as Xiomara did through poetry.

== Style ==
The Poet X is a novel in verse, reflecting Acevedo's background in spoken word poetry. The poetic form emphasized voice and emotional expression. As expressed in a review by The Poetry Society, the novel showcases Acevedo's strength as a poet, using verse to convey Xiomara's internal thoughts and experiences as a young Afro-Latina woman. Critics also highlight how poetry functions as a tool for identity formation. Foote notes that Xiomara's writing allows her to claim visibility and express herself in ways that were forbidden for her.

== Cultural significance ==
The novel is significant for its representation of Afro-Latina identity and Dominican culture in young adult literature. Acevedo's work highlights experiences often underrepresented in mainstream narratives. According to Latino USA, Acevedo's work centers voices that are often marginalized and highlights lived experiences of Afro-Latina women. As she also mentions in her other book "With the Fire on High" she makes the protagonist a pregnant high school senior from Harlem, because she wants her readers who are young Afro-Latina women to be identified in her characters. Through Xiomara's story the novel explores the intersection of race, gender, culture, and religious expectations, contributing to broader discussions about identity and what it means to be Dominican.

In Slovenia, the State Subject Commission for English for the General Matura (Državna komisija za splošno maturo za angleščino), operating under the National Examinations Centre (RIC), selected the novel as a prescribed literary text for the General Matura exam in English for 2028.

== Reception and awards ==
The Poet X was well reviewed, receiving starred reviews from The Horn Book Magazine, Kirkus Reviews, Publishers Weekly, Shelf Awareness, and School Library Journal, as well as positive reviews from Booklist, the Bulletin of the Center for Children’s Books, and The New York Times.

The audiobook received a starred review from Booklist. It was the fourth most ordered book at the New York Public Library in 2018.

In 2018, Kirkus Reviews named The Poet X one of the best young adult books of the year.

Awards for The Poet X
Year	Award	Result	Ref.
2018	Boston Globe-Horn Book Award for Fiction & Poetry	Winner	
2018	Goodreads Choice Award for Poetry	Nominee	
2018	Kirkus Prize for Young Readers' Literature	Finalist	
2018	Los Angeles Times Book Prize for Young Adult Literature	Winner	
2018	National Book Award for Young People's Literature	Winner	
2018	New Atlantic Independent Booksellers Association (NAIBA) Book of the Year for Young Adult	Winner	
2019	Amelia Bloomer List	Top Ten	
2019	American Library Association's Amazing Audiobooks for Young Adults	Top Ten	
2019	American Library Association's Best Fiction for Young Adults	Top Ten	
2019	Association for Library Service to Children's Notable Children's Recordings	Selection	
2019	Association for Library Service to Children's Notable Children's Books	Selection	
2019	Carnegie Medal	Winner	
2019	Lambda Literary Award for Children's and Young Adult	Finalist	
2019	Michael L. Printz Award	Winner	
2019	Odyssey Award	Honor Book	
2019	Pura Belpré Award	Winner	
2019	Walter Dean Myers Award	Winner	
2019	YALSA's Quick Picks for Reluctant Young Adult Readers	Top Ten	
2020	Lincoln Award	Nominee	
2020	Rhode Island Teen Book Award	Nominee	

Awards
Preceded by Where the World Ends	Carnegie Medal recipient 2019	Succeeded by Lark
