= Bats at the Beach =

Book by Brian Lies

- Author: Brian Lies
- Publisher: Clarion Books
- Publication date: April 12, 2006
- ISBN: 978-0-61855744-8

Bats at the Beach is a 2006 picture book by Brian Lies. In the book, bats flock to the beach to spend a splendid moon-lit night on the sand and in the water, echoing what people do at the beach—but in a particularly batty way.

The message of the book is that bats are not bad. A portion of all copies sold went to Bat Conservation International.

== Reception ==
Bats at the Beach was a New York Times bestselling picture book.

It was read aloud on National Public Radio's Weekend Edition Saturday by host Scott Simon and writer Daniel Pinkwater on June 24, 2006. Pinkwater said, "Brilliant, brilliant paintings. . . just a whiz-bang summer book, anytime book. Everybody should look at this."

School Library Journal wrote: "Where the book truly soars is in the dark yet luminescent art, where bat wings glow in the light of the full moon and the sky is steely blue. The faces on the bats are furry and friendly. . . A grand adventure."

The book was reviewed by Chico Enterprise-Record. A Common Sense Media review called the book "delightful."

A Fredericksburg.com review said that the rhyming "may falter a bit, but the paintings are warm and humorous."
