= Dairy Queen (novel) =

2006 novel by Catherine Gilbert Murdock

- Author: Catherine Gilbert Murdock
- Language: English, German
- Publisher: Houghton Mifflin
- Publication date: May 22, 2006
- Pages: 278 (hardcover)
- ISBN: 0-618-68307-0
- Followed by: The Off Season

Dairy Queen is a 2006 novel written by Catherine Gilbert Murdock. In 2007, it was named the Best Book for Young Adults by the American Library Association.

The sequel is called The Off Season, and the next book is Front and Center.

== Plot summary ==
Fifteen-year-old girl Darlene Joyce (D.J.) Schwenk lives on a farm in fictional Red Bend, Wisconsin, where she and her family own a dairy farm. When D.J.'s father hurts his hip, leaving him unable to work, D.J. reluctantly leaves her high school's volleyball and basketball teams to fill in for him on the farm. In the process, she gives up her chance at a college scholarship, and her grades begin to slide. Meanwhile, D.J. is pressured into training Brian Nelson, a stubborn football player who plays for the rival Hawley High School team. Over time the two become friends, and D.J. develops romantic feelings for Brian.

Over the summer, D.J. begins training to join her high school's football team, driven in part by a fight with Brian, and in part by the legacy of her two estranged older brothers, Win and Bill, who are famous in Red Bend for playing college football. D.J. makes the team but is unsure of how to tell Brian, which later results in a falling-out between the two. D.J. is also alienated from her best friend, Amber, when she realizes too late that Amber is in love with her.

Throughout the summer, many of D.J.'s problems stem from an inability to discuss important issues with her family and friends, as Brian eventually points out to her. It is through their friendship that she finds she has a lot to talk about, and begins to put her life back together.
