= Brian Lies =

American author and illustrator

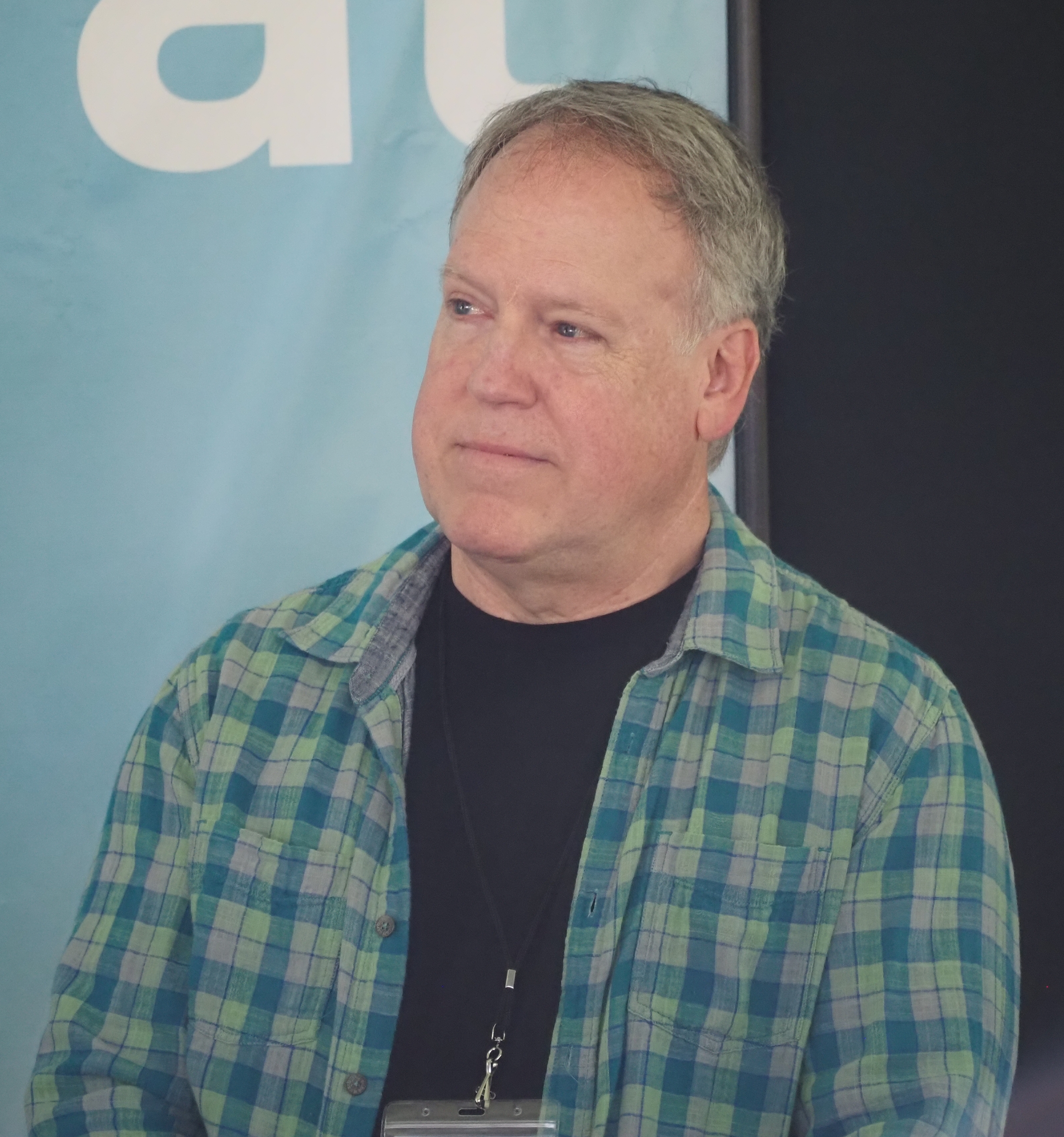
- Lies at the 2025 Gaithersburg Book Festival
- Born: 1963 (age 62–63); Princeton, New Jersey
- Education: Brown University; School of the Museum of Fine Arts at Tufts
- Occupations: Author and illustrator of children's books
- Notable work: The Rough Patch; Bats at the Beach

Brian Lies (pronounced Lees) (born 1963) is an American author and illustrator of children's books. His works include his 2019 Caldecott Honor-winning picture book The Rough Patch and his NY Times bestselling bat series, which includes Bats at the Beach, Bats at the Library, Bats at the Ballgame, and Bats in the Band.

He also illustrates for the children's magazines Spider, Ladybug, and Babybug.

== Early life ==
Lies was born in Princeton, New Jersey and now lives in eastern Massachusetts.

Lies was interested in art since childhood. While studying literature and psychology at Brown University, he made political cartoons for the student newspaper but was turned down when he applied for jobs at various publications. He then studied art at the School of the Museum of Fine Arts, Boston and eventually created political cartoons for major newspapers and magazines.

He had, however, long been interested in children's books, and when he was approached by Susan Sherman, who liked the way he portrayed emotions on his animal character's faces, he ended up illustrating the first book in the Flatfoot Fox series, written by Eth Clifford.

== Works ==
Bats at the Beach was read on NPR's "Weekend Edition Saturday" by Daniel Pinkwater, after which the book enjoyed a great deal of success, and leaving Houghton Mifflin to keep up with the sudden demand. It also landed a spot on Publishers Weekly's children's picture book bestseller list and was awarded an Oppenheim Toy Portfolio Gold Award. The story follows a group of bats, young and old, and their comical variations on such activities as sailing, surfing, putting on lotion, and roasting marshmallows. Matt Berman of Common Sense Media praised the book’s "simple and joyous concept" and noted the characters' gently rounded features. Lies stated that he tries to keep the design of his animal characters as naturalistic as possible despite their often human-like behavior. Lies got the idea from his daughter, who described a pattern of frost on the window as "a bat, with sea foam"; as Lies developed the idea, the verses came to him in a sudden inspiration. The acrylic paintings use a lot of blues and browns and are often bathed in moonlight though no moon is ever seen. The sequel, Bats at the Library, made it onto Time.com's Top 10 Children's Books of 2008 list, and the ABA announced that the book had been named Best New Picture Book in the 2009 Indies Choice Book Awards. In 2010, the book was awarded the 2010 Bill Martin, Jr. Picture Book Award (Kansas Reading Association).

Judith Constantinides, in a review for School Library Journal, said his acrylic paintings for Donna M. Bateman’s Deep in the Swamp are reminiscent of an Audubon painting. (The book also won a 2008 Southern Independent Booksellers Association Award.) Constantinides, in an earlier review for School Library Journal, praised Lies’ Hamlet and the Magnificent Sandcastle (which he wrote and illustrated) for its watercolor illustrations and the humorous details. The book is about an optimistic ("despite his namesake", as Constantinides notes) pig named Hamlet and his "pessimistic" porcupine friend Quince as they struggle to defend a giant sandcastle against the waves. Popcorn! by Elaine Landau was nominated for the 2006 Rhode Island Children's Book Award. and was also included in the Children's Agriculture Book series of Wisconsin Agriculture in the Classroom, which tries to select books that "hat accurately portray modern agriculture".

== Books written and illustrated by Brian Lies ==
- Cat Nap (2025) ISBN 978-0-06-267128-8
- The Rough Patch (2018) ISBN 978-0-06-267127-1
  - 2019 Caldecott Honor Book
- Got to Get to Bear's! (2018) ISBN 978-0-544-94882-2
- Gator Dad (2016) ISBN 978-0-544-53433-9
- Hamlet and the Enormous Chinese Dragon Kite (2001) ISBN 1-931659-01-X
- Hamlet and the Magnificent Sandcastle (1994) ISBN 0-9677929-2-4

=== Bats series ===
- Bats in the Band (2014) ISBN 978-0544105690
- Bats at the Ballgame (2010) ISBN 978-0-547-24970-4
- Bats at the Library (2008) ISBN 0-618-99923-X
- Bats at the Beach (2006) ISBN 0-618-55744-X

== Books illustrated by Brian Lies ==
- Malcolm at Midnight by W.H. Beck. ISBN 978-0547681009
- MORE by I.C. Springman. ISBN 978-0547610832
- Deep in the Swamp by Donna M. Bateman. (2007) ISBN 978-1-57091-596-3
- Finklehopper Frog Cheers by Irene Livingston (Tricycle Press, 2005) ISBN 1-58246-138-4
- Lucky Duck by Ellen Weiss (2004)
- Zoo Train by Lissa Rovetch
- Spy Hops and Belly Flops by Lynda Graham-Barber (2004) ISBN 0-618-22291-X
- Finklehopper Frog by Irene Livingston (2003) ISBN 1-58246-075-2 (also released in paperback with an audio cassette narrated by Steve Blane)
- Dinosaur Footprints (Reading Intervention for Early Success) (2003) ISBN 0-618-23769-0
- Dinosaurs (Reading Intervention for Early Success) by Adam Karlson. (2003) ISBN 0-618-23739-9
- Popcorn! by Elaine Landau. (2003) ISBN 1-57091-443-5
- See the Yak Yak by Charles Ghigna. (1999) ISBN 0-679-99135-2
- The Midnight Fridge by Bruce Glassman. (1998)
- Where are the Bears by Kay Winter. (1998)
- George and the Dragon Word by Dianne Snyder. (1991) ISBN 0-395-55129-3

=== Flatfoot Fox series ===
- Flatfoot Fox and the Case of the Missing Schoolhouse by Eth Clifford (1997) ISBN 0-395-81446-4
- Flatfoot Fox and the Case of the Bashful Beaver Written by Eth Clifford. (1995) ISBN 0-395-70560-6
- Flatfoot Fox and the Case of the Missing Whoooo Written by Eth Clifford (1992) ISBN 0-395-60289-0
- Flatfoot Fox and the Case of the Nosy Otter Written by Eth Clifford (1992) ISBN 0-395-60289-0
- Flatfoot Fox and the Case of the Missing Eye by Eth Clifford (1990) ISBN 0-395-51945-4
