= The Book of Essie =

Debut novel of American author Meghan MacLean Weir

- Author: Meghan MacLean Weir
- Cover artist: Sarah Toure (photograph); Abby Weintraub (design)
- Language: English
- Genre: Novel
- Published: 2018
- Publisher: Alfred A. Knopf
- Publication place: US
- Pages: 336
- ISBN: 978-0-525-52031-3

The Book of Essie is the 2018 debut novel of American author Meghan MacLean Weir. It features a 17-year-old named Essie Hicks who is pregnant. To avoid embarrassing her conservative Christian family who are stars of a reality television show, Essie's mother arranges for her to hastily marry an acquaintance of hers from school.

== Plot ==
Esther "Essie" Anne Hicks becomes pregnant shortly before turning 17, which is problematic as she is the daughter of a charismatic pastor. The pastor and his family are the subject of a reality television show "Six for Hicks"—Essie has thus spent much of her life in the public eye. Essie's mother Celia decides that the best solution for the pregnancy so as not to harm their reputation would be for Essie to get married immediately. Though she does not have a boyfriend, Essie subtly influences her mother to suggest she marry Roarke Richards, a fellow teenager whose family is experiencing financial difficulties, yet who has aspirations to attend Columbia University. Celia offers Roarke and his family hundreds of thousands of dollars for him to marry Essie.

The identity of the baby's father is not known to the reader for much of the novel, though it is eventually revealed that Essie's brother Caleb repeatedly raped her from age twelve and impregnated her. Roarke and Essie marry; with the money they gained from Essie's parents in exchange for doing so, Essie gains financial freedom. After wavering whether or not to do so, Essie decides to release a memoir of her diaries, detailing the abuse she experienced and exposing her family for covering it up.

The book is told in first-person perspective through three characters: Essie Hicks, Roarke Richards, and Liberty Bell, a cult survivor-turned-reporter.

== Characters ==
- Esther "Essie" Hicks: the youngest child of the Hicks family (17) who gets pregnant.
- Roarke Richards: The teenager Essie's mother arranges for her to marry
- Liberty Bell: former hyperconservative teen-blogger turned reporter whom Essie enlists to help her release her side of the story to the public
- Celia Richards: Essie's calculating mother
- Caleb Hicks: Essie's older brother who raped her and her sister

== Themes ==
In showing the Hicks' disparate treatment of their sons and daughters, the novel "asks that we look at the burdens we expect daughters to bear, and the free passes we give to sons". It also examines the American cultural obsession with celebrities and reality television.

== Reception ==
With its conservative Christian family featured on reality television, the novel has been described as "a mashup of the Kardashians and the Duggars". Claire Hopley of The Washington Times noted that despite the novel's busy plot and three narrators, the novel does not get confusing and remains readable, "a testament to author Meghan Weir’s firm hand on the tiller of her plot". Kirkus Reviews called the novel "sensitive if not particularly subtle", with "genuine emotional punch". Publishers Weekly noted that some characters are finely nuanced, though "its villains lack dimension".

=== Awards and nominations ===
The Book of Essie received the following accolades:

- American Library Association Alex Award (2019)
- Goodreads Choice Award Nominee for Fiction (2018)
