= Oge Mora =

American children's book illustrator and author

- Education: Rhode Island School of Design
- Occupations: Author, illustrator
- Writing career
- Genre: Children's books
- Notable work: Thank You, Omu!
- Notable awards: Caldecott Honor 2019 Thank You, Omu!; John Steptoe Award for New Talent 2019 Thank You, Omu!; Ezra Jack Keats Book Award 2019 Thank You, Omu!

Oge Mora is a children's book illustrator and author living in Providence, Rhode Island. She received a Caldecott Honor, Coretta Scott King John Steptoe Award for New Talent, and Ezra Jack Keats Book Award in 2019 for her book, Thank You, Omu!.

Her parents emigrated from Nigeria to Columbus, Ohio. Mora attended the Rhode Island School of Design (RISD). While taking a class called "Picture and Word" at RISD, she created a picture book mock-up, titled Omu's Stew for her final project. The teacher invited editors and art directors to see the final work and Mora's draft was picked up by publisher Little, Brown and Company and published as Thank You, Omu!.

Her illustrations are created with cut paper, paint, and china markers.

== Works ==
=== Author and illustrator ===
- Thank You, Omu!, 2018
- Saturday, 2019

=== Illustrator ===
- Shaking Things Up: 14 Young Women Who Changed the World, 2018, contributing illustrator
- The Oldest Student: How Mary Walker Learned to Read, 2020
- Everybody in the Red Brick Building, October 2021
