= Breakfast with Buddha =

2007 novel by Roland Merullo

- Paperback version of the novel Breakfast with Buddha
- Author: Roland Merullo
- Cover artist: Henry Sene Yee, John Shireman
- Language: English
- Genre: Philosophical fiction Spiritual fiction
- Publication date: 10/02/2007 (Hardcover); 08/26/2008 (Paperback)
- Publication place: United States of America
- Media type: Print
- Pages: 336 (Paperback)
- ISBN: 1-56512-616-5 (Hardcover); 9781565126169 (Paperback)

Breakfast with Buddha is a 2007 spiritual conversion narrative novel by American author Roland Merullo. According to this story, Otto Ringling, an editor of food books who lives in New York and a skeptic, reluctantly goes onto a road trip with Volya Rinpoche, a Siberian monk. This story, narrated in the first person by Otto, describes Otto's thoughts and beliefs, his conversations with the Rinpoche, and how he gains new perspectives on the world as well as his life, as a result of Volya Rinpoche's company.

This book was well received in general, with readers awarding it 4 stars out of 5 on average on the Barnes & Noble website and an average of 4.6 stars out of 5 on the Borders website. It was also well received by book reviewers.

A sequel, Lunch with Buddha, was released in Fall 2012. Dinner with Buddha was published in 2015 and Dessert with Buddha in 2023.

== Plot ==
The entire story is narrated in first person by Otto Ringling. Otto is a 44-year-old American who lives in a suburb of New York City and is a senior editor at a Manhattan publishing house which specializes in books on food. He has a wife named Jeannie, a daughter named Natasha and a son named Anthony. He also has a dog, Jasper.

The story starts at a point when Otto's parents have been killed in a car crash in North Dakota. Otto wants to go to North Dakota to settle the estate, mainly for sentimental reasons. He therefore plans to drive from New York to North Dakota with his sister, Cecilia.

Cecilia Ringling is a tarot and palm reader who lives in Paterson, New Jersey. She is fascinated by the spiritual and mystic aspects of life to such an extent that Otto looks down upon her and believes her to be "as flaky as a good spanakopita crust". When Otto reaches her place, he finds her with a spiritual guru named Volya Rinpoche. She declares her intent to let Rinpoche have her share so that he may build a meditation retreat there, and implores Otto to take Rinpoche instead of her, to their parents' North Dakota farmhouse. Otto agrees reluctantly.

During the road trip, Otto is quite uncomfortable with Rinpoche, but still tries to make conversation with him. Once, while the two are conversing, Rinpoche advises him to "get off the fast road". Otto interprets this as philosophical or spiritual advice and decides not to heed it, but realizes what Rinpoche actually meant when they encounter heavy traffic on the highway due to a car crash. At first, the cause for the roadblock is not certain, and Otto goes through his habitual temper tantrums with himself. But he learns about the car crash later and feels sheepish. Amidst all this, Rinpoche remains cool and calm (as in the rest of the book).

They stay in an inn in Lititz, Pennsylvania. During breakfast, Rinpoche puts some soil in Otto's glass which was filled with water. He compares the water to the mind and says that evil acts make the mind dirty. If the mind is given some time, the dirt settles down, just like in water. Otto has not warmed up to this stranger as yet and is in a bad mood when the two leave the inn.

While driving, Otto starts seeing HERSHEY ATTRACTIONS signs. Being fascinated by American culture, he decides to take the monk to the Hershey's Chocolate Factory. Otto thinks that Rinpoche will be put off by the sights and sounds there and so, Otto has a "perverse urge" to show him what the American "reality" is. Rinpoche seems more excited that his photos from one of the rides were ready immediately, than on seeing all the candy in the stores. Otto buys him a bag of Hershey's Kisses.

While dining in a restaurant in Bedford, Pennsylvania, Rinpoche hands him a letter from Cecilia. Cecilia requests Otto to take Rinpoche to Youngstown, Ohio, where he needs to give a talk. The talk is to take place on the same evening, and they are far away from Youngstown. Rinpoche also says that he forgot to tell Otto. Because of this, Otto gets annoyed with Cecilia and Rinpoche.

During the talk, Otto asks Rinpoche, irreverently, why it is necessary to learn and try to improve if one is happy at the current situation. Rinpoche calmly suggests that Otto ponder over those questions himself and let him know the next morning. After the talk, Otto apologizes for his aggressive manner of questioning. Rinpoche assures him that his was the best question. That night, they stay in an inn in Chagrin Falls, Ohio.

Next morning, Otto tells Rinpoche that wanting to be accepted in society motivates people to do good instead of bad. Good people might also have a conscience.

During this stay, Otto starts seeing Rinpoche in a different light. He says, "... and one layer of foolishness [of Rinpoche] had magically evaporated... But I was beginning, just beginning, to sense something beneath the act, some force, some disguised dignity..."

While stopping for tea in Oberlin, Ohio, Otto buys a book written by Rinpoche, named The Greatest Pleasure without Rinpoche's knowledge. Later, when Otto asks Rinpoche which book of his he should read first, Rinpoche replies, "For an advanced soul like you, I think the best would be the one called The Greatest Pleasure".

Otto and Rinpoche spend the night in an inn in South Bend, Indiana for another talk by Rinpoche. When the two dine in a Thai restaurant, Rinpoche notices a man sitting at a table close to theirs, who was wearing earphones and talking to his young daughter. Rinpoche fails to notice the ear buds and thinks the man is talking to himself or to his dinner. Rinpoche struggles to contain his mirth and eventually runs outside onto the sidewalk, doubled up with laughter.

The duo learns that Rinpoche's talk has been postponed to the next morning, so they decide to go bowling. They get assigned to a bowling lane next to a boisterous group of men and women, who were all tattooed and who smoked and drank. While bowling, Rinpoche accidentally drops the ball in the group's direction. The group starts mocking Rinpoche. In return, Rinpoche places his hands on a man's shoulders and says some prayer. This has a calming effect on the surroundings. The groups stops cursing and play their game more quietly. While leaving, one of the men exclaims, "He's the real thing, man, ain't he?"

Next morning, he gets confronted by a nun in the question-and-answer session during a talk. Rinpoche maintains his composure throughout this episode, even though the nun seems displeased by his answers. The nun's resistance reminds Otto of himself.

The two of them attend a baseball game at Wrigley Field. During the game, amidst all the noise, Rinpoche falls asleep with a very peaceful expression, which captivates Otto. They then take a tour of Chicago.

== Interviews with the author ==
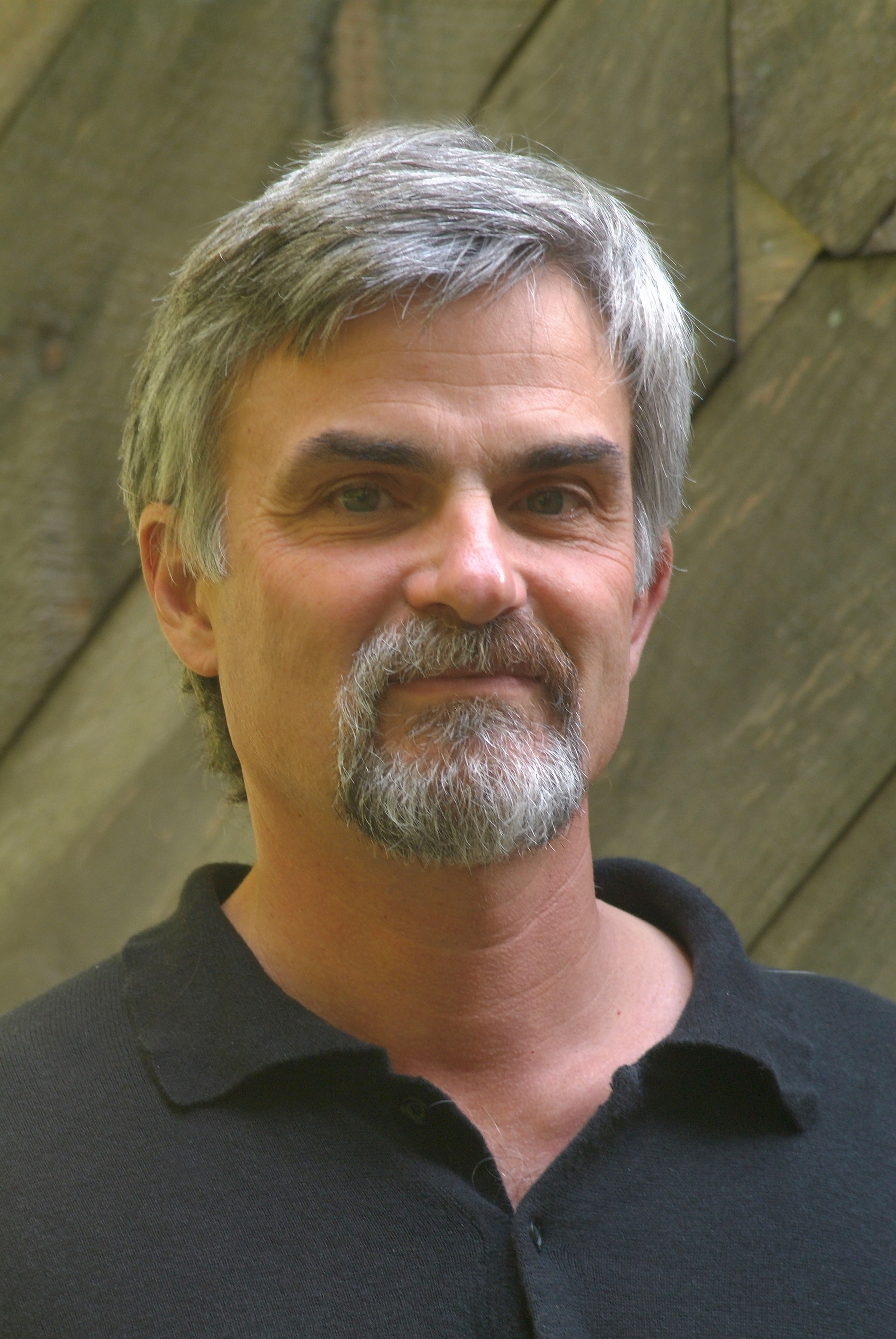
Roland Merullo

At the end of the book, there is a section which includes an interview with the author, Roland Merullo.

From his childhood, Merullo had been interested in questions such as "Why are we here?", "Why does evil exist?". He has read books on various religions and has gone on retreats based on Zen, Tibetan Buddhism, Christian, Quaker/solitary ideologies. He writes books not to preach, but to entertain and perhaps make people "think about things".

Merullo does not know what his future plans are, but does not plan to retire since he enjoys writing.

In another interview, one with Matthew M. Quick, he said, "I never start with an outline... I write novels by the seat of my pants, starting with a 'vision', by which I mean a very clear sense of an opening moment. He does feel that it is necessary that a writer should write every day, but a writer should definitely write regularly.

When he was asked what led him to write Golfing with God and Breakfast with Buddha, he said that he writes about things he cares about, and religion, loosely defined, is "high on that list". He and his wife are somewhere in between dogmatism and atheism and so, he tried to explore it in fiction. He also did so with a sense of humor.

He cites Dostoevsky, Tolstoy, Turgenev, Anita Shreve, Steven Cramer, among others, as writers who have influenced his work. However, he has been influenced more by individual books than by authors.

== Critical reception ==
The book generated favourable responses from reviewers. Publishers Weekly commented, "the whole book is breezy and affecting". Joanne Wilkinson wrote in the Booklist, "The skillful Merullo, using the lightest of touches, slowly turns this low-key comedy into a moving story of spiritual awakening." Kirkus Reviews said, "...Merullo has grown so persuasive over the course of two luminous little novels that readers might well follow him even if he turned next to, say, Mornings with Mohammed."

However, Josh Swiller, author of The Unheard: A Memoir of Deafness and Africa, wrote, "Though one can question Breakfast’s success as a novel, question its set up, or question some of its teachings, one can’t question the beautiful mood it leaves on you". A blogger on Boston Bibliophile, a book blog, was of the opinion that, "The only flaw I found was the sense I had about 7/8 of the way through that Otto's transformation came on a little quickly, but re-reading the beginning dispelled this impression a little or at least softened it with the sense that okay, yes, it's a believably ongoing process... charming, sweet, beautifully written book."
