= The Book of Boy =

Young adult historical fiction novel

- dustjacket of the 1st (hardcover) edition, illustrated by Ian Schoenherr
- Author: Catherine Gilbert Murdock
- Illustrator: Ian Schoenherr
- Set in: France and Italy, c.1350
- Publisher: Greenwillow Books (imprint of HarperCollins)
- Publication date: February 6, 2018
- Media type: hc, eBook
- Pages: 288
- Awards: Newbery Honor, 2018
- ISBN: 978-0-06-268620-6
- Website: www.catherinemurdock.com/book-of-boy.html

The Book of Boy is a young adult historical fiction novel written by Catherine Gilbert Murdock and published in February 2018. It recounts the journey of the eponymous Boy, who accompanies the pilgrim Secundus as they gather relics associated with Saint Peter. It was named a Newbery Honor book in January 2019.

== Plot summary ==
Boy is an orphan who works as a goatherd on the estate of Sir Jacques. He encounters the pilgrim Secundus in the fields and guides him to the manor, where Secundus convinces the Cook to lend him Boy as his servant on his pilgrimage to the nearest large town, Saint-Peter's-Step. As they leave for their journey, Secundus ties a mysterious bundle to Boy's hunchback and threatens him with death if he should peek inside or run away with it. During their first night together, Secundus reveals his quest to Boy; he is seeking seven relics from the body of Saint Peter: "Rib tooth thumb shin dust skull tomb". Based on that list, their journey will end in Rome, at the Mother of All the Churches.

The story is set in the holy year of 1350, while the Black Death was sweeping through Europe; before the novel begins, the wife and three children of Sir Jacques have succumbed to the plague. As an orphan and deformed with a hunchback, Boy has been bullied all his life and has a deep sense of shame over his otherness, although he is able to take comfort in his strange rapport with animals.

== Development ==
Murdock noted she was influenced by Susanna Clarke's Jonathan Strange & Mr Norrell, developing the dialogue to balance accuracy in historical vocabulary with readability for modern audiences.

=== Publishing history ===
- — (February 6, 2018). The Book of Boy (1st hc ed.). Greenwillow Books. ISBN 978-0-06-268620-6.
- — (February 6, 2018). The Book of Boy (1st eBook ed.). Greenwillow Books. ISBN 978-0-06-268622-0.
- — (August 2, 2018). The Book of Boy (UK ed.). Chicken House Books. ISBN 978-1911490579.

== Reception ==
In a starred review, Kirkus Reviews called it "a wickedly fun-filled quest that twists and turns with lyrical fire." Christopher Healy, reviewing for The New York Times, had mixed feelings about "the artistically ambiguous ending" which "gives no explicit answer to the question [of whether Boy should hide his true self]". The Horn Book gave the novel a star and in her review, Sarah Ellis wrote that Boy is "a complex and compelling being whose defining quality is goodness." In her review for School Library Journal, Elizabeth Bird also called Boy "the living embodiment of kindness and joy" and drew a contrast to the current state of children's literature: "We have a lot of dark, depressing, necessary books out there. Once, just once, let’s enjoy the one unafraid to let a little light and laughter in." Also, this book was featured in the 2019-20 Texas Lonestar Challenge, where fourth and fifth graders across the state read the book. The book was not well received among this cohort, confusing them will perplexing and concerning thematic topics

The American Library Association named The Book of Boy a Newbery Honor Book at its annual conference in January 2019.
