= Colorado Association of Libraries =

Professional association for librarians in Colorado

- Nickname: CAL
- Formation: 1893; 133 years ago
- Tax ID no.: 75-2995829
- Headquarters: Arvada, Colorado
- President: Ryan F. Buller
- Parent organization: American Library Association
- Website: cal-webs.org

The Colorado Association of Libraries (CAL) is a professional organization for Colorado's librarians and library workers. It is headquartered in Arvada, Colorado. It was established in 1893 as the Colorado Library Association. John Cotton Dana was elected president of the organization in 1895 but left after taking a controversial position on the gold standard and John Parsons succeeded him. The organization faltered in 1896 and then was "resuscitated" in 1905. Alfred Whitaker was the president of the association in 1905.

The organization has been registered as a state non-profit since 1968. The Colorado Association of Libraries was formed in 2001 through a merger of the Colorado Library Association and the Colorado Educational Media Association.

== Current status ==
Ryan F Buller of the University of Denver is the current CAL Executive Board President, with Tiah Frankish serving as President Elect. CAL members include librarians, library employees, public library trustees, education administrators, library service providers, library vendors, volunteers and library supporters, as well as institutions and corporations from public, school, academic and specialty libraries.

== See also ==
- List of libraries in the United States
