= The Rough Patch (book) =

2018 picture book

- Author: Brian Lies
- Genre: Children's book, picture book
- Publisher: Greenwillow Books/HarperCollins
- Publication date: August 14, 2018
- Pages: 40
- Awards: Caldecott Honor
- ISBN: 9780062671271
- OCLC: 999583844
- Website: http://brian-lies.squarespace.com/new-page-2

The Rough Patch is a 2018 picture book by Brian Lies. An idea of Lies' for more than ten years, when it was published it was well received and was named a 2019 Caldecott Honor book. The story tells of a fox named Evan whose dog dies. Evan then experiences various emotions while grieving before adopting a new dog at the end of the book. The book was praised for Lies' mixed media illustrations, in particular the way he used light and shadow.

== Development ==
Author and illustrator Brian Lies developed the concept in his sketchbook for more than a decade before he decided to turn it into a book. His breakthrough came when he decided that, "Rather than full bleeds throughout, there would be a number of vignettes and pages in which Evan would appear on a stark, white background." White space normally is uncomfortable for Lies, but he felt it important for this particular story. As part of his process, Lies starts with sketches, then does color studies, before doing his final illustrations. Through the development process Evan started as a human, before becoming a bear, a rhino, and finally a fox. Lies felt that a fox's physical characteristics and the lines of the animal would help him to express the character's range of emotions, while a character who was the age of a grandparent would make it harder for children to relate.

== Story ==
Evan, an anthropomorphic fox, does everything with his dog, including working on a garden they both love, until the dog dies one day. Evan buries the dog, shuts himself in his house, and becomes bitter, then angry, destroying the garden in this anger. When weeds grow in the garden, Evan tends these because if the "garden couldn't be a happy place, then it was going to be the saddest most desolate spot he could make it." However, when a pumpkin starts to grow, rather than destroy it Evan tends to it and it grows large enough for him to take it to the fair. At the fair, though still sad, he enjoys himself and reconnects with friends. Evan's pumpkin wins third prize and Evan, after first choosing a cash prize, decides to take a puppy home with him.

== Illustrations and text ==
Lies used acrylics, oils, and colored pencils in creating the book's illustrations. Evan's emotional state is conveyed not only through the text but through the illustrations, which both overtly and subtly displaying the fox's grief. Lies use of color and light also help to bring both the literal and emotional world to life, with the joyful colors and language at the beginning of the story subsumed in shadow after the death of the dog. The interplay between the text and illustrations through the book's layout was also noted.

The way Evan experiences death and processes his grief, which is never explicitly named in the book, is a major theme. The garden serves as a metaphor for Evan's emotional state, vibrant at the beginning, torn to pieces during his grief and rage, and hopeful when the pumpkin begins to grow. In the book emotions are portrayed, not as good or bad but simply what was felt. Through this process, Evan becomes ready to love again. Lies himself sees the book as one that is about hope.

== Awards and reception ==
The book was well reviewed, receiving starred reviews from Booklist, Publishers Weekly, which suggested that, "some sensitive readers may draw back from tragedy this stark, but others will be fascinated by Evan’s mysterious world" and School Library Journal, with librarian Rachel Zuffa praising, "this poignant picture book provides an exquisite depiction of grief and hope." Kirkus Reviews noted the, "charming illustrations." in a generally positive review.

In awarding it a Caldecott Honor, the award committee cited the book, "With compelling compositions and mastery of light and shadow, Brian Lies illustrates an emotional arc of loss, grief, healing, and hope." Lies knew the book was being discussed as a potential Caldecott book but had tried to not get his hopes up. Knowing that any call to tell him he'd won would come in early in the morning, he went to the gym mid-morning, leaving his phone in the car. He later tuned into the live stream of the event, not knowing that the committee had tried to contact him when he'd been at the gym. Lies was moved by the Caldecott recognition, "receiving this honor is deeply affecting... It’s a validation of the long years I’ve been trying to learn how to tell stories in pictures."
