= Catherine Gilbert Murdock =

American author (born 1966)

- Born: 1966 (age 59–60)
- Citizenship: American
- Education: Bryn Mawr College; University of Pennsylvania
- Occupation: Author
- Writing career
- Years active: 2006–present
- Genres: Young adult novels; non-fiction
- Website: www.catherinemurdock.com

Catherine Gilbert Murdock (born 1966) is an American author of children's books, young adult novels and non-fiction.

== Early life and education ==
Catherine Gilbert Murdock was born in Charleston, South Carolina in 1966. Her father was a chemical engineer, her mother a nurse. Along with her only sibling, novelist Elizabeth Gilbert, she grew up on a small family Christmas tree farm in Litchfield, Connecticut. The family lived in the country with no neighbors and had a very old TV. Consequently, they all read a great deal.

She attended Bryn Mawr College, where she studied Growth and Structure of Cities and graduated in 1988. In 1998, she earned a doctorate in American Civilization from the University of Pennsylvania.

== Career ==
Murdock's first published book was her dissertation from the University of Pennsylvania, published three years after she graduated as Domesticating Drink: Women, Men and Alcohol in Prohibition America. Her first young adult novel was Dairy Queen (2006), which was followed by two sequels: The Off Season (2007) and Front and Center (2009). Her 2013 book Heaven Is Paved with Oreos is set in the same world and features some of the same characters. Other books include Princess Ben: Being a Wholly Truthful Account of Her Various Discoveries and Misadventures, Recounted to the Best of Her Recollection, in Four Parts (2008), and Wisdom's Kiss: A Thrilling and Romantic Adventure, Incorporating Magic, Villainy and a Cat (2011). In 2018, she published a middle-grade novel called The Book of Boy, which was a Newbery Honor book.

In 2011 she appeared in and served as a program advisor for Prohibition on PBS.

== Personal life ==
She lives in Philadelphia with her husband and two children.

== Bibliography ==
Fiction

- Dairy Queen Series
  - Dairy Queen (2006)
  - The Off Season (2007)
  - Front and Center (2009)
  - Heaven is Paved with Oreos (2013) (spinoff)
- Princess Ben (2008)
- Wisdom’s Kiss (2011)
- The Book of Boy (2018)
- Da Vinci's Cat (2021)

Nonfiction

- Domesticating Drink: Women, Men and Alcohol in Prohibition America (1998)
