= Where the Mountain Meets the Moon =

2009 fantasy-adventure children's novel inspired by Chinese folklore

- First edition, with Newbery seal
- Author: Grace Lin
- Illustrator: Grace Lin
- Language: English
- Genre: Children's fantasy
- Publisher: Little, Brown and Company
- Publication date: 2009
- Publication place: United States
- Media type: Print
- Pages: 278
- Awards: Mythopoeic Fantasy Award for Children’s Literature; John Newbery Medal
- ISBN: 9780316114271
- OCLC: 672213061
- Followed by: Starry River of the Sky

Where the Mountain Meets the Moon is a fantasy-adventure children's novel inspired by Chinese folklore. It was written and illustrated by Grace Lin and published in 2009. The novel received a 2010 Newbery Honor and the 2010 Mythopoeic Fantasy Award for Children's Literature. It has been translated into Chinese, French, Hebrew, Romanian, Korean and Slovene.

== Plot ==
By a bare mountain, which the Jade River runs past, lies a poor, mud-covered village known as the Village of Fruitless Mountain, where the protagonist Minli lives. Minli is a young ten-year-old girl with a fast and eager spirit, and is constantly ready for adventure. However, what she especially enjoys are her father Ba's stories, which are often told at the dinner table. Minli's mother, Ma, despises the stories that Ba tells, feeling that they are simply "nonsense." She is full of bitterness and resentment due to their poverty.

The villagers, along with Minli's family, are very poor, as farming is difficult in the hard and dry land, because Fruitless Mountain is the broken and lonely heart of the immortal Jade Dragon, a dragon that once brought rain to the Earth. There is barely enough rice to feed the people there, and Minli begins to wish for good fortune.

Much to the displeasure of Ma, Minli spends her precious money on a goldfish. It turns out the goldfish can talk when people want to hear it. When she decides to let it go because of how bitter it makes Ma, the goldfish gives her directions to Never-Ending Mountain, where a wise immortal known as the Old Man of the Moon lives. According to the goldfish, the wise man can answer Minli's question of how to bring good fortune to her family and the village. The following day, Minli leaves the village to find him and change her family’s fortune. Her parents return home to find out she is gone, and frantically set off after her. They try to look for her, but are stopped by the goldfish seller, who tells them to trust Minli. Meanwhile, Minli sleeps for the night in the forest, only to wake up to find a trapped dragon, which she saves. They become friends, and Dragon offers to be her steed for the journey, despite the fact that he cannot fly like other dragons. Dragon also reveals that he was born from a painting and came to life when his eyes were painted.

Along the way, they encounter selfish monkeys, whom Minli manages to trick into letting them pass, and together they enter the City of Bright Moonlight, where Minli leaves Dragon in a cave and takes refuge in a boy's home. The boy is poor and has nothing but a buffalo but helps her find the king, who possesses a borrowed line of text, which is essential to finding the Old Man of the Moon. She ultimately meets the king, and he willingly gives up the borrowed line, which is revealed to be a page from the Book of Fortune, a legendary book that tells of fates and can be read only by immortal folk. Outside the city, Dragon also obtains a red string of destiny that is used to tie people destined to meet and marry together, which he believes is the borrowed line. The two then meet and after relating their adventures, set off once again, puzzled as to which is the real borrowed line.

Meanwhile, at the Village of Fruitless Mountain, Ba and Ma have decided to return home and wait for Minli, and during this time, Ma feels remorse for having been so discontent when she already had her own precious treasure: her daughter.

On the journey, Dragon tries to protect Minli from a poisonous Green Tiger but gets injured in the process and nearly dies. A set of twins from the village manage to trick the Green Tiger down an abandoned well, and Minli seeks help from a nearby village of Moon Rain, where the twins' grandfather, A-Gong, gives Dragon medicine in the form of tea. The next day take Minli and Dragon to Never-Ending Mountain, which is only a day's journey from the village. The twins explain that their village's name is due to raining seeds that fall from the moon every night, allowing flowering trees to bloom there. The blooms of the flowering trees also provide the antidote to the Green Tiger's poison, which has saved Dragon.

Using the borrowed line of text and the line of destiny, the adventurers stitch a kite that stretches into a bridge, and Minli goes on alone to meet the Old Man of the Moon. However, he informs her that she can ask only one question. After contemplating her choices, Minli chooses to ask Dragon's question for him: Why can he not fly? The old man instructs her to remove a rock from Dragon's head, which has been preventing him from flying. She does so, and immediately Dragon can fly. Together they fly home to Minli's village. The "rock" turns out to be the coveted Dragon's Pearl, which brings enormous wealth to her village. The Jade Dragon reunites with one of her children, Dragon, and transforms Fruitless Mountain to Fruitful Mountain. Because of Minli's sacrifice to help a friend, she and her family receive everything they could have ever hoped for.

== Reception ==
Jennifer Rothschild from School Library Journal stated in her review: "The author's writing is elegant, and her full-color illustrations are stunning."

Andrew Medlar from Booklist said: "Lin creates a strong, memorable heroine & mystical land [...] children will embrace this [...] story..."

== Sequels ==
A companion, titled Starry River of the Sky, was published on February 11, 2014. On August 20, 2015, Lin announced the sequel to the novel, titled When the Sea Turned to Silver. The new book was published on October 4, 2016.

== Theatrical performance ==
A stage adaptation based on Lin's book was performed at Wheelock Family Theater in Boston, in April 2014. The performance starred Caroline Workman as Minli, Michael Tow as Storyteller/ Minli's Ba, and was directed by Jane Staab.

A musical adaptation by Min Kahng was performed in 2026 by the San Diego Junior Theater.
