= Dreamers (children's book) =

2018 children's non-fiction book by Yuyi Morales

- Author: Yuyi Morales
- Illustrator: Yuyi Morales
- Genre: Children's Non-Fiction
- Published: 2018
- Publication place: United States
- Awards: Kirkus Prize for Young Children's Literature, California Reading Association Eureka! Silver Honor Book 2018, Bulletin Blue Ribbon Book Award 2018, Pura Belpre Illustrator Award 2019

Dreamers is a children's non-fiction book written and illustrated by Yuyi Morales. The book was first published on September 4, 2018 by Neal Porter books under Holiday House publishers. It chronicles Yuyi Morales' journey from Mexico to the United States with her young son, Kelly. Morales explores the importance of literacy and the function of libraries in society.

== Synopsis ==
Morales describes crossing a "bridge to the other side" at which point she and Kelly became immigrants. She describes the difficult transition period in which she was surrounded by an unfamiliar language and has trouble assimilating, which she referred to as making "mistakes." During this time she and Kelly discover a local library, where they learned the language and books became their "life."

== Main characters ==
Yuyi Morales is narrator and describes her experiences in first person. She references her son Kelly in both written and illustrated detail.

== Background ==
=== Significance of the Title ===
"Dreamers" is known as an executive order on immigration, but is explained by Morales as being less political and more descriptive of her and her son: "Kelly and I were Dreamers in the sense that all immigrants, regardless of our status, are Dreamers: we enter a new country carried by hopes and dreams, and carrying our own special gifts, to build a better future."

It was actually Morales' editor, Neal Porter, who suggested the title. Morales herself was hesitant, stating:

"I didn’t want to say that we are all dreamers because that weakens the fight for the Dreamers’ movement. At the same time, I wanted to signal that making the journey of leaving your country, all of the risk, all of the changes that you have to encounter in a new country, is the result of how we dream for a better future. We are dreamers because we come here hoping to do something better for ourselves and our children."

==== Immigration ====
Dreamers was in response to the political climate surrounding immigration to the United States. As Morales explained in the end pages of her book:

"How could children relate to my experience as an adult? Charlotte, my agent, had been insisting this was the time; it is right now, she insisted, when anybody who is an immigrant should be telling their story. Elections had happened, and the USA had elected a man who ran his campaign over the backs of immigrants, calling them words meant to take away their humanity. Neal, my editor, said, "We need your story now, Yuyi." But I was unsure that I could come up with the right words, in a story for children, to counteract the prejudice, discrimination, and hate exuding in the country."

=== End pages ===
After the book finishes, Morales takes an opportunity to repeat the story in a personal narrative form, expanding on the details of the broader plot she just finished presenting. She clarifies that that bridge connected Ciudad Juarez, Mexico, to El Paso, Texas, and they crossed when Kelly was two months old. She explains her reasoning for her migration, which was to marry her son's father and allow her son to meet her ill grandfather. Her mother-in-law introduced Morales and Kelly to the library where she relied on illustrations to convey they meaning of books. Morales and Kelly frequented the Western Addition Branch, Richmond Branch, Presidio Branch, Mission Branch, and the San Francisco Main Library.

== Reception ==
In a review for Teaching for Change's Social Justice Books website, Debbie Reese wrote that the book "is a celebration of what migrantes bring with them when they leave their homes. It's a story about family. And it's a story to remind us that we are all dreamers, bringing our own gifts wherever we roam. Beautiful and powerful at any time but given particular urgency as the status of our own Dreamers becomes uncertain, this is a story that is both topical and timeless".

=== Awards ===
- Kirkus Prize for Young Children's Literature
- California Reading Association Eureka! Silver Honor Book 2018
- Bulletin Blue Ribbon Book Award 2018
- Pura Belpre Illustrator Award 2019
