= Yuyi Morales =

Mexican-American author and illustrator (born 1968)

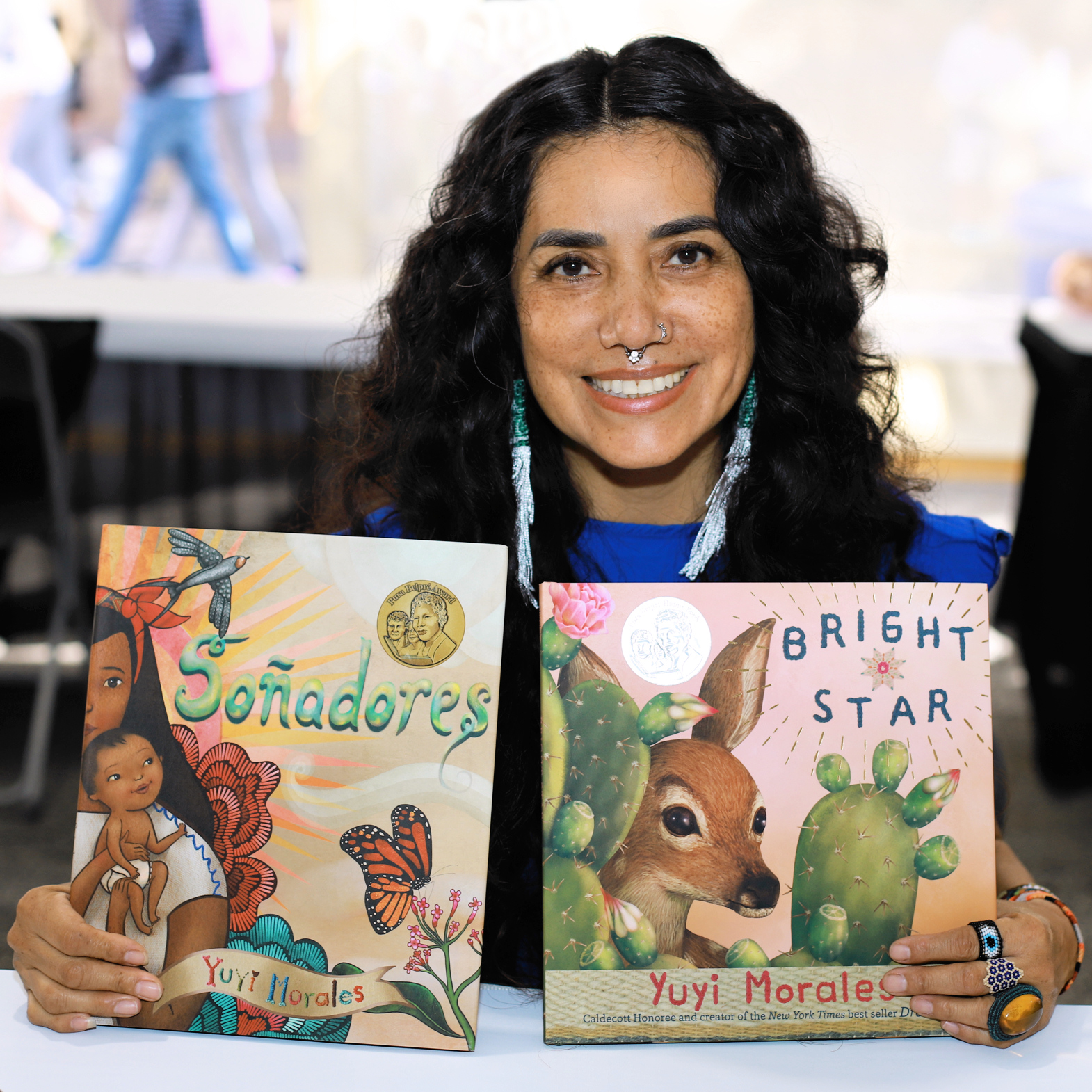
- Morales at the 2022 Texas Book Festival
- Born: November 7, 1968 (age 58); Xalapa, Veracruz
- Occupations: Author, Illustrator
- Writing career
- Period: c. 1997–present
- Genre: Children's fantasy,
- Website: yuyimorales.com

Yuyi Morales (born November 7, 1968) is a Mexican-American children's book author and illustrator. She is known for her books Just a Minute: A Trickster Tale and Counting Book, Little Night, and Viva Frida, which received the 2015 Pura Belpre Medal for illustration as well as a 2015 Caldecott Honor. Morales is the first Latina to receive a Caldecott Honor.

== Early life ==
Yuyi Morales was born in the city of Xalapa in the Mexican State of Veracruz in 1968. She is the oldest of four children. As a child she loved drawing, and often paired her pictures with stories. Her mother was a homemaker, and Morales has stated, "She made all our clothes, coats, hats, underwear. She made the bedspreads, the curtains, the lamps, everything". Despite those nights by the sewing machine, becoming an artist was not a childhood dream for Morales, commenting "That would have been thought of as crazy." Because she had been a top competitive swimmer in high school, she studied physical education at the Universidad de Xalapa, hoping to teach gym. After graduation, she took a job as a swim coach.

== Early career ==
While working as a swimming coach in Mexico, Morales met her husband, Tim, an American citizen, and had a son, Kelly. The new family moved to the United States in 1994. During her first years living in San Francisco, Morales remembers that she had no job, no friends and she barely spoke a few words in English. She was sad because she missed her native country and her family, Morales expresses that she felt like she did not fit in that country. One day her mother-in-law took her son Kelly to a public library in the city of San Francisco, she remembers she was so amazed and inspired by the section of children's books. Morales learned English by reading to her son, who did not know or care if she mispronounced some words, and she could always use the illustrations to show something she did not know. Morales felt so inspired by the vivid colors and illustrations from the books that she had been reading to her son that she wondered whether she could make picture books like those.

== Literary career ==
Morales bought a set of paints and brushes and enrolled in an extension class at UC Berkeley on writing for children where she met a group of other aspiring authors and illustrators. Morales's first English-language picture book project was Kathleen Krull's text for Harvesting Hope: The Story of Cesar Chavez in 2003. Reviewing Morales's work, School Library Journal contributor Sue Morgan praised her "beautifully rendered earth-tone illustrations," while Traci Todd, writing in Booklist, cited the book's "gorgeous paintings, with their rounded, organic forms and lush, gemstone hues." Morales's first self-illustrated title, Just a Minute, was published in 2003 as well. Morales kept illustrating original works like Niño Wrestles the World and Little Night Nochecita. She has also illustrated books for different authors like Georgia in Hawaii: When Georgia O'Keeffe Painted What She Pleased, Ladder to the Moon, Los Gatos Black en Halloween, My Abuelita, Sand Sister and Floating on Mama's song. She has influenced Cassandra Clare. Morales has since been recognized as one of the most celebrated Latina children’s book authors using her family’s legacy and heritage as inspiration.

== Awards and honors ==
- Americas Award for Children's and Young Adult Literature, sponsored by the national Consortium of Latin American Studies Programs (CLASP) (2003) for Just a Minute: A Trickster Tale and Counting Book.
- Northern California Book Award Nomination, Children's Literature (2003) for Just a Minute: A Trickster Tale and Counting Book.
- Pura Belpre Medal for Illustrator (2004) for Just a Minute: A Trickster Tale and Counting Book
- California Book Award Silver Medal for Juvenile Fiction (2004) for Just a Minute: A Trickster Tale and Counting Book
- Tomas Rivera Mexican American Children's Book Award (2004) for Just a Minute: A Trickster Tale and Counting Book
- Golden Kite Honor Book (2004) for Just a Minute: A Trickster Tale and Counting Book
- Latino Book Award (2004) for Just a Minute: A Trickster Tale and Counting Book
- Latino Literary Award for Best Children's Book (2004) for Just a Minute: A Trickster Tale and Counting Book
- Notable Books for Children, Younger Readers (2004) for Just a Minute: A Trickster Tale and Counting Book
- Notable Books for a Global Society (2004) for Just a Minute: A Trickster Tale and Counting Book
- Americas Award Honorable Mention (2003) for Harvesting Hope: The Story of Cesar Chavez
- School Library Journal Best Books (2003) for Harvesting Hope: The Story of Cesar Chavez
- San Francisco Chronicle Best of Year (2003) for Harvesting Hope: The Story of Cesar Chavez
- Lasting Connections, Best of the Year (2003) for Harvesting Hope: The Story of Cesar Chavez
- Book Links Magazine, Best of the Year (2003) for Harvesting Hope: The Story of Cesar Chavez
- Christopher Award (2004) for Harvesting Hope: The Story of Cesar Chavez
- Jane Addams Book Award (2004) for Harvesting Hope: The Story of Cesar Chavez
- Pura Belpre Honor for illustration (2004) for Harvesting Hope: The Story of Cesar Chavez
- The National Council for Social Studies (2004) for Harvesting Hope: The Story of Cesar Chavez
- Blue Bonnet Award Nomination (2004) for Harvesting Hope: The Story of Cesar Chavez
- ALA Notable Children's Book Selection (2007) for Little Night
- Pura Belpre Medal for Illustrator (2008) for Los Gatos Black on Halloween
- Pura Belpre Medal for Illustrator (2009) for Just In Case
- Pura Belpre Honor for Author (2009) for Just In Case
- Pura Belpre Honor for Illustrator (2010) for My Abuelita
- Pura Belpre Medal for Illustrator (2014) for Niño Wrestles the World
- Pura Belpre Medal for Illustrator (2015) for Viva Frida
- Caldecott Honor for Illustrator (2015) for Viva Frida
- Pura Belpre Medal for Illustrator (2019) for Dreamers / Soñadores

== Bibliography ==
=== As writer and illustrator ===
- Just a Minute!: A Trickster Tale and Counting Book, Chronicle Books (San Francisco, CA) 2003.
- Little Night, Roaring Brook Press (New Milford, CT) 2006.
- Just in Case: A Trickster Tale and Spanish Alphabet Book, Roaring Brook Press (New York, NY) 2008.
- Niño Wrestles the World, Roaring Brook Press (New York, NY) 2013.
- Viva Frida, Roaring Brook Press (New York, NY) 2014.
- Rudas: Niño's Horrendous Hermanitas, Roaring Brook Press (New York, NY) 2016.
- Dreamers/Soñadores, Holiday House Publishing (New York, NY) 2018.
- Bright Star/Lucero, Holiday House Publishing (New York, NY) 2021.
- Little Rebels, Neal Porter Books 2025.

=== As illustrator ===
- F. Isabel Campoy, Todas las buenas manos, Harcourt (San Diego, CA) 2002.
- Kathleen Krull, Harvesting Hope: The Story of Cesar Chavez, Harcourt (San Diego, CA) 2003.
- Amanda White, Sand Sister, Barefoot Books (Cambridge, MA) 2004.
- Marisa Montes, Los Gatos Black on Halloween, Holt (New York, NY) 2006.
- Tony Johnston, My Abuelita, Harcourt (Boston, MA) 2009.
- Laura Lacámara, Floating on Mama's Song/Flotando en la canción de mamá, Katherine Tegen Books (New York, NY) 2010.
- Maya Soetero-Ng, Ladder to the Moon, Candlewick Press (Somerville, MA) 2011.
- Amy Novesky, Georgia in Hawai'i: When Georgia O'keeffe Painted What She Pleased, Houghton Mifflin Harcourt (Boston, MA) 2012.
- Sherman Alexie, Thunder Boy Jr., Little Brown Books for Young Readers (New York, NY) 2016.
