= Roland Merullo =

American author (born 1953)

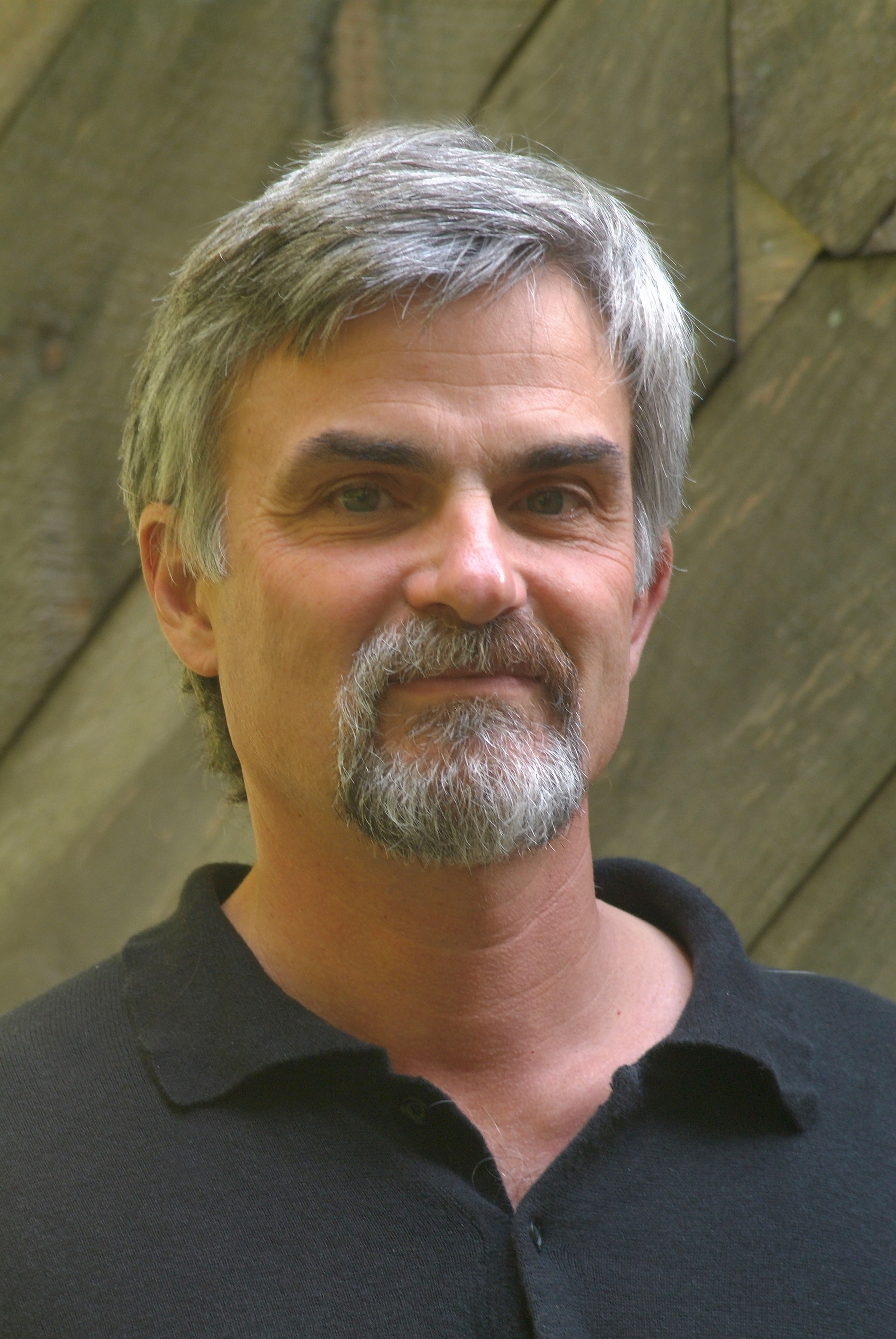
- Born: September 19, 1953 (age 72); Boston, Massachusetts, U.S.
- Education: Phillips Exeter Academy; Boston University; Brown University (BA, MA)
- Occupations: Novelist; essayist; memoirist
- Writing career
- Period: 1980–present
- Genres: fiction, memoir, essay
- Literary movement: popular, literary, spiritual

Roland Merullo (born September 19, 1953) is an American author who writes novels, essays and memoir. His best-known works are the novels Breakfast with Buddha, In Revere, In Those Days, A Little Love Story, Revere Beach Boulevard and the memoir Revere Beach Elegy. His books have been translated into Spanish, Portuguese, Korean, German, Chinese, Turkish, Bulgarian, Croatian, Slovenian, Czech and Italian.

== Early life ==
Merullo was born in Boston and raised in Revere, Massachusetts. His father, Roland (Orlando) was a civil engineer who worked for state government and was named personnel secretary by Christian Herter, governor of Massachusetts. He attended Suffolk Law School, passed the Bar at the age of sixty and became an attorney. Eileen, his mother, was a physical therapist who worked at Walter Reed Army Hospital with amputees injured in the Pacific Theatre of World War II. Later, she became a science teacher and taught at the middle school level for 25 years. He has two brothers, Steve and Ken.

Merullo earned his high school degree from Phillips Exeter Academy. After having initially enrolled as an undergraduate at Boston University, he received a B.A. and an M.A. (in Russian Language and Literature) from Brown University. Merullo spent time in Micronesia during a stint with the Peace Corps, worked in the former Soviet Union for the United States Information Agency and was employed as a cab driver and carpenter. He taught creative writing at Bennington College and Amherst College, and was a writer in residence at Miami Dade Colleges and North Shore Community College. He met Amanda Stearns, a photographer, while enrolled at Brown. They began dating in 1978 and were married in the fall of 1979. After living in Vermont for several years, the couple settled in western Massachusetts. They have two daughters: Alexandra and Juliana.

His first published essays appeared in the early 1980s. They include a piece on solitude featured in The Rosicrucian Digest and a humorous "My Turn" column for Newsweek.

== Later life and works ==
Leaving Losapas, Merullo's first novel, was published by Houghton Mifflin in 1991 and named a B. Dalton Discovery Series Choice. Publishers Weekly called his second book A Russian Requiem "...smoothly written and multifaceted, solidly depicting the isolation and poverty of a city far removed from Moscow and insightfully exploring the psyches of individuals caught in the conflicts between their ideals and their careers..."

The works Revere Beach Boulevard, In Revere, In Those Days, and Revere Beach Elegy, are often referred to as the Revere Beach trilogy. Of In Revere, In Those Days David Shribman of the Boston Globe wrote "...The details are just right, and the result is a portrait of a time and a place and a state of mind that has few equals.This is a story that is true to life because it is about life itself, the tragedies and trials and travails, and even the triumphs, momentary and meaningless as they sometimes seem. This is a Boston story for the ages..." PBS correspondent Ray Suarez said "...I've never met Roland Merullo, or even read anything he's written before now. Yet today I feel as if I've known him my whole life. . . . At the close of Elegy, the reader is comfortably walking alongside a man who has grown into himself, accepted and embraced his past..."

A Little Love Story was published in 2005. It is a tale about a woman with cystic fibrosis that "tinkers with traditional formula, the lovers are neither innocent nor naïve, nor completely helpless in the face of their impossible barrier to produce a love story for the 21st century..." This novel "circumscribes a dramatic arc that takes in 9/11, media saturation, lecherous men in politics, ethnic family stereotypes, adult-onset dementia, and terminal illness in the relatively young. This is an utterly charming, beautifully told, completely affecting story that is one part love story, one part medical thriller..."

Merullo's early works have been termed thoughtful and reflective. "I think I am a person who cares about the emotional life of people...and so I spend a lot of time on the emotional experiences of my characters—rather than, say, their intellectual experiences," he once said. But, Golfing with God, Breakfast with Buddha and American Savior exhibited a more overtly spiritual theme – albeit humorous in tone. The seeds of this thematic shift can perhaps be traced to A Little Love Story. However, in the fall of 2008, Merullo surprised many with the release of Fidel’s Last Days, his first thriller. Merullo has addressed these changes saying, "...I've had editors counsel me to write the same book over and over, and some readers who complained that I haven’t kept writing books set in greater Boston. But it would be like trying to keep a migratory bird in your backyard. I just want to go places, to see things, to observe the human predicament in different forms... Like most novelists, I have a peculiar fascination with the way people behave and the psychological roots of, or reasons for, their behavior..."

In the past, film options had been secured for the novels Leaving Losapas and Revere Beach Boulevard. GemFilms of Gloucester, Massachusetts currently holds an option for Golfing with God.

In late 2012, Merullo released the sequel Lunch with Buddha. In a starred review, Kirkus Magazine called it "a beautifully written and compelling story about a man's search for meaning that earnestly and accessibly tackles some well-trodden but universal questions. A quiet meditation on life, death, darkness and spirituality, sprinkled with humor, tenderness and stunning landscapes." Vatican Waltz was released in 2013 and a Publishers Weekly starred review stated that the novel "sings with finely observed details of family relationships, ethnic neighborhood life, and the life of prayer." In a 2015 starred review of Dinner with Buddha, Kirkus Magazine said "With six unconventionally religious novels to date, this brave, meditative author has carved a unique niche in American literature." The Delight of Being Ordinary was released in 2017 and Publishers Weekly called it “a thoughtful, compassionate, and mature work, a 'Christian- Buddhist-agnostic prayer' to the world, and readers will find a pleasant surprise in its conclusion." Of From These Broken Streets, a novel released in late 2020, Kirkus Magazine said, "This multifaceted writer always surprises and entertains. He finds time among the mayhem for a few poignant human dramas, brought to satisfactory conclusions along with the uprising. Stirring and moving: more fine work from a versatile, gifted writer."

Driving Jesus to Little Rock was released in August 2021. Kirkus wrote "Merullo is a long-standing, practiced hand at crafting narratives that are both hugely readable and genuinely thought-provoking, and the story of the growing relationship between his stand-in and So-Called Jesus makes for deeply captivating reading. …Readers get a refreshingly complex, personal portrait of that promised "new Jesus"—wry, funny, knowing, and infinitely patient. ...Even non-Christians will find this road trip intriguing. A winningly thoughtful, metafictional exploration of the modern nature of Christianity."

Merullo has won the Massachusetts Book Award for non fiction and the Maria Thomas Fiction Prize. He has been a Booklist Editor's Choice recipient and was among the finalists for a PEN New England/Winship Prize. In 2009, Breakfast with Buddha was nominated for the International Dublin Literary Award and American Savior was chosen as an Honor Book in Fiction at the Massachusetts Book Awards. On June 14, 2009, Revere Beach Boulevard was named one of New England's top 100 essential books by The Boston Globe. The Talk-Funny Girl was a 2012 Alex Award Winner.

== Bibliography ==
=== Novels ===
- Leaving Losapas (1991)
- A Russian Requiem (1993)
- Revere Beach Boulevard (1998)
- In Revere, In Those Days (2002)
- A Little Love Story (2005)
- Golfing with God (2005)
- Breakfast with Buddha (2007)
- American Savior (2008)
- Fidel's Last Days (2008)
- The Talk-Funny Girl (2011)
- Lunch with Buddha (2012)
- Vatican Waltz (2013)
- The Return (2014)
- Dinner with Buddha (2015)
- The Delight of Being Ordinary (2017)
- Once Night Falls (2019)
- From These Broken Streets (2020)
- Driving Jesus to Little Rock (2021)
- A Harvest of Secrets (2022)
- Dessert with Buddha (2023)
- The Light Over Lake Como (2024)

=== Novellas ===
- Rinpoche's Remarkable Ten-Week Weight Loss Clinic (2016)

=== Non Fiction and Memoir ===
- Passion for Golf (2000)
- Revere Beach Elegy (2002)
- The Italian Summer: Golf, Food and Family at Lake Como (2009)
- Demons of the Blank Page: 15 Obstacles That Keep You From Writing & How To Conquer Them (2011)
- Taking the Kids to Italy (2013)
- The Ten Commandments of Golf Etiquette: How to Make the Game More Enjoyable for Yourself and for Everyone Else on the Course (2015)
- Moments of Grace and Beauty: Forty Stories of Kindness, Courage, and Generosity in a Troubled World (2019)
- The Eight Visits (2026)

=== Serialized Novellas ===
- The Boston Tangler (1999)
- The Addition (2001)

=== Short stories ===
- "Last Call" (2011)

=== Audio Books ===
- Fidel's Last Days (2008)
- Breakfast with Buddha (2011)
- "What A Father Leaves" (2012)
- Vatican Waltz (2013)
- Lunch with Buddha (2015)
- Dinner with Buddha (2015)
- The Delight of Being Ordinary (2017)
- The Talk-Funny Girl (2017)
- Once Night Falls (2019)
- From These Broken Streets (2020)
- American Savior (2020)
- A Harvest of Secrets (2022)
- Dessert with Buddha (2023)
- Rinpoche's Remarkable Ten-Week Weight Loss Clinic (2023)
- The Light Over Lake Como (2024)

=== As contributor or editor ===
- Garden Court (Temple University Press 1997)
- Our Fathers: Reflections by Sons (Beacon Press 2002)
- The Italians (Greenhaven Press 2005)
- Cystic Fibrosis (Greenhaven Press 2009)
- Boston: Voices and Visions (University of Massachusetts Press 2010)
- Northshire Bookstore: Inspiration for Every Age (Shires Press 2016)
