= Grace Lin =

American children's writer and illustrator (born 1974)

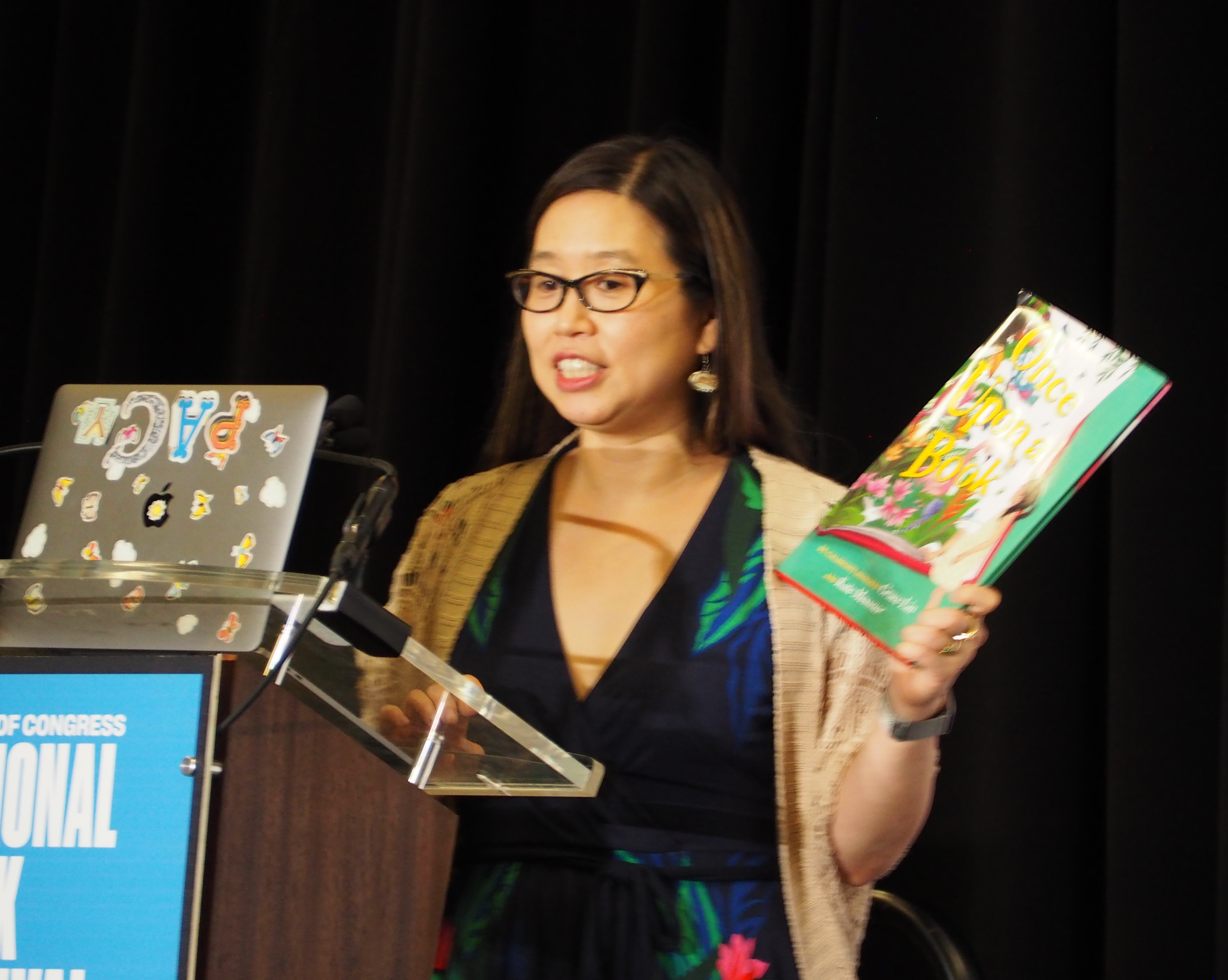
- Born: May 17, 1974 (age 52); New Hartford, New York, U.S.
- Education: Rhode Island School of Design (BFA)
- Occupations: Author; illustrator
- Spouses: Robert Mercer (m. 2001; died 2007) Alex Ferron (m. 2010)
- Children: 1
- Writing career
- Notable awards: Newbery Honor Award (2010); National Book Award Finalist (2016); Caldecott Honor Award (2019); Children's Literature Legacy Award (2022)

Grace Lin (Chinese: 林珮思; born May 17, 1974) is a Taiwanese-American children's writer and illustrator. She is a Newbery, Geisel, and Caldecott honoree, known for contributing to and advocating for Asian American representation and diversity in children’s literature. She has published more than 25 books, all of which are written for young and middle-grade audiences. Much of her work features young Asian and Asian American characters in both everyday and fantastical settings.

== Early life and education ==
Lin was born in 1974 to a Taiwanese American family in New Hartford, New York. Her parents are Jer-Shang Lin, a doctor, and Lin-Lin Lin, a botanist. She grew up in upstate New York, where she and her two sisters, Beatrice and Alice, were the only Asian students at their elementary school. Lin started creating books during her childhood, and in seventh grade, she entered a national book contest for students, winning fourth place and $1000.

She later attended the Rhode Island School of Design, graduating in 1996 with a Bachelor of Fine Arts (B.F.A.) in children's book illustration.

== Career ==
=== Writing and illustration ===
After graduating from RISD and failing to garner attention from publishers, Lin worked for a giftware company, where she designed t-shirts and mugs. After a couple of years, she got laid off from that job and decided to pursue her dream of being a children’s book author and illustrator. A senior editor from Charlesbridge Publishing contacted Lin after taking notice of her illustration samples, inquiring if she had a story to go along with these illustrations. At the time, Lin did not have a story ready, but told the editor that she did. Eventually, she created a corresponding story for these samples, ultimately publishing her first book, The Ugly Vegetables, in 1999. She has since published more than 25 books, many of which she illustrated herself. Lin continues to write and illustrate. Some of her work is housed in the University of Connecticut archives.

=== Other work ===
In 2016, Lin gave a TEDx presentation entitled "The Windows and Mirrors of Your Child’s Bookshelf," in which she advocates for increased awareness of diversity in children’s books. Since 2017, Lin has written nine commentaries for the New England Public Radio, most often writing about her personal experiences as a parent and Asian American author. In 2017 and 2018, she appeared on PBS NewsHour, speaking on representations of race and culture in children’s literature. Lin hosts two podcasts, Book Friends Forever and Kids Ask Authors, started in 2019 and 2020 respectively. She also sits on the advisory committee of We Need Diverse Books, a non-profit organization that promotes diversity in children's literature.

== Personal life ==
She married Robert Mercer, an architect and fellow RISD alum, in 2001. When he was diagnosed with Ewing's sarcoma, a rare type of cancer, he and Lin moved to Montreal created the fundraiser Robert’s Snow: For Cancer’s Cure based on Lin’s children’s book, Robert’s Snow. Lin and Mercer invited children’s book illustrators to paint wooden snowflakes ornaments which were then auctioned off to raise money for cancer research. The fundraiser auction was held twice, raising over $100,000. Upon Mercer’s death in 2007, the fundraiser was discontinued. She remarried in 2010 to Alexandre Ferron, with whom she has a daughter, Hazel, born in 2012. Lin resides in Florence, Massachusetts with her family.

== Style and themes ==
=== Themes ===
Lin often writes about cultural and racial identity, as well as peace and relationships between friends and family. Many of Lin’s works revolve around the experiences of Asian and Asian American characters, and she often draws directly from her own personal experiences, particularly in her Pacy series. By featuring Asian American protagonists in everyday situations and emphasizing diversity within the Asian American experience, argues Duke University Professor Susan Thananopavarn, Lin’s books confront and subvert both Western and global stereotypes surrounding the AAPI community. She also incorporates elements from traditional Chinese and Taiwanese fantasy folktales, which are most evident in her Where the Mountain Meets the Moon series.

=== Illustration style ===
Lin’s illustration style uses bright colors, graphic shapes, and intricate, layered patterns. Lin illustrates all her work by hand, with a preference for gouache. Lin developed her current illustration style during her senior year at RISD. Lin has noted that her inspiration stems from a combination of traditional Chinese folk art and the work of European artists such as Matisse and Van Gogh.

== Awards and reception ==
Lin has won multiple literary awards for her work, including a Newbery Honor for Where the Mountain Meets the Moon in 2010, a Theodor Seuss Geisel award for Ling and Ting: Not Exactly the Same! in 2011, a National Book Award finalist for When the Sea Turned Silver in 2016, and a Caldecott Honor for A Big Mooncake for Little Star in 2019. Many of her books have received starred reviews from outlets such as Publishers Weekly, Kirkus Reviews, School Library Journal, and Horn Book Magazine, and she has been nominated for numerous awards throughout her career. In 2016, she was recognized as one of ten Champions of Change for AAPI Art and Storytelling by the Obama administration, and her art was shown in the White House. Furthermore, in recognition of her "significant and lasting contribution to literature for children," Lin won the 2022 Children's Literature Legacy Award. As the illustrator for I Am an American: The Wong Kim Ark Story, she won the Carter G. Woodson Book Award (Elementary Level) in 2022. In 2024, she won the Picture Book/Early Reader Award at the 24th annual Massachusetts Book Awards.

== List of works ==
=== Author and illustrator ===
==== Pacy series ====
- The Year of the Dog, Little, Brown (New York, NY), 2006. ISBN 978-0-316-06002-8
- The Year of the Rat, Little, Brown (New York, NY), 2007. ISBN 978-0-316-02928-5
- Dumpling Days, 2012. ISBN 978-0-316-12589-5

==== Where the Mountain Meets the Moon series ====
- Where the Mountain Meets the Moon, BOOK 1 Little, Brown Books for Young Readers, 2009. ISBN 978-0-316-03863-8
- Starry River of the Sky, BOOK 2 2012. ISBN 978-0-316-12595-6
- When the Sea Turned to Silver, BOOK 3 Little, Brown (New York, NY), 2016. ISBN 978-0-316-12594-9

==== Ling & Ting series ====
- Ling & Ting: Not Exactly the Same!, Little, Brown (New York, NY), 2010. ISBN 978-0-316-02453-2
- Ling & Ting Share a Birthday, Little, Brown (New York, NY), 2013. ISBN 978-0-316-18404-5
- Ling & Ting: Twice as Silly, Little, Brown (New York, NY), 2014. ISBN 978-0-316-18402-1
- Ling & Ting: Together in All Weather, Little, Brown (New York, NY), 2015. ISBN 978-0-316-33549-2

==== Other works ====
- The Ugly Vegetables, Charlesbridge (Watertown, MA), 1999. ISBN 978-0-88106-336-3
- Okie-dokie, Artichokie!, Viking (New York, NY), 2003. ISBN 978-0-670-03623-3
- Olvina Flies, Henry Holt (New York, NY), 2003. ISBN 978-0-8050-6711-8
- Robert's Snow, Penguin (New York, NY), 2004. ISBN 978-0-670-05911-9
- Jingle Bells, Little, Brown (New York, NY), 2004. ISBN 978-0-316-79494-7
- Fortune Cookie Fortunes, Alfred A. Knopf (New York, NY), 2004. ISBN 978-0-440-42192-4
- Deck the Halls, Little, Brown (New York, NY), 2004. ISBN 978-0-316-79493-0
- The Twelve Days of Christmas, Little, Brown (New York, NY), 2004. ISBN 978-0-316-79496-1
- Merry Christmas! Let's All Sing!, Little, Brown (New York, NY), 2005. ISBN 978-0-316-79490-9
- Olvina Swims, Macmillan, 2007, ISBN 978-0-8050-7661-5
- Our Seasons, Charlesbridge (Watertown, MA), 2006. ISBN 978-1-57091-360-0
- The Red Thread: An Adoption Fairy Tale, Albert Whitman and Company, 2007, ISBN 978-0-8075-6922-1
- Bringing in the New Year, Alfred A. Knopf, 2008, ISBN 978-0-375-83745-6
- Thanking the Moon: Celebrating the Mid-Autumn Moon Festival, Alfred A. Knopf, 2010, ISBN 978-0-375-86101-7
- A Big Mooncake for Little Star, Little, Brown, 2018, ISBN 978-0-316-40448-8
- Mulan: Before the Sword, Disney Press, 2020, ISBN 978-1-368-02033-6
- The Gate, the Girl, and the Dragon, 2025, ISBN 978-0316594684

=== Illustrator ===
- Roseanne Thong, Round is a Mooncake: A Book of Shapes, Chronicle Books (San Francisco, CA), 2000. ISBN 978-0-8118-2676-1
- Paul Yee, The Jade Necklace, Crocodile Books (New York, NY), 2001. ISBN 978-1-896580-07-4
- Dim Sum for Everyone!, Alfred A. Knopf (New York, NY), 2001. ISBN 978-0-375-91082-1
- Roseanne Thong, Red is a Dragon: A Book of Colors, Chronicle Books (San Francisco, CA), 2001. ISBN 978-0-8118-6481-7
- Dana Meachen Rau, My Favorite Foods, Compass Point Books (Minneapolis, MN), 2001. ISBN 978-0-7565-0076-4
- Frances Park and Ginger Park, Where on Earth Is My Bagel?, Lee & Low (New York, NY), 2001. ISBN 978-1-58430-033-5
- Cari Meister, A New Roof, Children's Press (New York, NY), 2002. ISBN 978-0-516-22369-8
- Kite Flying, Alfred A. Knopf (New York, NY), 2002. ISBN 978-0-375-81520-1
- C.C. Cameron, One for Me, One for You: Little Ideas for Caring for Yourself and the World, Roaring Brook Press (Brookfield, CT), 2003. ISBN 978-1-250-27557-8
- Kathy Tucker, The Seven Chinese Sisters, Albert Whitman (Morton Grove, IL), 2003. ISBN 978-0-8075-7310-5
- Roseanne Thong, One is a Drummer: A Book of Numbers, Chronicle Books (San Francisco, CA), 2004. ISBN 978-0-8118-3772-9
- Eleanor Roosevelt and Michelle Markel, When You Grow Up to Vote: How Our Government Works for You, Roaring Brook Press (Brookfield, CT), 2018. ISBN 978-1-62672-879-0
- Martha Brockenbrough, I Am an American: The Wong Kim Ark Story, Little, Brown Books for Young Readers, 2021. ISBN 9780316426923.
