= E. B. White Read Aloud Award =

Literary award

- Awarded for: "universal appeal as 'terrific' books to read aloud"
- Country: United States
- Presented by: ABC Children’s Group division of the American Booksellers Association
- First award: 2004; 22 years ago
- Final award: 2019; 7 years ago
- Website: www.bookweb.org/membership/ABC/EBWhitewinners

The E. B. White Read Aloud Award was an annual award and ceremony by The Association of Booksellers for Children (ABC) that ran from 2004-2019 . The award was created to honor books that its membership felt embodied the universal read aloud standards that were created by the work of the author E. B. White.

In 2006 the award was expanded into two categories:

- the E. B. White Read Aloud Award for Picture Books
- the E. B. White Read Aloud Award for Older Readers.

Titles were nominated for the award by ABC booksellers, and then the final decision was made by a committee of booksellers that met annually in February. The awards were publicly announced, and the official presentation took place, during a children's dinner at BookExpo America. They were announced in conjunction with Indies Choice Book Awards. The award was last given in 2019, the final year that BookExpo was held.

Because the award nominees are generated by independent booksellers based on books they have loved in their own stores, there is no formal outside submission process.

== Criteria ==
The Read Aloud award was given each year to the chapter book and picture book released in the previous year that best meet the ideal of the "Read Aloud" title. The ABC defined a good "Read Aloud" title as a book that booksellers recommended to customers who asked for suggestions on books to read with their family. Nominated picture books were often successfully used by booksellers for storytimes sessions, while chapter books were often books that booksellers had read and loved, had shared with their families, or had recommended for use in classrooms or the library.

The ABC listed possible criteria for a great "Read Aloud" title as including dynamic writing, engaging themes, and universal appeal. The association also emphasized a strong relationship between writing and illustrations for picture books.

== Recipients ==
E.B. White Read Aloud Award winners and honor books
Year	Category	Author	Title	Publisher	Result	Ref.
2004	N/A	Judy Schachner	Skippyjon Jones	Penguin Putnam	Winner	
2005	N/A	Judy Sierra, illus. by Marc Brown	Wild About Books	Random House Books for Young Readers	Winner	
2006	Older Reader	Deborah Wiles	Each Little Bird That Sings	Harcourt	Winner	
2006	Picture Book	Chris Van Dusen	If I Built a Car	Penguin Putnam	Winner	
2007	Older Reader	Watt Key	Alabama Moon	Farrar, Straus and Giroux	Winner	
2007	Picture Book	James Howe, illus. by Marie-Louise Gay	Houndsley and Catina	Candlewick Press	Winner	
2008	Older Reader	Trenton Lee Stewart	The Mysterious Benedict Society	Little, Brown & Co.	Winner	
2008	Picture Book	Elise Broach	When Dinosaurs Came With Everything	Atheneum Books	Winner	
2009	Older Readers	Elise Broach, illus. by Kelly Murphy	Masterpiece	Henry Holt and Company	Winner	
2009	Older Readers	Sarah Prineas	The Magic Thief	HarperCollins	Honor	
2009	Older Readers	Lois Lowry	The Willoughbys	Houghton Mifflin Harcourt	Honor	
2009	Older Readers	Robert Paul Weston, illus. by Victor Rivas	Zorgamazoo	Penguin Books	Honor	
2009	Picture Book	Bonnie Becker, illus. by Kady MacDonald Denton	A Visitor for Bear	Candlewick Press	Winner	
2009	Picture Book	Kate DiCamillo, illus. by Harry Bliss	Louise, the Adventures of a Chicken	HarperCollins	Honor	
2009	Picture Book	Kathryn Otoshi	One	KO Kids Books	Honor	
2009	Picture Book	David Shannon	Too Many Toys	Scholastic	Honor	
2010	Older Readers	Kate Messner	The Brilliant Fall of Gianna Z.	Walker Books for Young Readers	Winner	
2010	Older Readers	Kristin Clark Venuti	Leaving the Bellweathers	Egmont USA	Honor	
2010	Older Readers	Emily Bearn, illus. by Nick Price	Tumtum and Nutmeg: Adventures Beyond Nutmouse Hall	Little, Brown Books for Young Readers	Honor	
2010	Older Readers	Grace Lin	Where the Mountain Meets the Moon	Little, Brown Books for Young Readers	Honor	
2010	Picture Book	Peter Brown	The Curious Garden	Little, Brown & Co.	Winner	
2010	Picture Book	Carmen Agra Deedy, illus. by Thomas Gonzalez	14 Cows for America	Peachtree	Honor	
2010	Picture Book	Denise Doyen, illus. by Barry Moser	Once Upon a Twice	Random House	Honor	
2010	Picture Book	Florence Heide Parry, illus. by Lane Smith	Princess Hyacinth (The Surprising Tale of a Girl Who Floated)	Random House	Honor	
2011	Middle Reader	Tom Angleberger	The Strange Case of Origami Yoda	Amulet Books	Winner	
2011	Middle Reader	Rob Buyea	Because of Mr. Terupt	Delacorte Books	Honor	
2011	Middle Reader	Adam Jay Epstein and Andrew Jacobson	The Familiars	HarperCollins	Honor	
2011	Middle Reader	Laurel Snyder, illus. by Abigail Halpin	Penny Dreadful	Random House	Honor	
2011	Middle Reader	Marianne Malone, illus. by Greg Call	The Sixty-Eight Rooms	Random House	Honor	
2011	Middle Reader	Adam Gidwitz	A Tale Dark and Grimm	Dutton Books	Honor	
2011	Picture Book	Peter Brown	Children Make Terrible Pets	Little, Brown & Co.	Winner	
2011	Picture Book	Brett Helquist	Bedtime for Bear	HarperCollins	Honor	
2011	Picture Book	Keith Graves	Chicken Big	Chronicle Books	Honor	
2011	Picture Book	Eric Litwin, illus. by James Dean	Pete the Cat: I Love My White Shoes	HarperCollins	Honor	
2011	Picture Book	Michael Ian Black, illus. by Kevin Hawkes	A Pig Parade Is a Terrible Idea	Simon & Schuster	Honor	
2011	Picture Book	Deborah Underwood, illus. by Renata Liwska	The Quiet Book	Houghton Mifflin Harcourt	Honor	
2012	Middle Reader	Colin Meloy, illus. by Carson Ellis	Wildwood	Balzer + Bray	Winner	
2012	Middle Reader	Maile Meloy, illus. by Ian Schoenherr	The Apothecary	Putnam Juvenile	Winner	
2012	Middle Reader	Carmen Agra Deedy and Randall Wright, illus. by Barry Moser	The Cheshire Cheese Cat: A Dickens of a Tale	Peachtree	Honor	
2012	Middle Reader	Lauren Oliver, illus. by Kei Acedera	Liesl & Po	HarperCollins	Honor	
2012	Middle Reader	Katherine Paterson and John Paterson, illus. by John Rocco	The Flint Heart	Candlewick Press	Honor	
2012	Middle Reader	Pat Schmatz	Bluefish	Candlewick Press	Honor	
2012	Picture Books	Jon Klassen	I Want My Hat Back	Candlewick Press	Winner	
2012	Picture Books	Kate Messner, illus. by Christopher Silas Neal	Over and Under the Snow	Chronicle Books	Honor	
2012	Picture Books	Mary Lyn Ray, illus. by Marla Frazee	Stars	Beach Lane Books	Honor	
2012	Picture Books	Sherri Duskey Rinker, illus. by Tom Lichtenheld	Goodnight	Chronicle Books	Honor	
2012	Picture Books	Hervé Tullet	Press Here	Chronicle Books	Honor	
2012	Picture Books	Chris Van Dusen	King Hugo's Huge Ego	Candlewick Press	Honor	
2013	Middle Reader	R. J. Palacio	Wonder	Knopf Books for Young Readers	Winner	
2013	Middle Reader	Katherine Applegate, illus. by Patricia Castelao	The One and Only Ivan	HarperCollins	Honor	
2013	Middle Reader	Jasper Fforde	The Last Dragonslayer	Harcourt Children's Books	Honor	
2013	Middle Reader	Silas House and Neela Vaswani	Same Sun Here	Candlewick Press	Honor	
2013	Middle Reader	Jennifer A. Nielsen	The False Prince	Scholastic Press	Honor	
2013	Middle Reader	Sheila Turnage	Three Times Lucky	Dial Press for Young Readers	Honor	
2013	Picture Books	Mac Barnett, illus. by Jon Klassen	Extra Yarn	Balzer + Bray	Winner	
2013	Picture Books	Kelly Bingham, illus. by Paul O. Zelinsky	Z is for Moose	Greenwillow Books	Honor	
2013	Picture Books	Candace Fleming, illus. by Eric Rohmann	Oh, No!	Schwartz & Wade	Honor	
2013	Picture Books	Gianna Marino	Too Tall Houses	Viking Juvenile	Honor	
2013	Picture Books	Aaron Reynolds and Peter Brown	Creepy Carrots!	Simon & Schuster Books for Young Readers	Honor	
2013	Picture Books	Philip C. Stead, illus. by Erin Stead	Bear Has a Story to Tell	Roaring Brook Press	Honor	
2014	Middle Reader	Kate DiCamillo, illus. by K.G. Campbell	Flora & Ulysses	Candlewick Press	Winner	
2014	Middle Reader	Karen Foxlee	Ophelia and the Marvelous Boy	Knopf Books for Young Readers	Honor	
2014	Middle Reader	Holly Goldberg Sloan	Counting By 7s	Dial Press for Young Readers	Honor	
2014	Middle Reader	Kevin Henkes	The Year of Billy Miller	Greenwillow Books	Honor	
2014	Middle Reader	Richard Peck, illus. by Kelly Murphy	The Mouse with the Question Mark Tail	Dial Press for Young Readers	Honor	
2014	Middle Reader	Katherine Rundell, illus. by Terry Fan	Rooftoppers	Simon & Schuster Books for Young Readers	Honor	
2014	Picture Book	Drew Daywalt, illus. by Oliver Jeffers	The Day the Crayons Quit	Philomel Books	Winner	
2014	Picture Book	Samantha Berger, illus. by Dan Santat	Crankenstein	Little, Brown Books for Young Readers	Honor	
2014	Picture Book	Peter Brown	Mr. Tiger Goes Wild	Little, Brown Books for Young Readers	Honor	
2014	Picture Book	Adam Lehrhaupt	Warning: Do Not Open This Book!	Paula Wiseman Books	Honor	
2014	Picture Book	Emily Winfield Martin	Dream Animals: A Bedtime Journey	Random House Books for Young Readers	Honor	
2014	Picture Book	Bob Shea	Unicorn Thinks He's Pretty Great	Disney-Hyperion	Honor	
2015	Middle Reader	Jacqueline Woodson	Brown Girl Dreaming	Nancy Paulsen Books	Winner	
2015	Middle Reader	Mac Barnett and Jory John, illus. by Kevin Cornell	The Terrible Two	Amulet Books	Honor	
2015	Middle Reader	Kimberly Brubaker Bradley	The War That Saved My Life	Dial Press for Young Readers	Honor	
2015	Middle Reader	Jennifer L. Holm	The Fourteenth Goldfish	Random House Books for Young Readers	Honor	
2015	Middle Reader	Natalie Lloyd	A Snicker of Magic	Scholastic Press	Honor	
2015	Middle Reader	Kenneth Oppel, illus. by Jim Tierney	The Boundless	Simon & Schuster Books for Young Readers	Honor	
2015	Picture Books	Mac Barnett, illus. by Jon Klassen	Sam and Dave Dig a Hole	Candlewick Press	Winner	
2015	Picture Books	Matt de la Peña, illus. by Christian Robinson	Last Stop on Market Street	Putnam Young Readers	Honor	
2015	Picture Books	Jory John, illus. by Benji Davies	Goodnight Already!	HarperCollins	Honor	
2015	Picture Books	Richard T. Morris	This Is a Moose	Little, Brown Books for Young Readers	Honor	
2015	Picture Books	Justin Roberts, illus. by Christian Robinson	The Smallest Girl in the Smallest Grade	Putnam Young Readers	Honor	
2015	Picture Books	Bob Shea, illus. by Lane Smith	Kid Sheriff and the Terrible Toads	Roaring Brook Press	Honor	
2016	Middle Reader	Ali Benjamin	The Thing About Jellyfish	Little, Brown Books for Young Readers	Winner	
2016	Middle Reader	Katherine Applegate	Crenshaw	Feiwel & Friends	Honor	
2016	Middle Reader	Alex Gino	Melissa	Scholastic Press	Honor	
2016	Middle Reader	Victoria Jamieson	Roller Girl	Dial Press for Young Readers	Honor	
2016	Middle Reader	Kelly Jones	Unusual Chickens for the Exceptional Poultry Farmer	Knopf Books for Young Readers	Honor	
2016	Middle Reader	Kevin Sands	The Blackthorn Key	Aladdin	Honor	
2016	Picture Books	Ryan T. Higgins	Mother Bruce	Disney-Hyperion	Winner	
2016	Picture Books	Kate Beaton	The Princess and the Pony	Arthur A. Levine Books	Honor	
2016	Picture Books	Michael Hall	Red: A Crayon's Story	Greenwillow	Honor	
2016	Picture Books	Kevin Henkes	Waiting	Greenwillow Books	Honor	
2016	Picture Books	Emily Jenkins, illus. by Paul O. Zelinsky	Toys Meet Snow: Being the Wintertime Adventures of a Curious Stuffed Buffalo, a Sensitive Plush Stingray, and a Book-Loving Rubber Ball	Schwartz & Wade	Honor	
2016	Picture Books	Mac Barnett, illus. by Christian Robinson	Leo: A Ghost Story	Chronicle Books	Honor	
2017	Middle Reader	Kelly Barnhill	The Girl Who Drank the Moon	Algonquin Young Readers	Winner	
2017	Middle Reader	Leslie Connor	All Rise for the Honorable Perry T. Cook	Katherine Tegen Books	Honor	
2017	Middle Reader	Adam Gidwitz, illus. by Hatem Ali	The Inquisitor's Tale: Or, The Three Magical Children and Their Holy Dog	Dutton Books for Young Readers	Honor	
2017	Middle Reader	Grace Lin	When the Sea Turned to Silver	Little, Brown Books for Young Readers	Honor	
2017	Middle Reader	Richard Peck	The Best Man	Dial Press	Honor	
2017	Middle Reader	Jason Reynolds	As Brave As You	Atheneum/Caitlyn Dlouhy Books	Honor	
2017	Picture Books	Carson Ellis	Du Iz Tak?	Candlewick Press	Winner	
2017	Picture Books	Jabari Asim, illus. by E. B. Lewis	Preaching to the Chickens: The Story of Young John Lewis	Nancy Paulsen Books	Honor	
2017	Picture Books	Ross Collins	There's a Bear on My Chair	Nosy Crow	Honor	
2017	Picture Books	Julie Fogliano, illus. by Julie Morstad	When Green Becomes Tomatoes: Poems for All Seasons	Roaring Brook Press	Honor	
2017	Picture Books	Susan Hood, illus. by Sally Wern Comport	Ada's Violin: The Story of the Recycled Orchestra of Paraguay	Simon & Schuster Books for Young Readers	Honor	
2017	Picture Books	Adam Rex, illus. by Christian Robinson	School's First Day of School	Roaring Brook Press	Honor	
2018	Middle Reader	Katherine Applegate	Wishtree	Feiwel & Friends	Winner	
2018	Middle Reader	Pablo Cartaya	The Epic Fail of Arturo Zamora	Viking Books for Young Readers	Honor	
2018	Middle Reader	Alan Gratz	Refugee	Scholastic Press	Honor	
2018	Middle Reader	Nikki Grimes	One Last Word	Bloomsbury USA Children's Books	Honor	
2018	Middle Reader	David Barclay Moore	The Stars Beneath Our Feet	Knopf Books for Young Readers	Honor	
2018	Middle Reader	Celia C. Pérez	The First Rule of Punk	Viking Books for Young Readers	Honor	
2018	Picture Books	Mac Barnett, illus. by Jon Klassen	The Wolf, the Duck, and the Mouse	Candlewick Press	Winner	
2018	Picture Books	Thyra Heder	Alfie (The Turtle That Disappeared)	Harry N. Abrams	Honor	
2018	Picture Books	Holly M. McGhee	Come With Me	G.P. Putnam's Sons Books for Young Readers	Honor	
2018	Picture Books	Adam Rubin, illus. by Daniel Salmieri	Dragons Love Tacos 2: The Sequel	Dial Press	Honor	
2018	Picture Books	Dan Santat	After the Fall (How Humpty Dumpty Got Back Up Again)	Roaring Brook Press	Honor	
2018	Picture Books	Dashka Slater, illus. by Sydney Hanson	Escargot	Farrar, Straus and Giroux Books for Young Readers	Honor	
2019	Middle Reader	Jewell Parker Rhodes	Ghost Boys	Little, Brown Books for Young Readers	Winner	
2019	Middle Reader	Jonathan Auxier	Sweep: The Story of a Girl and Her Monster	Amulet Books	Honor	
2019	Middle Reader	Sayantani DasGupta	The Serpent’s Secret	Scholastic Press	Honor	
2019	Middle Reader	Adam Gidwitz, illus. by Hatem Aly	The Creature of the Pines	Dutton Books for Young Readers	Honor	
2019	Middle Reader	Anna Meriano	Love Sugar Magic: A Dash of Trouble	Walden Pond Press	Honor	
2019	Middle Reader	Kelly Yang	Front Desk	Arthur A. Levine Books	Honor	
2019	Picture Book	Ryan T. Higgins	We Don’t Eat Our Classmates	Disney-Hyperion	Winner	
2019	Picture Book	Cori Doerrfeld	The Rabbit Listened	Dial Press	Honor	
2019	Picture Book	Oge Mora	Thank You, Omu!	Little, Brown Books for Young Readers	Honor	
2019	Picture Book	Jessie Sima	Harriet Gets Carried Away	Simon & Schuster Books for Young Readers	Honor	
2019	Picture Book	Ed Vere	How to Be a Lion	Doubleday Books for Young Readers	Honor	
2019	Picture Book	Jacqueline Woodson	The Day You Begin	Nancy Paulsen Books	Honor	
