= Chris Barton (author) =

American author of children's books

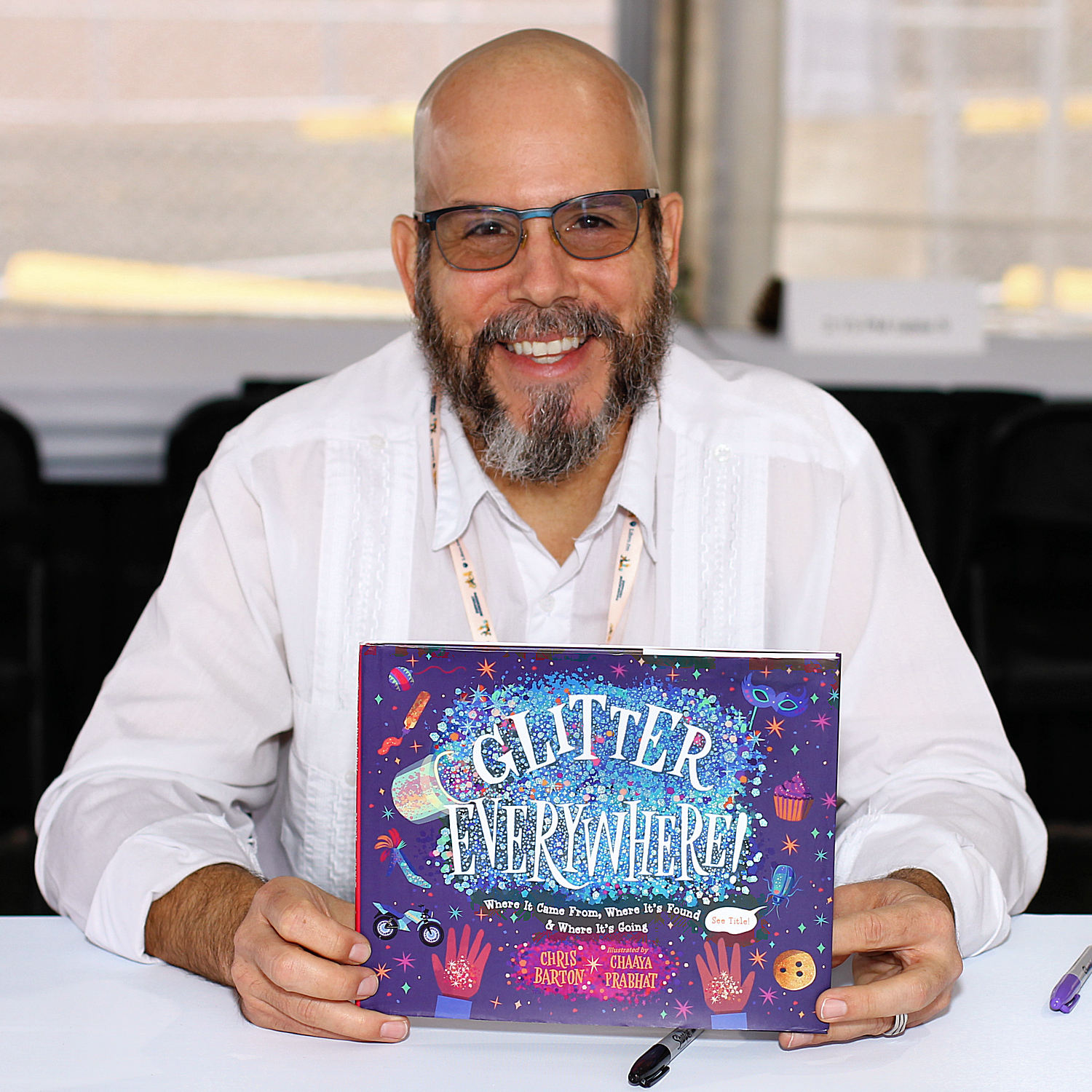
- Barton at the 2023 Texas Book Festival
- Education: University of Texas at Austin
- Occupation: Author of children's books
- Spouse: Jennifer Ziegler
- Children: 4
- Website: chrisbarton.info

Chris Barton is an American author of children's books. His books has been included on numerous lists citing the best children's books of the year.

== Biography ==
Barton grew up in Sulphur Springs, Texas, with his parents and older brother, though his father died when Barton was eight years old. Both of his parents, as well as his mother's parents had also grown up in Sulphur Springs.

In 1993, he graduated from the University of Texas at Austin (UT) with a degree in history. During his time at UT, he wrote for The Daily Texan.

In 2014, Barton pitched the idea of the Modern First Library (MFL) to BookPeople, an independent bookstore in Austin, which they followed up on. MFL "builds on book shoppers' inclination to buy a kid a "classic" picture book and leads them to also buy a new picture book that's more reflective of the modern, diverse society that those kids are growing up in."

Barton currently lives in Austin, Texas with his wife, Jennifer Ziegler. Together, they have four adult children.

== Awards and honors ==
Eight of Barton's books are Junior Library Guild selections: Shark vs. Train (2010), Can I See Your I.D.? (2011), That's Not Bunny! (2016), Whoosh! English and Spanish editions (2016/2019), Dazzle Ships (2017), All of a Sudden and Forever (2020), and How to Make a Book (2021).

Barton's books have frequently landed on lists of the year's best books.

In 2009, The Day Glo Brothers was named one of the best children's books of the year by Publishers Weekly, School Library Journal, and The Washington Post.

Shark vs. Train was a New York Times bestseller. Barnes & Noble, Kirkus Reviews, Parents, Publishers Weekly, School Library Journal, and The Washington Post named it one of the best children's books of 2010. In 2011, Bank Street College of Education named it one of the best books for children ages five to nine.

In 2016, Whoosh! was named one of the best picture books of the year by the American Booksellers Association, Center for the Study of Multicultural Children's Literature, and Kirkus Reviews. The Chicago Public Library and the New York Public Library named it one of the year's best informational books for children.

In 2017, Bank Street College of Education included 88 Instruments and Whoosh! in their list of the best books of the year for children ages five to nine. They stated Whoosh! is a book of "outstanding merit." The National Science Teaching Association included Whoosh! on their list of the best STEM books of the year.

The same year, the Chicago Public Library named Dazzle Ships one of the year's best informational books for younger readers, and the New York Public Library included it on their list of the best books of the year for kids.

In 2018, What Do You Do with a Voice Like That? was named one of the best children's books of the year by Kirkus Reviews, and the University of Pennsylvania's Graduate School of Education. The following year, the Bank Street College of Education ranked it as a book of outstanding merit, and Booklist included it on their "Top 10 Biographies for Youth" list.

In 2022, School Library Journal named Moving Forward one of the best nonfiction children's books of year.

Awards for Barton's writing
Year	Title	Award	Result	Ref.
2009	The Day-Glo Brothers	Cybils Award for Nonfiction Picture Book	Winner	
2010	The Day-Glo Brothers	ALSC Notable Children's Books	Selection	
2010	The Day-Glo Brothers	Sibert Medal	Honor	
2010	Shark vs. Train	Cybils Award for Fiction Picture Book	Finalist	
2011	Shark vs. Train	Children's Choice Book Award: Kindergarten to Second Grade	Finalist	
2012	Can I See Your I.D.?	Quick Picks for Reluctant Young Adult Readers	Selection	
2012	Can I See Your I.D.?	YALSA Award for Excellence in Nonfiction	Nominee	
2016	The Amazing Age of John Roy Lynch	NCSS Carter G. Woodson Book Award: Elementary	Winner	
2017	Dazzle Ships	Cybils Award for Elementary Nonfiction	Finalist	
2017	Whoosh!	Children's and Teen Choice Book Award: Third to Fourth Grade	Finalist	
2018	Dazzle Ships	ALSC Notable Children's Books	Selection	
2018	Dazzle Ships	NCTE Orbis Pictus Award	Honor	
2018	What Do You Do with a Voice Like That?	Booklist Editors' Choice: Books for Youth	Selection	
2018	What Do You Do with a Voice Like That?	Cybils Award for Elementary Nonfiction	Finalist	
2019	What Do You Do with a Voice Like That?	ALSC Notable Children's Books	Selection	
2019	What Do You Do with a Voice Like That?	NCTE Orbis Pictus Award	Recommended	
2019	Whoosh!	Beverly Cleary Children's Choice Award	Winner	
2020	What Do You Do With a Voice Like That?	Rise: A Feminist Book Project	Top 10	

== Publications ==
=== Anthology contributions ===
- "Go to College After High School" in Break These Rules, edited by Luke Reynolds (2013)
- “Two-a-Days” in One Death, Nine Stories, edited by Marc Aronson and Charles R. Smith Jr. (2014)
- "What Will You Do with a Gift Like Yours?" in Nonfiction Writers Dig Deep, edited by Melissa Stewart (2020)

=== Fiction ===
==== Standalone books ====
- Shark vs. Train, illustrated by Tom Lichtenheld (2010)
- 88 Instruments, illustrated by Louis Thomas (2016)
- That's Not Bunny!, illustrated by Colin Jack (2016)
- Book or Bell?, illustrated by Ashley Spires (2017)
- Fire Truck vs. Dragon, illustrated by Shanda McCloskey (2020)

==== Mighty Truck series ====
The Mighty Truck series is illustrated by Troy Cummings.

- Muddymania! (2017)
- On the Farm (2018)
- The Traffic Tie-Up (2018)
- Zip and Beep (2018)
- Surf's Up! (2019)

=== Nonfiction ===
- The Day-Glo Brothers: The True Story of Bob and Joe Switzer's Bright Ideas and Brand-New Colors, illustrated by Tony Persiani (2009)
- Can I See Your I.D.?: True Stories of False Identities, Illustrations by Paul Hoppe (2011)
- Attack! Boss! Cheat Code!: A Gamer's Alphabet, illustrated by Joey Spiotto (2014)
- The Amazing Age of John Roy Lynch, illustrated by Don Tate (2015)
- 'The Nutcracker' Comes to America: How Three Ballet-Loving Brothers Created a Holiday Tradition, illustrated by Cathy Gendron (2015)
- Whoosh!: Lonnie Johnson's Super-Soaking Stream of Inventions, illustrated by Don Tate (2016)
  - Spanish edition: ¡Fushhh!: El chorro del inventos súper-húmedos de Lonnie Johnson
- Dazzle Ships: World War I and the Art of Confusion, illustrated by Victo Ngai (2017)
- What Do You Do with a Voice Like That?: The Story of Extraordinary Congresswoman Barbara Jordan, illustrated by Ekua Holmes (2018)
- All of a Sudden and Forever: Help and Healing After the Oklahoma City Bombing, illustrated by Nicole Xu (2020)
- How to Make a Book (About My Dog), illustrated by Sarah Horne (2021)
- Sister, Brother, Family: An American Childhood in Music, co-written with Willie Nelson and Bobbie Nelson, illustrated by Kyung Eun Han (2021)
- Moving Forward: From Space-Age Rides to Civil Rights Sit-Ins with Airman Alton Yates, illustrated by Steffi Walthall (2022)
- Glitter Everywhere!: Where It Came From, Where It's Found & Where It's Going, illustrated by Chaaya Prabhat (2023)
