= Jennifer Ziegler =

American writer

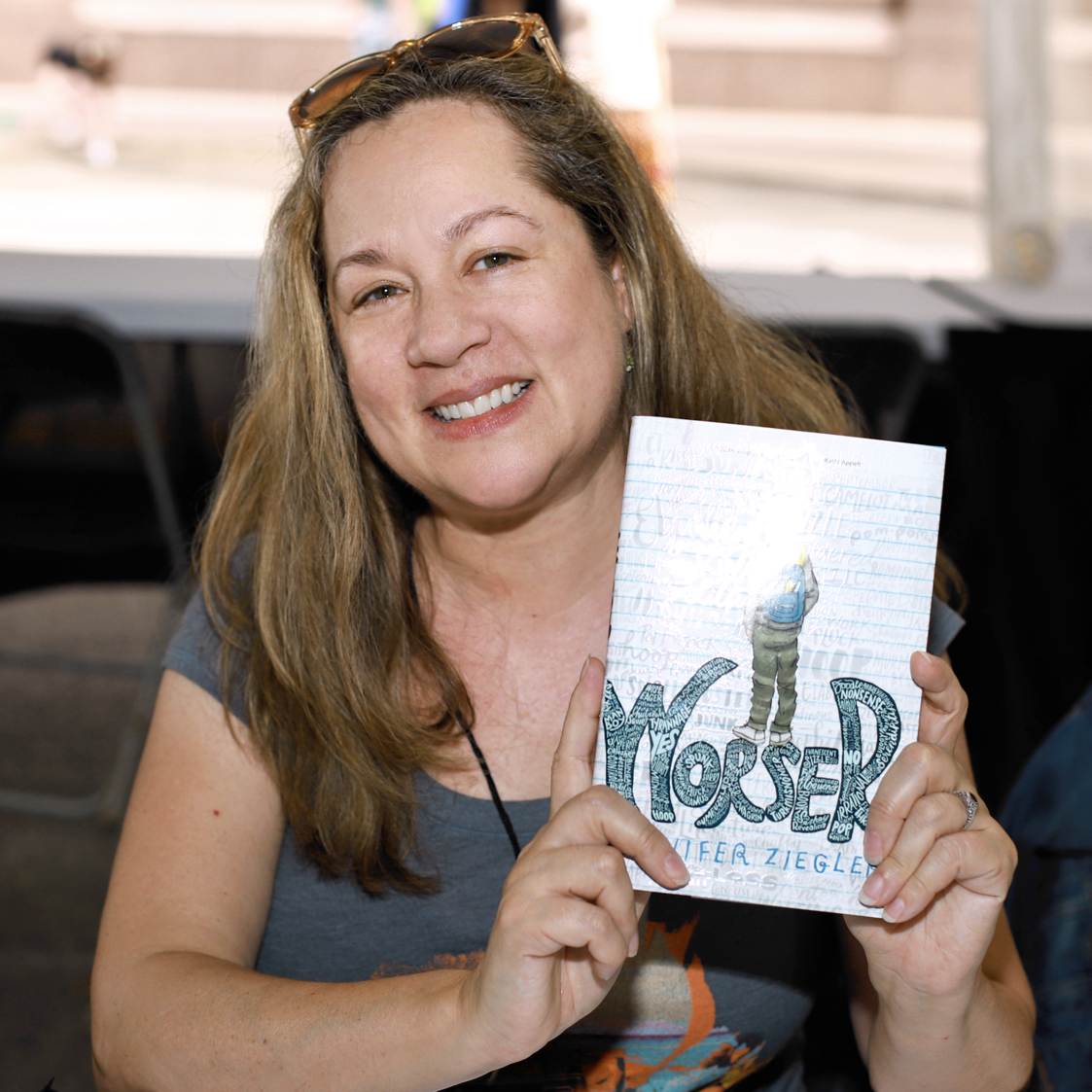
- Ziegler at the 2022 Texas Book Festival
- Occupation: Author of children's books
- Spouse: Chris Barton
- Website: jenniferziegler.com

Jennifer Ziegler is an American writer and faculty member at Vermont College of Fine Arts.

== Biography ==
Ziegler was raised in Texas and is of Mexican-American heritage. She received a Bachelor of Arts in English and a Bachelor of Journalism in magazine journalism from the University of Texas. She presently serves as the faculty co-chair of Vermont College of Fine Arts's Master of Fine Arts program in Writing for Children and Young Adults.

== Personal life ==
Ziegler currently lives in Austin, Texas with her husband, Chris Barton, who is also a writer. Together, they have four adult children.

== Publications ==
=== Standalone books ===
- Alpha Dog (2007, Delacorte Press, ISBN 978-0-3857-3285-7)
- How Not to Be Popular (2008, Delacorte Press, ISBN 978-0-3857-3465-3)
- Sass & Serendipity (2011, Delacorte Press, ISBN 978-0-3857-3898-9)
- Worser (2022, Margaret Ferguson Books, ISBN 978-0-8234-4956-9)

=== Brewster Triplets series ===
The Brewster Triplets series is published by Scholastic Inc.

1. Revenge of the Flower Girls (2014, ISBN 978-0-5455-6141-9)
2. Revenge of the Angels (2015, ISBN 978-0-5458-3899-3)
3. Revenge of the Happy Campers (2017, ISBN 978-1-3380-9119-9)
4. Revenge of the Teacher's Pets (2018, ISBN 978-1-3380-9123-6)
