= Skippyjon Jones =

Children's picture book series by Judith Byron Schachner

- Cover of the first book under Penguin Random House brand
- Author: Judith Byron Schachner
- Illustrator: Judith Byron Schachner
- Cover artist: Schachner
- Language: English
- Series: Skippyjon Jones series
- Genre: Children's story, picture book
- Publisher: Dutton Juvenile
- Publication date: 2003
- Publication place: United States
- Media type: Print (Paperback)

Skippyjon Jones is a children's picture book series, written and illustrated by Judith Byron Schachner. The first book was published in 2003 by Dutton Juvenile. The books are notable for their popularity amongst children, use of mock Spanish, and controversy over their representation of Latinos.

== Summary ==
The title character, Skippyjon Jones, is a Siamese cat with unusually large ears, an equally large head and an unusually small tail. Since he doesn't look like his mother and sisters, he pretends to be a Chihuahua, although he is aware he is a cat. He has a group of imaginary Chihuahua friends, Los Chimichangos who follow him throughout his imaginary adventures. He lives with his mother Junebug, his three sisters Jezebel, Jillyboo, and Jujube. The stories follow Skippyjon Jones on his various adventures.

== Books ==
Skippyjon Jones is published under Penguin Random House within its Dutton Juvenile division.

Title	Publication Date	ISBN
Skippyjon Jones	September 15, 2003	9780525471349
Skippyjon Jones in the Dog House	April 7, 2005	9780142407493
Skippyjon Jones in Mummy Trouble	October 19, 2006	9780142412114
Skippyjon Jones: Up & Down	February 15, 2007	9780525478072
Skippyjon Jones: Color Crazy	March 2, 2007	9780525477822
Skippyjon Jones and the Big Bones	October 18, 2007	9780525478843
Skippyjon Jones Takes a Dive	January 8, 2008	9780448450810
Skippyjon Jones: Shape Up	January 24, 2008	9780525479574
Skippyjon Jones: 1-2-3	January 24, 2008	9780525479567
Skippyjon Jones: A Surprise for Mama	March 27, 2008	9780448448169
Skippyjon Jones and the Treasure Hunt	May 1, 2008	9780448448176
Skippyjon Jones: ¡Ay Card-ramba!	September 4, 2008	9780448448190
Skippyjon Jones: Up, Up, and Away!	January 8, 2009	9780448450827
Skippyjon Jones: The Great Bean Caper	May 14, 2009	9780448451671
Skippyjon Jones: Costume Crazee	August 20, 2009	9780448451688
Skippyjon Jones: Lost in Spice	September 22, 2009	9780525479659
Skippyjon Jones: Presto-Change-O	September 21, 2010	9780525423584
Skippyjon Jones: Class Action	July 12, 2011	9780525422280
Skippyjon Jones: Cirque De Olé	October 16, 2012	9780803737822
Skippyjon Jones: Snow What	October 21, 2014	9780803737891

== Controversy ==
Several reviews criticize Skippyjon Jones’ depiction of Latinos and use of mock Spanish. Due to its stereotypes, the series is ranked 8 on the American Library Association's list of top challenged books for 2018. Amy Senta, an early childhood professor, described a moment when a Latino child remarked he thought the book was mocking him. Following this experience, she analyzed the books and summarized them as demeaning Mexicans through characterization, improper use of language, and the enforcement of a “white savior” modality. Particularly, the Spanish used is oftentimes incorrect and can mislead non-Spanish speakers into believing a word is Spanish due to the addition of Spanish articles and endings. Another analysis states Skippyjon Jones and his chihuahua friends are humanized and given traits symbolic of Latinos. Through this depiction and anthropomorphization, the characters are seen as substitutes for "racial and ethnic identities," a representation invoking "tokenism."

However, these critiques are criticized for advocating censorship of the books and projecting ideas of racism into a children’s series. There is discussion regarding the roles of these books in children's literature due to their wide success. This discourse focuses on their success commercially combined with the overarching criticisms of stereotyping. Although, Schachner defends her writing and claims the books are intended for education.

== Reception ==
Reviews of the books are generally positive, highlighting the adventurous tales and descriptive language. One review notes that readers searching for true depictions of Latinos are best served elsewhere. In 2004, Skippyjon Jones won the first annual E. B. White Read Aloud Award, handed out by The Association of Booksellers for Children. Also, Skippyjon Jones has won several local children's book awards, including the New Hampshire State Library's 2005 Ladybug Picture Book Award, the 2005 Washington Children's Choice Picture Book Award, and the 2006 Colorado Council International Reading Association (CCIRA) Colorado Children's Book Award for Picture Book. Based on a 2007 online poll, the National Education Association listed Skippyjon Jones as one of its "Teachers' Top 100 Books for Children". A New York Times review said Skippyjon Jones is a fun, bilingual book similar to a Ulysses for kids.

== Theatre Production ==
Following commercial success, Skippyjon Jones and Skippyjon Jones: Snow What were both adapted into musical productions. In 2011 and 2014, Theatreworks USA put on productions of Skippyjon Jones at the Pittsburgh International Children's Theater and various other locations in Pittsburgh. The performances received good reviews, stating the show was enjoyable for all ages. In 2016, the H. Ric Luhrs Performing Arts Center in Shippensburg, PA hosted a production of Skippyjon Jones: Snow What that was commended for its set design and performance.
