= Mac Barnett =

American children's books author

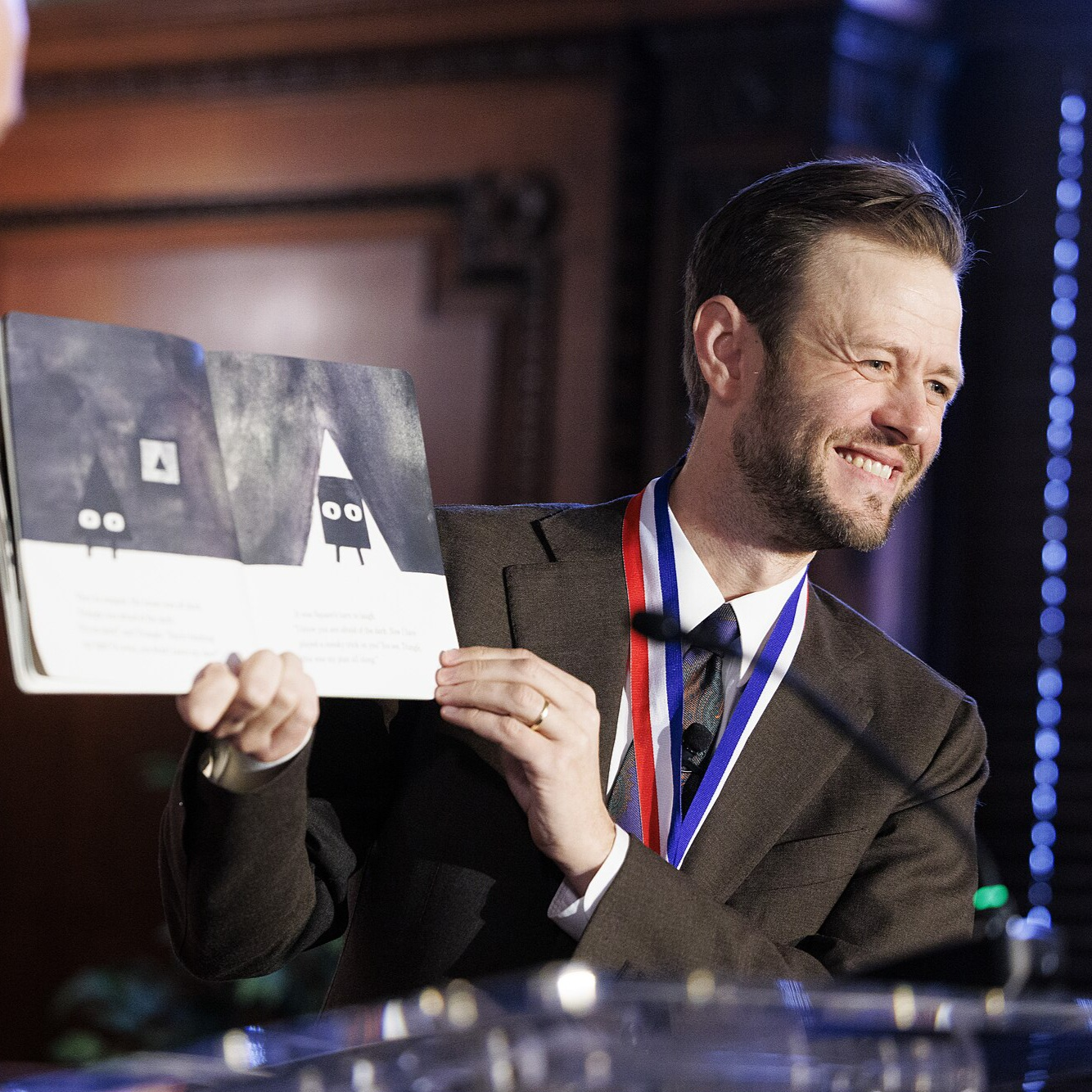
- Barnett in 2025
- Born: August 23, 1982 (age 44); Castro Valley, California, U.S.
- Education: Pomona College
- Occupation: Writer
- Spouse: Taylor Norman
- Writing career
- Period: 2009–present
- Genre: Children's books
- Notable works: Extra Yarn; The Terrible Two (book series); Sam and Dave Dig a Hole
- Notable awards: Caldecott Medal (Author); E.B. White Read Aloud Award; Boston Globe-Horn Book Award; German Youth Literature Award; Chen Bochui International Children’s Literature Award; Silver Griffel; Premio Orbil
- Website: macbarnett.com

Mac Barnett (born August 23, 1982) is an American children's book writer best known for his advocacy of picture books. He has published over seventy works since 2009, consisting of over fifty picture books, graphic novels, essays, and short stories. He currently serves as the National Ambassador for Young People's Literature (2025-26).

== Early life and education ==
Barnett grew up in the San Francisco Bay Area, and graduated from Bishop O’Dowd High School in Oakland. He attended Pomona College, where he studied under the writer David Foster Wallace.

== Career ==
=== Collaboration with Jon Klassen ===
Extra Yarn, a picture book illustrated by Jon Klassen, won the 2012 Boston Globe–Horn Book Award and 2013 E. B. White Read Aloud Award. It was a Caldecott Medal Honor Book. Sam & Dave Dig a Hole, illustrated by Jon Klassen, won a Caldecott Honor and the 2015 E.B. White Read Aloud Award.

He is the co-creator, with Jon Klassen, of the Emmy-award winning children's animated series Shape Island on Apple TV+, based on their Shapes trilogy of picture books.

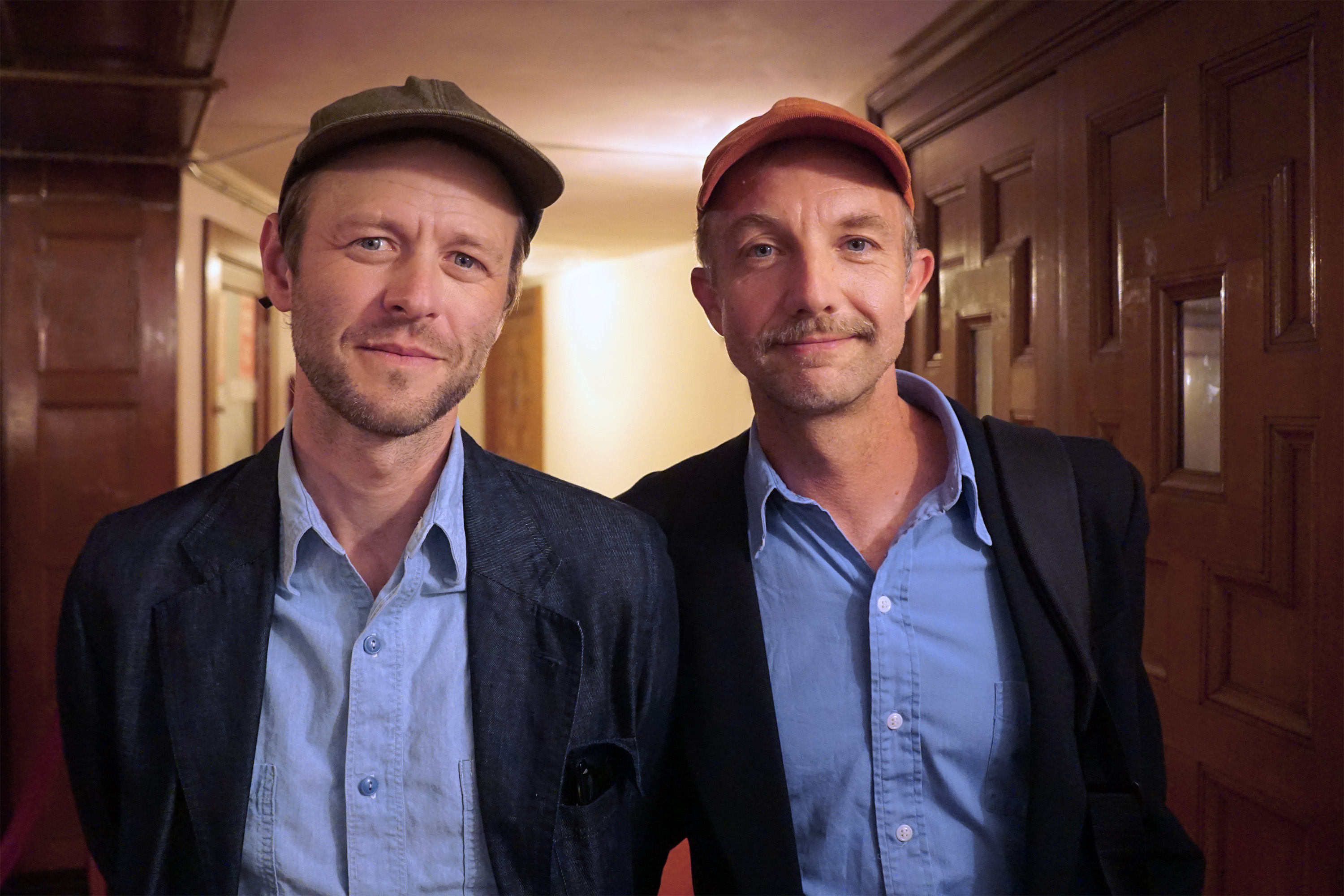
Mac Barnett and Jon Klassen at City Arts & Lectures in San Francisco on May 14 2026

=== Advocacy for picture books ===
In 2011, Barnett wrote the Picture Book Proclamation, an art manifesto about picture books signed by 21 other children's writers.

In 2024, Barnett wrote La Porta Segreta, a book for adults about children's books, published in Italian by Terre di Mezzo, later published in English under the title Make Believe.

In February 2025, Barnett was inaugurated at the Library of Congress as the 2025-26 National Ambassador for Young People’s Literature.

=== "Sturgeon's Law" controversy ===
In May 2026, Barnett released a book of essays for adults, Make Believe: On Telling Stories to Children. In a chapter on literary quality, he modified Sturgeon's Law, the notion that "Ninety percent of everything is crap", writing, "I have a nagging fear that children’s literature suffers from a slightly higher crud percentage than literature as a whole. So I now offer Barnett’s Addendum to Sturgeon’s Law: Maybe more like 94.7 percent of kids’ books are crud."

This remark caused controversy among other figures in children's literature who felt that it was insensitive and inappropriate. Barnett released an apology statement via the Library of Congress, and expressed regret at how he had expressed the sentiment in interview with author Jeff Kinney.

== Works ==
=== Essays ===
- Make Believe: On Telling Stories to Children - Cover by Carson Ellis

=== Novels ===
- The Brixton Brothers - By Mac Barnett, with illustrations by Adam Rex and Matthew Myers (Simon & Schuster)
1. The Case of the Case of Mistaken Identity (Oct. 6, 2009). ISBN 978-1-4169-7816-9
2. The Ghostwriter Secret (Oct. 5, 2010). ISBN 978-1-4169-7818-3
3. It Happened on a Train (Oct. 4, 2011). ISBN 978-1-4169-7819-0
4. Danger Goes Berserk, illus. Matthew Myers (Oct. 2, 2013). ISBN 978-1-4424-3978-8
- The Terrible Two - By Mac Barnett and Jory John, with illustrations by Kevin Cornell (Amulet Books)
1. The Terrible Two (Jan. 13, 2015). ISBN 978-1-4197-2737-5
2. The Terrible Two Get Worse (Jan. 12, 2016). ISBN 978-1-4197-2738-2
3. The Terrible Two Go Wild (Jan. 9, 2018). ISBN 978-1-4197-3205-8
4. The Terrible Two's Last Laugh (Dec. 24, 2018). ISBN 978-1-4197-3621-6
- Mac B., Kid Spy - By Mac Barnett, with illustrations by Mike Lowery
1. Mac B., Kid Spy: Mac Undercover (Sep. 11, 2018). ISBN 978-1-338-14359-1
2. Mac B., Kid Spy: The Impossible Crime (Dec. 26, 2018). ISBN 978-1-338-14368-3
3. Mac B., Kid Spy: Top-Secret Smackdown (Sep. 17, 2019). ISBN 978-1-338-14371-3
4. Mac B., Kid Spy: Mac Cracks the Code (Dec. 26, 2019). ISBN 978-1-338-59423-2
5. Mac B., Kid Spy: The Sound of Danger (Sep. 1, 2020). ISBN 978-1-338-59426-3
6. Mac B., Kid Spy: Mac Saves the World (Jun. 1, 2021). ISBN 978-1-338-74245-9

=== Picture books ===
- The Shapes Trilogy - By Mac Barnett, with illustrations by Jon Klassen (Candlewick Press)
  - Triangle (Mar. 14, 2017). ISBN 978-0-7636-9603-0
  - Square (May 8, 2018). ISBN 978-0-7636-9607-8
  - Circle (Mar. 5, 2019). ISBN 978-0-7636-9608-5
- A Jack Book - By Mac Barnett, with illustrations by Greg Pizzoli (Viking Books)
1. Hi, Jack! (Sep. 3, 2019). ISBN 978-0-593-11379-0
2. Jack Blasts Off! (Sep. 3, 2019). ISBN 978-0-593-11385-1
3. Jack at Bat! (Feb. 4, 2020). ISBN 978-0-593-11382-0
4. Jack Goes West (Feb. 4, 2020). ISBN 978-0-593-11388-2
5. Jack at the Zoo (May 5, 2020). ISBN 978-0-593-11392-9
6. Too Many Jacks (May 5, 2020). ISBN 978-0-593-11394-3
7. Jack and Santa (Oct. 13, 2020). ISBN 978-0-593-11398-1
8. Jack Gets Zapped! (Feb. 2, 2021). ISBN 978-0-593-11402-5
- Now I See books - By Mac Barnett, with illustrations by Jon Klassen (Tundra Book Group)
  - Now I See Spring (Apr. 7, 2026). ISBN 978-1-77488-673-1
  - Now I See Winter (Apr. 7, 2026). ISBN 9781774886694
  - Now I See Fall (Apr. 7, 2026). ISBN 978-1-77488-665-6
  - Now I See Summer (Apr. 7, 2026). ISBN 978-1-77488-677-9
- Billy Twitters and His Blue Whale Problem, illus. Adam Rex (Hyperion Books, Jun 23, 2009). ISBN 978-0-7868-4958-1
- Guess Again!, illus. Adam Rex (Simon & Schuster, Sep. 15, 2009). ISBN 978-1-4169-5566-5
- The Clock without a Face: a Gus Twintig mystery, Mac Barnett, Eli Horowitz, & Scott Teplin. Illus. Adam Rex & numbers by Anna Sheffield (McSweeney's, Apr. 27, 2010). ISBN 978-1-934781-71-5
- Oh No! (Or How My Science Project Destroyed the World), illus. Dan Santat (Hyperion, Jun. 1, 2010). ISBN 978-1-4231-2312-5
- Mustache!, illus. Kevin Cornell (Hyperion, Oct. 25, 2011). ISBN 978-1-4231-1671-4
- Extra Yarn, illus. Jon Klassen (Balzer + Bray, Jan. 17, 2012). ISBN 978-0-06-195338-5
- Chloe and the Lion, illus. Adam Rex (Hyperion, Apr. 3, 2012). ISBN 9781423113348
- Oh No, Not Again! (Or How I Built a Time Machine to Save History) (Or at Least My History Grade), illus. Dan Santat (Hyperion, Jun. 5, 2012). ISBN 978-1-4231-4912-5
- Count the Monkeys, illus. Kevin Cornell, (Hyperion, Jun. 24, 2012). ISBN 978-1-4231-6065-6
- Battle Bunny, Mac Barnett & Jon Scieszka. Illus. Matthew Myers & Alex, but mostly Alex (Simon & Schuster, Oct. 22, 2013). ISBN 978-1-4424-4673-1
- President Taft is Stuck in the Bath, illus. Chris Van Dusen (Candlewick Press, 2014). ISBN 978-0-7636-6556-2
- Telephone, illus. Jen Corace (Chronicle Books, Sep. 9, 2014). ISBN 978-1-4521-1023-3
- Sam and Dave Dig a Hole, illus. Jon Klassen (Candlewick Press, Oct. 14, 2014). ISBN 978-0-7636-6229-5
- The Skunk, illus. Patrick McDonnell (Roaring Book Press, Apr. 14, 2015). ISBN 978-1-59643-966-5
- Leo: A Ghost Story, illus. Christian Robinson (Chronicle Books, Aug. 25, 2015). ISBN 978-1-4521-3156-6
- Rules of the House, illus. Matthew Myers (Hyperion, May 3, 2016). ISBN 978-1-4231-8516-1
- How This Book Was Made, illus. Adam Rex (Disney-Hyperion, Sep. 6, 2016). ISBN 978-1-4231-5220-0
- The Magic Word, illus. Elise Parsley (Balzer + Bray, Oct. 4, 2016). ISBN 978-0-06-235484-6
- Noisy Night, illus. Brian Biggs (Roaring Book Press, Mar. 7, 2017). ISBN 978-1-59643-967-2
- Places to Be, illus. Renata Liwska (Balzer + Bray, Apr. 4, 2017). ISBN 978-0-06-228621-5
- I Love You Like a Pig, illus. Greg Pizzoli (Balzer + Bray, Sep. 19, 2017). ISBN 978-0-06-235483-9
- The Wolf, the Duck, and the Mouse, illus. Jon Klassen (Candlewick Press, Oct. 10, 2017). ISBN 978-0-7636-7754-1
- The Important Thing About Margaret Wise Brown, illus. Sarah Jacoby (HarperCollins, May 21, 2019). ISBN 9780062393449
- Just Because, illus. Isabelle Arsenault (Candlewick Press, Sep. 10, 2019). ISBN 978-0-7636-9680-1
- Paolo, Emperor of Rome, illus. Claire Keane (Amulet Books, Mar. 31, 2020). ISBN 978-1-4197-4109-8
- A Polar Bear in the Snow, illus. Shawn Harris (Candlewick Press, Oct. 13, 2020). ISBN 978-1-5362-0396-7
- What Is Love?, illus. Carson Ellis (Chronicle Books, Dec. 28, 2021). ISBN 978-1-4521-7640-6
- John's Turn, illus. Kate Berube (Candlewick Press, Feb. 24, 2022). ISBN 978-1-5362-0395-0
- The Great Zapfino, illus. Marla Frazee (Simon & Schuster, Apr. 5, 2022). ISBN 978-1-5344-1154-8
- The Three Billy Goats Gruff, Illus. Jon Klassen. (Orchard Books, Oct. 18, 2022). ISBN 978-1-338-67384-5
- Twenty Questions, illus. Christian Robinson (Candlewick Press, Mar. 14, 2023). ISBN 978-1-5362-1513-7
- How Does Santa Go Down the Chimney, illus. Jon Klassen (Candlewick Press, Sep. 12, 2023). ISBN 978-1-5362-2376-7
- Santa's First Christmas, illus. Sydney Smith (Viking Books, Oct. 22, 2024). ISBN 978-0-593-52497-8
- Rumpelstiltskin, illus. Carson Ellis (Orchard Books, Feb. 3, 2026). ISBN 978-1-338-67385-2
- The Future Book, illus. Shawn Harris (Random House, Mar. 3, 2026). ISBN 979-8-217-03317-1

=== Graphic novels ===
- The First Cat in Space - By Mac Barnett, with illustrations by Shawn Harris (HarperAlley)
1. The First Cat in Space Ate Pizza (May 10, 2022). ISBN 978-0-06-308409-4
2. The First Cat in Space and the Soup of Doom (Oct. 3, 2023). ISBN 978-0-06-308411-7
3. The First Cat in Space and the Wrath of the Paperclip (Nov. 5, 2024). ISBN 978-0-06-331528-0
4. The First Cat in Space and the Baby Pirate’s Revenge (Nov. 4, 2025). ISBN 978-0-06-341550-8

=== Short fiction ===
- "Best of Friends", Funny Business (Guys Read, 1), ed. Jon Scieszka (NY: Walden Pond Press, Sep. 22, 2010). OCLC 758985737

== Awards ==
- 2013 Winner, E. B. White Read Aloud Award
- 2013 Honor, Caldecott Medal (Author)
- 2015 Winner, E.B. White Read Aloud Award
- 2015 Honor, Caldecott Medal (Author)
- 2015 Winner, Irma Black Award
- 2018 Winner, E.B. White Read Aloud Award
- 2020 Winner, Picture Book Category of the German Youth Literature Awards for the 2020 one-volume German edition of his trilogy "Triangle", "Square", and "Circle"
