= Don Tate =

American writer (born 1963)

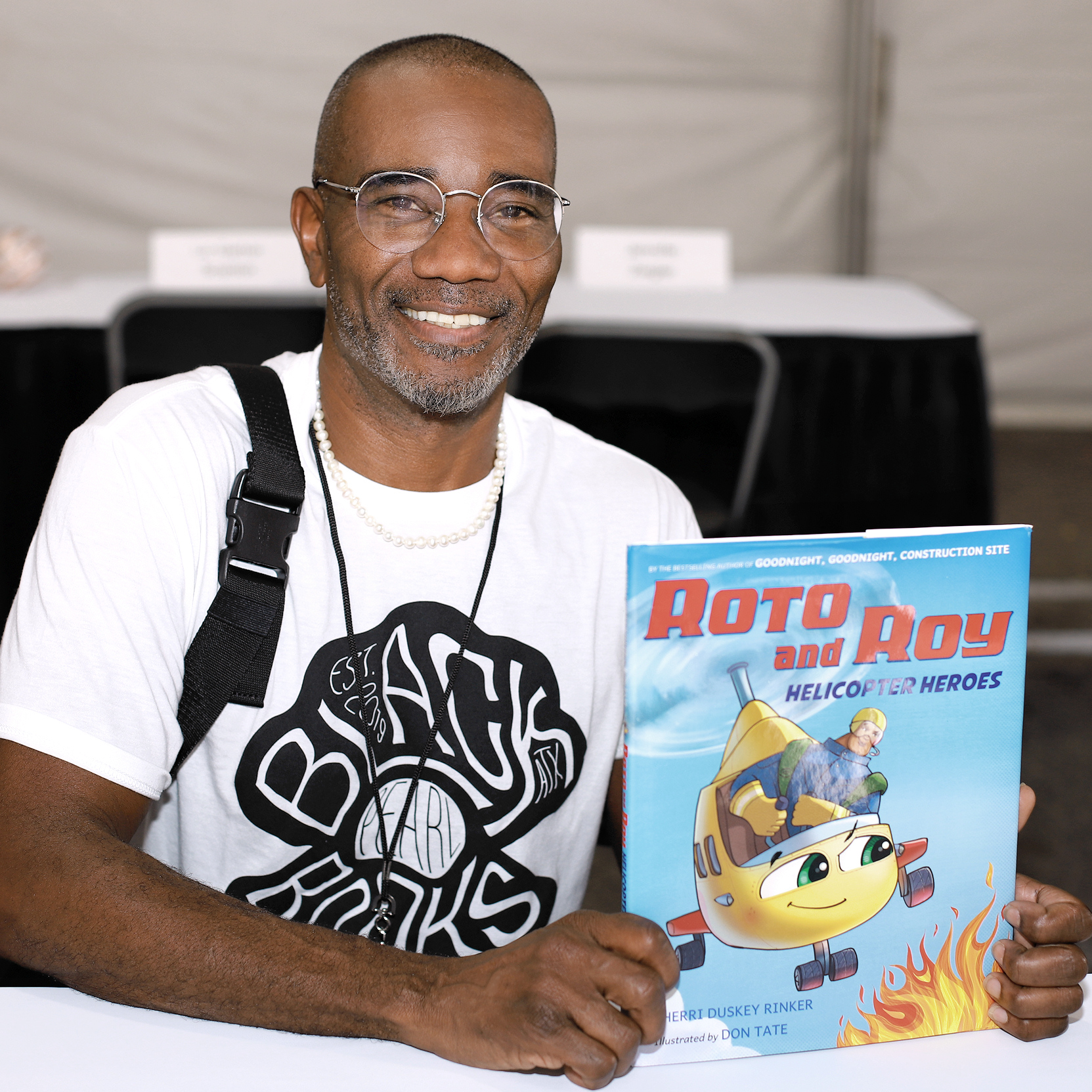
- Tate at the 2022 Texas Book Festival
- Born: December 21, 1963 (age 62)
- Occupations: Illustrator, author
- Writing career
- Genres: Children's books, African-American literature
- Notable works: Say Hey, A Song of Willie Mays; It Jes’ Happened: When Bill Traylor Started to Draw; Poet: The Remarkable Story of George Moses Horton
- Website: dontate.com

Don Tate (born December 21, 1963) is an American author and illustrator of books for children. Tate creates both fiction and nonfiction picture books, with a focus on the biographies of little-known historical figures. He is also a strong advocate for more literature that reflects and honors the lives of all young people. He notes that as a child he had to read the encyclopedia to discover a multicultural world; based on the children's books of his day he "thought the world was white". He co-founded the Brown Bookshelf, a blog designed to push the awareness of African Americans writing and illustrating books for young people. Tate also assisted in the #WeNeedDiverseBooks campaign to help put more books featuring diverse characters into the hands of readers.

== Career ==
Tate began his career as an illustrator with Say Hey: A Song of Willie Mays (Jump at the Sun/Hyperion, 2000), written by Peter Mandel.

His first book as an author, It Jes’ Happened: When Bill Traylor Started to Draw, illustrated by R. Gregory Christie, was published by Lee & Low Books in 2012. It is a "captivating" biography of folk artist Bill Traylor, a former slave. The book received numerous awards such as a Lee & Low New Voices Honor Award and an Ezra Jack Keats New Writer Honor. It was selected as a Kirkus Best Children’s Books List Selection, a Booklist Editors’ Choice, 2012, and a New York Public Library Top 100 Titles for Reading and Sharing as well as one of Bank Street College of Education Best Children’s Books of the Year, 2012.

Tate's 2015 illustrated picture book Poet: The Remarkable Story of George Moses Horton tells the story of the 19th century slave in Chatham County, North Carolina who subsequently became the first African American in the Southern United States to write a book. Tate was inspired to write about Horton via a friend; he researched his life in the University of North Carolina archives. The Wilson Library at UNC hosted the national launch of the book on September 3, 2015. A review in the School Library Journal called the book "A lovely introduction to an inspirational American poet." The Boston Globe called it "a moving biography of a slave who taught himself to read using a discarded spelling book". In 2016, Tate won an Ezra Jack Keats Book Award, A Christopher, and a Texas Institute of Letters book prize.

Tate was the recipient of the Texas Book Festival's Texas Writer Award in 2021, and was inducted into the Texas Institute of Letters in 2022.

In his work, Tate often writes about historical figures who persisted during the period of American slavery. In the New York Times article "'A Fine Dessert': Judging a Book by the Smile of a Slave," Tate was quoted on the topic, saying, "children's books needed to show a range of experience, including suffering and enduring." In 2016 television segment of Texas Country Reporter, Tate spoke about his work with stories of enslaved people and preserving these important narratives, stating the importance of telling children the truth and not sugar coating history.

== Bibliography ==
=== Author ===
- Jerry Changed The Game: How Engineer Jerry Lawson Revolutionized Video Games Forever. Simon & Schuster. 2023
- Pigskins to Paintbrushes: The Story of Football-Playing Artist Ernie Barnes. Abrams. 2021
- William Still And His Freedom Stories: The Father of the Underground Railroad. Peachtree Publishers. 2020
- Strong As Sandow: How Eugen Sandow Became The Strongest Man On Earth. Charlesbridge Publishing. 2017
- It Jes’ Happened: When Bill Traylor Started to Draw, illustrated by R. Gregory Christie. Lee & Low Books. 2012
- Poet: The Remarkable Story of George Moses Horton. Peachtree Publishers. 2015 (for which Tate won the Carter G. Woodson Book Award)

=== Illustrator ===
- The Day Madear Voted (Nancy Paulsen Books, 2024), written by Wade Hudson.
- Roto and Roy: To The Rescue (Little Brown, 2023), written by Sherri Duskey Rinker.
- Roto and Roy: Helicopter Heroes (Little Brown, 2022), written by Sherri Duskey Rinker.
- Swish! The Slam-Dunking, Alley-Ooping, High-Flying Harlem Globetrotters (Little Brown, 2020), written by Suzanne Slade.
- Carter Reads The Newspaper (Peachtree Publishers, Feb 1. 2019), written by Deborah Hopkinson. The Story of Carter G. Woodson, "Father of Black History.".
- No Small Potatoes: Junius G. Groves and His Kingdom in Kansas (Random House Children’s Books / Alfred A. Knopf BFYR), October. 2018), written by Tonya Bolden. Named a Notable Social Studies Trade Books for Young People, 2019, assembled in cooperation with the Children’s Book Council (CBC).
- Stalebread Charlie and the Razzy Dazzy Spasm Band (Clarion Books, July 10. 2018), written by Michael Mahin.
- Par-Tay! Dance of the Veggies (And Their Friends) (Alazar, April 1. 2018), written by Eloise Greenfield.
- Whoosh! Lonnie Johnson's Super-Soaking Stream on Inventions (Charlesbridge, May. 2016), written by Chris Barton. A Junior Library Guild Selection, 2016.
- The Amazing Age of John Roy Lynch (Eerdmans Publishing, April. 2015), written by Chris Barton. A review in the School Library Journal said Tate was "the best possible artist for this story."
- The Cart That Carried Martin (Charlesbridge, Aug. 2013), written by Eve Bunting. A Junior Library Guild Selection, 2013.
- Hope’s Gift (Putnam Juvenile, 2012), written by Kelly Starling Lyons. A Winter/Spring Okra Pick by Southern Independent Booksellers Alliance (SIBA).
- Duke Ellington’s Nutcracker Suite (Charlesbridge, 2011), written by Anna Harwell Celenza. (Recognized in the New York Times and Los Angeles Times holiday guides.)
- She Loved Baseball: The Effa Manley Story (HarperCollins, 2010), written by Audrey Vernick. A Junior Library Guild selection. School Library Journal said, "Both author and illustrator are on top of their games as they bring this inspiring story to life.” She Loved Baseball was honored by the Bank Street College of Education as a Best Children’s Books of the Year.
- Ron’s Big Mission (Dutton, 2009), written by Rose Blue and Corrine Naden, is a Junior Library Guild spring 2009 selection. The book tells the story of how future astronaut Ronald McNair, when he was 9 years old, challenged the whites-only policy of his town's public library.
- I Am My Granda's Enkelin (Paraclete Press, 2007), written by Walter Wangerin Jr.
- The Hidden Feast (August House, 2006), written by Mitch Weiss and Martha Hamilton.
- Sure As Sunrise: Stories of Bruh Rabbit & His Walkin' Talkin' Friends (Houghton Mifflin, 2004), written by Alice McGill. Honored in 2005 with an Aesop Accolade Award from the American Folklore Society.
- Black All Around! (Lee & Low Books, 2003), written by Patricia Hubbell.
- The Legend of the Valentine: An Inspirational Story of Love and Reconciliation (Zondervan, 2002), written by Katherine Grace Bond.
- Summer Sun Risin’ (Lee & Low Books, 2002). Honored by the Bank Street College of Education as “Best Children’s Books of the Year for 2002.” It also received a Children’s Crown Award, 2003 by the National Christian School Association Master List.
- Say Hey! A Song of Willie Mays (Hyperion Books for Children, 2000), written by Peter Mandell.

=== Short stories and essays ===
- Macaroni and Cheese — with Ketchup, in Cookin' 'N Bookin' Texas Style, written by Tara Henderson Forrest, published by the Texas State Reading Association, Jan. 2004.
- Stolen Jeans, Smoke Rings, and Self-Esteem in Dear Teen Me: Authors Write Letters to Their Teen Selves, edited by Miranda Kenneally and E. Kristin Anderson, published by Zest Books, Oct. 2012.
- Dance Like You Draw in Been There, Done That: School Dazed, edited by Mike Winchell, published by Grosset & Dunlap, August 23, 2016.
- Wiz Kid in Been There, Done That: School Dazed, edited by Mike Winchell, published by Grosset & Dunlap, August 23, 2016.
- The Talk: Conversations about Race, Love & Truth (Yearling, 2021), edited by Wade Hudson and Cheryl Hudson.
- Recognize: An Anthology Honoring and Amplifying Black Life(Crown Books for Young Readers, 2021), edited by Wade Hudson and Cheryl Hudson.

== Other activities ==
In addition to children’s books, Tate also licenses his art to product manufacturers. KIDZ is a line of juvenile bed and bathroom products including wallpaper, light switches, wall art and drawer knobs. He also has a line of children’s textile/fabric available at specialty fabric shops, which feature his designs. My Peepz, a group of African American characters, is marketed to tweeners and has been successful in the calendar market. Tate created the calendars due to a lack of African Americans on existing products.

Tate speaks at schools, public libraries and writing conferences, including the Vermont College of Fine Arts; Texas Writer’s League; Society of Children’s Book Writers and Illustrators; Pathways to Literacy Conferences(International Institute of Literacy Learning).

Tate has been a featured illustrator/speaker/exhibitor at various literary festivals, including the Texas Book Festival, The Savannah Children’s Book Festival, The Dallas Children’s Book and Literary Festival, Bookamania (Chicago Public Library), and such conferences as: The International Reading Association; Texas Library Association Black Caucus Roundtable and The National Alliance of Black School Educators.

== Personal ==
He and his family live in Austin, Texas.
