= The Terrible Two (book series) =

Book series by Jory John and Mac Barnett

- The Terrible Two (2015); The Terrible Two Get Worse (2016); The Terrible Two Go Wild (2018); The Terrible Two’s Last Laugh (2018)
- Author: Jory John; Mac Barnett
- Illustrator: Kevin Cornell
- Language: English
- Genre: Comedy
- Publisher: Harry N. Abrams
- Published: 2015-2018
- No. of books: 4
- Website: http://terribletwo.com/

The Terrible Two is a series of four novels aimed at tweeners. The two protagonists are Miles Murphy and Niles Sparks, who are in the same grade at the Yawnee Valley Science and Letters Academy. It is the local public school in Yawnee Valley, a town in a country area where the main industry appears to be dairy cattle. Originally rivals, Miles and Niles discover that they have a shared love of pranking, and begin to institute elaborate pranks, often aimed at the principal of the Yawnee Valley Science and Letters Academy, Barry Barkin.

The series was written by Jory John and Mac Barnett, illustrated by Kevin Cornell, and published by Harry N. Abrams. The four books in the series are: The Terrible Two (2015), The Terrible Two Get Worse (2016), The Terrible Two Go Wild (2018), and The Terrible Two's Last Laugh (2018).

== The Terrible Two ==
The Terrible Two is a book in the series. It introduces Miles Murphy, who has recently moved to Yawnee Valley with his mother. Miles is upset about the move, away from his former town and school where he had established his reputation as a prankster. On his first day of school, he meets Niles Sparks, an extremely well-behaved student who has earned the title of "school helper" from Principal Barkin. Barkin is the victim of an elaborate prank on the first day of school and blames Miles, without any proof. Miles gradually realizes that behind the facade of good behavior, Niles is a committed prankster. They eventually team up, with Niles having considerable planning abilities, and Miles having a strong skill at improvisation, when a prank looks like it may be about to be detected. The book finishes with an elaborate prank on Principal Barkin, and his son, Josh Barkin.

Josh is the school bully and class president. He is opposed by Holly, a bright student who regularly runs in opposition to Josh for the class president. She is skeptical of Niles's excessively good behavior, and befriends Miles, who is an outsider. She gradually realizes that Miles and Niles have become friends and is somewhat puzzled, as Niles and Miles seem completely different in attitudes.

The Terrible Two received positive reviews from Publishers Weekly, Booklist, Kirkus Reviews, and The Guardian, as well as the following accolades:

- E.B. White Read-Aloud Award Honor Book (2015)
- Texas Bluebonnet Award Nominee (2017)
- Pennsylvania Young Readers' Choice Award Nominee for Grades 3-6 (2017)
- Dorothy Canfield Fisher Children's Book Award (2017)
- The Magnolia Award Nominee for 3-5 (2017)
- Bluestem Book Award Nominee (2018)

The audiobook, released January 12, 2015 and voiced by Adam Verner, received a starred review from Booklist.

== The Terrible Two Get Worse ==
The Terrible Two Get Worse is the second book in the series. Barry Barkin has lost his position as principal because of the fiasco at the end of the first book. He has been replaced by his father, Former Principal Barkin, who comes out of retirement to try to restore order at Yawneee Valley Science and Letters Academy. Niles and Miles continue their pranking ways, but find that Former Principal Barkin is a more formidable opponent than Barry Barkin had been.

The Terrible Two Get Worse was published January 11, 2016, and a Spanish-language edition of the book, titled Bromas Pesadas S.A. Aun Peor, was released March 15, 2017. The book is a New York Times Bestseller and received positive reviews from Kirkus Reviews, Booklist, and School Library Journal.

== The Terrible Two Go Wild ==
The Terrible Two Go Wild, the third book in the series, cover the adventures of Niles and Miles during summer vacation. They are camping in the country outside Yawnee Valley. Barry Barkin is also on vacation, taking nature walks in the same area. Josh Barkin is leading a small group of scouts in the same area, notably buying a few medals and putting it on his T shirt. It was published January 8, 2018.

== The Terrible Two's Last Laugh ==
The Terrible Two's Last Laugh was published January 14, 2019.
