= Adam Gidwitz =

American children's author

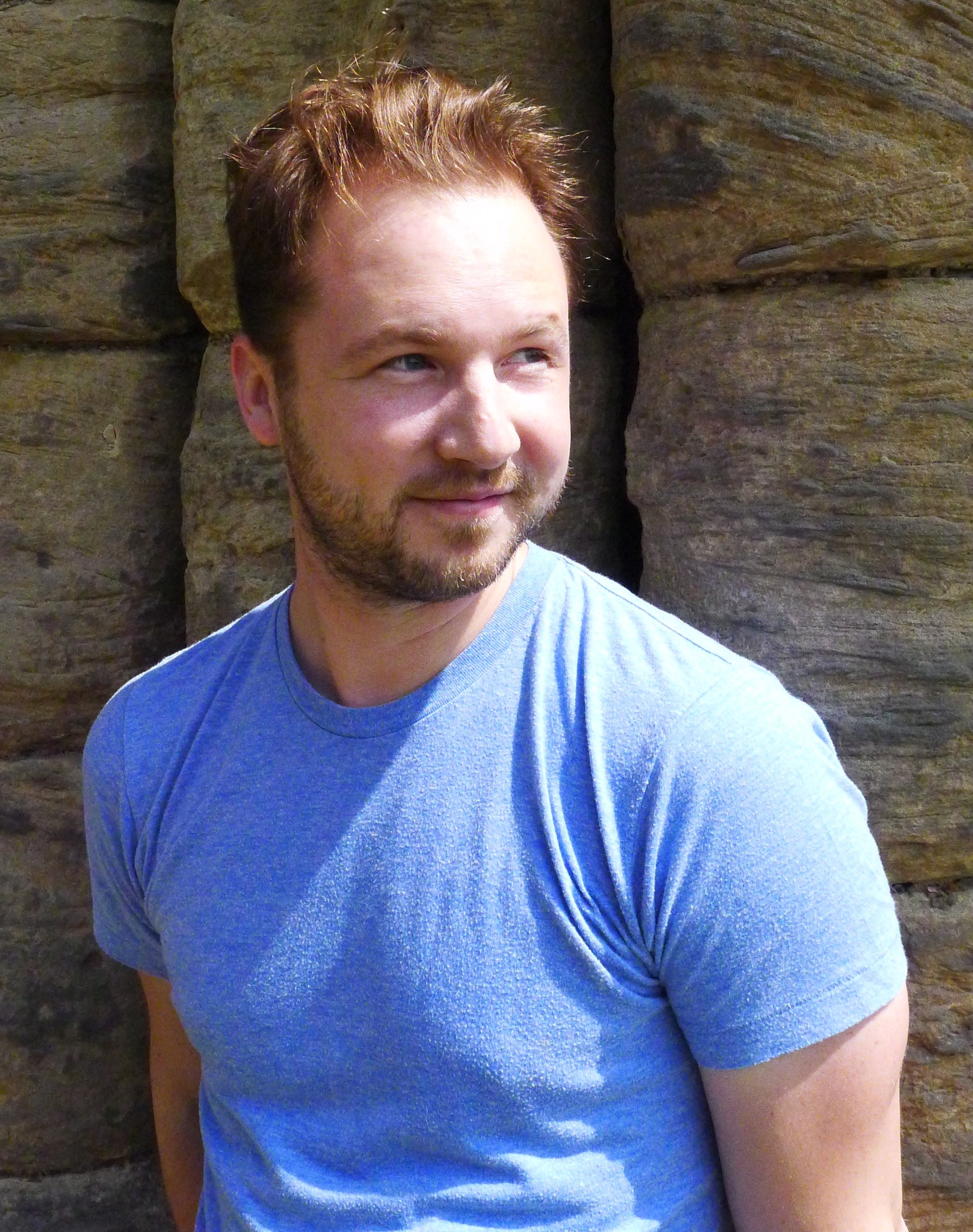
- Born: February 14, 1982 (age 44); San Francisco, CA
- Education: Columbia University; Bank Street College of Education
- Occupation: Author
- Spouse: Lauren Mancia (m. 2011)
- Writing career
- Period: 2011–present
- Genre: Children's literature
- Notable work: The Inquisitor's Tale
- Website: adamgidwitz.com

Adam Gidwitz (born February 14, 1982) is an American author of children's books, best known for A Tale Dark and Grimm (2010), In a Glass Grimmly (2012), and The Grimm Conclusion (2013). He received a 2017 Newbery Honor for The Inquisitor’s Tale: Or, The Three Magical Children and Their Holy Dog (2016). In 2021, his book A Tale Dark and Grimm was adapted into an animated miniseries on Netflix.

== Biography ==
He was born in San Francisco in 1982 but grew up in Baltimore, Maryland. His grandfather, Willard Gidwitz, was a president at Helene Curtis. Through his father's family, he is also related to Illinois GOP gubernatorial candidate and former ambassador Ronald Gidwitz.

He attended Columbia University, where he majored in English literature and spent his junior year abroad in the university's Oxford/Cambridge Scholars program.

After university, Gidwitz became a teacher at Saint Ann's School in Brooklyn. He credits a stint as a substitute librarian as the inspiration for writing The Grimm Trilogy.

In 2011, Gidwitz married Lauren Mancia, whom he met in university. They now live in Brooklyn, New York and Gidwitz writes full-time.

== Awards and honors ==
A Tale Dark and Grimm was named a New York Times Editor's Choice. Publishers Weekly, School Library Journal, and Shelf Awareness editor Jennifer M. Brown named it one of the best children's books of 2010. An animated series based on the book was one of the top ten most watched shows for kids on Netflix in October 2021.

The Inquisitor's Tale is a New York Times Bestselling book. Both and book and audiobook are Junior Library Guild selections. Kirkus Reviews, The New York Times, Publishers Weekly, School Library Journal, and The Washington Post named it one of the best children's books of 2016. Booklist included it on their 2016 "Top 10 Religion and Spirituality Books for Youth" and 2017 "Top 10 Historical Fiction for Youth" lists. They also included the audiobook edition on their 2017 "Top 10 Middle-Grade Fiction on Audio" and "Top 10 Youth Historical Fiction on Audio" lists. In 2019, Booklist included it on their list of the "50 Best Middle-Grade Novels of the 21st Century."

The first two books of The Unicorn Rescue Society were included on Booklist's 2018 "Audio Stars for Youth" and "Top 10 SF/Fantasy & Horror Audiobooks for Youth" lists. The Creature of the Pines is a Junior Library Guild book.

Awards for Gidwitz's books
Year	Title	Award	Result	Ref.
2011	A Tale Dark and Grimm	ALSC Notable Children's Books	Selection	
2011	A Tale Dark and Grimm	E.B. White Read-Aloud Award for Middle Reader	Honor	
2012	A Tale Dark and Grimm	Quick Picks for Reluctant Young Adult Readers	Selection	
2013	In a Glass Grimmly	Listen Up Awards	Shortlist	
2016	The Inquisitor's Tale	Booklist Editors' Choice: Books for Youth	Selection	
2016	The Inquisitor's Tale	Jewish Book Council Award for Children's Literature	Finalist	
2017	The Inquisitor's Tale	ALSC Notable Children's Books	Selection	
2017	The Inquisitor's Tale	Amazing Audiobooks for Young Adults	Selection	
2017	The Inquisitor's Tale	Booklist Editors' Choice: Audio for Youth	Selection	
2017	The Inquisitor's Tale	Charlotte Huck Award	Recommended	
2017	The Inquisitor's Tale	E.B. White Read-Aloud Award for Middle Grade	Finalist	
2017	The Inquisitor's Tale	Newbery Medal	Honor	
2017	The Inquisitor's Tale	Sydney Taylor Book Award for Older Readers	Winner	
2019	The Creature of the Pines	E.B. White Read-Aloud Award for Middle Grade	Finalist	
2021	The Madre de Aguas of Cuba	ALSC Notable Children's Recordings	Selection	

== Publications ==
=== Standalone books ===
- The Empire Strikes Back - So You Want to Be a Jedi. Los Angeles, Disney Lucasfilm Press, 2015.
- The Inquisitor’s Tale: Or, The Three Magical Children and Their Holy Dog. New York: Dutton Penguin, 2016.

=== Grimm trilogy ===
1. A Tale Dark and Grimm. New York: Dutton Penguin, 2010.
2. In a Glass Grimmly. New York: Dutton Penguin, 2012.
3. The Grimm Conclusion. New York: Dutton Penguin, 2013.

=== The Unicorn Rescue Society series ===
1. The Creature of the Pines, Illustrated by Hatem Aly. New York: Dutton Penguin, 2018.
2. The Basque Dragon. Co-authored by Jesse Casey. Illustrated by Hatem Aly. New York: Dutton Penguin, 2018.
3. Sasquatch and the Muckleshoot. Co-authored by Joseph Bruchac. Illustrated by Hatem Aly. New York: Dutton Penguin, 2018.
4. The Chupacabras of the Rio Grande. Co-authored by David Bowles. Illustrated by Hatem Aly. New York: Dutton Penguin, 2019.
5. The Madre de Aguas of Cuba. Co-authored by Emma Otheguy. Illustrated by Hatem Aly. New York: Dutton Penguin, 2020.

=== Operation Kinderspion duology ===
1. Max in the House of Spies. New York, Dutton Books for Young Readers, 2024.
2. Max in the Land of Lies. New York, Dutton Books for Young Readers, 2025.
