= The Inquisitor's Tale =

Young adult novel by Adam Gidwitz

The Inquisitor's Tale: Or, The Three Magical Children and Their Holy Dog
- Author: Adam Gidwitz
- Illustrator: Hatem Aly
- Cover artist: Hatem Aly
- Language: English
- Set in: 13th century France
- Publisher: Dutton Children's Books
- Publication date: September 27, 2016
- Pages: 384
- Awards: 2017 Newbery Honor
- ISBN: 9780142427378
- Website: Publisher's website

The Inquisitor's Tale: Or, The Three Magical Children and Their Holy Dog is a young adult novel written by Adam Gidwitz and illuminated (in the medieval sense) by Hatem Aly, published by Dutton Children's Books in 2016, and inspired by The Canterbury Tales. It is set in medieval France and describes how three magical children meet each other and become outlaws. It was named a Newbery Honor book in 2017.

== Plot summary ==
The novel is originally told by multiple narrators, all travelers at the Holy Cross-Roads Inn near Paris, set in early March 1242. Marie, a brewer from the town of Saint-Geneviève, starts the story of Jeanne and the greyhound Gwenforte. The second hero, William, is introduced by a monk who serves as the librarian at the Monastery Saint-Martin. Jacob, the third, is introduced by Aron, the butcher in Nogent-sur-Oise. Each narrator is prompted to tell their tale by their fellow travelers; as a framing device, the Inn sequences are told from the perspective of Étienne, an agent of the Pope's Holy Inquisition. Once the three children actually arrive at the inn, the person collecting their tale joins them and the rest of the story is in the present tense as the in-universe author experiences the events of the story for himself instead of hearing it at the inn.

The three children each have a different power. Jeanne is able to see the future, William has superhuman strength, and Jacob can heal almost any wound. They are pursued by King Louis IX and his agents after interfering with the events following Disputation of Paris, when hundreds of copies of the Talmud were burned.

== Development ==
Gidwitz is married to Lauren Mancia, a professor of medieval history at Brooklyn College. They travel to Europe every year for her research, where Gidwitz began to collect tales from medieval times, including an episode from the life of Saint Martha, who vanquished a flatulent dragon. He learned of the burning of the Talmuds in 1242 from a plaque in the Musée d'Art et d'Histoire du Judaïsme in Paris, and was further inspired by the Bayeux Tapestry.

== Critical reception ==
The Inquisitor's Tale was well received by critics, including starred reviews from Booklist, Kirkus Reviews, Publishers Weekly, School Library Journal, and Shelf Awareness.

Kirkus Review called the book "a masterpiece of storytelling that is addictive and engrossing."

Julia Smith, writing for Booklist, noted, "Gidwitz proves himself a nimble storyteller he weaves history, excitement, and multiple narrative threads into a taut, inspired adventure. Though final artwork was unseen, the book will be fittingly illuminated with illustrations and marginalia."

Publishers Weekly highlighted how "Gidwitz ... continues to toy with narrative in a well-researched and rambunctiously entertaining story that has as much to say about the present as it does the past. ... Amid mugs upon mugs of ale, the tale that comes into focus is one of religious persecution and faith, friendships that transcend difference, and a dangerously flatulent dragon."

School Library Journal wrote, "Mixing history an adventure, religion and humor, Gidwitz breathes new life into the Middle Ages and makes this time period accessible and exciting for middle grade listeners."

Shelf Awareness's Karin Snelson referred to the narrative style as "spendidly meandering" and filled with "over-the-top skirmishes, comical triumphs over thugs, unlikely allies, religious persecution, stinky French cheese ..., noble acts of bravery, deep-seated emotion, [and] profound theological questions." She also commented on Aly's illustrations, which "[illuminate] Gidwitz's story with whimsical black-and-white drawings that enliven this philosophical swashbuckler."

Common Sense Media gave the book five stars, calling it a "poignant, funny medieval tale skewers ignorance, bigotry."

The audiobook, which Gidwitz narrated himself, also received a starred review from Booklist, who wrote, "Gidwitz employs the vernacular to great linguistic effect in his exhortations to his fellow travelers."

== Awards and honors ==
The Inquisitor's Tale is a New York Times Bestselling book. Both the book and audiobook are Junior Library Guild selections.

Kirkus Reviews, The New York Times, Publishers Weekly, School Library Journal, and The Washington Post named it one of the best children's books of 2016. Booklist included it on their 2016 "Top 10 Religion and Spirituality Books for Youth" and 2017 "Top 10 Historical Fiction for Youth" lists. They also included the audiobook edition on their 2017 "Top 10 Middle-Grade Fiction on Audio" and "Top 10 Youth Historical Fiction on Audio" lists. In 2019, Booklist included it on their list of the "50 Best Middle-Grade Novels of the 21st Century."

Awards for The Inquisitor's Tale
Year	Result	Ref.
2016	Booklist Editors' Choice: Books for Youth	Selection
2016	Jewish Book Council Award for Children's Literature	Finalist
2017	ALSC Notable Children's Books	Selection
2017	Amazing Audiobooks for Young Adults	Selection
2017	Booklist Editors' Choice: Audio for Youth	Selection
2017	Charlotte Huck Award	Recommended
2017	E.B. White Read-Aloud Award for Middle Grade	Finalist
2017	Newbery Medal	Honor
2017	Sydney Taylor Book Award for Older Readers	Winner
