= What Is Love? (picture book) =

2021 picture book by Mac Barnett, illustrated by Carson Ellis

- Author: Mac Barnett
- Illustrator: Carson Ellis
- Language: English
- Genre: Picture book
- Publisher: Chronicle Books, San Francisco
- Publication date: December 28, 2021
- Publication place: United States
- Pages: 44
- ISBN: 978-1-4521-7640-6

What Is Love? is a 2021 picture book written by Mac Barnett and illustrated by Carson Ellis. It tells the story of a boy who wants to know the meaning of love, and so is advised by his grandmother to ask the people around him.

== Reception ==
The Horn Book Magazine praised the illustrations by Carson Ellis, mentioning the "subtle details" and her "distinctive hand-lettering." They called Mac Barnett's writing "moving, but never cloying," and concluded the review by calling the book "[w]holly lovable." Reviewing for The Booklist, Lucinda Whitehurst called the prose in What is Love? "lovely and lyrical," and noted how the words and pictures "work together to create layers of thought and understanding."

A review for the School Library Journal comment on the wide appeal of the book, saying "short, repetitive phrases help young children connect to the text, while the depth of the subject matter resonates with older readers." Kirkus Reviews said the watercolor illustrations gave "the impression of a collection of still lives rather than an immersive journey." They concluded by calling it a nice book, but not ground—breaking. Publishers Weekly's review praised Ellis' illustrations, but also noted they didn't always match with the humor of some parts of the book.
