= The Clock Without a Face =

Book by Mac Barnett and Eli Horowitz

The Clock Without A Face
- The book is shaped like a house
- Author: Eli Horowitz, Mac Barnett
- Illustrator: Scott Teplin
- Genre: Mystery, Puzzle book
- Publisher: McSweeney's
- Publication date: May 2010
- Media type: Print (Board book)
- Pages: 30
- ISBN: 978-1-934781-71-5

The Clock Without a Face is a puzzle book by Eli Horowitz and Mac Barnett with illustrations by Scott Teplin. It was published in 2010 by McSweeney's. The plot of the book revolves around the theft of 12 jeweled numbers from the face of the Emerald Khroniker, a cursed clock, with clues to the thief's identity and the whereabouts of the numbers included throughout the text and in accompanying pictures. The identity of the thieves is revealed on the last page, but the location of the treasure is not. The authors hid 12 actual emerald-studded numbers (crafted by Anna Sheffield) in locations around the United States, and readers are encouraged to search for them using the clues in the book.
