= Ryan T. Higgins =

American author of children's books

- Occupations: Author and illustrator
- Writing career
- Genre: Children's books
- Notable awards: The E.B. White Read Aloud Award (2016, 2019)
- Website: ryanthiggins.com

Ryan T. Higgins is an American author and illustrator of children's books. He is best known for his Mother Bruce and Penelope Rex series, both of which have had a book on The New York Times Best Seller List and have won the E. B. White Read Aloud Award for Picture Books.

== Biography ==
Higgins graduated from the College of the Atlantic in 2006. He is married and has three children. As of 2021, he lives in Maine.

== Influences ==
Higgins was greatly inspired by Calvin and Hobbes comics when he was younger and initially wanted to become a comic writer; however, after seeing Mo Willems's Don't Let the Pigeon Drive the Bus! at a friend's home, he became intrigued by the genre. He was inspired to write We Don't Eat Our Classmates when his son was preparing for kindergarten.

== Awards and honors ==
Mother Bruce was a New York Times bestseller. Kirkus Reviews included it on their list of the best children's books of 2015.

We Don't Eat Our Classmates was a New York Times and IndieBound bestseller. Kirkus Reviews included it on their list of the best children's books of 2018.

What About Worms?! was a 2021 ALSC Notable Children's Book for Younger Readers.

Awards
Year	Title	Award	Result	Ref.
2016	Mother Bruce	E.B. White Read Aloud Award for Picture Books	Winner	
2016	Mother Bruce	Ezra Jack Keats Book Award for Illustrator	Honoree	
2017	Be Quiet!	Goodreads Choice Award for Best Picture Books	Nominee	
2018	We Don't Eat Our Classmates	Goodreads Choice Award for Best Picture Books	Nominee	
2018–2019	Mother Bruce	California Young Reader Medal for Primary	Nominee	
2019	We Don't Eat Our Classmates	Bank Street College of Education Cook Prize	Honoree	
2019	We Don't Eat Our Classmates	Charlotte Zolotow Award	Commended	
2019	We Don't Eat Our Classmates	E. B. White Read Aloud Award for Picture Books	Winner	
2019	We Don't Eat Our Classmates	Irma Black Award	Finalist	
2020	We Will Rock Our Classmates	Goodreads Choice Award for Best Picture Books	Nominee	
2021	What About Worms?!	Geisel Award	Honoree	
2023	Hey, Bruce!: An Interactive Book	Eisner Award for Best Publication for Early Readers	Nominee	
2023	We Don't Eat Our Classmates	California Young Reader Medal for Primary	Winner	

== Publications ==
=== Mother Bruce series ===
- Mother Bruce (2015)
- Hotel Bruce (2016)
- Bruce's Big Move (2017)
- Santa Bruce (2018)
- 1 Grumpy Bruce (2019)
- Bruce's Big Fun Day (2019)
- Bruce's Big Storm (2019)
- Peek-a-Bruce (2019)
- The Bruce Swap (2021)
- Thanks for Nothing (2021)
- Spring Stinks (2021)
- Ballet Bruce (2022)
- Hey, Bruce!: An Interactive Book (2022)

=== Penelope Rex series ===
- We Don't Eat Our Classmates (2018)
- We Will Rock Our Classmates (2020)
- We Don't Lose Our Class Goldfish (2023)
- Penelope Rex and the Problem with Pets (2024)
- “Bundle up, Penelope Rex” (2025)

=== Stand alone books ===
- Twaddleton's Cheese (2008)
- Roger Goes Up (2012)
- Wilfred (2013)
- This Book Does Not Have Words (2014)
- Be Quiet! (2017)
- What About Worms!? (2020)
- Norman Didn't Do It! (Yes He Did) (2021)
