= Sam and Dave Dig a Hole =

2014 children's book by Mac Barnett

Sam and Dave Dig A Hole
- Author: Mac Barnett
- Illustrator: Jon Klassen
- Language: English
- Genre: Children's literature
- Published: 2014 Candlewick Press
- Publication place: United States
- Media type: Picture book (hardcover)
- Pages: 40
- ISBN: 978-0763662295

Sam and Dave Dig a Hole is a children's book by author Mac Barnett and illustrator Jon Klassen. It was published by Candlewick in 2014 and was selected as a Caldecott Honor Book in 2015.

== Description ==
The story, written by Barnett is told in the present tense, from a third person narrative point of view. The book for the most part follows a layout of having the image on one page and having the accompanying text on the page next to it, with the exception of a few pages where the image extends to both pages. The book also greatly incorporates the use of white space.

== Plot ==
Two brothers named Sam and Dave, alongside their unnamed canine friend, have embarked on a journey to find something spectacular, "On Monday Sam and Dave dug a hole." They are determined in their search "We won't stop digging until we find something spectacular" and they proceed to dig through a vast distance. Along the way they dig past many jewels and potential "spectacular" objects, which notably enough only their dog seems to be aware of. The illustrations rely heavily on the positioning of the eyes to describe the relationship between the objects in the frame that are hidden to the boys but are aware to the dog, as shown in various frames such as on pages 8 and 10 the two brothers are shown to be fixated on the task at hand whereas the dog is focused more on the jewel that is nearby. They continue their journey, passing by many jewels along the way until they become too tired and decide to take a rest. The illustrations then depict the dog continuing to dig deeper in the ground until they all fall through the hole. "Sam and Dave fell down, down, down, until they landed in the soft dirt." The story concludes with them landing back into an area that looks like their original yard but is not their yard at all as shown by distinct differences in the frames from the 3 pages and the last 3 pages, such as the apple tree that is in their yard at the beginning of the story is replaced by a pear tree and the red flower that is on their porch in the beginning of the book is replaced by a blue flower at the end of the story.

== Critical reception ==
Sam and Dave Dig a Hole received positive reviews. Horn Book called it "Mind-blowing in the best way possible", Kirkus Reviews said it was "something spectacular". According to the Mac Barnett official webpage BuzzFeed lauded "This book is deadpan and dead awesome." A review by the ALSC stated "Readers will find an unexpected treasure and be challenged to ponder the meaning of 'spectacular.'"

== Awards ==
Following are a list of awards Sam and Dave Dig a Hole received

- Winner of the Caldecott Honor
- Winner of the E.B. White Read-Aloud Award
- Winner of the Irma Black Award
- Winner of the Wanda Gág Read Aloud Book Award
- A New York Times Best Seller
- A New York Times Notable Book
- A Washington Post Best Children's Book of 2014
- A PBS Best Picture Book of 2014
- A Guardian Best Book of 2014
- A Horn Book Fanfare Best Book of 2014
- A Kirkus Best Book of 2014
- A Publishers Weekly Best Book of 2014
- A Globe and Mail 100 Best Books of 2014 Selection
- A Huffington Post Best Picture Book of 2014
- A BuzzFeed Best Picture Book of 2014
- An Association for Library Service to Children Notables Selection
- A Toronto Public Library First & Best Book of 2014
- A Reading Today Best Picture Book of 2014
- A Junior Library Guild Selection
