= Leo: A Ghost Story =

2015 children's book

- Author: Mac Barnett
- Audio read by: Nicol Zanzarella
- Illustrator: Christian Robinson
- Cover artist: Robinson
- Language: English
- Genre: Children's book
- Published: 2015
- Publisher: Chronicle Books
- Publication place: United States
- Pages: 52
- ISBN: 9781452131566

Leo: A Ghost Story is a 2015 children's book written by Mac Barnett and illustrated by Christian Robinson. It is about a ghost named Leo, who leaves his long-time home after a new family moves in. He eventually finds a new home with Jane, a young girl who befriends him. A short film based on the book was released in 2017. It was animated by Galen Fott and narrated by Nicol Zanzarella.

== Reception ==
Leo: A Ghost Story was named a New York Times Best Illustrated Book in 2015.

Kirkus Reviews wrote: "Robinson creates a vintage 1950s-'60s feel, offering up a raw version of M. Sasek. Together, words and pictures construct a whimsical, delightful story that deeply respects the child. And in Jane, they create a brilliant heroine whose powers lie within her wit, her open mind, and her freedom of play."

Many reviews draw attention to the book's visual design. Erin Reilly-Sanders, writing for School Library Journal, notes: "Robinson solves the issue of a white ghost on a white page smartly by depicting Leo as a blue outline on white paper. Leo beautifully contrasts with the geometrically composed live humans, and Robinson finds some clever opportunities for depicting Leo’s transparency." Allison Barney, at The Horn Book Magazine, states: "Robinson utilizes spot illustrations as well as single- and double-page spreads to great effect. . . . The text placement, different on every page, takes illustrations and word flow into account, drawing readers' eyes so that they take in the story in its entirety."

Marjorie Ingall, writing for the New York Times, offers a summation of the book's central themes: "The story has a light touch, but there’s so much depth: a fearful ghost, a take-charge girl, an interracial friendship, and a tale in which fear is integrally and sweetly tied to positive qualities of imagination."
