= Sherri Duskey Rinker =

American author

- Rinker in 2022
- Occupation: Writer
- Writing career
- Language: English
- Genres: Picture book, middle grade fiction
- Notable works: Goodnight, Goodnight, Construction Site; Steam Train, Dream Train
- Website: www.sherririnker.com

Sherri Duskey Rinker is an American children's author from Illinois. Her works include the picture-book series Goodnight, Goodnight, Construction Site and Steam Train, Dream Train, and the middle-grade novels Revver the Speedway Squirrel and Revver the Speedway Squirrel: The Big Race Home.

== Biography ==
Rinker worked as a graphic designer before becoming known for children's books. In a 2013 interview, she cited childhood bedtime reading with her grandmother and Virginia Lee Burton's The Little House as early influences. Rinker lives in St. Charles, Illinois.

== Career ==
The idea for Goodnight, Goodnight, Construction Site grew out of a bedtime routine with one of Rinker's sons, who was interested in trucks. In fall 2009, Chronicle Books editor Mary Colgan found Rinker's unagented manuscript in a stack of submissions and acquired the book; Tom Lichtenheld was later selected as illustrator. Chronicle published Goodnight, Goodnight, Construction Site in 2011.

Rinker and Lichtenheld next collaborated on Steam Train, Dream Train, published by Chronicle in 2013, and later returned to the construction theme with Mighty, Mighty Construction Site, published in 2017. Publishers Weekly reported in 2017 that Goodnight, Goodnight, Construction Site had sold 1.3 million copies and had led to novelty spin-offs and a board-book edition. In 2022, Axios reported that the Goodnight, Goodnight, Construction Site series had sold more than five million copies and that the original book had stayed on The New York Times bestseller list for five years. On its 2019 National Book Festival author page, the Library of Congress described Goodnight, Goodnight, Construction Site, Steam Train, Dream Train, Mighty, Mighty Construction Site, and Construction Site on Christmas Night as No. 1 New York Times best-sellers.

Rinker's work also includes standalone picture books and books outside the Construction Site series. In 2016, she published Silly Wonderful You, illustrated by Patrick McDonnell, and she later published titles including The 12 Sleighs of Christmas, illustrated by Jake Parker, and Tiny and the Big Dig, illustrated by Matt Myers. In 2017, Houghton Mifflin Harcourt published Big Machines: The Story of Virginia Lee Burton, a picture-book biography written by Rinker and illustrated by John Rocco.

Later entries in the Goodnight, Goodnight, Construction Site series were illustrated by AG Ford, including Construction Site on Christmas Night, Construction Site: Three Cheers for Kid McGear!, and Construction Site Mission: Demolition!.

In 2020, Rinker moved into middle-grade fiction with Revver the Speedway Squirrel, illustrated by Alex Willan and published by Bloomsbury Children's Books. The sequel, Revver the Speedway Squirrel: The Big Race Home, was published in 2021. In 2022, she began the Roto and Roy picture-book series, illustrated by Don Tate, with Roto and Roy: Helicopter Heroes, published by Little, Brown Books for Young Readers.

== Awards and honors ==
Year	Award or honor	Category	Work	Result	Ref.
2011	The New York Times Notable Children's Books	Picture books	Goodnight, Goodnight, Construction Site	Selected	
2011	Foreword INDIES Book of the Year Awards	Picture Books (Children's)	Goodnight, Goodnight, Construction Site	Finalist	
2012	Association for Library Service to Children Notable Children's Books	Younger readers	Goodnight, Goodnight, Construction Site	Selected	
2013	School Library Journal Best Books	Picture books	Steam Train, Dream Train	Selected	
2013	Chicago Public Library Best Picture Books	Picture books	Steam Train, Dream Train	Selected	
2017	Cooperative Children's Book Center Choices	Picture-book biography	Big Machines: The Story of Virginia Lee Burton	Selected	

== Works ==
=== Goodnight, Goodnight, Construction Site series ===
==== Picture books ====
Year	Title	Illustrator	Publisher	Notes
2011	Goodnight, Goodnight, Construction Site	Tom Lichtenheld	Chronicle Books	Picture book
2017	Mighty, Mighty Construction Site	Tom Lichtenheld	Chronicle Books	Picture book
2018	Construction Site on Christmas Night	AG Ford	Chronicle Books	Picture book
2019	Construction Site: Three Cheers for Kid McGear!	AG Ford	Chronicle Books	Picture book
2020	Construction Site Mission: Demolition!	AG Ford	Chronicle Books	Picture book
2021	Construction Site: Road Crew, Coming Through!	AG Ford	Chronicle Books	Picture book
2022	Construction Site: Farming Strong, All Year Long	AG Ford	Chronicle Books	Picture book
2023	Construction Site: Taking Flight!	AG Ford	Chronicle Books	Picture book
2024	Construction Site: Garbage Crew to the Rescue!	AG Ford	Chronicle Books	Picture book
2026	Construction Site: Firefight!	AG Ford	Chronicle Books	Picture book
2026	Construction Site: Dad and His Crew Power Through!	AG Ford	Chronicle Books	Picture book

==== Board books and related books ====
Year	Title	Illustrator	Publisher	Notes
2017	Goodnight, Goodnight, Construction Site: Let's Go!	Tom Lichtenheld	Chronicle Books	Board book
2018	Cement Mixer's ABC	Ethan Long; based on illustrations by Tom Lichtenheld	Chronicle Books	Board book
2018	Dump Truck's Colors	Ethan Long; based on illustrations by Tom Lichtenheld	Chronicle Books	Board book
2019	Excavator's 123	Ethan Long; based on illustrations by Tom Lichtenheld	Chronicle Books	Board book
2019	Bulldozer's Shapes	Ethan Long; based on illustrations by Tom Lichtenheld	Chronicle Books	Board book
2019	Crane Truck's Opposites	Ethan Long; based on illustrations by Tom Lichtenheld	Chronicle Books	Board book
2021	Construction Site Merry and Bright	AG Ford	Chronicle Books	Lift-the-flap book
2022	Construction Site Spring Delight	AG Ford	Chronicle Books	Lift-the-flap book
2022	Construction Site Gets a Fright!	AG Ford	Chronicle Books	Lift-the-flap book
2022	Construction Site: You're Just Right	AG Ford	Chronicle Books	Lift-the-flap book
2024	Construction Site: A Thankful Night	Helen Morgan	Chronicle Books	Lift-the-flap book
2025	Construction Site Hanukkah Lights	Shawna J. C. Tenney	Chronicle Books	Lift-the-flap board book
2026	Goodnight, Goodnight, Construction Site Sticker & Activity Book	Helen Morgan	Chronicle Books	Sticker and activity book

=== Steam Train, Dream Train series ===
Year	Title	Illustrator	Publisher	Notes
2013	Steam Train, Dream Train	Tom Lichtenheld	Chronicle Books	Picture book
2016	Steam Train, Dream Train 1-2-3	Tom Lichtenheld	Chronicle Books	Board book
2016	Steam Train, Dream Train Colors	Tom Lichtenheld	Chronicle Books	Board book
2025	Steam Train, Dream Train: Next Stop, Christmas!	AG Ford	Chronicle Books	Picture book

=== Roto and Roy series ===
Year	Title	Illustrator	Publisher	Notes
2022	Roto and Roy: Helicopter Heroes	Don Tate	Little, Brown Books for Young Readers	Picture book
2023	Roto and Roy: To the Rescue!	Don Tate	Little, Brown Books for Young Readers	Picture book

=== Revver the Speedway Squirrel series ===
Year	Title	Illustrator	Publisher	Notes
2020	Revver the Speedway Squirrel	Alex Willan	Bloomsbury Children's Books	Middle-grade novel
2021	Revver the Speedway Squirrel: The Big Race Home	Alex Willan	Bloomsbury Children's Books	Middle-grade novel

=== Other books ===
Year	Title	Illustrator	Publisher	Notes
2016	Silly Wonderful You	Patrick McDonnell	Balzer + Bray	Picture book
2017	Big Machines: The Story of Virginia Lee Burton	John Rocco	Houghton Mifflin Harcourt	Picture-book biography
2017	The 12 Sleighs of Christmas	Jake Parker	Chronicle Books	Picture book
2018	Tiny and the Big Dig	Matt Myers	Scholastic Press	Picture book
2019	Celebrate You!	A. N. Kang	Balzer + Bray	Picture book
2020	How to Put an Octopus to Bed	Viviane Schwarz	Chronicle Books	Picture book
2021	It's So Quiet: A Not-Quite-Going-to-Bed Book	Tony Fucile	Chronicle Books	Picture book
2022	Joy Ride	Ana Ramírez González	Candlewick Press	Picture book

== Adaptations and other media ==
Weston Woods Studios adapted Goodnight, Goodnight, Construction Site as an animated short and audio recording in 2012, narrated by Dion Graham with music by Jon Carroll. Oceanhouse Media released interactive storybook-app editions of Goodnight, Goodnight, Construction Site and Steam Train, Dream Train.

Bay Area Children's Theatre adapted the book as Goodnight, Goodnight, Construction Site-The Musical, with book, music, and lyrics by Austin Zumbro. The production won six 2016 Theatre Bay Area Awards, including Outstanding Production of a Musical, Outstanding Direction of a Musical, and Outstanding World Premiere Musical. In 2019, Bay Area Children's Theatre presented Construction Site on Christmas Night, a musical with book and lyrics by Min Kahng and Austin Zumbro and music by Daniel Mertzlufft, based on Rinker's book illustrated by AG Ford.

Actor Chris Evans read Goodnight, Goodnight, Construction Site on the BBC children's program CBeebies Bedtime Stories in 2017. In 2022, Caterpillar released "Cat Trial 13: Goodnight, Goodnight, Construction Site", a live-action branded video that used Caterpillar equipment to portray the book's construction vehicles and was narrated by Matt Dillon.

In 2019, San Antonio councilman John Courage used the title "Goodnight, Goodnight Construction Site" for a proposal to limit overnight construction noise near homes; the city council approved related code changes in 2022.
