= Ophelia and the Marvelous Boy =

Book by Karen Foxlee

- First edition cover of Ophelia and the Marvelous Boy
- Author: Karen Foxlee
- Illustrator: Yoko Tanaka
- Language: English
- Genre: Fantasy novel
- Publisher: Alfred A. Knopf
- Publication date: 2014
- Publication place: United States
- Media type: Print
- Pages: 228
- ISBN: 978-0-385-75354-8
- LC Class: PZ7.F841223Oph 2014

Ophelia and the Marvelous Boy is a 2014 middle-grade fantasy novel by Australian author Karen Foxlee. The novel is a loose retelling of the 1844 Hans Christian Andersen story "The Snow Queen".

== Plot ==
Ophelia Jane Worthington-Whittard is a scientifically-minded English girl whose mother has recently died. Ophelia's father, an international sword expert, has temporarily moved Ophelia and her older sister Alice to an unnamed northern European city where he is curating an important museum exhibit. The head curator at the museum is Miss Kaminski, a beautiful woman with blonde hair who often wears white clothing. However, she is cold and unkind to Ophelia.

While her father is working on the exhibit, Ophelia is mostly left alone to wander through the mysterious old museum. One day, she finds a small room with a faded mural of a boy with a sword, captioned "The Marvelous Boy". Hidden in the mural is a small door and when Ophelia peers through the keyhole, she discovers that someone is looking back at her from the other side of the door. The boy on the other side of the door tells Ophelia that he was sent from another world, centuries ago, to defeat the Snow Queen, but that she imprisoned him, instead. The boy's name was taken from him by a group of wizards so that it could not be used against him and he was put under a spell of protection that magically extended his life, but the spell is about to wear off and the Snow Queen will be able to kill him when it does.

The boy tells Ophelia that she must complete a number of tasks, including finding the key that unlocks his door and finding a sword that can kill the Snow Queen. Ophelia sets out to complete these tasks without being caught by Miss Kaminski or the museum guards. As she begins to complete the tasks, she hears her dead mother's voice offering her advice and encouragement. Meanwhile, Alice begins to admire Miss Kaminski's beauty and fashion sense and begins dressing and acting more like her.

Ophelia discovers that Miss Kaminski is the actually Snow Queen in disguise. She intends to kill Alice and turn her into a ghost in order to feed off her strength. Ophelia finds the key to the boy's door, but discovers that he is partly transparent and in danger of disappearing, entirely. The snow queen finds him and leaves him outside, where he almost dies. Ophelia and the boy are chased by wolves. Ophelia finds the sword and kills the Snow Queen. The boy tells Ophelia that he is going to return to land and the town where he grew up and he fades away, his mission completed. Ophelia, her father, and her sister return home.

== Major themes ==
Navigating loss and grief are major themes in this novel, with Ophelia having lost her mother and the boy having lost everything he ever knew, including his name. On the subject, Foxlee has said "Grief is devastating, but it can also give you the chance to change your destiny."

== Background ==
This story began with the idea of a boy imprisoned in a museum. The characters of Ophelia and the Snow Queen were added to the story later. Foxlee had grown up listening to Hans Christian Andersen fairy tales as a child and she was fascinated by the Snow Queen as a villain. She also felt a connection to the Nordic setting of the original fairy tale because her grandparents had emigrated from Finland to Australia. The museum in the novel was inspired by many different museums, including the Hermitage Museum in Saint Petersburg, Russia.

== Reception ==
Ophelia and the Marvelous Boy received starred reviews in Kirkus Reviews, Publishers Weekly, Booklist, The Bulletin, and School Library Journal. Publishers Weekly described the writing as "elegant and accessible, with a pervading melancholy." Kirkus Reviews called the novel "A well-wrought, poignant and original reworking of Andersen's 'The Snow Queen.'" It was also included on the "Best Books of 2014" lists from Publishers Weekly and School Library Journal, and on the "Best Children's Books of 2014" list from the Wall Street Journal.
