= Emily Winfield Martin =

American artist and author-illustrator of children's books

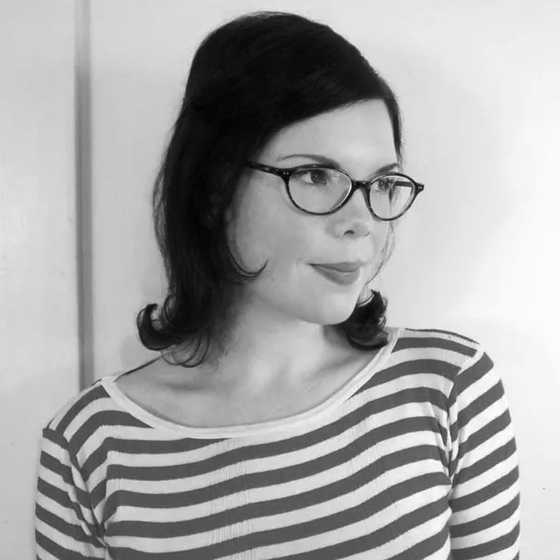
- Occupations: Children’s writer, illustrator

Emily Winfield Martin is an American artist and author-illustrator of children's books. She lives in Portland, Oregon.

After graduating from art school in 2005, Martin began selling her visual art through the online store Etsy, thereafter achieving acclaim in The New York Times, on CNN, and on The Martha Stewart Show as one of Etsy's original and most enduring success stories. Eventually Martin parlayed these successes into a career in professional book publication.

Martin has written and illustrated seven children's books: an enigmatic book of story fragments & illustrations called The Imaginaries, middle grade fairy tale retelling Snow & Rose, picture books The Wonderful Things You Will Be, Dream Animals: A Bedtime Journey, Day Dreamers: A Journey of Imagination, and The Littlest Family's Big Day. A series of vignettes, Oddfellow's Orphanage, which she also wrote and illustrated, was described by Publishers Weekly as a "poignant and gently humorous debut […] set in an unusual orphanage." She also produced a popular crafts book, The Black Apple's Paper Doll Primer: Activities and Amusements for the Curious Paper Artist.

== Bibliography ==
=== Children's fiction ===
- Oddfellow's Orphanage (2012)
- Snow & Rose (2017)

=== Instructional ===
- The Black Apple's Paper Doll Primer: Activities and Amusements for the Curious Paper Artist (2010)

=== Picture books ===
- Dream Animals: A Bedtime Journey (2013)
- Day Dreamers: A Journey of Imagination (2014)
- The Wonderful Things You Will Be (2015)
- The Littlest Family's Big Day (2016)
- The Imaginaries (2020)
- This is a Gift for You (2021)
- Wonderful Babies (2022)
- Wonderful Seasons (2023)
