= Extra Yarn =

2012 picture book

- Front cover, designed by Mac Barnett
- Author: Mac Barnett
- Illustrator: Jon Klassen
- Language: English
- Published: 2012
- Publisher: Balzer + Bray/HarperCollins
- Publication place: United States of America
- Awards: Caldecott Honor; Boston Globe–Horn Book Award
- ISBN: 978-0-06-195338-5

Extra Yarn is a 2012 picture book written by Mac Barnett and illustrated by Jon Klassen. The book tells the story of a girl named Annabelle who knits for everyone in her town with a supply of yarn, until an archduke wants the yarn for himself. The book was a recipient of the 2013 Caldecott Honor for its illustrations. It received a starred review from Publishers Weekly.

== Film ==
In 2014, Weston Woods adapted this book to an animated film, narrated by Nicola Barber, and directed by Soup2Nuts. The film won the ALA Notable Video award by the ALSC.
