= Judith Byron Schachner =

American writer

Judith Byron "Judy" Schachner (born August 20, 1951) is an American children's writer and illustrator. She is best known for the Skippyjon Jones series. Schachner lives in Swarthmore, Pennsylvania, with her husband, Bob, and a dog and her two Siamese cats.

== Early life ==
Growing up, Schachner had a difficult childhood. She was born and raised in Waltham, Massachusetts, by her parents Edward and Mary Francis Byron. She grew up the youngest and has two older brothers, Kevin and Ted. Her family was working class. Her mother was diagnosed with breast cancer when Judy was eight years old. Growing up, she struggled with anxiety and drawing was her way to cope with it. Judy was having difficulties in school, as well. All through her early schooling, Judy did not excel in mathematics and science. Her teachers would constantly comment on how shy Judy was. However, her teachers and classmates did notice she had a very good artistic eye. When she was little, she would draw quite a bit. She had a very lively imagination and spent most of her childhood dreaming of a better life for herself and her family. She attended the Massachusetts College of Art and graduated in 1973 with a BFA in illustration.

== Career ==
Judy was able to get a job working at Hallmark Cards and began designing all kinds of cards for them. This proved to be unsatisfactory work and she became discouraged. Eventually, Judy married her husband, Bob, and she became a mother to two daughters, Sarah Elizabeth and Emma Rose. She had more free time and was able to spend more time drawing things she liked and writing. She realized how much she liked motherhood and how much her daughters inspired her. The books she would read to her Sarah and Emma encouraged her to start working on her portfolio again. While working on her portfolio, she met Donna Jo Napoli. Donna wanted her to illustrate her children's book, “The Prince of the Pond”. Helping Donna with her illustration gave her a head start in the illustration and publication field. When she first went to meet an editor, they asked her if she was a writer and she lied and said yes. She had only been working on illustrations at this point. Eventually she met an editor named Lucia Monfried and was able to get some books in the working. She was able to get her first book, “Willy and May” published. Since then, she has had several other well-known books published. She has a studio on the second floor of her house. She surrounds herself with things that inspire her while she works. Some of the things in her studio include toys, textiles, and taxidermy. She loves to listen to music while working on her project, especially her daughter Sarah’s compositions. She draws a lot of her inspiration from her own life. A lot of her books have characters based on people in her life, such as her children. “Yo, Vikings!” is based on a true story about her daughters. She is best known for her book series, Skippyjon Jones. Skippyjon Jones is inspired by her own cat and her brothers, Ted and Kevin. The book series is about a siamese cat who is under the impression that he is a chihuahua. The book contains many instances of mock Spanish and has received some negative reviews because of it. Judy continues to write and illustrate today. She also makes visits to schools and libraries to give presentations on her work and inspired the less than stellar students.

== Her works ==
Skippyjon Jones, Skippyjon Jones in the Dog House', Skippyjon Jones in Mummy Trouble, Skippyjon Jones and the Big Bones, Skippyjon Jones Lost in Spice, Skippyjon Jones Class Action, Skippyjon Jones Aay Card-Ramba!, Skippyjon Jones Shape Up, Skippyjon Jones takes a Dive, Skippyjon Jones Up, Up and Away, Skippyjon Jones Up and Down, Skippyjon Jones and the Treasure Hunt, Skippyjon Jones Color Crazy, Douwe Bob, Yo, Vikings!, Bits & Pieces, The Grannyman, How the Cat Swallowed Thunder, I Know an Old Lady Who Swallowed a Pie, Willy and May, Mr. Emerson’s Cook, Oils And Soop

== Her illustrations ==
The Prince of the Pond Written by Donna Jo Napoli, Jimmy the Pickpocket of the Palace Written by Donna Jo Napoli, Gracie, the Pixie of the Puddle Written by Donna Jo Napoli, Staying with Grandmother Written by Barbara Baker, What Shall I Dream? Written by Laura McGee Kvasnosky

== Awards ==
Skippyjon Jones won the E. B. White Read Aloud Book Award and The State Children’s Choice Awards in the states of Indiana, Nebraska, Pennsylvania, and Washington.
