= Karen Foxlee =

Australian writer

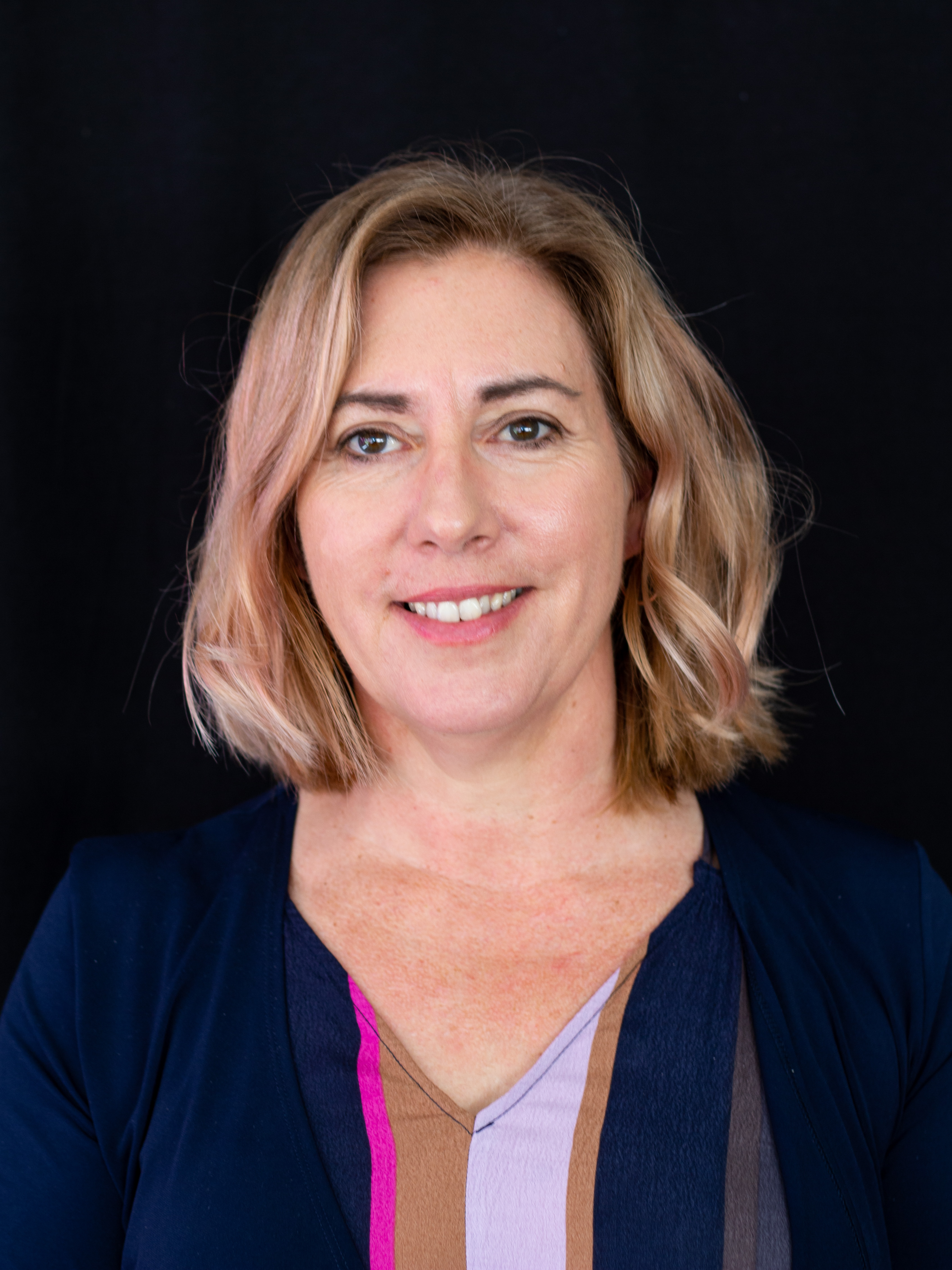
- Foxlee at Perth Festival Writers Week in 2019
- Born: 1971 (age 54–55); Mount Isa, Queensland, Australia
- Occupation: Novelist
- Notable work: Ophelia and the Marvelous Boy

Karen Foxlee is an Australian novelist.

== Life and career ==
Foxlee was born in 1971 and grew up in Mount Isa, Queensland.

After training and working as a nurse for most of her adult life, she graduated from the University of the Sunshine Coast with a Bachelor of Arts degree in 2005, in creative writing. Her first novel The Anatomy of Wings was originally published in 2008, by the University of Queensland Press, and has since been published in the United States, the United Kingdom and Canada.

== Awards and nominations ==
- 2006: Queensland Premier's Literary Award (Best emerging author)
- 2008: Commonwealth Writers' Prize (Best First Book in the South East Asia and South Pacific Region) for The Anatomy of Wings
- 2008: Dobbie Encouragement Award for The Anatomy of Wings
- 2014: Davitt Award for The Midnight Dress
- 2019: Griffith University Young Adult Book Award for Lenny’s Book of Everything
- 2020: New South Wales Premier's Literary Awards Ethel Turner Prize for Young People's Literature for Lenny's Book of Everything
- 2022: Indie Books Award Children's Book, shortlisted for Dragon Skin
- 2022: CBCA Children's Book of the Year Award: Younger Readers, shortlisted for Dragon Skin
- 2022: New South Wales Premier's Literary Awards Patricia Wrightson Prize for Children's Literature for Dragon Skin
- 2022: Prime Minister's Literary Award for Australian history, shortlisted for Dragon Skin
- 2026: Shortlisted for the Victorian Premier's Prize for Children's Literature for The Wondrous Tale of Lavender Wolfe
- 2026: Prime Minister's Literary Award for Children's Fiction, shortlisted for The Wondrous Tale of Lavender Wolfe

== Works ==
- The Anatomy of Wings (2008)
- The Midnight Dress (2013)
- Ophelia and the Marvelous Boy (2014)
- A Most Magical Girl (2016)
- Lenny's Book of Everything (2018)
- Horatio Squeak (illustrated by Evie Barrow, 2019)
- Dragon Skin (2021)
- The Wondrous Tale of Lavender Wolfe (2025)

=== Miss Mary-Kate Martin's Guide to Monsters series ===
- The Wrath of the Woolington Wyrm (2022)
- The Trouble with the Two-headed Hydra (2022)
- The Bother with the Bonkillyknock Beast (2024)
