= Peter Brown =

Peter Brown may refer to:

== Business ==
- Peter T. Brown, English executive director of the Free Software Foundation
- Peter M. Brown (born 1941), Canadian businessman
- Peter Fitzhugh Brown (born 1955), CEO of Renaissance Technologies

== Music ==
- Peter McCarrick Brown, former drummer from the American band Wheatus
- Pete Brown (jazz musician) (1906–1963), American jazz saxophonist
- Peter Brown (singer) (born 1953), American funk singer, 1970s
- Pete Brown (1940–2023), British rock singer, 1960s
- Peter Brown (music manager), personal assistant to The Beatles and Brian Epstein

== Politics ==
- Peter Brown (Newfoundland politician) (c. 1797–1845), one of Newfoundland's first elected member of House of Assembly
- Peter Brown (South African politician) (1924–2004), founding member of the South African Liberal Party
- Peter Brown (New Zealand politician) (born 1939), New Zealand First MP and former deputy party leader, 1996–2008
- Peter Nicholas Brown (1797–1846), or Peter Broun, first colonial secretary of Western Australia (1829–1846)
- Peter Hoyt Brown (1936–2017), council member, city of Houston
- Peter Campbell Brown (1913–1994), corporation counsel for New York City and Justice Department official

== Sports ==
- Pete Brown (golfer) (1935–2015), PGA Tour golfer
- Peter Brown (ice hockey) (born 1954), American ice hockey defenceman
- Pete Brown (American football) (1930–2001), American football player
- Peter Brown (rugby league) (born 1961), New Zealand rugby league footballer
- Peter Brown (rugby union) (1941–2025), Scottish rugby union footballer
- Peter Brown (footballer, born 1934) (1934–2011), with Southampton and Wrexham
- Peter Brown (footballer, born 1961), English former footballer
- Peter Brown (field hockey) (born 1994), field hockey player from Northern Ireland

=== Australian rules footballers ===
- Peter Brown (Australian footballer, born 1906) (1906–1988), North Melbourne player
- Peter Brown (Australian footballer, born 1949), Geelong player
- Peter Brown (Australian footballer, born 1952), South Melbourne player
- Peter Brown (Australian footballer, born 1957), Fitzroy player
- Peter Brown (Australian footballer, born 1958), Carlton and St Kilda player
- Peter Brown (Australian footballer, born 1963), St Kilda player

== Literature, arts and entertainment ==
- Peter Brown (naturalist) (died 1799), British painter and natural history illustrator
- Peter Brown (British artist) (born 1967), British painter
- Peter Brown (illustrator) (born 1979), American illustrator of children's books
- Peter Brown (New Zealand artist) (1921–2005), New Zealand painter
- Peter Brown (actor) (1935–2016), American television actor
- Pete Brown (writer) (born 1968), UK writer on drink and drinking culture
- Peter Brown (Oz), child protagonist of the Oz books by Ruth Plumly Thompson
- Peter Currell Brown (born 1936), British novelist

== Other ==
- Peter Browne (Mayflower passenger) (1594–1633), also spelled Brown, Pilgrim and English colonist, signer of the Mayflower Compact
- Peter Brown (British Army officer) (1775–1853), British Army officer interested in the welfare of soldiers' children
- Peter Brown (VC) (1837–1894), Swedish recipient of the Victoria Cross
- Peter Hume Brown (1849–1918), Scottish biographer and historian
- Peter Brown (historian) (born 1935), Irish historian and biographer specializing in Late Antiquity and the cult of Saints
- Peter Douglas Brown (born 1925), historian of eighteenth-century British politics
- Peter Brown (bishop) (born 1947), New Zealand-born Catholic bishop in American Samoa
- Peter J. Brown (born 1963), U.S. Coast Guard rear admiral and Homeland Security Adviser
- Peter J. Brown, computer scientist, developer of the Guide hypertext system and ML/I macro system

== See also ==
- Peter Browne (disambiguation)
