= The Wild Robot (disambiguation) =

The Wild Robot is a 2024 American animated science fiction film directed by Chris Sanders.

The Wild Robot can also refer to:

- The Wild Robot (book series), a trilogy of novels including The Wild Robot (2016), The Wild Robot Escapes (2018) and The Wild Robot Protects (2023)
- The Wild Robot (soundtrack), the original soundtrack of The Wild Robot film
