= Creepy Pair of Underwear! =

2017 children's book by Aaron Reynolds

Creepy Pair of Underwear! is a 2017 children's picture book written by Aaron Reynolds and illustrated by Peter Brown. It is a part of the Jasper Rabbit's Creepy Tales series of books, which also include Creepy Carrots! and Creepy Crayon!.

The main character, Jasper Rabbit, is interested in a new pair of underwear with Frankenstein patterns but finds it unnerves him and tries to get rid of it.

The book uses pencil work and digital coloring, and uses black and white imagery. Kirkus Reviews stated that the work emphasizes the main character's facial expressions by having background and drawing details sparse. Elissa Gerschowitz, the editor of The Horn Book, described the artwork as "noirish".

== Reception ==
It was on The New York Times Best Seller list.

It was a finalist for the Cybils Award.

Gerschowitz stated that the drawings "heighten both the silliness and the spookiness".

John Peters of Booklist gave the book a starred review and stated that it has "the ideal balance between frightening and hilarious".

Maria B. Salvadore, who had previously worked for the District of Columbia Public Library, wrote that the storyline is "equally humorous and appropriately but safely spooky."

Deborah Stevenson of the Bulletin of the Center for Children's Books stated that the work is "balancing nicely between humorous and haunting".

Publishers Weekly gave the book a starred review, stating that "Brown’s noir-style b&w illustrations make the most of the premise".
