= John Osborne (disambiguation) =

John Osborne (1929–1994) was an English playwright.

John Osborne may also refer to:

== Law and politics ==
- John Osborne (barrister) (1630s–1692), English barrister and judge
- Sir John Osborne, 7th Baronet (1688–1743), Irish baronet, landowner and politician
- John Proby Osborne (1755–1787), Irish politician
- John Eugene Osborne (1858–1943), American politician
- John Osborne (Australian politician) (1878–1961), New South Wales politician
- John Osborne (Montserrat politician) (1936–2011), Montserratian politician
- John P. Osborne, Montserratian politician

== Others ==
- John Osborne (principal) (1690–1748), Scottish minister
- John Walter Osborne (1828–1902), Irish-born Australian chemist and engineer
- John Osborne Jr. (1833–1922), British jockey
- John Osborne (journalist) (1842–1908), Australian journalist and Methodist minister
- John Osborne (Medal of Honor) (1844–1920), American naval sailor
- John Osborne, 11th Duke of Leeds (1901–1963), British peer
- John F. Osborne (1907–1981), American journalist and author
- John Michael "Ozzy" Osbourne, British singer and songwriter, pioneer of heavy metal
- John W. Osborne (1927–2019), American historian
- John Osborne (footballer) (1940–1998), English football goalkeeper
- John Osborne (writer) (born 1981), English writer and poet
- John Osborne (broadcaster), British radio broadcaster

== Other uses ==
- John A. Osborne Airport, Montserratian airport

== See also ==
- John Osborn (disambiguation)
