= John Osborn =

John Osborn may refer to:

- John Osborn (politician) (1922–2015), British MP 1959–1987
- John Osborn (sailor) (born 1945), British sailor, Olympic champion and world champion
- John Osborn (tenor) (born 1972), American tenor
- Sir John Osborn, 5th Baronet (1772–1848), British Member of Parliament
- John A. Osborn (1939–2000), British chemist
- John E. Osborn (mathematician) (1936–2011), American mathematician
- John E. Osborn (lawyer) (born 1957), American lawyer, health care industry executive and diplomat
- John Jay Osborn (1917–2014), American physician
- John Jay Osborn Jr. (born 1945), American author
- John Robert Osborn (1899–1941), Canadian World War II Victoria Cross recipient

== See also ==
- John Osborne (disambiguation)
- John Osbourne, real name of singer Ozzy Osbourne
