= Karl Schweizer =

Historian of Europe

Karl Schweizer FRSA FRHistS
- Born: Germany
- Awards: Adèle Mellen Prize (1989)

Academic background
- Education: Wilfrid Laurier University(BA); University of Waterloo (MA); University of Cambridge (PhD)
- Thesis: Frederick the Great, William Pitt and Lord Bute: The Origin, Development and Dissolution of the Anglo-Prussian Alliance, 1756–63 (1976)
- Academic advisor: Herbert Butterfield

Academic work
- Discipline: History
- Sub-discipline: 18th-century European history
- Institutions: New Jersey Institute of Technology; Rutgers University

Karl Wolfgang Schweizer FRSA FRHistS is a historian specialising in eighteenth century European history.

== Education and academic career ==
Schweizer was born in Germany and was educated at Wilfrid Laurier University in Waterloo, Ontario, Canada, where he graduated with a BA in 1969, and in 1970 he earned his MA at the University of Waterloo. In 1976, he was awarded a PhD from the University of Cambridge, where he studied with Herbert Butterfield. His doctoral dissertation was titled "Frederick the Great, William Pitt and Lord Bute: The Origin, Development and Dissolution of the Anglo-Prussian Alliance, 1756–63".

In 1988, Schweizer was appointed chairman of the Humanities Department at the New Jersey Institute of Technology (NJIT), a post he held until 1993 and again during 2001–2003. Since 2000, he has been professor of history at the NJIT/Rutgers Federated History Department. In 1994, he was appointed a member of the Graduate School, Rutgers University.

Jeremy Black has said that among those interested in eighteenth century European international relations, Schweizer "has a deservedly high reputation for a number of judicious and important monographs' In 2020, Schweizer was awarded the 2020 CSLA Lifetime Achievement Award from the College of Science and Liberal Arts, New Jersey Institute of Technology. He is a Fellow of the Royal Historical Society, the Royal Society of Arts and the New York Academy of Sciences. He has also been awarded the Congressional Order of Merit, USA, is a member of the Republican congressional committee and has held fellowships/visiting appointments at Princeton, Cambridge, Yale and the London School of Economics. Moreover, Dr. Schweizer is a Senior Fellow of the Foreign Policy Research Institute, Philadelphia, PA. He has won numerous literary awards for his work, including the Adèle Mellen Prize (1989 and 2016)and the NEW Jersey"s Writer Conference AWARD(1994).

== Works ==
=== Books ===
- The Devonshire Diary: William Cavendish Fourth Duke of Devonshire, Memoranda on State of Affairs 1759–1762, edited with Peter Douglas Brown (London: Royal Historical Society, 1982).On Line publication:Cambridge University Press, 2009.
- The Art of Diplomacy (Leicester University Press, 1983; distributed by Columbia University Press; paperback edition, UPA, 1993).
- Lord Bute: Essays in Re-Interpretation, editor (Leicester: Leicester University Press, 1988).
- England, Prussia, and the Seven Years' War (Lewiston, New York: Edwin Mellen Press, 1989). Awarded the Adèle Mellen Prize(1989).
- Cobbett in his Times, with John W. Osborne (Leicester: Leicester University Press, 1990).New Jersey Writers Conference Author Award,1994
- Frederick the Great, William Pitt, and Lord Bute, The Anglo-Prussian Alliance, 1756-1763 outstanding studies and dissertations(New York: Garland Publishing, 1991).Republished by Cambridge UniversityPress,2014.
- William Pitt, Earl of Chatham 1708–1778. A Bibliography (Westport: Greenwood Press, 1993).Choice Outstanding Academic Title,1993.
- Francois de Callieres: Diplomat and Man of Letters (Lewiston, New York: Edwin Mellen Press, 1995).
- Seeds Of Evil: The Gray-Snyder Murder Case (AuthorHouse, 2001).
- War, Politics and Diplomacy (Oxford, 2003).
- Statesmen, Diplomats and the Press: Essays on 18th Century Britain (Lewiston, New York: Edwin Mellen Press, 2003).
- Herbert Butterfield: Essays on the History of Science (Lewiston, New York: Edwin Mellen Press, 2005).
- Parliament and the Press 1688–1936, editor (Edinburgh: Edinburgh University Press, 2006).Literary Award, and silver medal, International Biographical Association, Cambridge:2007
- The International Thought of Herbert Butterfield, edited with Paul Sharp (London: Palgrave Macmillan, 2007).
- The Seven Years War: A Transatlantic History, with M. Schumann (London: Routledge, 2008).
- Oligarchy, Dissent and the Culture of Print in Georgian Britain: Essays, Reviews, and Documents (Lewiston, New York: Edwin Mellen Press, 2015). Awarded the Adèle Mellen Prize (2016).
- Ed., Diplomatic Thought,1648–1815 (Special Issue of Studies in History and Politics/Etudes D'Histoire et Politique; (Sherbrooke,1982).
- Ed. with introduction, Warfare and Tactics in the Eighteenth Century: Some Recent Research (Kingston, 1984).
- Ed. with Jeremy Black, Essays in Honour of Ragnhild Hatton (Humanities Press International, 1985).
- Ed. with Jeremy Black, Politics and the Press in Hanoverian Britain (Humanities Press International, 1989).
- Ed. with introduction, In Defence of Australia"s Constitutional Monarchy, Lewiston, New York: Edwin Mellen Press, 2003).
- Co-author, The Origins of War in Early Modern Europe (Edinburgh: John Donald Publishers, 1987)
- Co-author, The Oxford Handbook of History and International Relations (Oxford: Oxford University Press, 2022)
- Contributor, Modern Encyclopedia of Russia and the Soviet Union (Boston, 1978, 1979, 1980)
- Contributor, The Oxford Dictionary of National Biography (Oxford: Oxford University Press, 2003)
- Contributor, Encyclopedia of War, ed. Gordon Martell (Wiley-Blackwell, 2012)
- Contributor,"British Literary Magazines"ed.A.Sullivan(Greenwood Press,1983)

Editor, Studies in History and politics/Etudes d"Histoire et politiques(1980-1989)

=== Articles ===
- 'Lord Bute, Newcastle, Prussia, and the Hague Overtures: A Re-Examination', Albion: A Quarterly Journal Concerned with British Studies, Vol. 9, No. 1 (Spring, 1977), pp. 72–97.
- 'William Pitt, Lord Bute, and the Peace Negotiations with France, May–September 1761', Albion: A Quarterly Journal Concerned with British Studies, Vol. 13, No. 3 (Autumn, 1981), pp. 262–275.
- (with Carol S. Leonard), 'Britain, Prussia, Russia and the Galitzin Letter: A Reassessment', The Historical Journal, Vol. 26, No. 3 (Sep., 1983), pp. 531–556.
- 'Edward Weston (1703–70): The Papers of an Eighteenth-Century Under-Secretary in the Lewis Walpole Library', The Yale University Library Gazette, Vol. 71, No. 1/2 (October 1996), pp. 43–48.
- 'Jacobite Material among the Scottish Loudoun Papers', Huntington Library Quarterly, Vol. 61, No. 1 (1998), pp. 101–105.

As well as over 300articles/reviews in scholarly journals and reference works.
