= Creepy Carrots! =

2012 children's book by Aaron Reynolds

- Front cover, designed by Peter Brown
- Author: Aaron Reynolds
- Illustrator: Peter Brown
- Language: English
- Publisher: Simon & Schuster Books for Young Readers
- Publication date: Aug. 21 2012
- Pages: 40
- ISBN: 1442402970
- OCLC: 858737867
- LC Class: PZ7.R33213 Cre 2012
- Preceded by: TBA
- Followed by: Creepy Pair of Underwear

Creepy Carrots! is a 40-page children's book written by Aaron Reynolds and illustrated by Peter Brown. It was published on August 21, 2012, by Simon & Schuster Books for Young Readers. In 2013, a 10-minute animated film based on the book was made by Weston Woods Studios and narrated by James Naughton.

This book was followed by two more books, Creepy Pair of Underwear! and Creepy Crayon!.

== Plot ==
Jasper Rabbit loves carrots, especially the carrots that grow in Crackenhopper Field. They are "fat, crisp and free for the taking". Jasper enjoys these carrots "on the way to school, on his way to Little League practice and on his way home at night", until he starts to imagine that they are following him. He first notices something strange after his Little League game when he stops at Crackenhopper Field. He thinks he sees three jack-o-lantern-jawed carrots behind him in the bathroom mirror. When he turns around, it is just a washcloth, shampoo bottle, and a rubber duck. Then while he is brushing his teeth, he sees the creepy carrots. Jasper yells for his parents when a carrot shadow lurks up on his bathroom walls. "By the end of the week Jasper was seeing creepy carrots creeping EVERYWHERE." Jasper then comes up with a plan to make sure the carrots couldn't escape. He builds a fence and a moat around Crackenhopper Field. Jasper is very pleased with himself: "No creepy carrots would get out of that patch again." As the sun sets, the carrots "cheered". Their plan had worked. Jasper Rabbit would never get into that carrot patch ever again.

== Writer ==
Aaron Reynolds was born on June 4, 1970, and moved often as he grew up. He has lived in Texas, Colorado, Florida, Okinawa and New Jersey. As of 2013 he resides in Chicago, Illinois with his wife and two children. Reynolds has a degree in theatre from Illinois Wesleyan University.

== Illustrator ==
Peter Brown was born in 1979, raised in New Jersey, and trained at the Art Center College of Design in Pasadena, California. His first published book was Flight of the Dodo, which he both wrote and illustrated. It was published in 2005 by Little, Brown, who brought out his second and third books featuring Chowder, an oversize, slobbery pet dog who "never managed to fit in with other neighborhood dogs".

== Characters ==
- Jasper Rabbit
- Jasper Rabbit's Mom
- Jasper Rabbit's Dad
- The Creepy Carrots

== Reviews ==
Professor Deborah Stevenson, in her review of the book, notes the contrast demonstrated throughout the story: "The book balances menace and absurdity in this strange tale of vegetable stalking, playing up the contrast between the genuinely spooky elements and the unassuming threat." She also goes into detail about the images in the book. "Glossy black borders and smudgy pencil outlines lightened only by paler gray and set off by the orange of the carrots to provide a smoky Halloween flavor to Brown's nocturnal art, and the scenes are dense with creepy silhouettes and foreboding shadows. Brown meticulously controls his compositions and balances his spreads, often paralleling or mirroring verso and recto or tidily subdividing pages into panels."

In his own review, literary agent Paul Rodeen states: "Reynolds makes liberal use of ellipses for suspense, conjuring the "soft ... sinister ... tunktunktunk of carrots creeping". Brown illustrates in noirish grayscale with squash-orange highlights and dramatic lighting, framing each panel in shiny black for a claustrophobic film-still effect that cements the story's horror movie feel."

== Awards ==
- Randolph Caldecott Medal – 2013 Honor
- Young Hoosier Book Award (Picture Book) – 2015
- ALA Notable Video, 2014
- Odyssey Award
