= Peter Browne =

Peter Browne is the name of:

- Peter Browne (Mayflower passenger) (1594–1633), pilgrim and English colonist who arrived in North America on the Mayflower
- Peter Browne (theologian) (1665–1735), Irish theologian and bishop
- Peter Browne (Australian politician) (1924–2000), member of the Australian House of Representatives
- Peter Browne (rugby union) (born 1987), London Welsh second row
- Peter Browne (MP) (1794–1872), MP for Rye 1818–26
- Peter Browne (1670–1724), landowner and father of the First Earl of Altamont
- Peter Browne, 2nd Earl of Altamont (1730s–1780), Irish landowner and MP
- Peter Browne (athlete) (born 1949), English middle-distance runner
- Peter Browne (priest) (died 1842), Dean of Ferns; illegitimate son of the 2nd Earl of Altamont
- Peter Browne (Australian actor), Australian actor

== See also ==
- Peter Brown (disambiguation)
- Peter Bowne (1575–1624?), English physician
