= Peter Brown (Australian footballer, born 1952) =

Australian rules footballer, born 1952

Personal information
- Full name: Peter Brown
- Born: 9 August 1952 (age 74)
- Original teams: Altona North, St Paul's

Playing career^{1}
Years	Club	Games (Goals)
1971–76	South Melbourne	77 (9)
- ^{1} Playing statistics correct to the end of 1971-76.

Peter Brown (born 9 August 1952) is a former Australian rules footballer who played for South Melbourne in the Victorian Football League (VFL) between 1971 and 1976.
