= The Wild Robot (book series) =

Book series by Peter Brown

- The Wild Robot (2016); The Wild Robot Escapes (2018); The Wild Robot Protects (2023); The Wild Robot on the Island (2025)
- Author: Peter Brown
- Illustrator: Peter Brown
- Language: English
- Publisher: Little, Brown Books for Young Readers
- No. of books: 3

The Wild Robot is a series of children's science fiction novels by American writer and illustrator Peter Brown, which consists of The Wild Robot (2016), The Wild Robot Escapes (2018), and The Wild Robot Protects (2023). The books are published by Little, Brown Books for Young Readers. The novels have been well received by critics.

The first book in the series was adapted into a 2024 animated film The Wild Robot, with a sequel, adapting the second book, in development. It was adapted into a children's illustrated book, The Wild Robot on the Island (2025).

== The Wild Robot (2016) ==
The Wild Robot
- First edition cover
- Publication date: April 5, 2016
- ISBN: 978-0-316-38199-4

The Wild Robot was published on April 5, 2016. In the novel, a mysterious box appears on an island following a hurricane. Otters open the box to discover a robot: ROZZUM unit 7134 (cf. the play R.U.R.), later nicknamed Roz. After coming to life, Roz must learn how to use her skills and technical abilities to adapt to the wild, learning from the animals around her. Although the animals are initially frightened by her, they come to trust her after she adopts an orphaned gosling, Brightbill. All goes well until a ship arrives one day harboring 3 gun-bearing RECO robots.

=== Themes ===
The Wild Robot explores themes related to otherness. In addition, the role of nature and nurture in personality development is examined, as Roz "hatches" and reacts to the environment around her.

=== Reception ===
The Wild Robot was a New York Times Bestseller, is a Junior Library Guild book, and received starred reviews from Booklist, Kirkus Reviews, Publishers Weekly, and School Library Journal.

Booklist's Julia Smith discussed how "Brown doesn't gloss over the harsher aspects of life in the wild [...] but a logic-driven robot provides the perfect way to objectively observe nature's order". Publishers Weekly similarly added, "The allegory of otherness is clear but never heavy-handed, and Roz has just enough human attributes to make her sympathetic while retaining her robot characteristics". Kirkus Reviews referred to the novel as "thought-provoking and charming". Smith compared The Wild Robot to Disney's WALL-E, while Kirkus Reviews compared it to Randall Jarrell's The Animal Family.

Booklist proffered a starred review for the audiobook narrated by Kate Atwater. Reviewer Amanda Blau highlighted how "music and sound effects underscore the early action", though it disappears once Roz is booted up, as well as how "Atwater gives each animal a voice representing its nature".

In 2016, Booklist, Kirkus Reviews, the New York Public Library, Publishers Weekly, and Shelf Awareness, and The Washington Post named The Wild Robot one of the year's best children's books; Booklist named the audiobook one of the best audiobooks for children. The following year, the Association for Library Service to Children included it on their list of Notable Children's Books, and Booklist included the audiobook on their "Top 10 Middle-Grade Fiction on Audio" list. In 2019, Booklist included it on their list of the "50 Best Middle-Grade Novels of the 21st Century".

=== Film adaptation ===
DreamWorks adapted The Wild Robot into an animated film, which was released on September 27, 2024, and received acclaim from critics and was nominated for three Academy Awards. According to Kirkus Reviews, the film is "faithful to Brown's story in its broad strokes, is impressive in some ways but not without its malfunctions".

=== The Wild Robot on the Island (2025) ===
The Wild Robot on the Island
- Publication date: June 24, 2025
- ISBN: 978-1835871645

The Wild Robot on the Island is a picture book adaption of the novel, written and illustrated by Peter Brown.

== The Wild Robot Escapes (2018) ==
The Wild Robot Escapes
- First edition cover
- Publication date: March 13, 2018
- ISBN: 978-0-316-47926-4

The Wild Robot Escapes was published on March 13, 2018. The novel starts with Roz coming to life at Hilltop Farm, a dairy farm run by the Shareef family, which she is expected to help run. Although she attempts to act like the robot she was designed to be, she misses life on her island. As she speaks with the animals, word of her situation and location get to Brightbill, who comes to save her, with the help of the farmer's children. After escaping, Roz and Brightbill find more dangers and barriers to returning home.

=== Themes ===
The Wild Robot Escapes explores themes related to "the division between humans and machines", what it means to be considered 'different', and "the nature of love and selfhood".

=== Reception ===
The Wild Robot Escapes is a Junior Library Guild book and received starred reviews from Booklist and School Library Journal.

Reviewers often referred to The Wild Robot Escapes as "thought-provoking". According to Booklist's Julia Smith, "warmth and gentleness course through the novel, even as dangers emerge". Smith also discussed how "the narrator acts as an honest and reassuring friend who periodically breaks from storytelling to explain difficult truths to young readers". While Kirkus Reviews noted that the novel is "not as effervescent as Roz's first outing", they found "it is still a provocatively contemplative one".

In 2018, Booklist included The Wild Robot Escapes on their "Top 10 Incredible Journeys in Middle-Grade Novels" list. The following year, the Association for Library Service to Children included the audiobook on their list of Notable Children's Recordings, and it was named on The Eleanor Cameron Notable Middle Grade Books List.

The Wild Robot was nominated for the Goodreads Choice Award for Middle Grade & Children's (2016) and was a Charlotte Huck Award honor book (2017).

=== Film adaptation ===
DreamWorks will adapt The Wild Robot Escapes into an animated film, which will serve as a sequel to the 2024 film.

== The Wild Robot Protects (2023) ==
The Wild Robot Protects
- First edition cover
- Publication date: September 26, 2023
- ISBN: 978-0-316-66941-2

The Wild Robot Protects (ISBN 978-0-316-66941-2) was published on September 26, 2023. In the novel, Roz learns about a "Poison Tide", which kills the plants and fish it touches. To help protect the island, Roz and the animals move "their sea-dwelling friends" to an inland pond. However, drama increases as everyone deals with limited living spaces and dwindling resources. By accident, Roz learns she is waterproof and protected from the Poison Tide. With this new information, she swims out to address the root cause of the problem.

=== Reception ===
The Wild Robot Protects is a Junior Library Guild book and received starred reviews from Booklist and Kirkus Reviews.

Julia Smith, writing for Booklist, highlighted how "Brown smoothly incorporates real-world themes of climate change and human-caused pollution without turning the book into a 'problem novel'". Kirkus Reviews discussed similar points, ultimately calling the novel "hugely entertaining, timely, and triumphant".

Smith also called the illustrations "superb".

In 2023, Booklist included The Wild Robot Protects on their "Booklist Editors' Choice: Books for Youth" list.
