= John Jay Osborn =

American physician (1917–2014)

John Jay Osborn (1917–2014) was an American physician who made contributions to the early use of cardiopulmonary bypass (CPB) during heart surgery and to the postoperative care of such patients. He was a faculty member at the Stanford University School of Medicine.

== Early life ==
Born in Detroit and raised in Manhattan, Osborn was the son of Major General Frederick Osborn, a military officer who helped to develop the G.I. Bill. He was a descendant of John Jay and Cornelius Vanderbilt. He earned a biology degree from Princeton University and then graduated from the Johns Hopkins School of Medicine.

Osborn entered the U.S. Army as a medical officer during World War II. Before he left for the army, he had submitted a paper for publication based on a study he had conducted with dogs, showing that the dogs could survive deep hypothermia. Osborn received a letter from eminent cardiac surgeon Alfred Blalock asking for some revisions on his paper, but by this time Osborn was lying in a tent in the Philippines during a downpour, so he could not complete work on the paper. After two years with the U.S. Army, he completed a residency at New York University School of Medicine, where he developed an interest in understanding blood oxygenation.

== Career ==
In 1954, Osborn moved westward to work at Stanford University Medical School; one source described him as "[s]eeking refuge from the blueblood New York aristocracy into which he was born." In California, Osborn collaborated with cardiac surgeon Frank Gerbode on the development of a heart-lung bypass machine that would allow open-heart surgery. Gerbode and Osborn's first open-heart surgery using CPB (a repair of a ventricular septal defect) was completed in 1956.

In 1958, when physicians were still skeptical of open-heart surgery and CPB, Osborn and Gerbode arranged to have a heart surgery televised before a Bay Area audience of 1.2 million people. The patient, an eight-year-old boy known only as Tommy, had been born with a hole in his heart.

Osborn became a specialist in intensive care medicine, and he became interested in the postoperative care of cardiac surgery patients. He was a member of the Society of Critical Care Medicine when the group was founded.

The Osborn wave, a unique finding on the EKG tracings of hypothermic patients, is named for him.

== Personal life ==
In 1944, Osborn married his first wife, Anne, who died in 2004. The couple enjoyed sailing a 36-foot brigantine out of the San Francisco Yacht Club. They were the parents of seven children, including John Jay Osborn Jr., an author and lawyer. After Anne's death, Osborn married his second wife, Sheret.

Osborn died in 2014 after he fell and broke his hip.
