= Peter Brown (Australian footballer, born 1949) =

Australian rules footballer

Personal information
- Full name: Peter Brown
- Born: 15 June 1949 (age 77)
- Original team: Epping

Playing career^{1}
Years	Club	Games (Goals)
1971	Geelong	6 (3)
- ^{1} Playing statistics correct to the end of 1971.

Peter Brown (born 15 June 1949) is a former Australian rules footballer who played for Geelong in the Victorian Football League (VFL) in 1971.
