= Peter Brown (Australian footballer, born 1963) =

Australian rules footballer

Personal information
- Full name: Peter Brown
- Born: 15 November 1963 (age 62)
- Original teams: Boronia, (EDFL)

Playing career^{1}
Years	Club	Games (Goals)
1985–86	St Kilda	5 (2)
- ^{1} Playing statistics correct to the end of 1985–86.

Peter Brown (born 15 November 1963) is a former Australian rules footballer who played for St Kilda in the Victorian Football League (VFL) in 1985–86. He was recruited from the Boronia Football Club in the Eastern District Football League (EDFL).
