= Peter Douglas Brown =

British historian

Peter Douglas Brown (born 7 June 1925) is a British writer and historian of 18th century British politics.

Brown was born in London on 7 June 1925. He was educated at Harrow School and Balliol College, Oxford. After his studies, Brown took on unpaid social work in London and Africa. During this period he was sent to prison for 12 months and fined £20 for "attempting to procure a male person for an immoral purpose". He is a Fellow of the Royal Historical Society. On 24 March 1982, he chaired a meeting to celebrate the 150th anniversary of the Great Reform Act at the Reform Club.

== Works ==
- The Chathamites: A Study in the Relationship between Personalities and Ideas in the Second Half of the Eighteenth Century (London: Macmillan, 1967). ISBN 9787270010816
- William Pitt, Earl of Chatham: The Great Commoner (London: Allen & Unwin, 1978). ISBN 004942145X
- (editor, with Karl W. Schweizer), The Devonshire Diary. William Cavendish, Fourth Duke of Devonshire. Memoranda on State Affairs, 1759–1762 (London: The Royal Historical Society, 1982). ISBN 0861930975
