= John W. Osborne =

American historian (1927–2019)

John Walter Osborne (1927 – January 2, 2019) was an American historian.

He was born in Brooklyn and educated at Rutgers University, where he was awarded a BA, an MA and a PhD.

Osborne was professor of history at Rutgers, where he taught British and European history. In 1988 he was awarded the Henry Browne Award for his teaching. After his retirement in 1993 he became professor emeritus.

== Works ==
- William Cobbett: His Thought and His Times (Rutgers University Press, 1966).
- The Silent Revolution: The Industrial Revolution in England as a Source of Cultural Change (Scribner, 1970). ISBN 068412470X
- John Cartwright (Cambridge University Press, 1972). ISBN 0521085373
- (with Karl W. Schweizer), Cobbett in His Times (Leicester University Press, 1990). ISBN 0718513401
