= Peter Brown (illustrator) =

American writer and illustrator

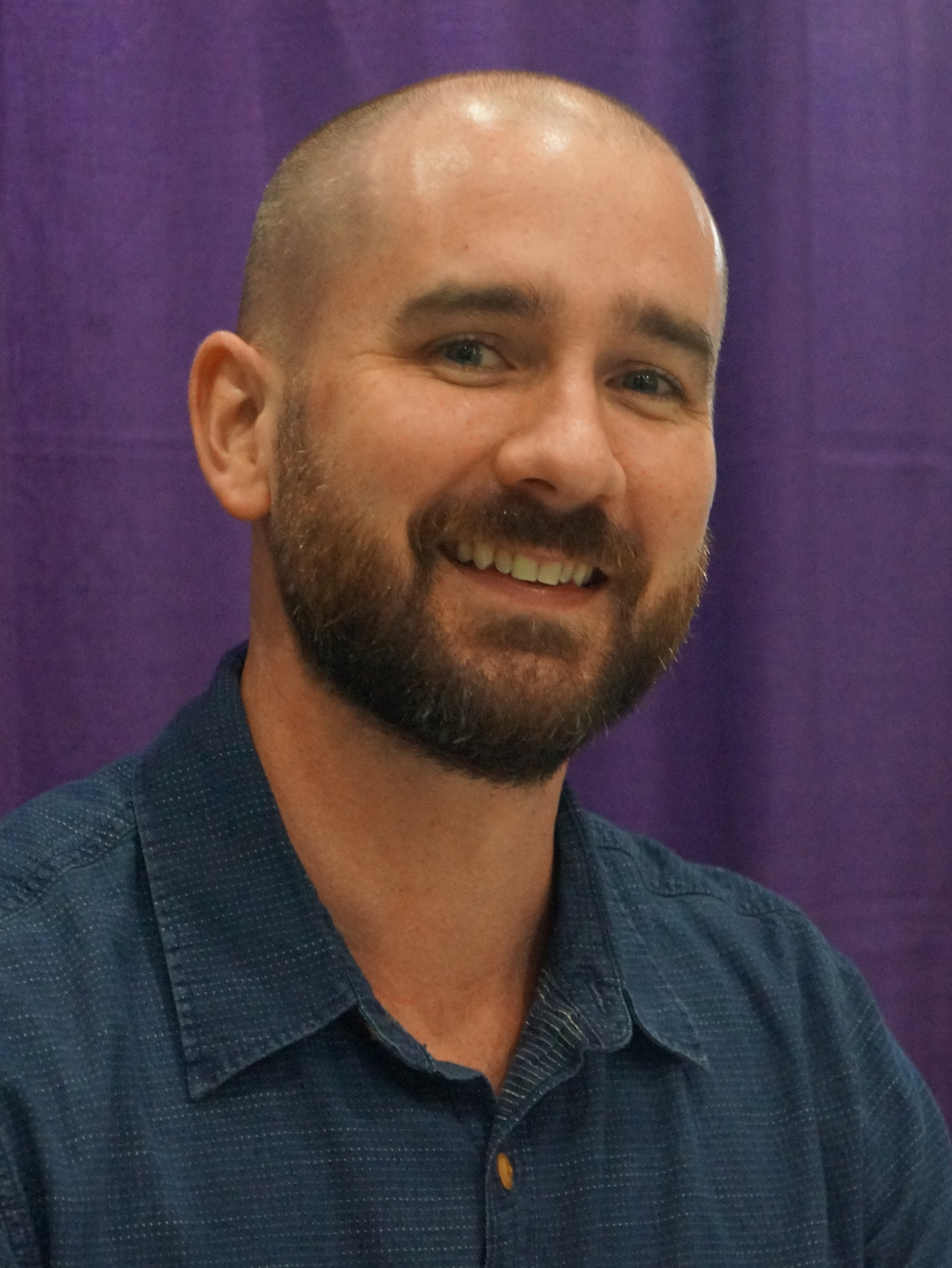
- Brown at the 2014 National Book Festival
- Born: Peter Nathan Brown; February 24, 1979 (age 47); Hopewell, New Jersey, U.S.
- Education: Art Center College of Design
- Occupations: Writer; Illustrator
- Writing career
- Genre: Children's picture books
- Notable works: The Curious Garden (2009); Children Make Terrible Pets (2010); Creepy Carrots! (2012); The Wild Robot (2016)
- Notable awards: Children's Book Council, 2010; Carnegie Medal, 2010, 2012; Caldecott Medal, 2013
- Website: www.peterbrownstudio.com

Peter Brown (born February 24, 1979) is a New York based American writer and illustrator, known for children's picture books. In 2013, Brown was awarded the Caldecott Medal for his illustration of Creepy Carrots!.

== Early life and education ==
Peter Nathan Brown was born on February 24, 1979 in Hopewell, New Jersey to Kate McGinnity, a teacher, and an astrophysicist father. Brown was educated at Hopewell Valley Central High School, and attended animation classes at Mercer County Community College whilst still in high school.

From 1997–2001, Brown studied at the ArtCenter College of Design.

== Career ==
In 2002, Brown moved to New York City in order to be closer to the publishing industry. He was working on animated TV shows when he signed a book deal to write and illustrate his first picture book, Flight of the Dodo.

Brown quickly wrote his second and third books, and his career as an author and illustrator of children’s books was under way. Since then Brown has written and illustrated many books for children and earned numerous honors, including a Caldecott Honor, a Horn Book Award, two E.B. White Awards, two E.B. White Honors, a Children’s Choice Award for Illustrator of the Year, two Irma Black Honors, a Golden Kite Award, a New York Times Best Illustrated Book Award and multiple New York Times bestsellers that include the novels The Wild Robot, The Wild Robot Escapes, and The Wild Robot Protects. An animated film based on The Wild Robot was released in 2024.

== Awards and honors ==
=== As writer and illustrator ===
Four of Brown's books are Junior Library Guild books: You Will Be My Friend! (2011), My Teacher Is a Monster! (2014), The Wild Robot (2016), and The Wild Robot Escapes (2018),

Six of Brown's books have landed on the New York Times bestseller list: Children Make Terrible Pets, The Curious Garden, The Wild Robot, Mr. Tiger Goes Wild, You Will Be My Friend!, and The Wild Robot Escapes. The Wild Robot, Mr. Tiger Goes Wild, and My Teacher is a Monster! are also IndieBound bestsellers. The Wild Robot Escapes is also a Wall Street Journal and USA Today bestseller.

In 2009, The Curious Garden was named one of the best children's books of the year by Publishers Weekly.

In 2010, The New York Times named Children Make Terrible Pets one of the best illustrated children's books of the year.

In 2014, My Teacher is a Monster! was named one of the best children's books of the year by Publishers Weekly.

In 2016, The Wild Robot was named one of the best children's books of the year by Kirkus Reviews, the New York Public Library, Publishers Weekly, and Shelf Awareness.

In 2019, The Wild Robot Escapes was named one of the best children's books of the year by Amazon, Entertainment Weekly, the New York Public Library, and School Library Journal.

The same year, Booklist included The Wild Robot on their "50 Best Middle-Grade Novels of the 21st Century" list.

Awards for books Brown wrote and illustrated
Year	Title	Award	Result	Ref.
2009	The Curious Garden	Cybils Award for Fiction Picture Book	Finalist	
2009	The Curious Garden	NAIBA Books of the Year for Picture Book	Winner	
2010	The Curious Garden	ALSC Notable Children's Books	Selection	
2010	The Curious Garden	Children's Choice Book Award: Illustrator of the Year	Winner	
2010	The Curious Garden	E. B. White Read Aloud Award for Picture Book	Winner	
2011	The Curious Garden	Carnegie Medal for Excellence in Children's Video	Winner	
2011	Children Make Terrible Pets	E. B. White Read Aloud Award for Picture Book	Winner	
2011	Children Make Terrible Pets	Irma Black Award	Honor	
2011	Children Make Terrible Pets	NAIBA Books of the Year for Picture Book	Winner	
2012	You Will Be My Friend!	Irma Black Award	Winner	
2012	Children Make Terrible Pets	ALSC Notable Children's Videos	Selection	
2012	Children Make Terrible Pets	Carnegie Medal for Excellence in Children's Video	Winner	
2013	Mr. Tiger Goes Wild	ALSC Notable Children's Books	Selection	
2013	Mr. Tiger Goes Wild	Cybils Award for Fiction Picture Book	Winner	
2013	Mr. Tiger Goes Wild	Wanda Gag Read Aloud	Honor	
2014	Mr. Tiger Goes Wild	Boston Globe–Horn Book Award for Picture Book	Winner	
2014	Mr. Tiger Goes Wild	Bull-Bransom Award	Winner	
2014	Mr. Tiger Goes Wild	E. B. White Read Aloud Award for Picture Book	Honor	
2014	Mr. Tiger Goes Wild	Golden Kite Award for Picture Book Illustration	Winner	
2014	Mr. Tiger Goes Wild	NAIBA Books of the Year for Picture Book	Winner	
2016	The Wild Robot	Booklist Editors' Choice: Books for Youth	Selection	
2016	The Wild Robot	Goodreads Choice Award for Best Middle Grade & Children's	Nominee	
2017	The Wild Robot	ALSC Notable Children's Books	Selection	
2017	The Wild Robot	Charlotte Huck Award	Honor	
2019	The Wild Robot Escapes	ORCA Award for Upper Elementary	Winner	
2019	The Wild Robot Escapes	Nene Award	Runner-Up	
2021	Fred Gets Dressed	Booklist Editors' Choice: Books for Youth	Selection	
2023	The Wild Robot Protects	Buckeye Children's	Winner	

=== As illustrator ===
Four of the books Brown has illustrated are Junior Library Guild selections: Kaline Klattermaster’s Tree House (2008), Creepy Carrots! (2012), Creepy Pair of Underwear! (2017), and Creepy Crayon! (2022).

Creepy Carrots!, Creepy Pair of Underwear, and Creepy Crayon! are New York Times bestselling books. Creepy Carrots! is also an IndieBound bestseller.

In 2017, Amazon, the Los Angeles Public Library, and Kirkus Reviews named Creepy Pair of Underwear one of the best children's books of the year.

In 2022, Kirkus Reviews named Creepy Crayon! one of the best children's books of the year.

Awards for books Brown illustrated only
Year	Title	Award	Result	Ref.
2012	Creepy Carrots!	Cybils Award for Fiction Picture Book	Finalist	
2013	Creepy Carrots!	ALSC Notable Children's Books	Selection	
2013	Creepy Carrots!	Caldecott Medal	Honor	
2013	Creepy Carrots!	Crystal Kite Member Choice Award: Midwest	Winner	
2013	Creepy Carrots!	E.B. White Read Aloud Award for Picture Book	Honor	
2017	Creepy Pair of Underwear!	Cybils Award for Fiction Picture Book	Finalist	

== Publications ==
=== As writer and illustrator ===
- Flight of the Dodo (2005)
- Chowder (2006)
- The Fabulous Bouncing Chowder (2007)
- The Curious Garden (2009)
- Children Make Terrible Pets (2010)
- You Will Be My Friend! (2011)
- Mr. Tiger Goes Wild (2013)
- My Teacher is a Monster! (No, I Am Not.) (2014)
- The Wild Robot (2016)
- The Wild Robot Escapes (2017)
- Fred Gets Dressed (2021)
- The Wild Robot Protects (2023)
- The Wild Robot on the Island (2025)

=== As illustrator ===
- Barkbelly (2006) by Cat Weatherill
- Snowbone (2007) by Cat Weatherill
- Kaline Klattermaster’s Tree House (2008) by Haven Kimmel
- The Purple Kangaroo (2009) by Michael Ian Black
- Creepy Carrots! (2012) by Aaron Reynolds
- Creepy Pair of Underwear! (2017) by Aaron Reynolds
- Creepy Crayon! (2022) by Aaron Reynolds
- Troubling Tonsils! (2025) by Aaron Reynolds
- Unsettling Salad! (2026) by Aaron Reynolds
- Yarn Is Everything! (2026) by Aaron Reynolds
