= Creepy Crayon! =

2022 picture book by Aaron Reynolds

- First edition
- Author: Aaron Reynolds
- Illustrator: Peter Brown
- Language: English
- Genre: Horror stories
- Publisher: Simon & Schuster
- Publication date: August 23, 2022
- Publication place: United States
- Pages: 48
- ISBN: 978-1-5344-6588-6

Creepy Crayon! is a horror children's book written by Aaron Reynolds and illustrated by Peter Brown. The third book in the "Creepy Tales!" series, it was published by Simon & Schuster on August 23, 2022 and tells the story of Jasper, a young rabbit who finds and uses a possessed crayon in order to get good grades at school.

Creepy Crayon! was received positively by critics and was a top-selling children's fiction book in the United States.

== Reception ==
Kirkus Reviews compared Reynold's writing to Rod Serling's monologues due to "its perfectly paced foreboding and unsettling tension, both gentled by lightly ominous humor." They also praised Brown's illustration, who used a grayscale tone except for the crayon, calling this choice a callback to the old sci-fi thrillers, as well as an introduction to the horror genre for new readers. In their review for The Booklist, John Peters commented how the authors took "Harold and the Purple Crayon into the twilight zone." Peters called some of Brown's scenes "atmospherically shadowy" and noted young readers "will respond sympathetically to Jasper's sad expression" throughout his ordeal.

According to Publishers Weekly, Creepy Crayon! was the most sold picture book in the week of September 5, 2022, surpassing The Very Hungry Caterpillar.

== See also ==
- Creepy Carrots!
