= The Wild Robot =

2024 film by Chris Sanders

- Theatrical release poster
- Directed by: Chris Sanders
- Screenplay by: Chris Sanders
- Based on: The Wild Robot by Peter Brown
- Produced by: Jeff Hermann
- Starring: Lupita Nyong'o; Pedro Pascal; Kit Connor; Bill Nighy; Stephanie Hsu; Matt Berry; Ving Rhames; Mark Hamill; Catherine O'Hara
- Cinematography: Chris Stover
- Edited by: Mary Blee
- Music by: Kris Bowers
- Production company: DreamWorks Animation
- Distributed by: Universal Pictures
- Release dates: September 8, 2024 (TIFF); September 27, 2024 (United States)
- Running time: 102 minutes
- Country: United States
- Language: English
- Budget: $78 million
- Box office: $334.5 million

The Wild Robot is a 2024 American animated science fiction film written and directed by Chris Sanders, based on the 2016 novel by Peter Brown. It was produced by DreamWorks Animation, and features the voices of Lupita Nyong'o, Pedro Pascal, Kit Connor, Bill Nighy, Stephanie Hsu, Matt Berry, Ving Rhames, Mark Hamill, and Catherine O'Hara. The film follows a service robot (Nyong'o) shipwrecked on an island who must adapt to her surroundings, build relationships with the local wildlife and become the adoptive mother of an orphaned goose (Connor).

DreamWorks Animation bought the screenplay before the first novel's release in 2016. Sanders first encountered the original book through his daughter and was offered an opportunity to direct a film adaptation at DreamWorks. The film's visuals use a watercolor aesthetic, inspired by classic Disney animated films and the works of Hayao Miyazaki. Kris Bowers composed the score, marking his first score for a fully animated film. Development took four years on a budget of $78 million.

The Wild Robot premiered at the 49th Toronto International Film Festival on September 8, 2024, and was released in the United States on September 27, by Universal Pictures. The film received widespread acclaim from critics who praised it for its writing, animation, characters, score, visuals, emotional depth and voice acting. The film was a commercial success, grossing $334.5 million worldwide. Among its accolades, it received nine Annie Awards (including Best Animated Feature), won Best Animated Feature at the Critics' Choice Awards and Producers Guild of America Awards, and was nominated for four Golden Globe Awards and three Academy Awards, becoming DreamWorks' most-nominated film at the latter ceremony. A sequel based on Brown's second book The Wild Robot Escapes is in development.

== Plot ==
A storm causes a Universal Dynamics cargo ship to lose six ROZZUM robots, which wash up on an uninhabited island. Only Unit 7134 survives and is accidentally activated by wildlife. "Roz" is called a monster by the frightened wildlife and injures herself trying to help them. Unable to find anyone needing her services, even after learning how to communicate with all animals, she signals for retrieval, but gets struck by lightning and is attacked by animals. While fleeing from an aggressive grizzly bear named Thorn, Roz accidentally crushes a goose nest, resulting in the destruction of all but one egg.

After Roz protects the egg from a hungry red fox named Fink, a gosling hatches, imprints on her and accidentally breaks her long-range transmitter. A mother opossum named Pinktail "provides" Roz with the task of caring for the gosling to ensure he can eat, swim, and fly by himself before the winter migration. Fink discovers he can benefit from Roz, who builds a shelter. Roz names the gosling Brightbill, and the three cohabitate. As Brightbill grows up, he is rejected by other geese. Upon discovering that Roz accidentally killed his family, Brightbill feels betrayed.

Roz reconstructs ROZZUM unit 6262, nicknames her "Rummage", and asks for advice. Rummage, giving her transmitter to Roz, tells her to return to the Universal Dynamics factory. Roz enlists the help of a peregrine falcon named Thunderbolt to help Brightbill learn to fly and receives advice from Longneck, a leader for the geese's migration, allowing Brightbill to master flying just in time to join the migration. Missing Brightbill and unsure of her continued purpose, Roz reactivates her transmitter but shuts it off immediately after Universal Dynamics detects her signal.

During the migration, a thunderstorm forces the geese to shelter inside a Universal Dynamics greenhouse, triggering a contamination alert that sets reconnaissance (RECO) robots after them. Longneck sacrifices himself so Brightbill can lead the flock to safety. Meanwhile, Roz and Fink save the island's animals during a severe snowstorm, urging them to a truce supported by Thorn before Roz powers down.

By springtime, Roz reawakens to find the animals still following the truce and Brightbill returning, hailed as a hero. Shortly after, a Universal Dynamics dropship captained by a Virtual Observational Neutralizing Troublesome Retrieval Authority ("Vontra") robot arrives to recover Roz. Roz flees with Fink, pursued by RECO robots dispatched by Vontra. The animals band together to fight off the RECOs, but Vontra detonates the damaged RECOs to incapacitate and capture Roz, starting a forest fire in the process. The geese and Thunderbolt attack the dropship so Brightbill can save Roz as Fink and the others extinguish the fire. Despite Roz appearing to have been shut down by Vontra, her love for Brightbill restores her systems. Roz destroys Vontra and evacuates Brightbill as the dropship explodes.

Roz decides to return to Universal Dynamics to protect the island from future attacks but promises to return. The animals continue to live together on the island while Roz works at another Universal Dynamics greenhouse, maintaining her memories. Brightbill visits her and the two embrace.

== Voice cast ==
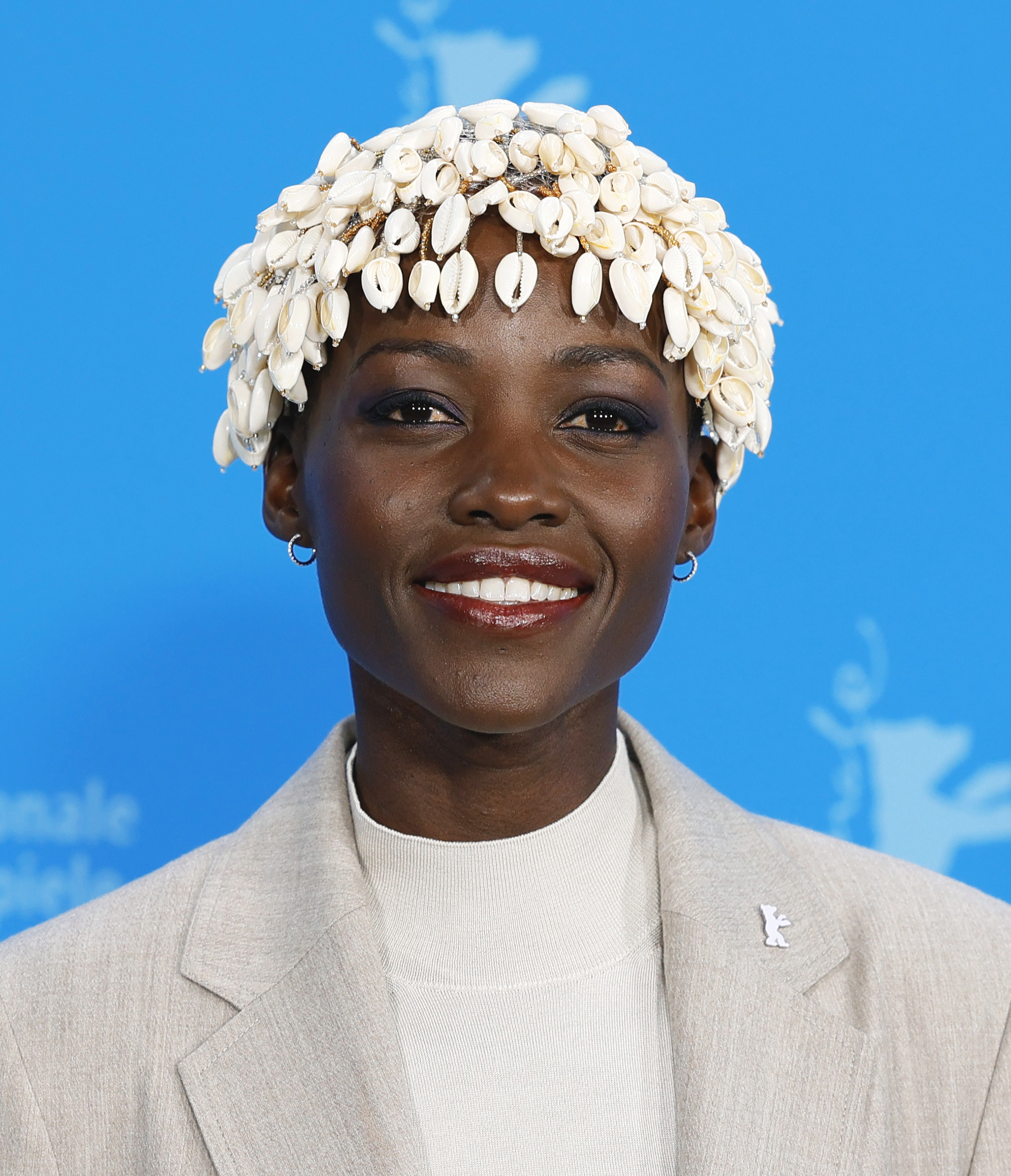
Lupita Nyong'o voices Roz and Rummage.

- Lupita Nyong'o as:
  - ROZZUM unit 7134 ("Roz"), an abandoned robot from the tech company Universal Dynamics that was washed onto an island and learns to adapt to the new environment. The name of her product line, ROZZUM, and her manufacturer are references to Rossum's Universal Robots, the play that created the term "robot".
  - ROZZUM unit 6262 ("Rummage"), a broken robot that was washed onto the same island as Roz who gives Roz her transmitter to return home
- Pedro Pascal as Fink, a sly but well-meaning red fox who is the first animal that Roz befriends
  - Finnegan and other foxes from the SaveAFox Rescue provide Fink's vocal effects.
- Kit Connor as Brightbill, an orphaned runt Barnacle goose who is raised by Roz as her own son after she accidentally killed his biological family
  - Boone Storme as Baby Brightbill
- Catherine O'Hara as Pinktail, a maternal Virginia opossum who gives Roz advice on raising Brightbill.
- Bill Nighy as Longneck, a wise, elderly barnacle goose who helps Roz understand teaching Brightbill how to fly
- Stephanie Hsu as Vontra (short for Virtual Observational Neutralizing Troublesome Retrieval Authority), a callous, tentacled robot sent by Universal Dynamics to retrieve Roz
- Mark Hamill as Thorn, an aggressive grizzly bear and the island's apex predator who later befriends Roz and the other animals during the winter truce
- Matt Berry as Paddler, a neurotic beaver who spends his days trying to gnaw down a giant tree
- Ving Rhames as Thunderbolt, a peregrine falcon who helps Brightbill learn to fly
- Randy Thom as the RECOs, reconnaissance robots designed by Universal Dynamics to serve Vontra

== Production ==
=== Development ===
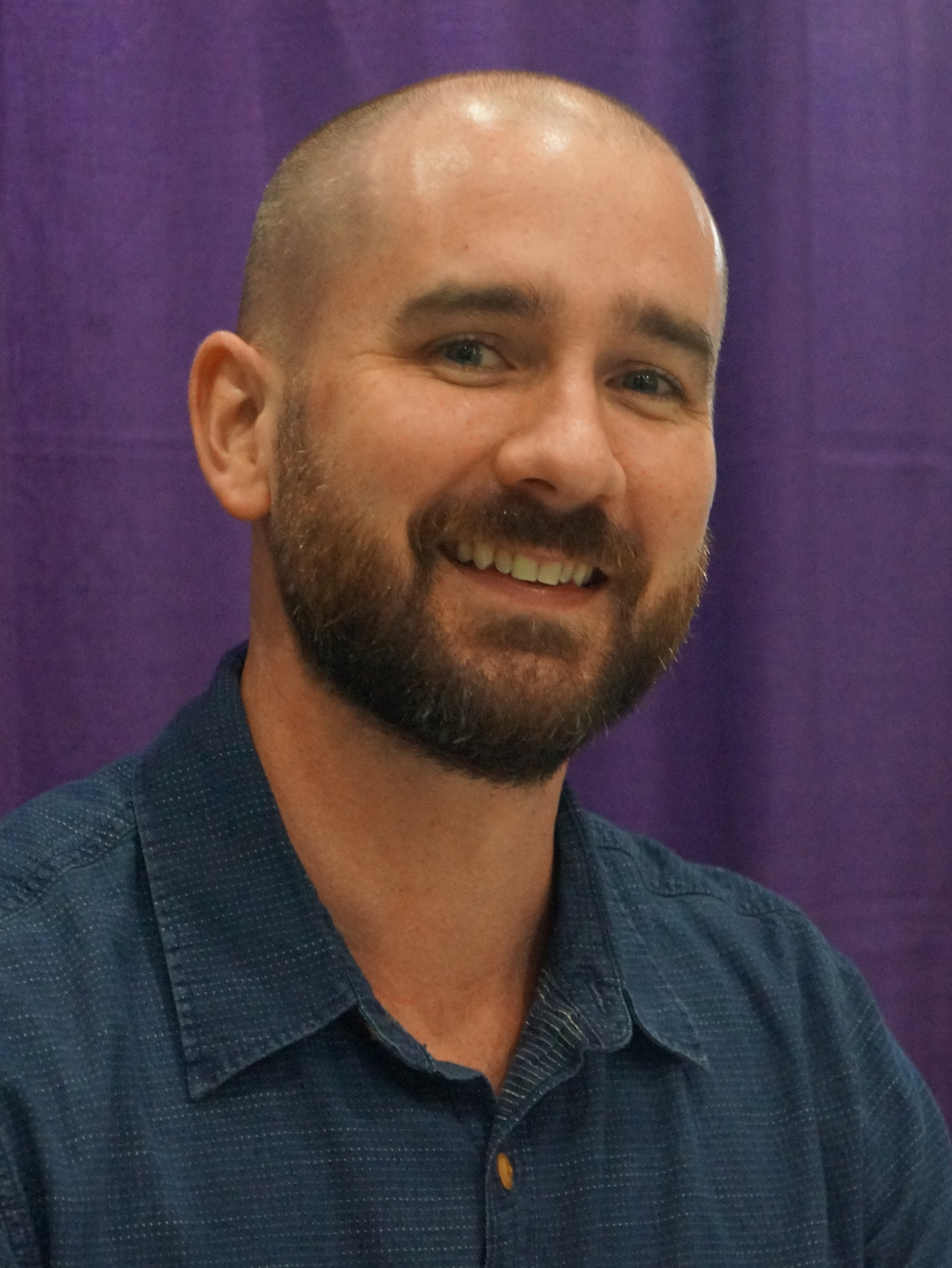
Peter Brown, creator of The Wild Robot book series, pictured in 2014.

Before the release of The Wild Robot—a novel created by Peter Brown—in 2016, DreamWorks Animation bought the screenplay, setting the budget at $78 million. Chris Sanders first encountered Brown's book through his daughter, though he never read it himself. Years later, while looking for his next project at DreamWorks, Sanders was offered an opportunity to write and direct an adaptation of the book for the studio. Upon reading it, Sanders immediately fell in love with the story and felt he was the right person to adapt it to film. He described the book as "deceptively simple" and "emotionally complex". Sanders had previously considered the idea of a creature bonding with animals in a forest for his directorial debut Lilo & Stitch (2002). Sanders contacted Brown and would later describe the phone call as critical to the film's development. Brown told the production team that his intended theme for the book was that kindness could be a survival skill. Sanders sought to weave that theme through the film and felt he achieved that goal. Another theme in the story that Sanders was drawn to was that of motherhood. He felt he had never done a story of this nature before. Development took four years.

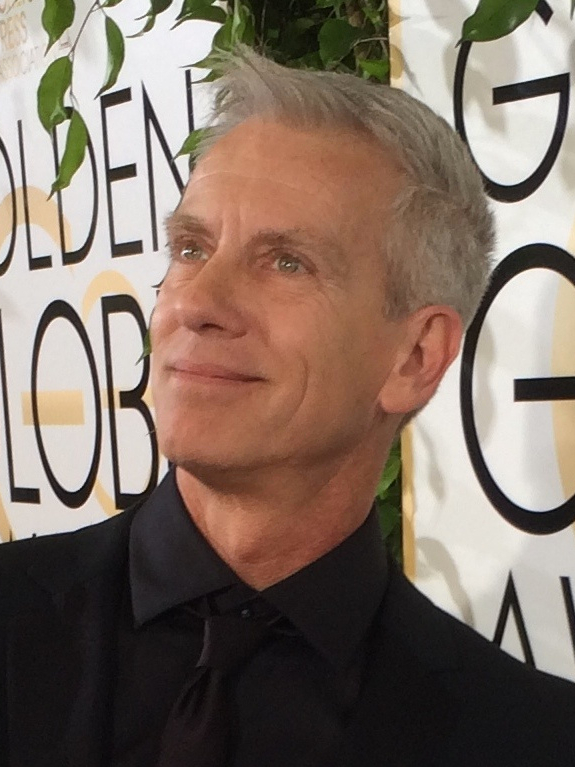
Chris Sanders, writer–director of The Wild Robot film, pictured in 2014.

Changes were made to the book's story for the film. In the book, Roz is in constant search of a task but also in the wrong place and with no one to give her tasks. Sanders felt that she risked becoming monotonous at points in the story, so he strived to make Roz constantly interesting and compelling throughout. Some character roles from the book were reduced in order to give others more substantial screen time and impact. The changes to the characters and their roles were also made to prevent the film from overcrowding.

=== Casting ===
Cast members Lupita Nyong'o, Pedro Pascal, Catherine O'Hara, Bill Nighy, Kit Connor, Mark Hamill, Matt Berry and Ving Rhames were revealed on March 5, 2024, with the release of the film's first trailer.

Sanders wanted Roz to be a compelling character and felt an extraordinary voice performance was necessary to achieve this. He wanted to avoid a two-dimensional fictional take on a robot, where they go straight from being emotionless to emotional. Nyong'o was tasked with finding a voice for the character and evolving it as the story progressed. The actress's role was particularly important as Roz did not possess facial articulation. This meant Nyong'o's voice was the main way of signifying Roz's emotions.

According to Hamill, who voiced Thorn, he learned about the film after reading the book The Wild Robot. Hamill says that The Wild Robot reminded him of his first feelings about Star Wars (1977), in which he originated the role of Luke Skywalker.

=== Animation and design ===
The Wild Robot would be the final film to be animated entirely in-house at DreamWorks, as Cartoon Brew reported on October 6, 2023, that the studio would be shifting away from producing films in-house in their Glendale campus to relying more heavily on outside studios after 2024. Additional character rigging was done by French studio Stim Studio.

After reading the book, Sanders felt the story's innocent tone and natural setting required a look that strayed away from the standard CGI photorealism in many modern animated films. He and production designer Raymond Zibach wanted the film in its finished state to still resemble the concept paintings. To achieve this, the production team built upon the technologies used in two of DreamWorks' earlier films, Puss in Boots: The Last Wish and The Bad Guys (both 2022). While the characters were made up of CGI geometrical shapes, their surfaces possess a hand-painted look. This painterly style philosophy was carried onto every visual element in the film, including the sky and environments.

Sanders took inspiration from classic Disney animated movies and the works of Hayao Miyazaki, resulting in a stylized CG visual style that he described as "a Monet painting in a Miyazaki forest". He considered Bambi (1942) and My Neighbour Totoro (1988) as the biggest influences on the visuals. The works of Syd Mead served as inspiration for the futuristic parts of the film. Sondra L. Verlander supervised the film's CG in the lighting department, while Steven MacLeod served as storyboard artist.

Sanders wanted Roz's design to be memorable, and one that would take its place among fiction's most famous robots. Taking inspiration from C-3PO and R2-D2 from Star Wars and Robby the Robot from Forbidden Planet (1956), he wanted Roz to have little facial articulation. Sanders and the rest of the design team made several prototype designs during production. One of the designers, Hyun Huh presented his Roz design to the crew, which became the basis for the one seen in the film. The crew immediately fell in love with Huh's design, with Sanders describing it as simple and appealing. Brown's original book described Roz with great detail, so Sanders and the team knew they had to leave some design elements out. Although on behalf of Brown's description of what a ROZZUM unit's purpose was to humans, they aimed for Roz's design to be humanoid.

=== Music ===
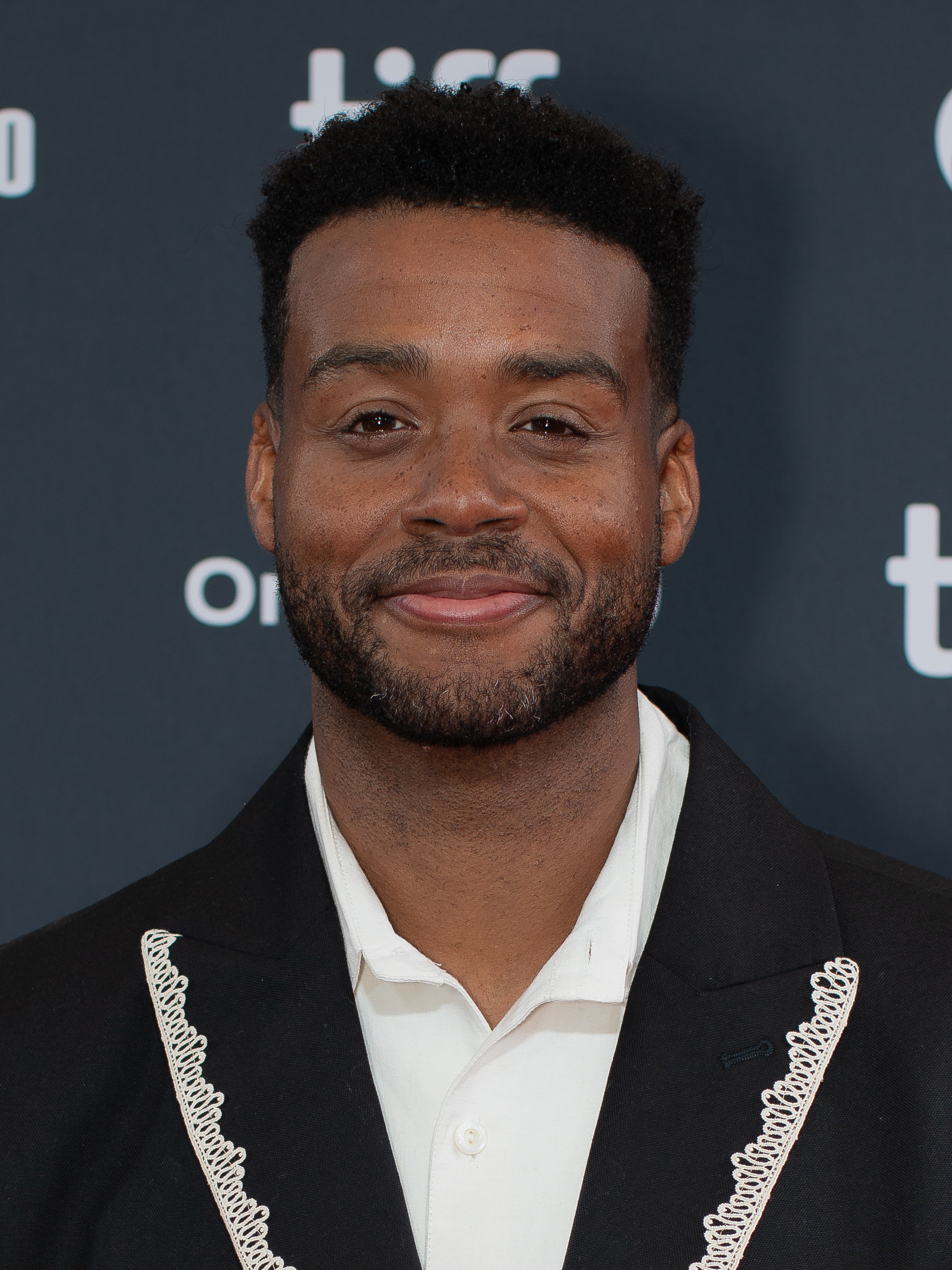
Kris Bowers composed the film's score.

In March 2024, Kris Bowers was revealed to be composing the score, his first score for a fully animated film. Additionally, two original songs were announced to be made for the film, performed and co-written by Maren Morris. The first, "Kiss the Sky", was released on August 28; the second, "Even When I'm Not", along with the full soundtrack album, was released on September 27. Morris and her team of co-writers were inspired to write a second song for the film, "Even When I'm Not", which is featured in the film's end credits, when they screened the finished film.

== Themes ==
The Wild Robot incorporates environmental themes throughout its narrative, including a reference to climate change in a sequence depicting a futuristic San Francisco with a partially submerged Golden Gate Bridge. DreamWorks Animation developed the film in collaboration with both Universal's GreenerLight Program and the Natural Resources Defense Council's Rewrite the Future initiative, with environmental experts consulting on the ecological elements and a sustainability-focused PSA featuring Lupita Nyong'o. The film's environmental themes were showcased at Climate Week NYC 2024, where it received a special screening at the inaugural Climate Film Festival.

== Release ==
The Wild Robot had its world premiere as the opening front runner of the Toronto International Film Festival Grand Opening celebration on September 8, 2024. It was initially scheduled for release on September 20, but was postponed to September 27. This shift was reportedly made to avoid competition with Transformers One.

On December 29, 2024, it was announced that The Wild Robot would be re-released in theaters in the US on January 17, 2025.

=== Marketing ===
The first trailer for the film, featuring a rendition of Louis Armstrong's "What a Wonderful World", plus a poster, were released on March 5, 2024. The trailer debuted in theaters three days later in front of screenings of DreamWorks' other new film Kung Fu Panda 4. Writing for Polygon, Tasha Robinson compared the design of Roz to familiar film robots such as BB-8 (the Star Wars sequel trilogy), WALL-E (in his titular film), Baymax (from Big Hero 6), and The Iron Giant (in his titular film), and noted that the only words spoken in the trailer - "Sometimes, to survive, we must become more than we were programmed to be" - evoked the message of The Iron Giant (1999).

=== Home media ===
The Wild Robot was released to rent on digital streaming on October 15, 2024, and on Blu-ray and DVD on December 3.

== Reception ==
=== Box office ===
The Wild Robot has grossed $143.9 million in the United States and Canada, and $189.9 million in other territories for a worldwide total of $334.1 million.

In the United States and Canada, The Wild Robot was released alongside Megalopolis, and was projected to gross $24–30 million from 3,962 theaters in its opening weekend. The film made $11.2 million on its first day, including an estimated $1.9 million from Thursday previews. The film went on to debut to $35.8 million, slightly above predictions and topping the box office. In its second weekend, the film made $18.9 million (a drop of 47% from its first weekend), finishing in second behind newcomer Joker: Folie à Deux. In its third weekend the film made $14 million (dropping just 25.9%), finishing in second behind newcomer Terrifier 3. The film then made $10.1 million and $6.8 million in its fourth and fifth weekends, respectively.

=== Critical response ===
On the review aggregator website Rotten Tomatoes, 97% of 259 critics' reviews are positive, with an average rating of 8.4/10. The website's consensus reads: "A simple tale told with great sophistication, The Wild Robot is wondrous entertainment that dazzles the eye while filling your heart to the brim." It is DreamWorks Animation's second highest-rated film on the site, behind How to Train Your Dragon (2010). Metacritic, which uses a weighted average, assigned the film a score of 85 out of 100, based on 46 critics, indicating "universal acclaim". Audiences polled by CinemaScore gave the film an average grade of "A" on an A+ to F scale, while those surveyed by PostTrak gave it a 96% overall positive score, with 62% saying they would definitely recommend it.

Natalia Winkelman of The New York Times called the film "a dazzling triumph of animation" and wrote "this is a work that cares most about two things: big feelings and great beauty". Pete Hammond of Deadline Hollywood said, "If Spielberg's E.T. had been an animated film instead, it might resemble what writer-director Chris Sanders has created here. However, Wild Robot weaves its own magic and for that we can all cry tears of joy." Adrian Horton, writing for The Guardian said: "Clever, heartfelt and frequently stunning, The Wild Robot offers the type of all-ages-welcome animated entertainment that will delight kids and leave a lump in one's throat." Adam Graham of Detroit News gave it a "B-" and wrote: "It's heartwarming the way a latter-era Coldplay track is heartwarming: by design, so its effect feels somewhat synthetic." Robbie Collin of The Daily Telegraph gave the film a five out of five scoring, saying, "DreamWorks was founded 30 years ago this month, and this well-timed anniversary release is their richest, most moving film since 1998's reputation-making The Prince of Egypt." In his review for Vulture, Bilge Ebiri praised Nyong'o's performance and found that it "turn[ed] this heartwarming family film into an unforgettable one".

Collider thought it was one of Sanders's best films yet, while Screen Rant called it the best animated film of the year.

Filmmakers Tim Fehlbaum, Jeff Fowler, Reinaldo Marcus Green, Chad Hartigan, Matt Johnson, Dana Ledoux Miller and Juel Taylor all cited the film as among their favorites of 2024.

=== Viewership ===
According to data from Showlabs, The Wild Robot ranked fifth on Netflix in the United States during the week of 26 May–1 June 2025.

=== Accolades ===
Accolades received by The Wild Robot
Award	Date of ceremony	Category	Recipient(s)	Result	Ref.
Academy Awards	March 2, 2025	Best Animated Feature	Chris Sanders and Jeff Hermann	Nominated	
Academy Awards	March 2, 2025	Best Original Score	Kris Bowers	Nominated	
Academy Awards	March 2, 2025	Best Sound	Randy Thom, Brian Chumney, Gary A. Rizzo and Leff Lefferts	Nominated	
African-American Film Critics Association	December 13, 2024	Best Original Score	Kris Bowers	Won	
African-American Film Critics Association	December 13, 2024	Best Animated Feature	The Wild Robot	Won	
Alliance of Women Film Journalists	January 7, 2025	Best Animated Film	The Wild Robot	Won (Note: Tied with Flow)	
Alliance of Women Film Journalists	January 7, 2025	Best Adapted Screenplay	Chris Sanders & Peter Brown	Nominated	
Alliance of Women Film Journalists	January 7, 2025	Best Animated/Voice Performance	Lupita Nyong'o	Won	
American Cinema Editors Awards	March 14, 2025	Best Edited Animated Feature Film (Theatrical or Non-Theatrical)	Mary Blee	Won	
Annie Awards	February 8, 2025	Best Animated Feature	The Wild Robot	Won	
Annie Awards	February 8, 2025	Outstanding Achievement for Animated Effects in an Animated Production	Derek Cheung, Michael Losure, David Chow, Nyoung Kim, Steve Avoujageli	Won	
Annie Awards	February 8, 2025	Outstanding Achievement for Character Animation in an Animated Feature Production	Fabio Lignini	Won	
Annie Awards	February 8, 2025	Outstanding Achievement for Character Design in an Animated Feature Production	Genevieve Tsai	Won	
Annie Awards	February 8, 2025	Outstanding Achievement for Directing in an Animated Feature Production	Chris Sanders	Won	
Annie Awards	February 8, 2025	Outstanding Achievement for Editorial in an Animated Feature Production	Mary Blee, Collin Erker, Orlando Duenas, Lucie Lyon, Brian Parker	Won	
Annie Awards	February 8, 2025	Outstanding Achievement for Music in an Animated Feature Production	Kris Bowers	Won	
Annie Awards	February 8, 2025	Outstanding Achievement for Production Design in an Animated Feature Production	Raymond Zibach, Ritchie Sacilioc	Won	
Annie Awards	February 8, 2025	Outstanding Achievement for Voice Acting in an Animated Feature Production	Lupita Nyong'o	Won	
Annie Awards	February 8, 2025	Outstanding Achievement for Voice Acting in an Animated Feature Production	Kit Connor	Nominated	
Art Directors Guild Awards	February 15, 2025	Excellence in Production Design for an Animated Film	Raymond Zibach	Won	
Artios Awards	February 12, 2025	Outstanding Achievement in Casting – Feature Animation	Christi Soper Hilt	Won	
Astra Film and Creative Arts Awards	December 8, 2024	Best Animated Feature	The Wild Robot	Won	
Astra Film and Creative Arts Awards	December 8, 2024	Best Voice Over Performance	Lupita Nyong'o	Won	
Astra Film and Creative Arts Awards	December 8, 2024	Best Voice Over Performance	Pedro Pascal	Nominated	
Astra Film and Creative Arts Awards	December 8, 2024	Best Original Score	Kris Bowers	Nominated	
Astra Film and Creative Arts Awards	December 8, 2024	Best Original Song	"Kiss the Sky" – Maren Morris, Ali Tamposi, Michael Pollack, Delacey, Jordan Johnson & Stefan Johnson	Nominated	
Austin Film Critics Association	January 6, 2025	Best Animated Film	The Wild Robot	Won	
Austin Film Critics Association	January 6, 2025	Best Original Score	Kris Bowers	Nominated	
Austin Film Critics Association	January 6, 2025	Best Voice Acting/Animated/Digital Performance	Lupita Nyong'o	Won	
British Academy Film Awards	February 16, 2025	Best Animated Film	The Wild Robot	Nominated	
British Academy Film Awards	February 16, 2025	Best Children's & Family Film	The Wild Robot	Nominated	
British Academy Film Awards	February 16, 2025	Best Original Music	Kris Bowers	Nominated	
Black Film Critics Circle Awards	February 19, 2024	Best Animated Film	The Wild Robot	Won	
Black Reel Awards	February 17, 2025	Outstanding Voice Performance	Lupita Nyong'o	Won	
Black Reel Awards	February 17, 2025	Outstanding Score	Kris Bowers	Won	
Black Reel Awards	February 17, 2025	Outstanding Soundtrack	The Wild Robot (Original Soundtrack)	Nominated	
Celebration of Cinema and Television	December 9, 2024	Composer Award	Kris Bowers	Won	
Chicago Film Critics Association	December 12, 2024	Best Animated Film	The Wild Robot	Nominated	
Chicago Film Critics Association	December 12, 2024	Best Original Score	Kris Bowers	Nominated	
Chicago Indie Critics Awards	January 17, 2024	Best Animated Film	The Wild Robot	Won	
Chicago Indie Critics Awards	January 17, 2024	Best Adapted Screenplay	The Wild Robot	Nominated	
Chicago Indie Critics Awards	January 17, 2024	Best Original Score	The Wild Robot	Won	
Chicago Indie Critics Awards	January 17, 2024	Best Original Song	Kiss The Sky - The Wild Robot	Nominated	
Chicago Indie Critics Awards	January 17, 2024	Best Sound	The Wild Robot	Nominated	
Chicago Indie Critics Awards	January 17, 2024	Breakout Artist	Kris Bowers	Nominated	
Chicago Indie Critics Awards	January 17, 2024	Sight Unseen award	Lupita Nyong'o	Won	
Chicago Indie Critics Awards	January 17, 2024	Sight Unseen award	Pedro Pascal	Nominated	
Cinema Audio Society Awards	February 22, 2025	Outstanding Achievement in Sound Mixing for Motion Picture – Animated	Ken Gombos, Leff Lefferts, Gary A. Rizzo, Alan Meyerson, Richard Duarte	Won	
Critics Association of Central Florida	January 2, 2025	Best Animated Film	The Wild Robot	Won	
Critics Association of Central Florida	January 2, 2025	Best Original Song	"Kiss the Sky"	Won	
Critics Association of Central Florida	January 2, 2025	Best Hybrid Performance	Lupita Nyong'o	Won	
Critics' Choice Movie Awards	February 7, 2025	Best Animated Feature Film	The Wild Robot	Won	
Critics' Choice Movie Awards	February 7, 2025	Best Song	"Kiss the Sky" – Maren Morris	Nominated	
Critics' Choice Movie Awards	February 7, 2025	Best Score	Kris Bowers	Nominated	
Critics' Choice Super Awards	August 7, 2025	Best Science Friction/Fantasy Movie	The Wild Robot	Nominated	
Critics' Choice Super Awards	August 7, 2025	Best Actress in a Science Friction/Fantasy Movie	Lupita Nyong'o	Nominated	
Dallas–Fort Worth Film Critics Association	December 18, 2024	Best Animated Film	The Wild Robot	Won	
Dallas–Fort Worth Film Critics Association	December 18, 2024	Best Musical Score	Kris Bowers	Won	
Dublin Film Critics Circle	December 19, 2024	Best Film	The Wild Robot	5th Place	
Florida Film Critics Circle	December 20, 2024	Best Animated Film	The Wild Robot	Nominated	
Golden Reel Awards	February 23, 2025	Outstanding Achievement in Sound Editing – Feature Animation	Brian Chumney, Leff Lefferts, Randy Thom, David Farmer, David Hughes, Jamey Scott, Rich Quinn, Malcolm Fife, Dee Selby, Ronni Brown, Jana Vance	Won	
Golden Globe Awards	January 5, 2025	Best Animated Feature Film	The Wild Robot	Nominated	
Golden Globe Awards	January 5, 2025	Cinematic and Box Office Achievement	The Wild Robot	Nominated	
Golden Globe Awards	January 5, 2025	Best Original Song	"Kiss the Sky" – Maren Morris, Ali Tamposi, Michael Pollack, Delacey, Jordan Johnson & Stefan Johnson	Nominated	
Golden Globe Awards	January 5, 2025	Best Original Score	Kris Bowers	Nominated	
Golden Trailer Awards	May 29, 2025	Best Animation/Family TV Spot (for a Feature Film)	Universal Pictures / Inside Job (for "Academy Love#)	Won	
Golden Trailer Awards	May 29, 2025	Best Digital – Animation/Family	Universal Pictures / Inside Job (for "Organic Social/Meet the Cast 1/4×5")	Nominated	
Golden Trailer Awards	May 29, 2025	Best Animation/Family Poster	Universal Pictures / AV Print & DreamWorks Animation (for "Payoff Poster")	Nominated	
Golden Trailer Awards	May 29, 2025	Best International Poster	Universal Pictures / AV Print & DreamWorks Animation (for "International Payoff Poster")	Nominated	
Grammy Awards	February 1, 2026	Best Score Soundtrack For Visual Media	Kris Bowers	Nominated	
Heartland Film Festival	2024	Truly Moving Picture Award	The Wild Robot	Won	
Hollywood Music in Media Awards	November 20, 2024	Best Original Score – Animated Film	Kris Bowers	Won	
Hollywood Music in Media Awards	November 20, 2024	Best Original Song – Animated Film	"Kiss the Sky" – Maren Morris, Ali Tamposi, Michael Pollack, Delacey, Jordan Johnson & Stefan Johnson	Won	
Houston Film Critics Society Awards	January 14, 2025	Best Animated Feature	The Wild Robot	Won	
Houston Film Critics Society Awards	January 14, 2025	Best Original Score	Kris Bowers	Nominated	
Houston Film Critics Society Awards	January 14, 2025	Best Original Song	"Kiss the Sky"	Won	
Hugo Awards	August 16, 2025	Best Dramatic Presentation, Long Form	Chris Sanders and Peter Brown	Nominated	
Kansas City Film Critics Circle	January 4, 2025	Best Animated Feature	The Wild Robot	Won	
Kansas City Film Critics Circle	January 4, 2025	Best Adapted Screenplay	The Wild Robot	Nominated	
Kansas City Film Critics Circle	January 4, 2025	Best Original Score	Kris Bowers	Nominated	
London Film Critics' Circle	February 2, 2025	Best Animated Feature	The Wild Robot	Nominated	
New York Film Critics Online	December 16, 2024	Best Animation	The Wild Robot	Runner up	
NAACP Image Awards	February 22, 2025	Outstanding Animated Motion Picture	The Wild Robot	Nominated	
NAACP Image Awards	February 22, 2025	Outstanding Character Voice Performance – Motion Picture	Lupita Nyong'o	Nominated	
Nickelodeon Kids' Choice Awards	June 21, 2025	Favorite Animated Movie	The Wild Robot	Nominated	
Nickelodeon Kids' Choice Awards	June 21, 2025	Favorite Female Voice from an Animated Movie	Lupita Nyong'o	Nominated	
Nickelodeon Kids' Choice Awards	June 21, 2025	Favorite Song from a Movie	"Kiss The Sky" – Maren Morris	Nominated	
Online Film Critics Society Awards	January 27, 2025	Best Animated Feature	The Wild Robot	Nominated	
Online Film Critics Society Awards	January 27, 2025	Best Original Score	Kris Bowers	Nominated	
Producers Guild of America Awards	February 8, 2025	Outstanding Producer of Animated Theatrical Motion Pictures	The Wild Robot	Won	
Saturn Awards	February 2, 2025	Best Animated Film	The Wild Robot	Won	
San Diego Film Critics Society	December 9, 2024	Best Adapted Screenplay	Chris Sanders	Nominated	
San Diego Film Critics Society	December 9, 2024	Best Animated Film	The Wild Robot	Runner-up	
Satellite Awards	January 26, 2025	Best Motion Picture – Animated or Mixed Media	The Wild Robot	Nominated	
Satellite Awards	January 26, 2025	Best Original Score	Kris Bowers	Nominated	
Satellite Awards	January 26, 2025	Best Original Song	"Kiss the Sky" – Delacey, Jordan Johnson, Stefan Johnson, Maren Morris, Michael Pollack, and Ali Tamposi	Nominated	
San Sebastián International Film Festival	September 28, 2024	Lurra - Greenpeace Award	The Wild Robot	Won	
San Francisco Bay Area Film Critics Circle	December 15, 2024	Best Animated Feature	The Wild Robot	Nominated	
San Francisco Bay Area Film Critics Circle	December 15, 2024	Best Original Score	Kris Bowers	Nominated	
SCAD Savannah Film Festival	November 2, 2024	Virtuoso Award	Lupita Nyong'o	Won	
Seattle Film Critics Society	December 16, 2024	Best Original Score	Kris Bowers	Nominated	
Seattle Film Critics Society	December 16, 2024	Best Animated Film	The Wild Robot	Won	
Society of Composers & Lyricists	February 12, 2025	Outstanding Original Score for a Studio Film	Kris Bowers	Won	
St. Louis Film Critics Association	December 15, 2024	Best Animated Feature	The Wild Robot	Won	
St. Louis Film Critics Association	December 15, 2024	Best Score	Kris Bowers	Nominated	
St. Louis Film Critics Association	December 15, 2024	Best Voice Performance	Lupita Nyong'o	Won	
St. Louis Film Critics Association	December 15, 2024	Best Voice Performance	Pedro Pascal	Nominated	
Toronto Film Critics Association	February 24, 2025	Best Animated Feature	The Wild Robot	Nominated	
USC Scripter Awards	February 22, 2025	Best Adapted Screenplay	Chris Sanders and Peter Brown	Nominated	
Visual Effects Society Awards	February 11, 2025	Outstanding Visual Effects in an Animated Feature	Chris Sanders, Jeff Hermann, Jeff Budsberg and Jacob Hjort Jensen	Won	
Visual Effects Society Awards	February 11, 2025	Outstanding Animated Character in an Animated Feature	"Roz" – Fabio Lignini, Yukinori Inagaki, Owen Demers and Hyun Huh	Won	
Visual Effects Society Awards	February 11, 2025	Outstanding Created Environment in an Animated Feature	"The Forest" – John Wake, He Jung Park, Woojin Choi and Shane Glading	Won	
Visual Effects Society Awards	February 11, 2025	Outstanding Effects Simulations in an Animated Feature	Derek Cheung, Michael Losure, David Chow and Nyoung Kim	Won	
Visual Effects Society Awards	February 11, 2025	Outstanding Compositing and Lighting in a Feature	Sondra L. Verlander, Baptiste Van Opstal, Eszter Offertaler and Austin Casale	Nominated	
Washington D.C. Area Film Critics Association	December 8, 2024	Best Animated Feature	The Wild Robot	Won	
Washington D.C. Area Film Critics Association	December 8, 2024	Best Original Score	Kris Bowers	Nominated	
Washington D.C. Area Film Critics Association	December 8, 2024	Best Voice Performance	Lupita Nyong'o	Won	

== Sequel ==
In September 2024, when asked about a potential sequel, Sanders stated, "I would very much like to. This was a labor of love on the part of everybody at the studio, and yes, I think I'd love to go and stay here for a while." In October 2024, he confirmed that a sequel is in development.

In March 2026, it was announced that Troy Quane would direct the sequel, based on and titled after Brown's second book The Wild Robot Escapes, with head of story Heidi Jo Gilbert co-directing and Sanders returning to write the screenplay.

== See also ==
- Robot Dreams, a 2023 animated feature adaptation of a graphic novel also featuring robots and animals
