= Peter Brown (footballer, born 1961) =

English footballer (born 1961)

Peter Ronald Brown
Personal information
- Full name: Peter Ronald Brown
- Date of birth: 1 September 1961 (age 65)
- Place of birth: Hemel Hempstead, England
- Height: 5 ft 10 in (1.78 m)
- Position: Right back

Senior career*
Years	Team	Apps	(Gls)
1979–1980	Chelsea	0	(0)
1980–1982	Wimbledon	55	(3)
1982	Tring Town	?	(?)
1982–1989	Barnet	214	(11)
Total		269	(14)
- * Club domestic league appearances and goals

Peter Ronald Brown (born 1 September 1961) is an English former professional footballer who played in the Football League, as a right back. Peter was presented with Barnet Football Club's Player of the Season in 1984–85.

== Honours ==
Wimbledon

- Football League Group Cup runner-up: 1981–82
