= Bad Kitty (book series) =

Children's book series by Nick Bruel

- The cover of second box set in the series, "Bad Kitty's Very, Very Bad Boxed Set"
- Author: Nick Bruel
- Illustrator: Nick Bruel
- Cover artist: Nick Bruel
- Language: English
- Genre: Comedy
- Publisher: Mcmillan (Neal Porter books, Roaring Brook Press); Scholastic Corporation
- Publication date: 2005 (original)
- Publication place: United States
- Media type: Print (hardback & paperback)

Bad Kitty is a series of American children's books by Nick Bruel, about a housecat named Kitty, who often wreaks havoc about her owner's home. The first book, Bad Kitty, was a picture book, published in 2005, and featured Kitty encountering foods and doing activities categorized by the alphabet. It was followed by Poor Puppy, which deals with Kitty's housemate, Puppy. Bruel also created chapter books including Bad Kitty Gets a Bath, Happy Birthday, Bad Kitty, Bad Kitty vs. Uncle Murray: The Uproar at the Front Door, Bad Kitty Meets the Baby and Bad Kitty for President. The chapter books feature tips on caring for cats. In late 2011, Bruel published A Bad Kitty Christmas as a picture book. The series has spawned three boxed sets. A TV series based on the book series is currently in development.

== Characters ==
=== Main ===
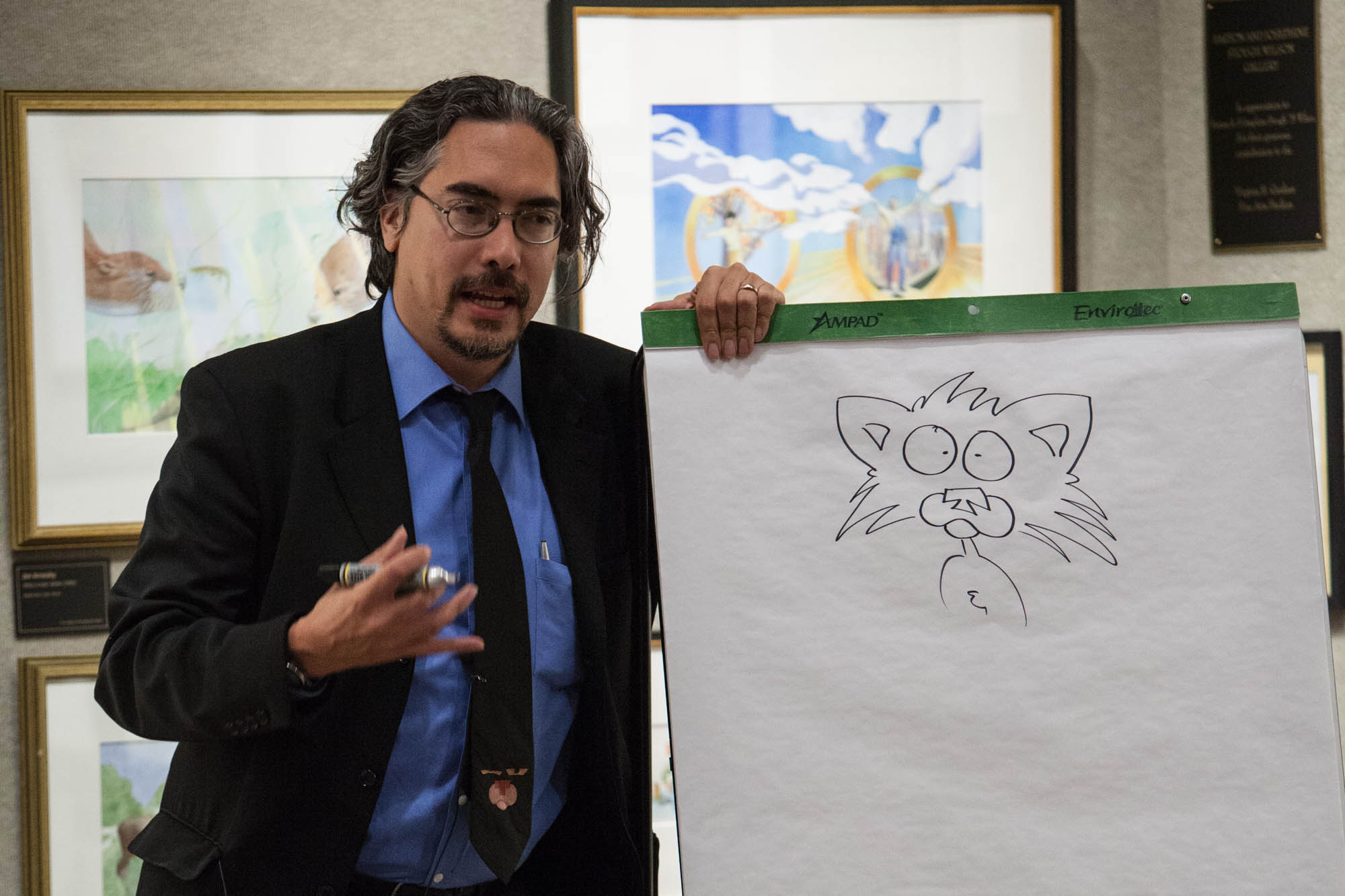
Nick Bruel draws Bad Kitty at Mazza Museum

- Kitty – The title character of the series; she is a housecat who wreaks havoc around her owner's home when she is in a bad mood, hence the name. She has black fur and a white tuft of fur on her chest. According to Bruel, Kitty is physically modeled after a cat named Zou-zou he had as a child who was all black except for a small tuft of white fur on her chest.
- Puppy – He is introduced in the series at the end of Bad Kitty and is the subject of the picture book Poor Puppy and the novel Puppy's Big Day.
- The owner – The narrator of the series. His face is not seen in the books.
- Uncle Murray – The owner's uncle, who is somewhat forgetful and lazy, but still kind and good with animals. Uncle Murray was only mentioned twice in the first book, Bad Kitty. In the chapter books, he is given sections called "Uncle Murray's Fun Facts". He is a major character in the book, Bad Kitty vs. Uncle Murray: The Uproar at the Front Door. His wife is named Jeannie. Bruel wrote that Murray is named after his real life Uncle Murray.
- Baby – A baby who causes a lot of trouble, who is introduced at the end of Bad Kitty vs. Uncle Murray. Her name is not known.

=== Kitty's friends ===
The following is a list of cats that make their debuts in Happy Birthday, Bad Kitty.

- Big Kitty – Big Kitty is a Maine Coon who is the biggest cat in the series.
- The Twin Kitties – The Twin Kitties are a pair of twin calico American Shorthairs who love to play.
- Stinky Kitty – Stinky Kitty is a gray Persian who is always getting dirty and smelly.
- Chatty Kitty – Chatty Kitty is a Siamese cat who is the most talkative cat in the neighborhood. The translations of her speech are presented as footnotes.
- Pretty Kitty – Pretty Kitty is a Turkish Angora who has won many cat shows and whom all of the male cats are in love with.
- Strange Kitty – Strange Kitty is a Sphynx who is called strange for reading comic books instead of (like cats) chasing mice. Unlike the other cats, Strange Kitty can talk.

=== Minor characters ===
- Power Mouse – Strange Kitty's buddy and sidekick. He is one of the only animal characters that can talk.
- Mama Kitty – Kitty's mother
- Old Lady – A senior woman that appeared in A Bad Kitty Christmas
- Old Kitty – The former president of the Neighborhood Cat Club
- Petunia – A bulldog and a student in Bad Kitty: School Daze. She is one of the only animal characters that can talk.
- Dr. Lagomorph – A rabbit and archenemy of Strange Kitty's alter ego, Captain Fantasticat. He is one of the few animal characters that can talk. Bruel mentioned that lagomorph is the biological name for the family of rabbits.
- The Chickens – There are two chickens that mainly appear in Bad Kitty Takes the Test and Bad Kitty Goes on Vacation, and have a business plan to open different places around the world that will attract people and their love of cats, only to try and change their minds and make chickens the house pet, and cats the farm animals that you eat on Thanksgiving dinners.

== Books ==
No.	Title	Date	Format	Length	ISBN
1	Bad Kitty	October 1, 2005	Picture book	40pp	978-1596430693
Kitty was a good kitty until her owners make her eat vegetables, listed from A to Z. Kitty is repulsed and becomes a bad kitty. She does a bunch of activities. The owners come back from the store and present Kitty with good food. Kitty is very happy, so she does some good activities. The owners then reward Kitty with a new friend: Puppy!
2	Poor Puppy; Poor Puppy and Bad Kitty	July 24, 2007	Picture book	40pp	978-1596432703
Puppy wants to play with Kitty, but Kitty refuses. Puppy ends up having to play by himself from "Airplane" to "Zoo Animals". He then naps and dreams of activities he can do with Kitty, from "Apple Bobbing in Antarctica" to "in Zimbabwe, they run Zig-Zags with a Zebra, a Zebu and a Zorilla". He wakes up and sees Kitty dangling a toy mouse in front of his face. He jumps up and chases Kitty.
3	Bad Kitty Gets a Bath	August 19, 2008	Chapter book	128pp	978-1596433410
Kitty needs a bath, but does everything she can to avoid it.
4	Happy Birthday, Bad Kitty	September 1, 2009	Chapter book	160pp	978-1596433427
Kitty prepares for her birthday party. She hopes to get a fancy scratching post. Kitty's friends come and bring presents, but trouble ensues. Marks a cameo of Kitty's mother, Mama Kitty.
5	Bad Kitty vs. Uncle Murray: The Uproar at the Front Door	August 31, 2010	Chapter book	160pp	978-1596435964
Kitty's owners are leaving for a week, but they bring Uncle Murray as a pet sitter. Kitty thinks Murray is scary and hides from him, only to be surprised as Murray almost sits on her or uses her as a dish rag. Kitty gets hungry, thinking of minutes like days, and hours like weeks. Murray talks about his old dog, then almost sucks Kitty with a vacuum cleaner. Kitty's friends raid the house and Murray leaves, taking Puppy with him. He later returns, and promises to take care of them. Kitty's owners return and bring a surprise guest: a new baby.
6	Bad Kitty Meets the Baby	June 7, 2011	Chapter book	144pp	978-1596435971
Bad Kitty is told she will get a surprise when her owners come home and she gets stuck with Puppy and Uncle Murray babysits her. He has to call the fire department several days in a row. When they come back, they have a baby which Kitty has no clue what she is. The other cats come and decide she is another kitty. They have a special Pussycat Olympics, but the baby wins all of the events, even the ones that Kitty expects to win. Kitty throws a tantrum and kicks everyone out. Kitty's owner tries to settle her down and then informs her the baby is adopted and needs love just like her. Kitty sympathizes and cries. Kitty tries to help the baby but then when it is bath time, she picks the baby up and runs off.
7	A Bad Kitty Christmas	September 13, 2011	Picture book	40pp	978-1596436688
Kitty wants a stack of food and her father Papa kitty. But when she gets on the naughty list for eating a baby bird, she tries everything she could to get on Santa's nice list!
8	Bad Kitty for President	January 17, 2012	Chapter book	144pp	978-1596436695
Kitty runs against Big Kitty to be president of the Neighborhood Cat Club.
9	Bad Kitty School Daze	January 8, 2013	Chapter book	160pp	978-1596436701
Kitty and Puppy go to obedience school, where their classmates are a cat-hating dog named Petunia and the insanely evil Dr. Lagomorph.
10	Bad Kitty Drawn to Trouble	January 7, 2014	Chapter book	128pp	978-1596436718
11	Puppy's Big Day	January 6, 2015	Chapter book	160pp	978-1596439764
Kitty keeps on having bad moods so Puppy decides to take a little vacation with Uncle Murray.
12	Bad Kitty Goes to the Vet	January 5, 2016	Chapter book	144pp	978-1596439771
When Bad Kitty is forced to visit the vet, she is put to sleep for surgery and has an odd dream in which she imagines that she is on the brink of death and must repent for her crimes against Puppy or be cast down into "Puppydog Paradise," which is kitty hell.
13	Scaredy-Cat	August 9, 2016	Picture book	32pp	978-1596439788
Bad Kitty wasn't always such a scaredy-cat. She used to be brave and lionhearted and nervy. That is, until one late October night a group of terrifying monsters showed up on her doorstop and Kitty became scared.
14	Bad Kitty Takes the Test	January 3, 2017	Chapter book	144pp	978-1626725898
After her cat license was revoked, Kitty must take a class and pass a test to get it back.
15	Bad Kitty Camp Daze	January 2, 2018	Chapter book	160pp	978-1626728851
After developing amnesia and starting to think she's a dog, Kitty stresses out Puppy, sending him to Uncle Murray’s camp for stressed-out dogs... But Kitty sneaks along, and various mishaps ensue.
16	Bad Kitty Kitten Trouble	December 31, 2018	Chapter book	160pp	978-1250182081
Kitty's owners bring in a number of little kittens to foster.
17	Bad Kitty Joins the Team	January 7, 2020	Chapter book	160pp	978-1250208071
Kitty exercises to get in shape.
18	Bad Kitty Goes On Vacation	December 29, 2020	Graphic novel	160pp	978-1-250-20808-8
Kitty goes to Love Love Angel Kitty World with Uncle Murray.
19	Bad Kitty Gets a Phone	December 28, 2021	Graphic novel	144pp	978-1-250-74996-3
Kitty wants a cell phone.
20	Bad Kitty: Supercat	December 27, 2022	Graphic novel	176pp	9781546177937
Kitty pretends to be a superhero.
21	Bad Kitty: Makes a Movie	December 26, 2023	Graphic novel	176pp	9781250884787
Bad Kitty achieves stardom -- and of course, a bit of trouble
22	Bad Kitty: Party Animal	January 14, 2025	Graphic novel	192pp	9781250884794
Kitty celebrates Puppy's birthday
23	Bad Kitty: Gets a Job	May 5, 2026	Graphic novel	160pp	9781250385451
Kitty must get a job to buy a new video game
24	Bad Kitty: Saves the Library	May 4, 2027	Graphic novel	176pp	9781250385468
Celebrate the library with Kitty and her friends

== Reception ==
The series was met with mostly positive reviews. Lynn Beckwith at Bookpage.com describes Kitty as "a joyfully silly portrait of a picky eater with attitude", and that Bruel's illustrations are bold and humorous. The series also won a Wyoming Buckaroo Book Award.

In 2020, the Bad Kitty series was named the 37th most banned and challenged book in the United States between 2010 and 2019, according to the American Library Association. Bad Kitty for President, in particular, attracted controversy for its usage of a grawlix as a stand-in for swear words.

== In popular culture ==
In 2015, American playwright Min Kahng wrote Bad Kitty On Stage!, a play for young audiences, which has been produced by several professional companies in California and Oregon.

In 2022, Boat Rocker Media announced that they were developing a TV series of the Bad Kitty books.
