= Erin E. Stead =

American children's book illustrator (born 1982)

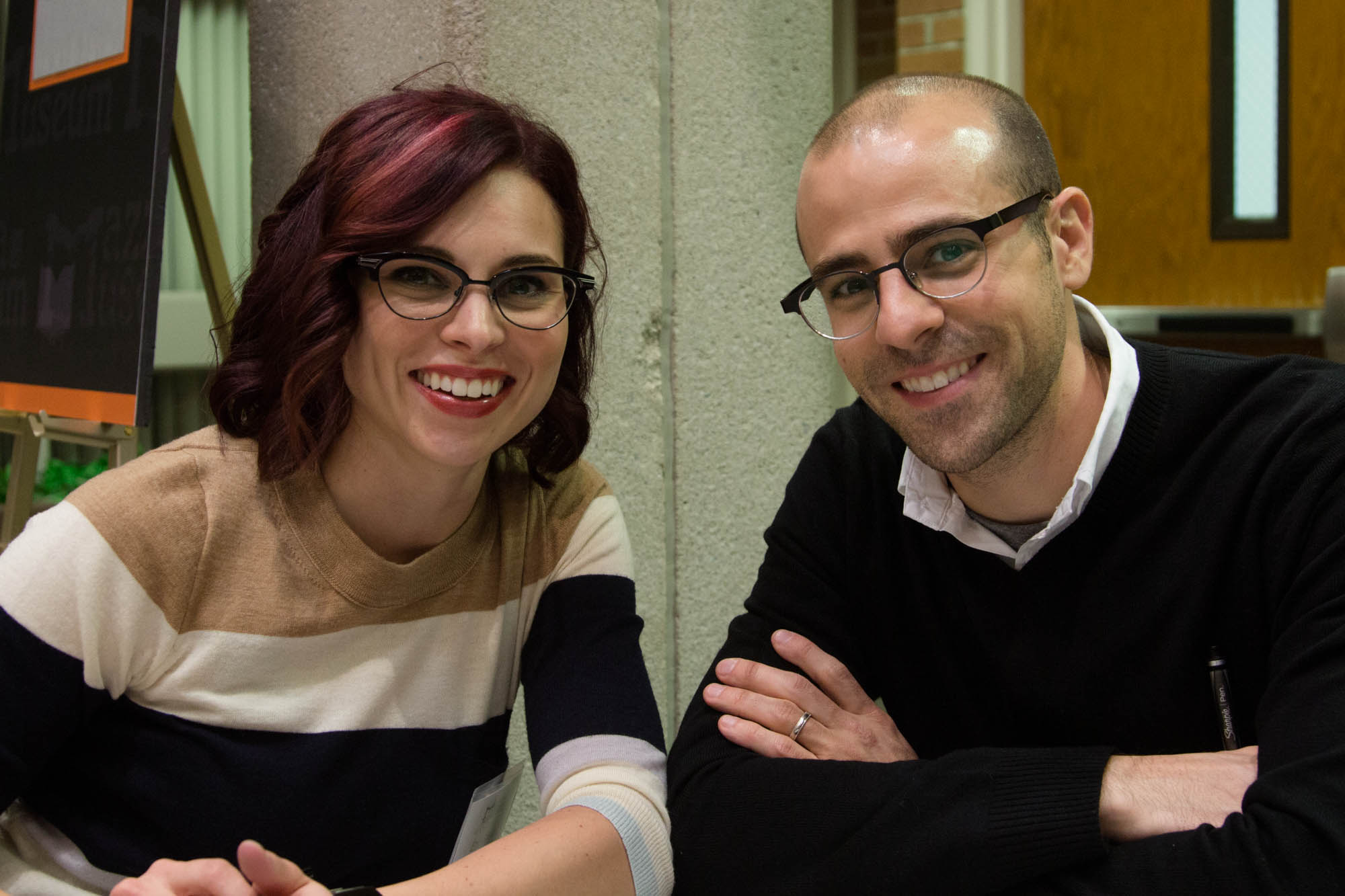
- Erin and Philip Stead at the Mazza Museum Fall Conference 2012
- Born: December 27, 1982 (age 43); Farmington Hills, Michigan
- Occupation: Illustrator
- Spouse: Philip C. Stead
- Writing career
- Period: 2010–present
- Genre: Children's picture books
- Notable work: A Sick Day for Amos McGee
- Notable awards: Caldecott Medal; 2011

Erin E. Stead (born December 27, 1982) is an American illustrator of children's books. She won the 2011 Caldecott Medal for the year's best-illustrated U.S. picture book, recognizing her first publication, A Sick Day for Amos McGee.

== Biography ==
Stead was born in Farmington Hills, Michigan, and met her husband, Philip Christian Stead in art class at Divine Child High School in Dearborn, Michigan. They married in September 2005 and moved to New York City, where he worked at the Brooklyn Children's Museum. She worked at Books of Wonder bookstore and as an assistant to the creative director at HarperCollins Children's Books. After moving back to Ann Arbor they collaborated on A Sick Day for Amos McGee, about the day a zookeeper stays home because he is sick. It was his second book (Note: Sick Day was Philip Stead's second published book, one year after a picture book that he wrote and illustrated, Creamed Tuna Fish & Peas on Toast (Roaring Brook, 2009; ISBN 9781596434011). As of February 2013, the Library of Congress Online Catalog credits him with three picture books written and illustrated, and a fourth expected in September, beside the two husband-and-wife collaborations. See External links, below, for current catalog records.) and her first. Philip wrote characters he felt would work for Erin to illustrate. She used wood blocks for color work and pencil lines for detailing. Amos McGee was edited by Neal Porter at Roaring Brooks Press and named one of the "10 Best Illustrated Children's Books" for 2010 by The New York Times.

Stead's second book, And Then It's Spring, written by Julie Fogliano (Neal Porter, 2012), 2012 Boston Globe–Horn Book Award Picture Book Honor winner.

The Steads live in Ann Arbor, Michigan, where he teaches at Washtenaw Community College.

== Works ==
Erin E. Stead has illustrated books by other writers. Most of her works are picture books published by Roaring Brook Press of New York City under the imprint Neal Porter Books. Porter had previously handled Philip Stead's debut book.

- A Sick Day for Amos McGee, by Philip C. Stead (Roaring Brook Press, 2010)
- And Then It's Spring, Julie Fogliano (2012)
- Bear Has a Story to Tell, Philip Stead (2012)
- If You Want to See a Whale, Julie Fogliano (2013; ISBN 9781596437319)
- Lenny & Lucy, by Philip C. Stead (2015; ISBN 9781596439320)
- The Uncorker of Ocean Bottles, by Michelle Cuevas (Rocky Pond Books, 2016; ISBN 9780803738683)
- The Purloining of Prince Oleomargarine, by Mark Twain and Philip Stead (Doubleday Books for Young Readers, 2017)
- Tony by Ed Galing (Roaring Brook Press, 2017; ISBN 9781626723085)
- Music for Mr. Moon by Philip Stead (Holiday House, 2019; ISBN 9780823441600)
- Amos McGee Misses the Bus (2021; ISBN 9781250815422 )
- The Sun Is Late and So Is The Farmer by Philip C. Stead (Neal Porter Books, 2022; ISBN 9780803738683)
- The Velveteen Rabbit by Margery Williams (Doubleday Books for Young Readers, 2022; ISBN 9780593382103)
- Big Bear and Little Bear Go Fishing by Amy Hest (Neal Porter Books, 2024; ISBN 9780823449750)
- A Snow Day for Amos McGee by Philip C. Stead (Roaring Brook Press, 2025; ISBN 9781250324733)
