= Divine Child High School =

Private School in Dearborn, Michigan, United States

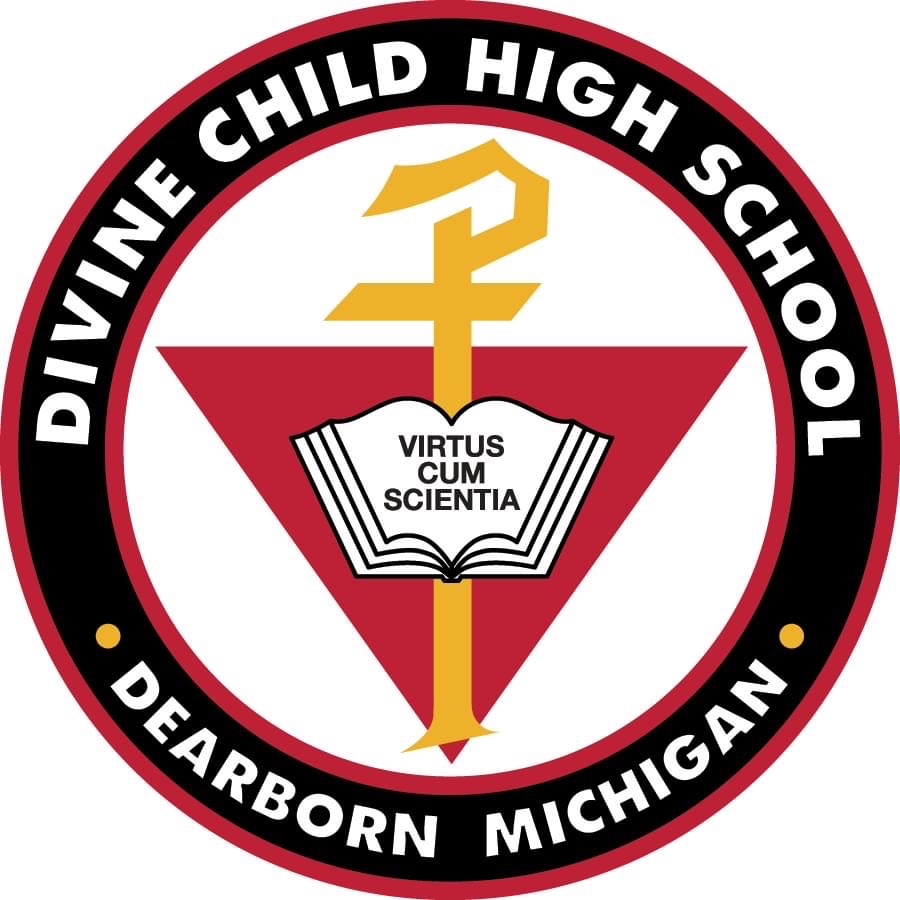

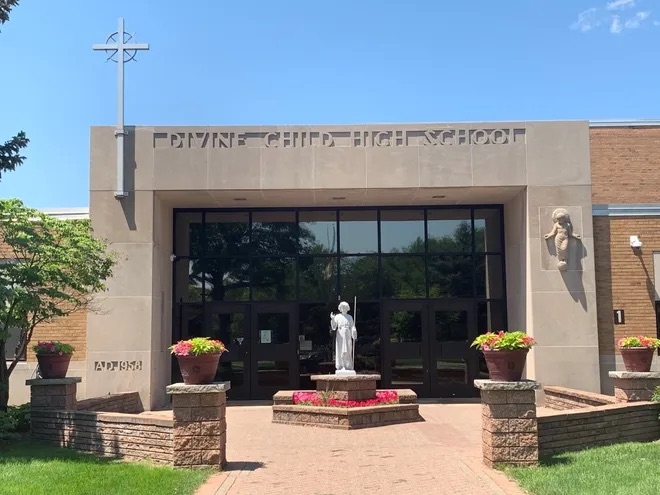
- Divine Child High School

Location
- 1001 North Silvery Lane; Dearborn, Michigan 48128; United States; 42°19′7.3″N 83°16′58″W

Information
- Type: Private school, Roman Catholic, Coeducational, College-Preparatory
- Motto: Latin: Virtus Cum Scientia (English: Virtue With Knowledge)
- Religious affiliations: Roman Catholic; Bernardine Sisters of St. Francis (Historic).
- Established: 1958
- Status: Open
- Principal: Anthony Trudel
- Teaching staff: 65.0 (on a FTE basis)
- Grades: 9–12
- Enrollment: 884 (2019-2020)
- Student to teacher ratio: 12:1
- Campus size: 20 acres (8.1 ha)
- Campus type: Suburban
- Colors: Red and black
- Athletics conference: Catholic High School League; MHSAA Catholic League Division I
- Mascot: Freddy Falcon
- Nickname: Falcons
- Rival: Cranbrook Schools; University of Detroit Jesuit High School and Academy; Father Gabriel Richard High School
- Accreditation: AdvancED
- Publication: Once A Falcon Magazines
- Yearbook: Clarion
- Tuition: $12,630 USD
- Website: www.divinechildhighschool.org

Divine Child High School, commonly known as Divine Child (DC), is a private, Roman Catholic, college-preparatory, parochial high school in Dearborn, Michigan, United States. Divine Child is a highly ranked private high school in Michigan, scoring in the top 15 percent of private schools in the State. Notably, it is the seventh-largest private high school, and the largest co-educational Catholic high school in the State.

The school is located on a 20-acre campus that includes a new athletic complex and fitness center, which was financed through an ongoing capital campaign that has raised five million in capital to date.

== Overview ==
Divine Child High School is a highly rated, Catholic, college-preparatory high school located in Dearborn, Michigan. Divine Child is ranked among the top 15% of private high schools in the State of Michigan as of the 2021–2022 school year. It is the State's largest Catholic co-ed high school, enrolling nearly 900 students from 55 different zip codes; minority enrollment at the school is 18.6 percent, and the student-teacher ratio is 12:1.

Divine Child Catholic Schools, with a total enrollment of approximately 1,500 students across grades K-12, ranks as the second largest private school community in the State.

The school follows an all school uniform policy, with boys wearing khaki slacks and an Oxford shirt and tie, and girls may either wear a kilt or slacks, along with a button-up shirt, with both wearing blazers. As of 2022, Divine Child Catholic Schools had an estimated financial endowment of twelve million dollars.

== History ==
Divine Child High School was founded in September 1958 by Monsignor Herbert Weier. Initially, it consisted of 84 freshmen, two Bernardine Sisters of St. Francis, and an athletic department. The Class of 1962, the first graduating class, consisted of 69 students. The original building consisted of 37,478 square feet (3,481.8 m^{2}) of space including ten classrooms, two science labs, a small library, a typing and office machines room, and a study hall room. Since then, eleven additions have significantly increased the size and facilities of the school.

== Demographics ==
The demographic breakdown of the 884 students enrolled at Divine Child in 2018 was: Native American/Alaskan - 1.0%; Asian/Pacific islanders - 4.8%; Black - 2.3%; Hispanic - 4.3%; White - 81.4%; Multiracial - 6.2%

== Academics ==
Divine Child offers 20 honors and 19 Advanced Placement courses that can be taken for college credit that include: American Government, American History, Art History, Calculus AB, Chemistry, Computer Science, Computer Science Principles, English Language & Composition, English Literature & Composition, Environmental Science, Spanish, Latin, Music Theory, Physics 1, Physics 2, Statistics, World History, Seminar, and Research.

The school provides academic support to students with specific learning differences at tiered levels of intervention.

== Bands ==
The school has four bands which are present: marching band, pep band, symphonic band, and jazz band.

== Athletics ==
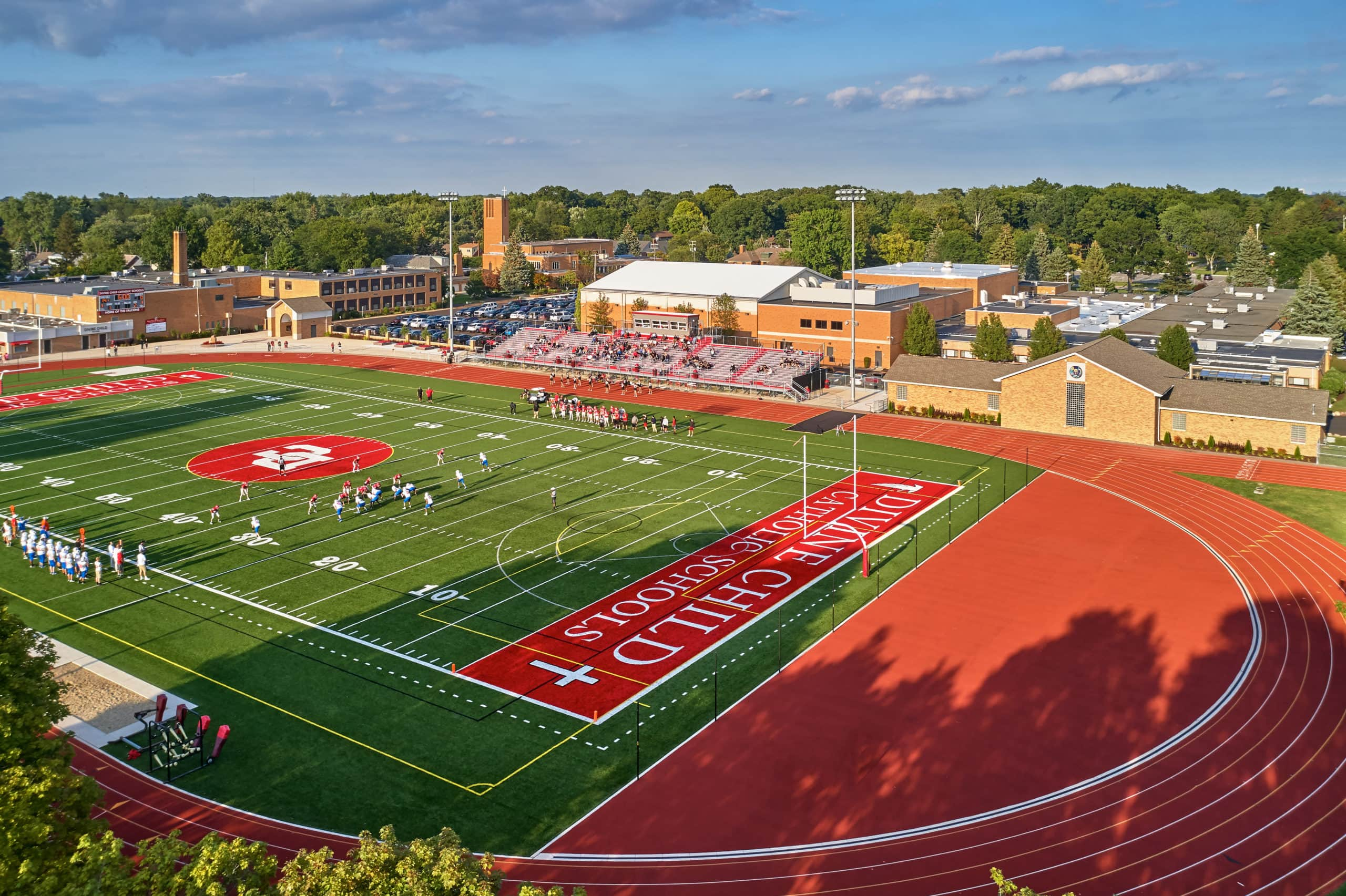
Football field

The Divine Child Falcons are members of the Catholic High School League, and has the largest athletic program in the league with over fifty teams. Divine Child is ranked among the top five percent of high schools in the United States for athletics. The school colors are red and grey. The following MHSAA sanctioned sports are offered:

- Baseball (boys)
  - State champions - 1992, 2004, 2005, 2008, 2010
- Basketball (girls and boys)
  - Boys state champions - 1973, 1977
  - Girls state champions - 1986, 1989, 1993, 1994, 2011
- Bowling (girls and boys)
  - Boys State Champions 2021
- Competitive cheer (girls)
  - State championships - 2021, 2022
- Cross country (girls and boys)
- Football (boys)
  - State championships - 1975, 1985, 2025
- Golf (girls and boys)
- Ice hockey (boys)
  - State champions - 2002
- Lacrosse (girls and boys)
- Soccer (girls and boys)
- Softball (girls)
  - State champions - 1975
- Swimming and diving (girls)
- Tennis (girls and boys)
- Track and field (girls and boys)
  - Girls state champions - 2010, 2012, 2013
- Volleyball (girls)
- Wrestling (boys)

== Notable alumni ==
- Ryan Anderson, former professional baseball pitcher and the 19th overall selection in the 1997 Major League Baseball draft
- Claire-Marie Brisson, preceptor in French at Harvard University and member of the Divine Child class of 2009
- Mike Cervenak, former Major League Baseball infielder
- Jeff Chadwick, former National Football League wide receiver
- Gary Danielson, former NFL quarterback and college-football broadcaster
- Theo Day, former college football quarterback for Michigan State and Northern Iowa
- Tom Dohring, former NFL offensive tackle
- James Finn Garner, author and satirist best known for the New York Times bestseller Politically Correct Bedtime Stories
- Dan Gheesling, reality-television and online personality; winner of Big Brother 10 and runner-up on Big Brother 14
- Eric Haase, Major League Baseball catcher
- Jim Herrmann, professional and college football coach
- Aidan Hutchinson, NFL defensive end for the Detroit Lions
- Jordan Oesterle, professional ice-hockey defenseman
- David A. Plawecki, former member and majority floor leader of the Michigan Senate
- Lauren Plawecki, former member of the Michigan House of Representatives
- Laurie Pohutsky, former speaker pro tempore of the Michigan House of Representatives
- Chris Rusin, former Major League Baseball pitcher
- Pat Shurmur, football coach and former NFL head coach
- Erin E. Stead, children's-book illustrator and recipient of the Caldecott Medal for A Sick Day for Amos McGee
- Philip C. Stead (class of 1999), children's-book author and illustrator who wrote the Caldecott Medal-winning A Sick Day for Amos McGee
- Ron Vanderlinden, former head football coach at the University of Maryland and former assistant coach at the Air Force Academy
- Brian K. Zahra, associate justice of the Michigan Supreme Court

== Notable faculty and staff ==
- Bob LaPointe, football coach at Divine Child from 1971 to 1977, including head coach of its undefeated 1975 state-championship team
- Bill McCartney, college football coach and founder of Promise Keepers who coached basketball and football at Divine Child
