= Books of Wonder =

Independent bookstore based in Manhattan

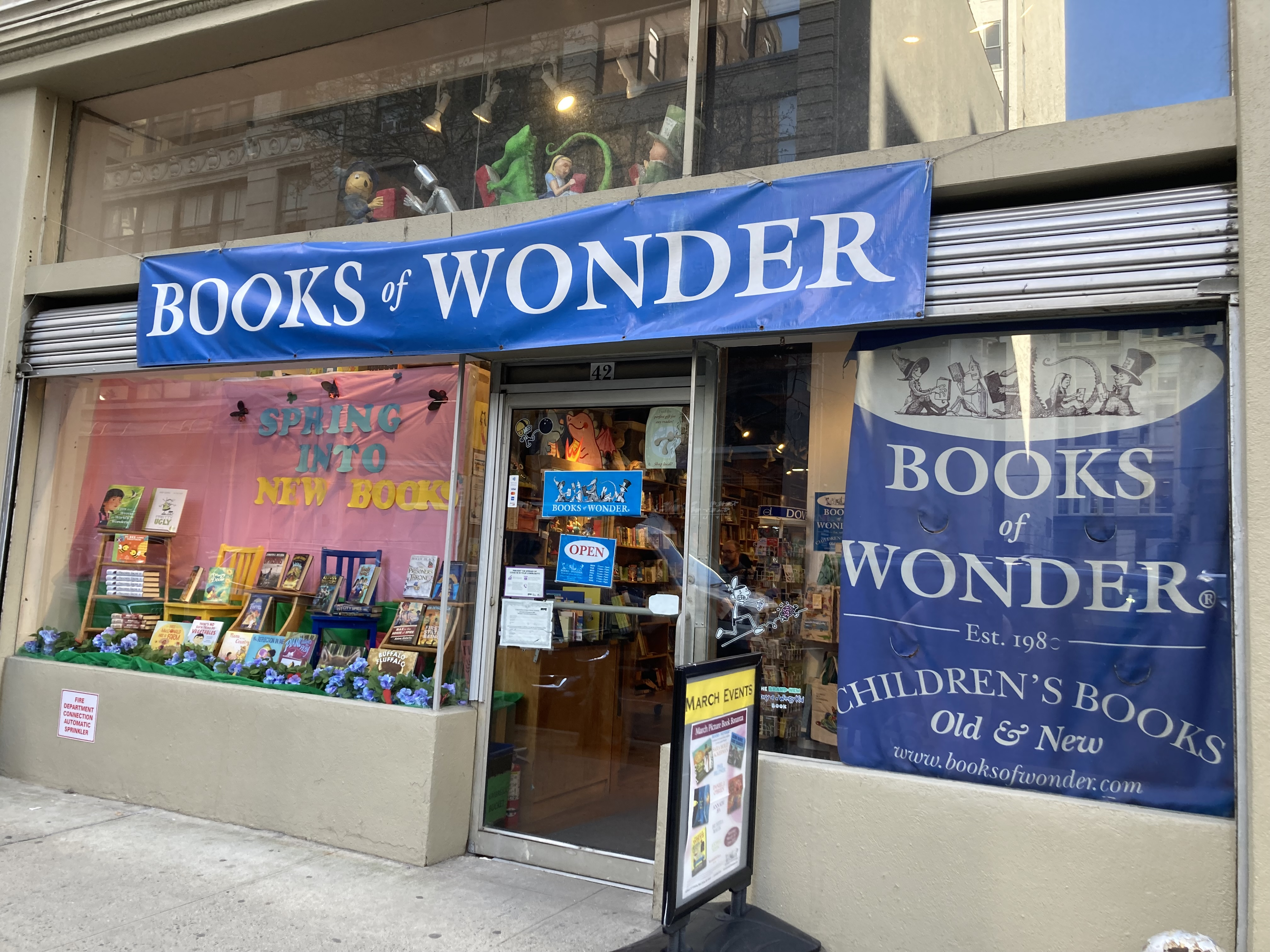
The front of the Books of Wonder bookstore

Books of Wonder is an independent bookstore and publisher based in Manhattan. It was established in 1980 by Peter Glassman and James Carey and is focused on selling antique, classic and new children's books. It has been called "New York City's oldest children's-only bookstore" still in activity.

== History ==
The first Books of Wonder store was established in 1980 on Hudson Street in Greenwich Village. Peter Glassman, who had recently dropped out from Brown University, wanted a place to sell his antique children's books to collectors. After Carey and Glassman finished setting up the bookshelves and placing the items, the couple realized they still had plenty of space left and decided to sell classic and new children's books in addition to Glassman's books. During its first year open, the store made around US$78,000 and saw enough success that they decided to move from its 150 square feet to a larger location in 1982. The location on Hudson Street factored into the store's early success, as it was close to a number of schools and was used frequently by New Jersey commuters.

=== Book publishing ===
Two years later, in 1984, at an American Bookseller Association conference, Glassman and Carey met with David Reuther, then editor-in-chief of Morrow Junior Books. There, Glassman discussed with Reuther his idea to reissue all the Oz books originally written by L. Frank Baum, which would also include the original illustrations in full color. As this aligned with Reuther's plan on reissuing classic children's books, and due to low costs because of expired copyrights, he agreed to help, and in the next year they started an imprint under William Morrow and Company.

The imprint, initially called Books of Wonder Classics, grew as they began to hire artists to illustrate and color classic children's books that lacked illustrations, which included A Connecticut Yankee in King Arthur's Court. In 1988, Books of Wonder also opened a small press, called Emerald City Press, and began publishing its own books at the store and via mail order.

=== Other stores ===
Books of Wonder first expanded in 1986, when a new, larger store was opened on Seventh Avenue in Chelsea. In 1991, a branch of the store opened in Beverly Hills, California, funded in part by Cheers co-creators Les Charles and James Burrows. It included an art gallery, directed by Michael Cart, where customers could buy original pictures by children's books illustrators.

By 1993, both the Hudson Street and Beverly Hills locations were struggling. Road repairs in Greenwich Village had hurt foot and vehicle traffic to the former, and the California location was affected by the 1992 Los Angeles riots, flooding, and an earthquake. The Hudson Street store closed in 1993, and the Beverly Hills location closed in 1994.

In June 2017, Glassman announced that he would be opening a new Books of Wonder at Upper West Side, mentioning having a second place would be beneficial in case he was unable to renew the lease of the Chelsea store, which was ending soon. The location, which had 2,600 square feet, was formerly a Gymboree, which factored in Glassman's decision, due to the need of "a doorway wide enough to accommodate double strollers". Glassman also spoke about the demographics of the region, which he saw as "the most family friendly neighborhood in the city".

The new store opened in September 2017, but was temporarily closed between March and July 2020 due to the COVID-19 pandemic. The Upper West Side store reopened on August of the same year, but had to close in 2021, when the building where the store was located changed owners.

== Notable employees ==
Various children's books authors and illustrators started as sellers at Books of Wonder before having their books published. Among those are Nick Bruel, Jason Chin, Julie Fogliano, Jenny Han and George O'Connor. Editor Neal Porter called this group of authors the "Books of Wonder mafia".
