= Min Kahng =

American playwright, composer, and lyricist

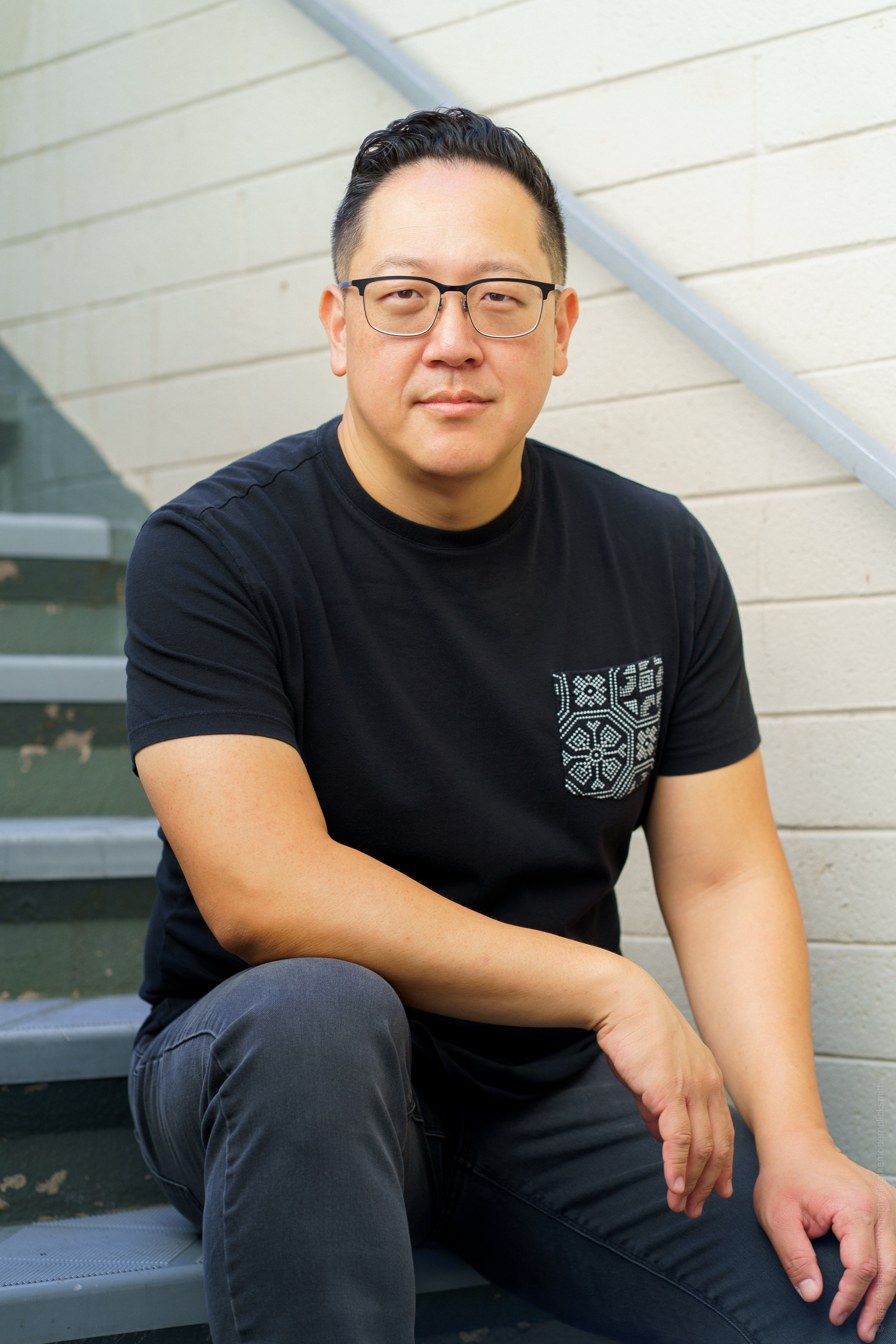
- Occupations: Playwright, composer, lyricist
- Notable work: The Four Immigrants: An American Musical Manga; Happy Pleasant Valley

Min Kahng is an American playwright, composer, lyricist, and musical theater creator. He is known for writing the book, music, and lyrics for his works, including The Four Immigrants: An American Musical Manga and Happy Pleasant Valley: A Senior Sex Scandal Murder Mystery Musical. Kahng’s musicals for adults and for children's theatre often blend humor, character‑driven storytelling, and underrepresented perspectives, and have been developed and premiered widely in the San Francisco Bay Area.

== Career ==
Kahng grew up with a deep love of musical theater and has cited Alan Menken and Stephen Sondheim as major influences on his artistic development.

=== Early work ===
Kahng first gained significant recognition with The Four Immigrants: An American Musical Manga, which premiered to positive reviews at TheatreWorks Silicon Valley in 2017.

=== Happy Pleasant Valley ===
Kahng developed the unconventional Happy Pleasant Valley: A Senior Sex Scandal Murder Mystery Musical between 2019 and 2023, and its premiere was March 5–30, 2025 at the Lucie Stern Theatre in Palo Alto, followed by a June 1–29, 2025 run at the Lesher Center for the Arts in Walnut Creek.

== Children's theater ==
Min Kahng has created seven full-length musicals for young audiences, both original and adaptations of existing material, as well as several plays for young audiences. He has created one musical play that especially caters to children with special needs.

== Style and themes ==
Kahng’s work often blends humor with heartfelt storytelling. He aims to write melodies that audiences remember while ensuring lyrics remain deeply tied to character and narrative. He has described his goal as combining Menken‑style melodic hooks with Sondheim‑like integration of music and story.

His shows frequently explore underrepresented perspectives, whether through immigrant narratives or, in Happy Pleasant Valley, the lives and sexuality of older adults. Kahng has said that while he did not initially set out to write specifically for older actors, the premise naturally aligned with his interest in representation.

== Selected Works ==
=== Musicals ===
- The Song of the Nightingale (2011)
- Where the Mountain Meets the Moon, a musical adaptation (2014)
- The Four Immigrants: An American Musical Manga (2017)
- Happy Pleasant Valley: A Senior Sex Scandal Murder Mystery Musical (2023)

=== Theatre for Young Audiences ===
==== Plays ====
- Bad Kitty On Stage! (2016)

==== Musicals ====
- Construction Site on Christmas Night (2017), with Austin Zumbro (adaptation, lyricist) and Daniel Mertzlufft (composer)
- The Adventures of Honey and Leon the Musical

== Awards and recognition ==
- TheatreWorks Silicon Valley New Works Festival selection (2023)
- Commissioned artist, TheatreWorks Silicon Valley
- Regional awards for The Four Immigrants
