= Theo Day =

American football player (born 2000)

No. 12
- Position: Quarterback

Personal information
- Born: July 20, 2000 (age 26); Canton, Michigan
- Listed height: 6 ft 5 in (1.96 m)
- Listed weight: 231 lb (105 kg)

Career information
- High school: Divine Child (Dearborn, Michigan)
- College: Michigan State (2018–2020); Northern Iowa (2021–2023)

Awards and highlights
- First-team All-MVFC (2022)
- Stats at ESPN

Theo Day (born July 20, 2000) is an American football quarterback. He played college football for the Michigan State Spartans and Northern Iowa Panthers.

== Early life ==
Day grew up in Canton, Michigan and attended Divine Child High School. As a senior he completed 120-of-203 passes for 1,622 yards and 16 touchdowns and also rushed for 878 yards and 13 touchdowns. Day was rated a three-star recruit and committed to play college football at Michigan State over offers from Minnesota, Missouri, Kentucky, and Boston College.

== College career ==
Day began his college career at Michigan State and joined the team as an early enrollee in January 2018. He redshirted his true freshman season. Day played in two games as a redshirt freshman with his most significant playing time coming in a 28-7 loss to Penn State, where he completed 2-of-3 pass attempts for 12 yards but was benched after calling the wrong play in the huddle. He competed for the Spartans' starting quarterback job against Rocky Lombardi and Payton Thorne entering the 2020 season, but ultimately was listed as the third-string prior to the season-opener. Day did not play in any games during the season, which was shortened and did not count towards his eligibility due to the COVID-19 pandemic. Following the end of the season Day entered the NCAA transfer portal.

Day ultimately transferred to Northern Iowa. He became the Panthers' starting quarterback in his first season with the team and was named to the Missouri Valley Football Conference (MVFC) All-Newcomer team after passing for 2,316 yards with 16 touchdowns and 11 interceptions. Day was named first team All-MVFC in 2022 after completing 210 of 323 pass attempts for 3,121 yards with 26 touchdowns and six interceptions and four rushing touchdowns.

== Professional career ==
Pre-draft measurables
Height	Weight	Arm length	Hand span	40-yard dash	10-yard split	20-yard split	20-yard shuttle	Three-cone drill	Vertical jump	Broad jump
6 ft 5 1/2 in (1.97 m)	224 lb (102 kg)	33 in (0.84 m)	10 in (0.25 m)	4.81 s	1.72 s	2.76 s	4.53 s	7.25 s	35.0 in (0.89 m)	9 ft 5 in (2.87 m)
All values from Pro Day
