= A Sick Day for Amos McGee =

Book by Erin E. Stead

- Cover
- Author: Philip C. Stead
- Illustrator: Erin E. Stead
- Language: English
- Published: May 25, 2010 Roaring Brook Press
- Media type: Print (Hardcover)
- Pages: 32
- ISBN: 978-1-59643-402-8
- OCLC: 466344397

A Sick Day for Amos McGee is a 2010 children's picture book written by Philip C. Stead and was illustrated by Erin E. Stead. The book, published by Roaring Brook Press, depicts a zookeeper who has bonded with the animals he cares for and who come and visit him one day when he gets sick. Phillip Stead wrote the book hoping his wife Erin would illustrate it after a period where she had become discouraged with her art. The book was well reviewed, and Erin won the 2011 Caldecott Medal for her illustrations. The book received praise for its woodblock illustrations and for its message about what friends will do to help and support each other.

== Background and publication ==
Phillip, who goes by Phil, wrote the text specifically for his wife to illustrate after finding an illustration of an elephant she had done. Erin had become discouraged with her work and had quit drawing for three years. Phil, along with the book's future editor Neal Porter, took Erin to dinner to ask her to illustrate the book. After they began working on the book, it took Erin a year to create the pictures for the book, which was the first book she had illustrated. The couple worked together to decide on the pacing of the book and where text could be supplanted by illustrations. Before its release the couple and Porter had low expectations for the book given its "quiet" nature.

The book was released on May 25, 2010. After an initial print run of only a few thousand copies, the book would later have over 300,000 copies printed and be translated into multiple languages. Two audio books, a 2012 version narrated by David de Vries, released by Weston Woods Studios, Inc. and directed by Ed Mironuk and Kris Tercek and a 2017 version narrated by Jim Dale, were released.

== Plot ==
Amos McGee is a punctual man who goes about his day the same way every day. He swings his legs out of bed, puts on a fresh uniform and hops on the #5 bus at 6:00 AM to go to the zoo. While at the City Zoo, Amos always makes time to visit his good friends and always gives them exactly what they need. He follows a reliable agenda of activities with each of his favorite animals: the elephant, the tortoise, the penguin, the rhinoceros and the owl. Amos plays chess with the elephant, who thinks long and hard before each move, races the tortoise and lets him win, sits quietly with the very shy penguin, lends a handkerchief to the runny-nosed rhinoceros, and at dusk reads to the owl, who is scared of the dark. One day, however, Amos wakes up with a terrible cold. He decides that he won't make it to work. Because Amos is a reliable friend, his dear friends start to wonder where he is. Getting worried, the animals leave the zoo and hop onto the #5 bus to Amos' house. To comfort Amos, each animal stretches beyond his or her fears to help a friend recover. Afterwards, they all go to sleep, as they have a morning bus to catch that takes them back to the zoo.

== Writing and illustrations ==
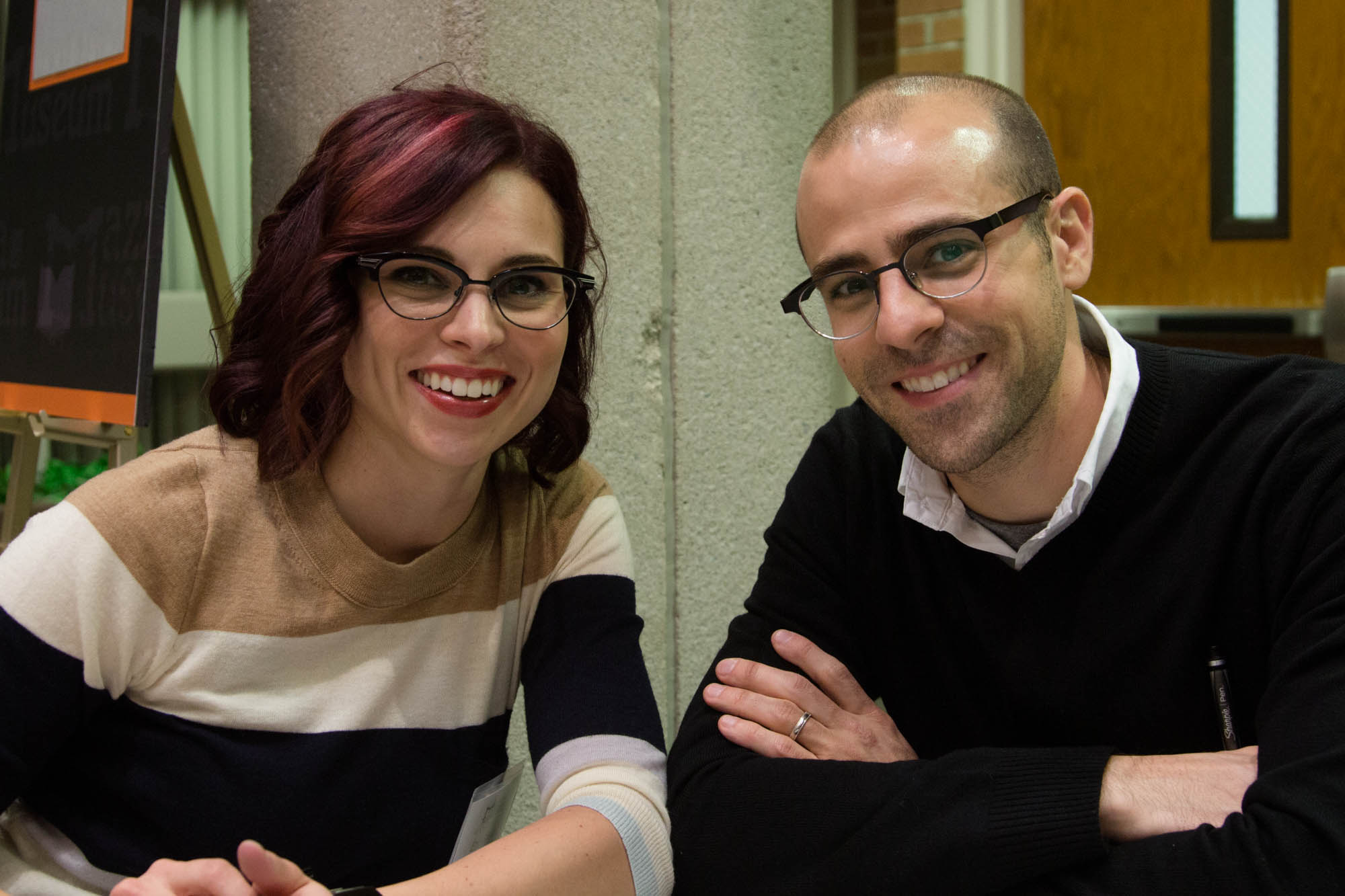
Illustrator Erin Stead and her husband author Phillip Stead.

The book has a timeless quality, giving no real indication of the era in which it was created. A Sick Day for Amos McGee is about what friends will do to help each other. Erin's illustrations contain hidden details for the reader to find and which help give the animals and Amos character. These detailed but still subtle illustrations help to contribute to the book's overall feel for the reader. She created her illustrations using woodblock technique and pencils, primarily using muted colors with yellows and red added for contrast. The Horn Book Magazine reviewer Kitty Flynn called the illustrations well drawn to complement the "gentle text". Several reviewers gave particular praise to the book's final pages.

== Reception and awards ==
The book earned starred reviews from Kirkus Reviews and Publishers Weekly, who also named it a best book of the year. Lisa Von Drasek of Bank Street College of Education praised the book in The New York Times for "delightfully tak[ing] its loony scenario for granted." The Times also named it one of the best illustrated children's books of 2010. Paula Duffy Swan in Library Media Connection gave it a more mixed review, rating it an "additional selection" and summarizing the book as "a sweet, but simple story".

Erin won the 2011 Caldecott Medal for her illustrations. Caldecott committee chair Judy Zuckerman praised the book, writing, "Endearing, expressive characterization in spare illustrations rendered in muted tones distinguish this timeless picture book." When Erin received the phone call about the win, she worried her reaction – which was to become shaky and have a need to sit down – was a disappointment to the committee. She later reflected on how important it was to have won the award for a book she created with her husband.

Awards
Preceded by The Lion & the Mouse	Caldecott Medal recipient 2011	Succeeded by A Ball for Daisy
