= Wyoming Library Association =

Professional association for librarians in Wyoming

- Nickname: WLA
- Formation: October 7, 1914; 111 years ago
- Founder: Agnes Snow
- Founded at: Laramie, Wyoming
- Tax ID no.: 83-0232285
- Headquarters: Cheyenne, Wyoming
- Parent organization: American Library Association

The Wyoming Library Association (WLA) is a professional organization for Wyoming's librarians and library workers headquartered in Cheyenne, Wyoming. The idea of a state library association was first proposed by Agnes Snow, the chairman of the Wyoming State Federation of Women's Clubs’ Literacy and Library Extension Committee. The library association, originally called WSLA, held its first meeting on October 6, 1914, in Laramie and elected Dr. Grace Raymond Hebard, the University of Wyoming's first librarian, as president with Snow as vice president. Chalmers Hadley from the American Library Association gave an opening speech discussing "the workings of a state library association" and explaining the benefits of such an organization.

WLA produced a newsletter called the Wyoming Library Roundup from 1943 to 1990 and now produces the Wyoming Library Association Newsletter.

== See also ==
- List of libraries in the United States
