= Neal Porter =

American children's book editor

Neal Porter is an American children's book editor. He is the founder of Neal Porter Books, an imprint of Holiday House.

After a brief stint in the college textbook department of St. Martin's Press he moved into trade publishing, in 1977, where he held marketing positions at Avon Books, Farrar, Straus and Giroux, Atheneum and Scribners. In 1985 he became Editorial Director of Aladdin Books at Macmillan, and in 1987 he moved to London to become Joint Managing Director of Walker Books in London. He returned to the United States in 1989 as Vice President and Publisher of Macmillan Children's Books and subsequently held executive positions at Orchard Books and Dorling Kindersley (DK). In 2000 he decided to step away from administration and focus exclusively on editing books. In 2002 at Holtzbrinck, he helped to found Roaring Brook Press, where he was Editorial Director of Neal Porter Books, and a leading voice in children's publishing. In 2017, he moved the imprint to Holiday House.

In 2025, Porter retired from publishing, with Taylor Norman taking over as Editorial Director of the imprint.

Authors and illustrators he has worked with include Laura Vaccaro Seeger, Philip and Erin Stead, Mark Shulman, Nick Bruel, Yuyi Morales, Jason Chin, Antoinette Portis, Sandra Jordan, Betsy and Ted Lewin, Wendell Minor, and Matt Davies.

Books he has edited have received many awards and honors, including the Caldecott Medal, four Caldecott honor medals, two Theodore Geisel Honors, two Sibert Honors, the Boston Globe–Horn Book Award, three Pura Belpré Awards, the Coretta Scott King Award, two Orbis Pictus Awards, the Ezra Jack Keats Award, an ALA Best Fiction citation, and numerous other ALA Notable Books citations.

In September 2015, he received a prestigious Carle Honor for his contribution to picture books.

Neal Porter resides in New York City.
