= Nick Bruel =

American author and illustrator of children's books

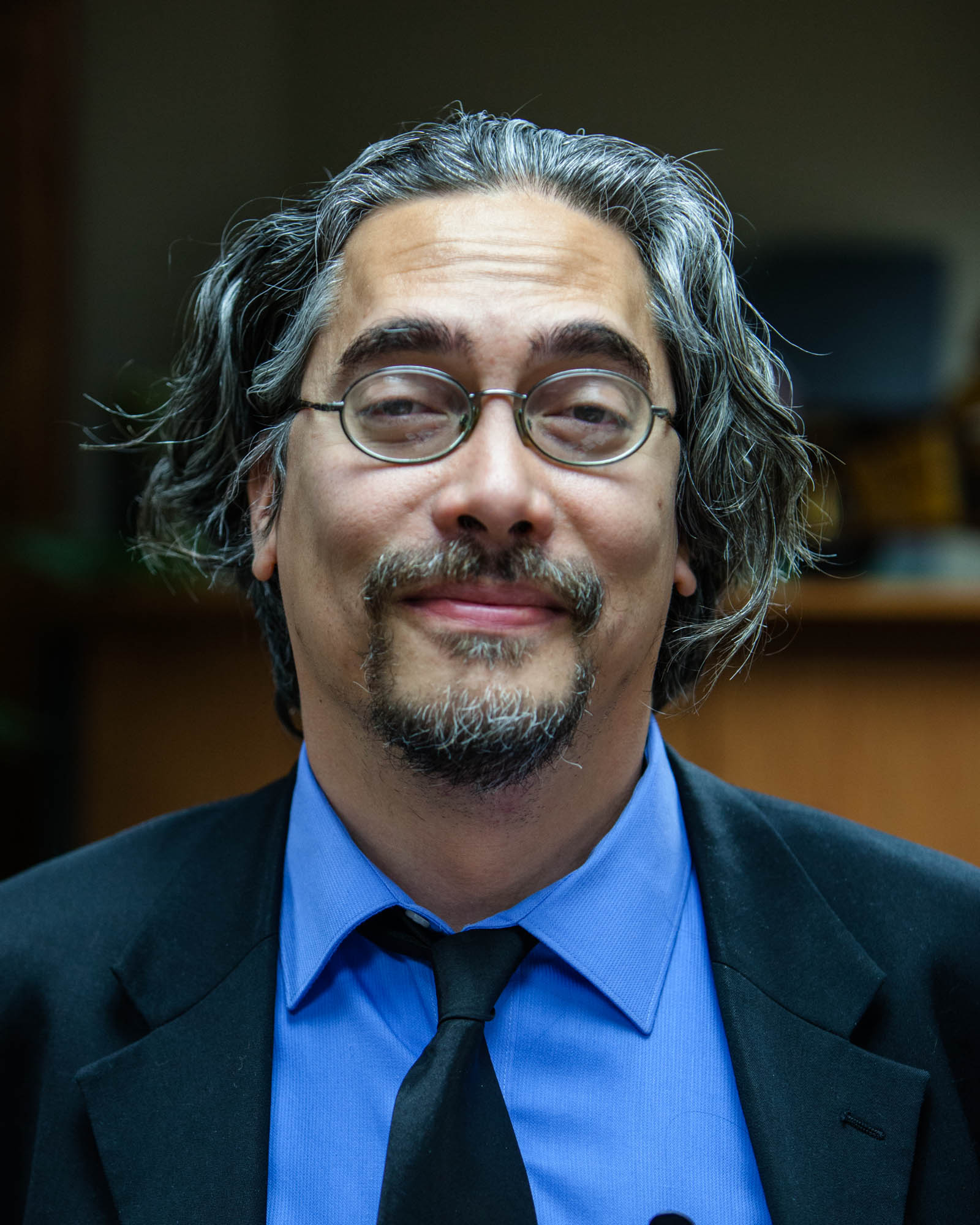
- Bruel in 2013
- Born: Nicholas Tung Ming Bruel; December 9, 1978 (age 47)
- Occupation: Author and illustrator
- Years active: 2004–present

Signature
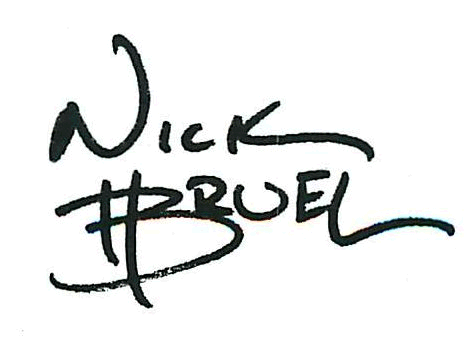

Website
- www.nickbruel.com

Nicholas Tung Ming Bruel is an American author and illustrator of children’s books, most notably the Bad Kitty series. The first book in the series, Bad Kitty, is an alphabet-themed picture book, and expanded series includes both picture books and chapter books, as well as a guide to drawing comics. His books have been New York Times bestsellers.

== Authored-illustrated works ==
- Boing!, 2004
- Who is Melvin Bubble?, 2006
- Little Red Bird, 2008
- Bad Kitty Makes Comics . . . and You Can Too!, 2015
- A Wonderful Year, 2015

Bad Kitty Picture Books

- Bad Kitty, 2005
- Poor Puppy, 2007
- A Bad Kitty Christmas, 2011
- Bad Kitty's Tasty Treats, 2014
- Bad Kitty Does Not Like Dogs, 2015
- Bad Kitty Does Not Like Candy, 2015
- Bad Kitty Scaredy-Cat, 2016
- Bad Kitty Does Not Like Snow, 2016
- Bad Kitty Does Not Like Video Games, 2019
- Bad Kitty Does Not Like Thanksgiving, 2019
- Bad Kitty: Searching for Santa, 2019
- Bedtime for Bad Kitty, 2021
- Bad Kitty Does Not Like Valentine's Day, 2022

Bad Kitty Chapter Books

- Bad Kitty Gets a Bath, 2008
- Happy Birthday, Bad Kitty, 2009
- Bad Kitty vs. Uncle Murray, 2010
- Bad Kitty Meets the Baby, 2011
- Bad Kitty for President, 2012
- Bad Kitty School Daze, 2013
- Bad Kitty Drawn to Trouble, 2014
- Bad Kitty: Puppy's Big Day, 2015
- Bad Kitty Goes to the Vet, 2016
- Bad Kitty Takes the Test, 2017
- Bad Kitty Camp Daze, 2018
- Bad Kitty: Kitten Trouble, 2018
- Bad Kitty Joins the Team, 2019
- Bad Kitty Goes on Vacation, 2020
- Bad Kitty Wants a Phone, 2021
- Bad Kitty: Supercat, 2022
- Bad Kitty Makes a Movie, 2023
- Bad Kitty: Party Animal, 2025
- Bad Kitty Gets a Job, 2026

== Awards ==
=== Bad Kitty ===
- 2007 Buckaroo Book Award—Children's (Winner)
- 2007 North Carolina Children's Book Award—Picture Book (Nominee)
- 2007 South Carolina Childrens, Junior and Young Adult Book Award—Picture Book (Nominee)
- 2007 Volunteer State Book Award—Grades K-3 (Winner)
- 2008 Colorado Children's Book Award—Picture Book (Runner-Up)
- 2008 Monarch Award—Grades K-3 (Second Place)
- 2009 Young Hoosier Book Award—Picture Book (Winner)

=== Bad Kitty Gets A Bath ===
- 2009 Gryphon Award—Children's Literature (Honor Book)
- 2011 Beverly Cleary Children's Choice Award (Winner)
- 2011 Golden Archer Award—Intermediate (Nominee)
- 2012 Nevada Young Readers' Award—Young Readers (Nominee)

=== Bad Kitty Meets The Baby ===
- 2012 Third and Fourth Grade Book of the Year—Children's Book Council

=== Bad Kitty For President ===
- 2013 Third and Fourth Grade Book of the Year—Children's Book Council

=== Bad Kitty: School Daze ===
- 2014 Colorado Children's Book Award—Junior Novel (Runner-Up)
- 2016 Monarch Award—Grades K-3 (Nominee)

=== Who Is Melvin Bubble? ===
- 2008 Black-Eyed Susan Award—Picture Book (Nominee)
- 2008 Washington Children's Choice Picture Book Award—Picture Book (Nominee)
- 2009 North Carolina Children's Book Award—Picture Book (Winner)
