= Latino poetry =

Written by poets born or living in the US who are of Latin American origin / descent

Latino poetry is a branch of American poetry written by poets born or living in the United States who are of Latin American origin or descent and whose roots are tied to the Americas and their languages, cultures, and geography.

== Languages ==
The work is most often written only in English and Spanish, with flourishes of code-switching and Spanglish. However, Latino poetry is also written in Portuguese and can include Nahuatl, Mayan, Huichol, Arawakan, and other indigenous languages related to the Latino experience. The most prominent cultural groups that write Latino poetry are Mexican-Americans and Chicanos, Puerto Ricans and Nuyoricans, Cuban-Americans, Dominican-Americans, and Central Americans.

Notable Latino poets who write in Spanish, Spanglish, and English include Miguel Algarin, Giannina Braschi, Carmen Boullosa, Ana Castillo, Sandra Cisneros, Guillermo Gómez-Peña, Pedro Pietri, Miguel Piñero, and Tato Laviera.

Notable Latino poets who write primarily in English include William Carlos Williams, Martín Espada, Sandra Maria Esteves, Cristina García, and Jimmy Santiago Baca.

== Themes and genres ==
Latino poetry explores a wide variety of personal, social justice, and historical issues, spanning themes of love, death, language, family, and history, as well as discussing real-life events like immigration restrictions, human rights, DACA, and DREAMers. Borders are a prevalent theme of Latino poetry. Their genres are widely varied, spanning epic poetry, prose poetry, narrative poetry, lyric poems, hip hop, rap, reggaeton, and experimental and bilingual formats.

== Major works ==
William Carlos Williams (whose English father was raised in the Dominican Republic, and whose his mother was from Mayagüez, Puerto Rico.) wrote the poetry epic Paterson from 1946 to 1958. He is associated with the American modernism and imagism. With the goal of expanding American audiences for literature written in Spanish, Williams and José Vázquez-Amaral translated Spanish and Latin American literature together, including Figueredo's “Naked”; Pablo Neruda’s “Ode to Laziness”; and Silvina Ocampo’s “The Infinite Horses.” Williams also translated The Dog and the Fever, a novella by Pedro Espinosa.

Among the major Latino lyric poets writing today are MacArthur Award winner Sandra Cisneros (author of the American Book Award-winning novel The House on Mango Street) and Richard Blanco, whom Barack Obama selected to write his Presidential inauguration poem. In How to Love a Country, Blanco, born of Cuban exiles, writes in a mix of English and Spanish about the trauma of immigration and exile, especially for those whose lives are entwined in DACA or who live as DREAMers.

Latino poets who use dramatic poetry in an epic work include Lin-Manuel Miranda, the creator of the Broadway musicals In the Heights (2008) and Hamilton (2015), which has rhyming couplets throughout the historical play, often multiple couplets within a single line of verse. Hamilton is widely used to teach poetry in classrooms. Another dramatic Latino poet is Giannina Braschi, who writes epic poetry that embeds dramatic, lyrical, and prose poems into lyric essays, political manifestos, and short stories. Braschi's cross-genre poetry works include Empire of Dreams (1994), the Spanglish classic Yo-Yo Boing! (1998), and the geopolitical comic-tragedy United States of Banana (2011) about the collapse of the American empire and the distribution of American passports to all Latin Americans.

Other important works of poetry on American immigration and the Mexican border include 187 Reasons Mexicanos Can’t Cross the Border: Undocuments (1971-2007) and Border-Crosser with a Lamborghini Dream (1999) by Juan Felipe Herrera.

== History ==
During the civil rights movements of the 1960s and 1970s, Latino poets, artists, and activists formed bilingual literary journals, magazines, publishing houses, and cultural centers to disseminate their poetry, honor their cultural legacies, and advance social justice for Latino communities. Until they created their own publishing venues their works were not available. Examples of Latino founded early publishing platforms include: the performance venue Nuyorican Poets Cafe (1973); magazines such as Corazon De Aztlán (1972), Revista Chicano-Riqueña (1973), and Chiricú (1976); and independent publishing house Arte Publico Press (1979), which brought bilingual authors such as Sandra Cisneros, Miguel Piñero, Pat Mora, and Nicholasa Mohr into the mainstream.

It was not until 2012 that a Latino, Juan Felipe Herrera, the son of migrant workers from Mexico, served as poet laureate of the United States. Several Latino poets have since been elected to mainstream American poetry institutions such as the Poetry Society of America (onto whose board Rigoberto Gonzalez was elected) and the Academy of American Poets (in which Alberto Rios was elected as Chancellor). However, Latino and other nonwhite poets, especially women, remain underrepresented in National Poetry Month and other mainstream American poetry organizations in the United States.

However, there are many scholarly forums for the dissemination of research and teaching methods related to Latino poetry. Since 1968, there are many institutes and programs in colleges and universities throughout the United States that teach Latino literature as a counter-narrative to classes deemed "Eurocentric." In addition, the largest language and academic literary associations feature post-graduate level panels and events on developments in Latino poetry, such as the Modern Language Association, Latin American Studies Association, American Comparative Literature Association, and the American Literature Association, among others.

== Latino poets in the United States ==
- Elizabeth Acevedo
- Julia Alvarez
- Marjorie Agosin
- Francisco X. Alarcon
- Richard Blanco
- Giannina Braschi
- Carmen Boullosa
- Ana Castillo
- Sandra Cisneros
- Cynthia Cruz
- Lorna Dee Cervantes
- Martin Espada
- Guillermo Gómez-Peña
- José B. González
- Rigoberto González
- Alberto Baltazar Urista (Alurista)
- Juan Felipe Herrera
- Ada Limon
- Carmen Maria Machado
- Lupe Mendez
- Lin-Manuel Miranda
- Urayoán Noel
- Carlos Pintado
- Jesús Papoleto Meléndez
- Ruben Quesada
- Emanuel Xavier
- Alberto Rios
- Jimmy Santiago Baca
- Gary Soto
- Virgil Suarez
- Luís Alberto Urrea
- William Carlos Williams

== See also ==
- Chicano poetry
- Caribbean poetry
- Nuyorican
- American literature in Spanish
- List of Mexican American writers
- List of Cuban American writers
- List of Puerto Rican writers
- Latino studies
