= Sandra María Esteves =

American poet

- Born: May 10. 1948; The Bronx, New York
- Occupations: Poet, visual artist
- Writing career
- Notable works: Yerba Buena, Tropical Rain, Bluestown Mockingbird Mambo
- Literary movement: Nuyorican
- Website: www.sandraesteves.com

Sandra María Esteves (born May 10, 1948) is a Latina poet and graphic artist. She was born and raised in the Bronx, New York, and is one of the founders of the Nuyorican poetry movement. She has published collections of poetry and has conducted literary programs at New York City Board of Education, the Caribbean Cultural Center, and El Museo del Barrio. Esteves has served as the executive director of the African Caribbean Poetry Theater. She is the author of Bluestown Mockinbird Mambo (Arte Publico Press, 1990) and Yerba Buena (Greenfield Review, 1980). She lives in the Bronx.

== Life ==
Esteves was born in the South Bronx to a Puerto Rican sailor, Charlie Esteves, and a Dominican garment worker, Christina Huyghue. Her father separated before Esteves’ birth from her mother but Esteves maintained a close connection with the Puerto Rican side of her family while her mother had broken ties to her Dominican past. Her mother was concerned early on with her upbringing in the challenging environment of their neighborhood of Hunts Point, and thus enrolled her in a primary Catholic boarding school on the Lower East Side, Holy Rosary Academy. She would later continue at St. Anselm for middle school and then graduate from Cardinal Spellman High School in the Bronx. During her early education she experienced traumatic anti-Hispanic prejudice that caused her to switch languages from Spanish to English-dominant. She experienced issues of colorism within her family. She went on her first trip at seventeen to the island of Puerto Rico to better understand herself but was left further questioning her identity.

She enrolled at the Pratt Institute in Brooklyn to pursue graphic arts, but dropped out after the first year; she later returned to complete her degree in 1978. While she did find lack of support during her initial time at Pratt, one Japanese professor who specialized in sculpture, Toshio Odate, encouraged her to look at how words could contribute to her work as a visual artist. This, along with the inspiration she found in attending the poetry readings at the National Black Theater of Harlem she would find herself becoming a founding member of, all helped her to begin to utilizing poetry as a medium to grapple with her identity crisis.

Esteves joined El Grupo, an artistic collective who performed with the intention of leading social change; this would serve as the foundation and core for the Nuyorican movement itself. As a performing poet, she read in the Nuyorican Poets Café during its first launch in 1974 under Miguel Algarín and Miguel Piñero as well as its reopening in 1988. She was also one of two featured poets on El Grupo's LP Canciones y poesía de la lucha de los pueblos latinoamericanos/ Songs and Poetry of the Latin American Struggle, released in 1974, alongside Jesús Papoleto Meléndez. Her reach was not exclusive to Loisaida, though, as she also spent several years as the executive director and producer of the African Caribbean Poetry Theater from 1983 until 1988, as well as performing with Taller Boricua, which helped cultivate a distinction within her poetry compared with her male Nuyorican counterparts. Since then she has continued her involvement in numerous community organization projects and performing workshops dedicated to youth outreach via the arts and writing, partnering with associations throughout New York City such as, but not exclusive to, the New York State Poets in the Schools Program (1981-1989), the Caribbean Cultural Center and African Diaspora Institute, the New Rican Village Cultural Center, the Cultural Council Foundation of the Artistic Project of the Comprehensive Employment and Training Act, the Teachers and Writers Collaborative, and the Bronx Music Heritage Center.

== Poetic Contributions ==
Urayoán Noel has noted that Sandra Maria Esteves' poetry is an example of “organic poetics” due to the evolutionary nature of her poetry alongside her politicized growth in conjunction with her personal growth with her identity. Her distinguishing poetic quality can be recognized through those she deemed her mentors, who include Julia de Burgos, Nicolas Guillen, and Pablo Neruda, as well as who she kept close to, which included fellow Nuyoricans Miguel Algarín and Miguel Piñero but also African-American writers Ntozake Shange and Michael Harper. The themes that she frequently addresses are identity struggles—most notably her personally comprehension of her place as an Afro-Caribbean but also as challenges to her mentors and peers (“A Julia y a Mi” for Julia de Burgos, “3:00 AM Eulogy for a Small Time Poet” presumably for Miguel Piñero), parsing out feminism within the Latino culture, oppression of women, metapoems describing poetry as a tool to instill change, motherhood and birth, and mysticism and spiritualism.

Her first poetry collection Yerba Buena: Dibujos y poemas was published in 1980 and holds the accolade of being one of the first poetry books published by a Latina in the United States. While most known for the poetry within, it also contains art she created to pair with the written words. One of the most well-known poems from the collection, “A la Mujer Borrinquena,” details the life of the character Maria Cristina who takes on the role of the Puerto Rican woman as she is idealized in one sense—dedicated to supporting her family—while maintaining awareness of her role and how despite seemingly falling in line with what is expected of her, her actions serve as a mode of protection of her family but even more so her culture. This would be challenged by Luz Maria Umpierre, who wrote “In Response” and criticized the construction of Maria Cristina's, and Esteves’, feminism by utilizing the original poem's format to construct a new female character that aggressively opposes traditional sex roles. Esteves would respond once again in her third collection, Bluestown Mockingbird Mambo, with the poem “So Your Name Isn't Maria Cristina” and uses her words to recognize the value in Umpierre's words but reaffirms the autonomy that can be found within Maria Cristina's actions as well, validating the diverse ways to work against patriarchal oppression.

Her second poetry collection, Tropical Rains: A Bilingual Downpour, was published in 1984 but did not see the wide success of Yerba Buena, potentially due to the fact that it was self-published. It is where Esteves further expounds upon her identity as an Afro-Caribbean alongside that of a Nuyorican, as well as where she begins exploring the complexities of motherhood and the maternal female figure.

Bluestown Mockingbird Mambo was published in 1990 and remains her most widely distributed collection. As the title suggests, she draws on various musical genres that have influenced and defined her identity such as blues and jazz coming from the African-American community alongside mambo, salsa, bomba, and plena from the Latino community to influence her writing here. It is also where she begins to expand beyond struggles within the Latino community and develops multicultural voices beyond her own to further elaborate on the oppressions that envelop numerous communities of women and the need for alliance formation to create widespread change.

== Works ==
Publications

- DivaNations, a cappella spoken-word audio CD (self-published, 2010).
- Wildflowers, a cappella spoken-word audio CD (self-published, 2009).
- Portal, (Limited Editions Press/self-published, 2007).
- Poems In Concert (Air Loom Publications/self-published, 2006).
- Finding Your Way, Poems for Young Folks; (No Frills Publications/self-published, 1999).
- Contrapunto In The Open Field; (No Frills Publications/self-published, 1998).
- Undelivered Love Poems; (No Frills Publications/self-published, 1997).
- Bluestown Mockingbird Mambo; (Arte Público Press/University of Houston, 1990); ISBN 1-55885-017-1.
- Tropical Rain: A Bilingual Downpour; (African Caribbean Poetry Theater/self-published, 1984).
- Yerba Buena Poems & Drawings; (Greenfield Review Press, 1980); ISBN 0-912678-47-X. Selected Best Small Press, 1981 by the Library Journal.

Selected Poems in Anthologies, Literary Journals and Web sites

- Breaking Ground Anthology of Puerto Rican Women Writers In New York 1980-2012, Ed. by Myrna Nieves (Editorial Campana, 2012) ISBN 978-1-934370-16-2.
- Bullying: Replies, Rebuttals, Confessions, & Catharsis: An Intergenerational & Multicultural Anthology, Ed. by Magdalena Gomex & María Luisa Arroyo (Skyhorse Publishing, 2012) ASIN B009CROKNK.
- The Afro-Latin@ Reader, History and Culture In the United States, Ed. by Miriam Jiménez and Juan Flores (Duke University Press, 2010) ISBN 978-0-8223-4572-5.
- Let Loose On the World: Celebrating Amiri Baraka at 75 (The Amiri Baraka Commemoration Committee, 2009).
- Drumvoices Revue, Spring/Summer/Fall 2008, Vol. 16, ISSN 1080-0522, ISBN 978-1-880748-65-7.
- Puerto Rican Poetry, Ed. by Roberto Márquez (University of Massachusetts Press, 2007) ISBN 978-1-55849-562-3.
- African Voices, Fall/Winter 2007, Vol. 12, Issue 23 ISSN 1530-0668.
- Understanding the Latina/o Experience in the United States: Readings in Ethnic Studies John Jay College of Criminal Justice (Pearson Education Company, 2007).
- Latino Boom, An Anthology of U.S. Latino Literature, Ed. by John S. Christie and José B. Bonzalez (Pearson Education, Inc., 2006) ISBN 0-321-09383-6.
- Storyworks, Vol. 13 No. 2, October 2005 (Scholastic, 2005) ISSN 1068-0292.
- The Heath Anthology of American Literature, Vol E, Contemporary Period 1945 to the Present, Ed. by Paul Lauter (Houghton Mifflin Co., 2006) ISBN 0-618-53301-X.
- Red Hot Salsa, Bilingual Poems on Being Young and Latino in the United States, Ed. by Lori Marie Carlson (Henry Holt & Co., 2005) ISBN 978-0-8050-7616-5, ISBN 0-8050-7616-6.
- U.S. Latino Literature Today, Ed. by Gabriela Baeza Ventura (Pearson Education, Inc., 2005) ISBN 0-321-19843-3.
- Approaching Literature in the 21st Century, Ed. by Peter Schakel & Jack Ridl (Bedford/St. Martin's, 2005) ISBN 0-312-40756-4; ISBN 978-0-312-40756-8.
- Puerto Rican Music and Dance: RicanStructing Roots/Routes, Part II; Centro Journal Vol. XVI, No. 2 (Centro de Estudios Puertorriqueños, Hunter College/City University of New York, 2004) ISSN 1538-6279, ISBN 1-878483-73-0.
- Latino Studies Journal, Vol. 2, Issue 2, Ed. by Suzanne Oboler (Univ. of Ill. at Chicago/www.palgrave-journals.com, 2004).
- Essence Magazine Vol.35, No. 1: Mothers and Daughters May 2004.
- Riding Low on the Streets of Gold, Latino Literature for Young Adults, Ed. by Judith Ortiz Cofer (Piñata Books/Arte Público Press/University of Houston, 2003) ISBN 1-55885-380-4.
- Latino/a Literature in the English Classroom; Ed. by Manuel Hernández (Editorial Plaza Mayor; San Juan, PR, 2003) ISBN 1-56328-249-6.
- LandEscapes, Ed. by Lee M. McGuire (Washington State University, 2003).
- Almost a Woman web site for ExxonMobil Masterpiece Theater American Collection (WGBH Boston, 2002).
- Herencia: The Anthology of Hispanic Literature of the United States, Ed. by Nicolás Kanellos (Oxford University Press, Inc., 2002) ISBN 0-19-513824-4.
- The Prentice Hall Anthology of Latino Literature, Ed. by Eduardo del Rio (Prentice Hall/Pearson Education Inc., 2002) ISBN 0-13-026687-6.
- Bum Rush the Page, Ed. by Tony Medina and Louis Reyes Rivera (Three Rivers Press/Crown Publishing Group/Random House Inc., 2001) ISBN 0-609-80840-0.
- Glencoe Literature, The Reader's Choice: American Literature, (Glencoe/McGraw-Hill, 2000).
- The Floating Borderlands, Twenty-five Years of U. S. Hispanic Literature, Ed. by Lauro Flores (University of Washington Press, 1998) ISBN 0-295-97746-9.
- Hispanic American Literature, Ed. by Rodolfo Cortina (NTC Publishing Co., 1998) ISBN 0-8442-5730-3.
- Long Shot, Vol. 20, (Long Shot Productions, Inc., 1998) ISSN 0895-9773.
- El Coro, A Chorus of Latino/Latina Literature, Ed. by Martín Espada (Univ. of Massachusetts Press, 1997) ISBN 1-55849-110-4.
- Growing Up Bilingual Ed. by Ana Celia Zentella (Blackwell Pub., 1997) ISBN 1-55786-407-1.
- The Hispanic Literary Companion; Ed. by Nicolás Kanellos (Visible Ink Press, 1997) ISBN 0-7876-1014-3.
- Tiempo De Marejada, Imagen Poetica Del Siglo XX; Ed. by Manuel De La Puebla (Ediciones Mairena; San Juan, PR, 1997) ISBN 1-881708-14-4.
- In Defense of Mumia; Ed. by Sam Anderson and Tony Medina (Writers and Readers Publishing, Inc., 1996) ISBN 0-86316-099-9.
- Tercer Milenio, Revista de Literatura, Año III, No. 1, Ed. by Pedro López Adorno (Tecer Milenio, Inc., 1996) ISSN 1075-0967.
- Hispanic American Literature, A Brief Introduction and Anthology, Ed. by Nicolás Kanellos (Harper Collins College Publishers, 1995) ISBN 0-673-46956-5.
- Not Black and White, Inside Words From The Bronx WritersCorps (Plain View Press, 1995) ISBN 0-911051-83-X.
- Paper Dance, 55 Latino Poets, Ed. by Victor Hernandez Cruz, Leroy V. Quintana and Virgil Suarez (Persea Books, 1995) ISBN 0-89255-201-8.
- Boricuas, Ed. by Roberto Santiago (Ballantine Books/Random House, Inc., 1995) ISBN 0-345-39502-6.
- PoeSIDA, (Ollantay Press, 1995) ISBN 0-9625127-4-5.
- In Other Words, Literature by Latinas of the United States, Ed. by Roberta Fernandez (Arte Público Press/University of Houston, 1994) ISBN 1-55885-110-0.
- Stone On Stone, Piedra Sobre Piedra, Ed. by Zoe Anglesey (Open Hand Publishing, 1994) ISBN 0-940880-48-2.
- Unsettling America, An Anthology of Contemporary Multicultural Poetry, Ed. by Maria Mazziotti Gillan and Jennifer Gillan (Penguin Books, 1994) ISBN 0-14-023778-X.
- Aloud, Voices From The Nuyorican Poets Cafe, Ed. by Miguel Algarin and Bob Holman (Henry Holt and Company, 1994) ISBN 0-8050-3275-4.
- Here Is My Kingdom, Hispanic-American Literature and Art for Young People, Ed. by Charles Sullivan (Harry N. Abrams, Inc., 1994) ISBN 0-8109-3422-1.
- Latino Poetry (Globe Fearon Educational Publisher, 1994) ISBN 0-8359-0726-0.
- The Many Worlds of Literature, Ed. by Stuart Hirschberg (Macmillan Publishing Company, 1994); ISBN 0-02-355082-1.
- Hear My Voice, Ed. by Laurie King (Addison-Wesley's Alternative Publishing Group, 1994) ISBN 978-0-201-81841-3.
- Long Shot, Vol. 15, (Long Shot Prod., 1993) ISSN 0895-9773.
- Papiros De Babel: Anthology of Puerto Rican Poetry in New York, Ed. by Pedro López Adorno (Univ. of Puerto Rico/Río Piedras, 1991).
- Puerto Rican Writers at Home in the USA, Ed. by Faythe Turner (Open Hand Publishing Inc., 1991).
- New Rain; Vol. 7 & 8, Ed. by Judy Simmons (Blind Beggar Press Inc., 1990).
- Taller Alma Boricua, Reflecting on 20 Years of the Puerto Rican Workshop ’69-89, (El Museo del Barrio, 1990).
- Hanging Loose 52, (Hanging Loose Press, 1988).
- Centro Boletín, Spring 1988, (Centro de Estudios Puertorriqueños/Hunter College/CUNY, 1988).
- Blackworld, Vol . X VII, No. 2 (University at Stony Brook, SUNY, 1988).
- Woman of Her Word, Hispanic Women Write, (Arte Público Press/University of Houston; Houston, TX; 1987).
- Lluvia Sobre La Isla, (Casa De Las Américas, Ciudad de La Habana, Cuba, 1987).
- Conditions: Fourteen, (Conditions, 1987).
- Art Against Apartheid: Works For Freedom, (IKON Inc., 1986).
- Breaking, (Centro de Estudios Puertorriqueños/Hunter College/CUNY, 1985).
- Hispanics In the U.S.A., (Denmarks Radio, 1984).
- Areito, Vol. 8 No. 29, (Ediciones Vitral, 1982).
- Third Woman, Vol. 1, No. 2, (Third Woman Press/Chicano-Riqueño Studies/Indiana University, 1982).
- Leaving the Bough, (International Publishers, 1982).
- A Decade of Hispanic Literature, (Revista Chicano-Riqueña/University of Houston, 1982).
- Antología de la Poesia de la Mujer Puertorriqueña, (Peninsula Publishing Co., 1981) ISBN 0-916312-08-9.
- Bronx Roots, Vol. 1, (Bronx Poets & Writers Alliance/Bronx Council on the Arts, 1981).
- New Rain, Vol. 1 (Blind Beggar Press, 1981).
- Herejes y mitificadores, (Ediciones Huracán, 1980).
- Words To Go, (Cultural Council Foundation/CETA Artist Project, 1980).
- Sunbury, 9, (Sunbury Press, 1980).
- Chiricú, (Chicano-Riqueño Studies/Indiana University, 1980).
- Vortice: Literatura, Arte y Critica, Vol. 2, No. 2-3, (Dept. of Spanish and Portuguese/Stanford Univ., 1979).
- Revista Chicano-Riqueña, Año 7, No. 2, (Indiana University Northwest, 1979).
- Afro Realism, (MenWem Press, 1979).
- Hispanic Arts, No. 13, (Association of Hispanic Arts, 1979).
- Chrysalis, No. 7 1979.
- New York State Waterways Project, Vol. 1, No. 9, (Ten Penny Players, 1979).
- Heresies: Third World Women, Vol. 2, No. 4, Issue 8, (1979).
- Maintrend, No.3, (Anti-Imperialist Cultural Union, 1979).
- Womanrise, (Shamal Books, 1978).
- Ordinary Women, (Ordinary Women Press, 1978).
- The Next World, Ed. by Joseph Bruchac (The Crossing Press, 1978).
- Conditions: Three, (Conditions, 1978).
- Sunbury, 4, (Sunbury Press, 1976).
- Shantih, Vol.3, No. 3, (Shantih, 1975).
- Journal of Contemporary Puerto Rican Thought, (Midwest Institute of Puerto Rican Studies and Culture, 1975).
- Nuyorican Poetry, (William Morrow & Co., 1975).
- Sunbury, 2, (Sunbury Press, 1974).
- El Grupo: Canciones Y Poesia (LP recording) (Disco Canto Libre, 1974).

Productions

- Featured Author, Until We Win; Pregones Theater; Bronx, NY; 2011, 2010.
- Featured Poet in Concert with the Ibrahim González Trio: :

- Mandalas & Metaphors; Westfield State University Downtown Arts Gallery; 2011.
- DivaNations, Nuyorican Poets Café; 2010.
- Ovations School of Humanities & Social Sciences/Springfield Technical Community College, 2007.

- Featured Performer, Nuyorican Poet: Sandra María Esteves, Nuyorican Poets Café, 2009.
- Director/Producer, Latina Voices Visible in The Light, Challenge & Vision Productions, 2004
- Production Director, Bringing Down the Moon/Millenium Goddess Spoken Word Ensemble, Nuyorican Poets Cafe, 1999.
- Production Director, Women In Prison: Our Sistas, Ourselves; Medgar Evers College/International Working Women's Day Committee, 1998
- Poetry Production Director, For Mumia, An Evening of Poetry and Jazz (poets’ choral in performance) Felipe Luciano's Wordchestra at Aaron Davis Hall/The NY Coalition to Free Mumia Abu Jamal, 1997
- Producer/Executive Director, African Caribbean Poetry Theater, 1983-1990: :

- Director/Producer, Rose In Spanish Harlem, 1988.
- Producer, First Class by Candido Tirado (full-length equity showcase stage play), 1987.
- Producer, Accession, 1987. – Producer, Purple Paradise, 1986.
- Producer, Impact (full-length, equity showcase stage play), 1986.
- Producer/Creator, Grito de Lares, a bilingual multi-media poetry anthology (equity showcase); 1986, 1984.
- Producer, American Poets and Play Reading Series at Invisible Performance Workshop, 1986.
- Producer, Sweet Stuff (full-length, equity showcase stage play), 1985.
- Producer, Hakim (one-act, stage play touring production), 1986.

- Poetry Series Director, Voices From The Belly Poetry Series at Galeria Moríviví; 1983, 1982, 1980.
- Poetry Series Director/Coordinator, New Rican Village Poetry Series, 1978.
- Contributing Poet, The Ones; The Cultural Council Foundation, CETA Artist Project at Innerspace/Outerspace Mobile Theater/Triangle Theater/Long Island University; 1978.
- Resident-Scriptwriter and Artistic Consultant, The Steve Cannon Show (soap opera), 1978.
- Co-Author/Producer, La Cura: A Ritual of Healing & Feeling, (multi-media dramatization with poetry, music and dance); 1976-1978.
- Contributing Author, Maria Cristina (poetic dramatization in dance); Conferencia Internaclonal de Solidaridad Con La Independencia De Puerto Rico; Consejo Nacional De Cultura/Ballet Nacional De Cuba; La Habana, Cuba; 1975.

== Awards ==
Esteves received her first poetry fellowship in 1980 from New York State CAPS. In 2010, she received a prestigious NEA Master Artist Award from Pregones Theater.

- Pleneros De La 21 Master Artist Award; 2012.
- Pregones Theater/NEA Master Artist Award; 2010.
- Con Tinta Award; Acentos Poetry Collective/Associated Writing Programs; New York, NY; 2008.
- Poet, Universes Poetic Theater Ensemble Company 10th Anniversary; New York, NY; 2006.
- The Owen Vincent Dodson Memorial Award For Poetry; Blind Beggar Press; 2002.
- Arts Review 2001 Honoree; Bronx Council on the Arts; 2001.
- The Louis Reyes Rivera Lifetime Achievement Award; La Causa/Amherst College; 2000.
- Premios Culturales Julia de. Burgos; Centro Cultural Puertorriqueño de Nueva York; 1998.
- Proclamation from the Mayor of the City of Mayaguez, Puerto Rico; 1998.
- Outstanding Achievement; Latino Task Force/University of Michigan; 1996.
- Outstanding Achievement; LASO/John Jay College of Criminal Justice; 1995.
- Edgar Allan Poe Literary Award; Bronx Historical Society; 1992.
- Outstanding Achievement in the Latino Community; Herencia Latina, New York University; 1991.
- Poetry Fellowship; New York Foundation for the Arts; 1985.
- Best Small Press Publication 1981 (for Yerba Buena), Library Journal; 1981.
- Poetry Fellowship; New York State CAPS; 1980.
- Pope Generoso Memorial Scholarship, Cardinal Spellman High School; 1966.

== See also ==
- Puerto Rican poetry
- Puerto Rican literature
- American literature in Spanish
- Puerto Ricans in the United States
- Nuyorican Poets Cafe
- Nuyorican movement
- List of Puerto Ricans
- List of Puerto Rican writers
