= Bob Holman =

American poet and poetry activist

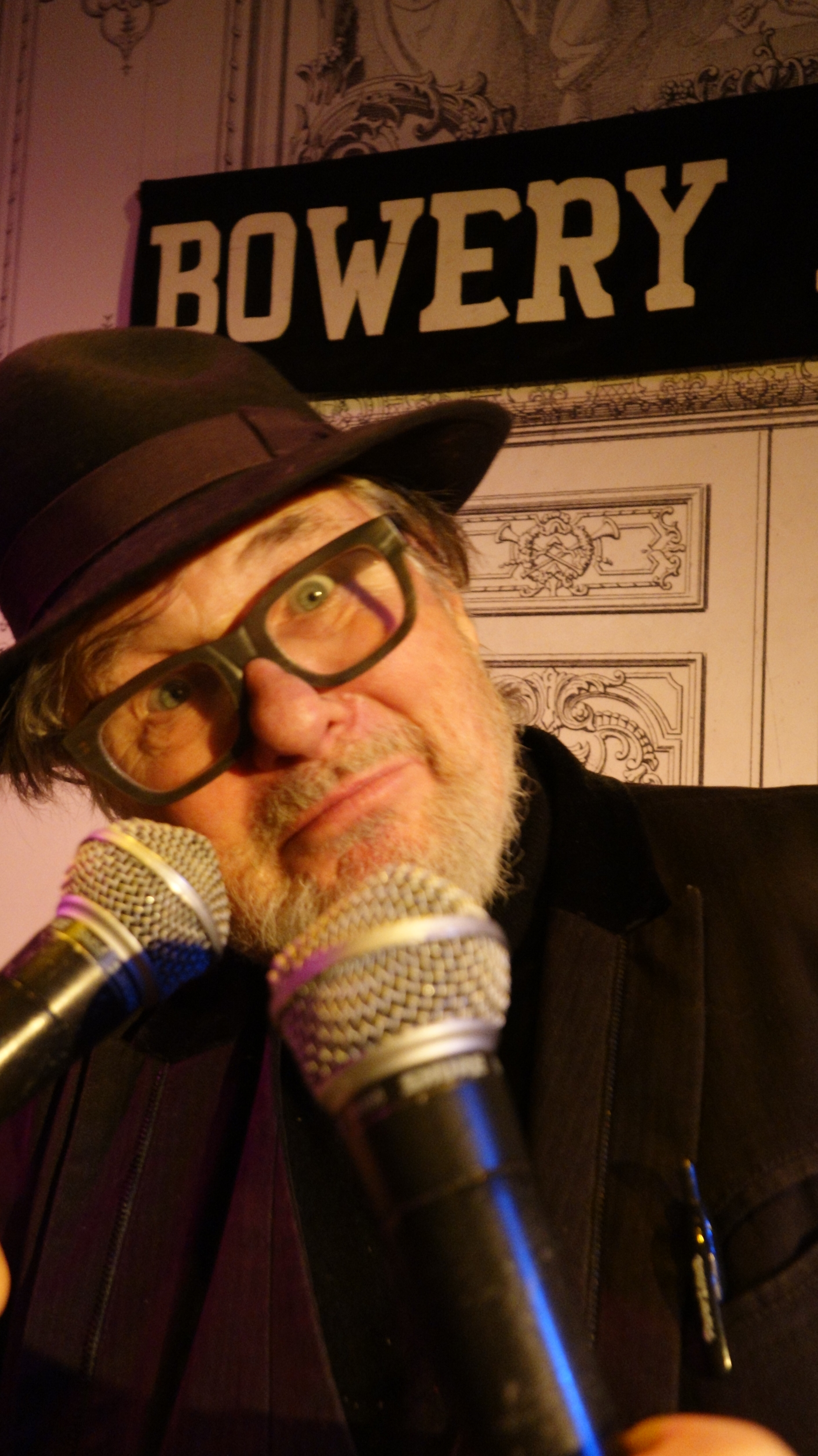
Holman in 2024

Bob Holman is an American poet and poetry activist, most closely identified with the oral tradition, the spoken word, and poetry slam. As a promoter of poetry in many media, Holman has spent the last four decades working variously as an author, editor, publisher, performer, emcee of live events, director of theatrical productions, producer of films and television programs, record label executive, university professor, and archivist. He was described by Henry Louis Gates Jr. in The New Yorker as "the postmodern promoter who has done more to bring poetry to cafes and bars than anyone since Ferlinghetti."

== Early years ==
Holman was born in LaFollette, Tennessee in 1948 and raised in Harlan, Kentucky, the child of "a coal miner's daughter and the only Jew in town." His father committed suicide when Holman was two. After his mother remarried, Holman was raised in rural Ohio. He attended Columbia College and graduated in 1970 with a degree in English. At Columbia, Holman studied with Kenneth Koch, Eric Bentley, and Michael Wood but claims that his "major poetry schooling," was "the Lower East Side, with Allen Ginsberg, John Giorno, Anne Waldman, Miguel Piñero, Hettie Jones, Ed Sanders, Amiri Baraka, Ted Berrigan, Alice Notley, Pedro Pietri, David Henderson, Steve Cannon, et al."

== Live poetry ==
=== St. Mark's Poetry Project ===
Since its founding in 1966, the St. Mark's Poetry Project in New York has been (according to John Ashbery) "a major force in contemporary American literature." Holman coordinated the readings at the Poetry Project from 1977 through 1984 and was on the Project's board of directors from 1980 through 1984.

=== CETA Artists Project ===
Holman was an original participant in the Cultural Council Foundation's CETA Artists Project, the largest federally-funded artist project since the WPA. His jobs as a public poet included being the scribe of the Village Halloween parade, creating an oral history of the early years of the St. Marks Poetry Project, and teaching 6-year-olds at an after school project in Chinatown. He participated in "Words to Go," a mobile troupe of writers and poets that toured New York City in 1978 and 1979. Other members of the troupe included Pedro Pietri, Sandra María Esteves, Roland Legiardi-Laura, Madeleine Keller, Nathan Whiting and Cassia Berman. An anthology of these poems, edited by Bob Stokes, was published by CCF.

=== Nuyorican Poets Café ===
Since its founding by Miguel Algarín in 1973, the Nuyorican Poets Café's purpose "has always been to provide a stage for the artists traditionally under-represented in the mainstream media and culture." As co-director of the Nuyorican, Holman introduced slam poetry to the café in 1988 and emceed the venue's slams through 1996. In 1993, he founded the Nuyorican Poets Café Live!, a touring company of poets.

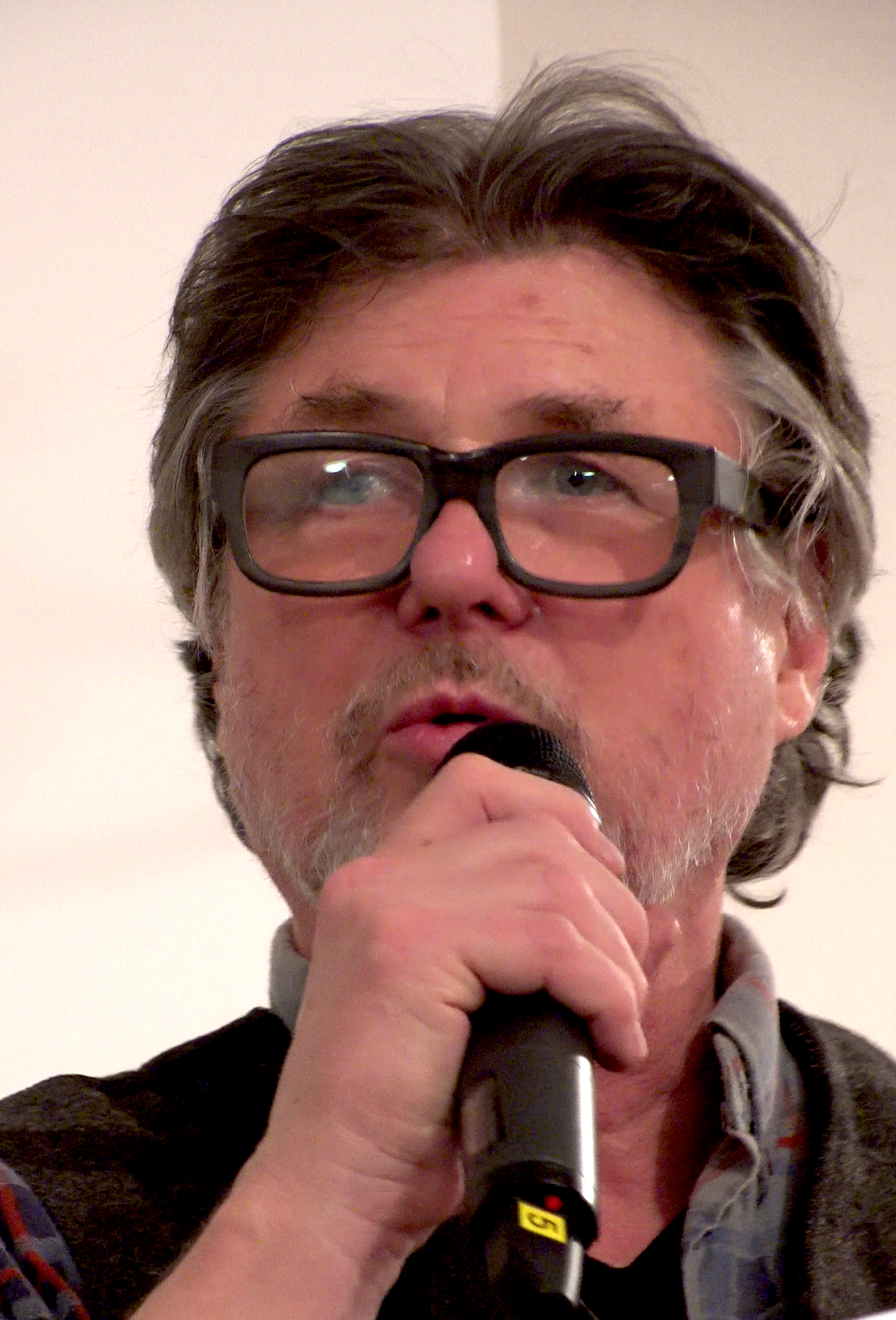
Holman in 2016

==== "Aloud! Voices from the Nuyorican Poets Café" ====
Holman and Algarin were co-editors of the anthology entitled "Aloud! Voices from the Nuyorican Poets Café." Published in 1994, "Aloud!" was a winner of the 1994 American Book Award from the Before Columbus Foundation.

=== Bowery Poetry Club ===
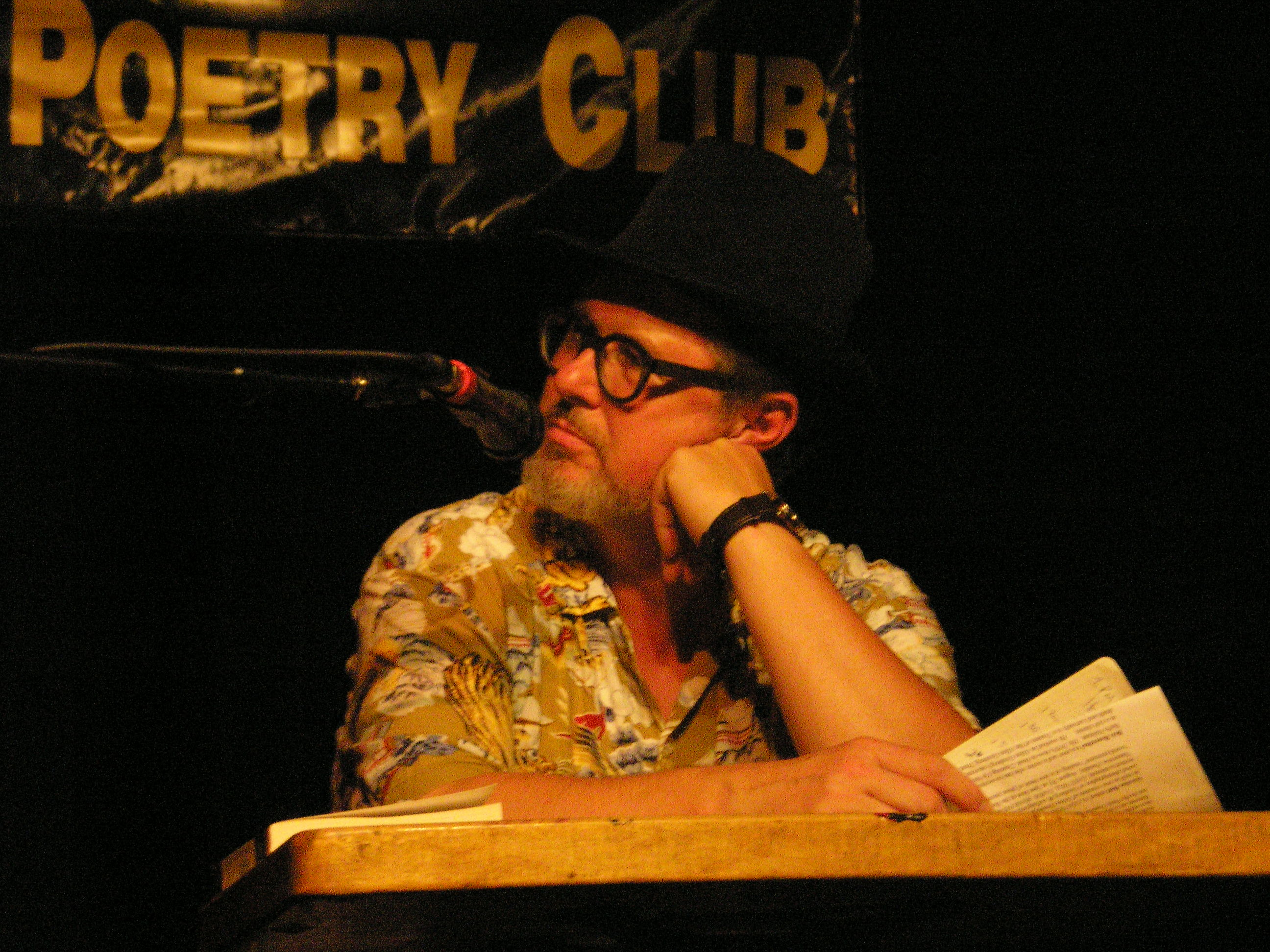
Bob Holman in 2006

Holman is the founder and proprietor of the Bowery Poetry Club, which opened to the public in September 2002. Billed as "a Home for Poetry," the club sponsors poetry events every night, and workshops and readings in the afternoons. In an interview with The New York Times shortly after the club's opening, Holman said, "They say no one has ever gone broke running a bar in New York, but we're going to give it a shot." In 2004 the club won a Village Award from the Greenwich Village Society for Historic Preservation. The awards are given "to help . . . recognize the people, places, and businesses that make a significant contribution to the legendary quality of life in Greenwich Village, The East Village and NoHo."

==== Bowery Poetry Books ====
In conjunction with YBK Publishers, Holman founded Bowery Poetry Books in 2005. Since then the imprint has published 13 titles, including works by Taylor Mead, Janet Hamill, Fay Chiang, Paul L. Mills and Black Cracker. It also published an anthology entitled "The Bowery Bartenders Big Book of Poems."

==== Bowery records ====
In 2007 Holman released a CD entitled "The Awesome Whatever" – produced, and with music, by Vito Ricci—on the Bowery Records label.

== Theater/ Poets Theater ==
Holman studied with Steven Gilborn and Eric Bentley at Columbia, where he played Baal in Baal by Brecht, and Krapp in Krapp's Last Tape by Beckett. In 1971 he co-founded the Woods Hole Theater Company with Karen Cutler, Philip Himberg, and Shaine Marinson, where he was Gogo in Waiting for Godot, and created a community version of the Wizard of Oz.

Holman has directed and/or produced a steady stream of plays during his career, most of them written by poets. These include:

- Ted Berrigan's "Clear the Range" at St. Clement's Episcopal Church Theater, 1977
- "4 Plays by Edwin Denby" at the Eye and Ear Theater, March 1981
- Ed Friedman's "The White Snake" at the Eye and Ear Theater, May 1982
- W. H. Auden's "Paid on Both Sides", at the Eye and Ear Theater, May 1983
- A series produced at St. Mark's Church between 1988 and 1990 comprising Millicent Dillon's "She Is in Tangiers: Life and Work of Jane Bowles", Vladimir Mayakovsky's "Mayakovsky, a Tragedy," Tristan Tzara's "The Gas Heart", Antonin Artaud's "Jet of Blood", and Holman's own collaboration with Bob Rosenthal, "The Cause of Gravity"/"The Whore of the Alpines"/"Bicentennial Suicide."
- D. Zhonzinsky's "Stop at Nothing" at The Kitchen, 1992
- Pedro Pietri's "Eat Rocks" at New Dramatists NYC
- Ed Sanders's "A Night at the Rebel Café" at the Bowery Poetry Club, 2003

== At WNYC-TV and WNYC-FM ==
Between 1987 and 1993 Holman was the producer and host of "Poetry Spots" for WNYC-TV, a public television station in New York City. In a foreshadowing of the technique used in "The United States of Poetry," each "Poetry Spot" was a short film built around a single poet performing a poem. The "Poetry Spots" series won New York Emmy Awards in 1989 and 1992.

In 2004–2005, Holman was Poet-in-Residence at WNYC-FM, a storied public radio station in New York City.

== Mouth Almighty/ Mercury Records ==
In 1996, Holman, Sekou Sundiata, and Bill Adler co-founded Mouth Almighty Records under the auspices of Mercury Records. Over the course of the next three years the label released 18 titles, including recordings by the Last Poets, Allen Ginsberg, and Sekou Sundiata, two CDs of short fiction from The New Yorker magazine, and a two-CD set of readings of Edgar Allan Poe produced by Hal Willner. Mouth Almighty's four-CD box set of readings by William Burroughs, produced by the poet John Giorno, was nominated for a Grammy Award in 1999.

In 1997, the Mouth Almighty slam team, coached by Holman, won the National Poetry Slam.

In 1998 Mouth Almighty released Holman's own "In With the Out Crowd," produced by Hal Willner.

== "United States of Poetry" ==
In 1996 Holman, director Mark Pellington, and producer Joshua Blum teamed up to create "The United States of Poetry," a critically acclaimed five-part PBS television series. The program featured over 60 poets, rappers, cowboy poets, American Sign Language poets and Slammers. In a review for The New York Times, John J. O'Connor wrote, "Wandering all over the map, geographical and literary, 'The United States of Poetry' unabashedly celebrates the Word. These days, that's downright courageous." Identified as "the brainchild of Bob Holman," the series is described as "an excellent presentation of 20th Century poetry" on the website of the Academy of American Poets.

The television series was accompanied into the market-place by a book and a soundtrack recording. The book, published by Abrams Books, was co-edited by Holman, Pellington, and Blum, with an introduction by Holman.

The soundtrack, underscored with music by tomandandy, was issued by Mouth Almighty Records. In a review for 'The New York Times', Stephen Holden wrote, "The [soundtrack] illustrates how thoroughly the lines between literature and popular culture have dissolved over the last 40 years."

== Teaching positions ==
Among Holman's first teaching jobs was a stint in July 1991 at the Jack Kerouac School of Disembodied Poetics, which had been founded at the Naropa Institute in Boulder, Colorado by Chogyam Trungpa, Allen Ginsberg and Anne Waldman in 1974. Holman's course was entitled "From Rap to Zap." Between 1993 and 1996 Holman was a professor of writing at The New School for Social Research, and from 1998 through 2002 a visiting professor of writing and integrated arts at Bard College. In 2003 Holman relocated to Columbia University's School of the Arts where, as a visiting professor of writing, he taught the graduate course "Exploding Text: Poetry Performance." In 2007, as a visiting professor at New York University's Tisch School of the Arts, Holman began teaching a course called "Art and the Public Sphere." From 2010 to 2016, Holman suspended his teaching activities to focus on the Endangered Language Alliance. Holman taught his oral poetry syllabus "Exploding Text: Poetry and Performance" at Princeton University in the fall of 2017.

== Endangered language activism ==
=== Endangered Language Alliance ===
In 2010, in cooperation with linguists Daniel Kaufman and Juliette Blevins, Holman founded the Endangered Language Alliance. The work, he says, comprises a mission: "We are so in awe of the power of the book that we've forgotten the power of sound and the magic of sense nested in sound. Everybody's fighting for the preservation of species, but who's fighting for the preservation of languages, which are in fact the souls...of culture itself?"

=== KHONSAY: Poem of Many Tongues ===
In 2015, with City Lore's Steve Zeitlin as producer, Holman directed the poetry film KHONSAY: Poem of Many Tongues. Supported by the NEA and NYSCA, KHONSAY documents 50 speakers of endangered, minority, or treasure languages in the cento form, with one line from each speaker.

=== Language Matters with Bob Holman ===
Produced by David Grubin, Language Matters with Bob Holman aired nationally on PBS in January 2015. The documentary film focuses upon the rapid extinction of many of planet Earth's human languages and the multifarious struggles and efforts to save and preserve them. Holman states that "There are between 6,000 and 7,000 languages spoken in the world today. Languages have always come and gone but what is happening today is "a global crisis of massive proportions."

In his review for the journal Literary Kicks, Levi Asher called Language Matters "a delightful and captivating two-hour documentary...Language Matters appears to be a television documentary about remote cultures and faraway peoples. It turns out to be a show about us all."

In 2015, Holman was awarded Ford Foundation funding to tour Language Matters throughout Alaska, and to organize poetry workshops that included speakers of Alaska's Native Languages, as well as to screen the film throughout Hawaii. The screening tours and workshops were detailed by Holman in a chapter in "Language and Globalization: An Autoethnographic Approach", edited by Maryam Borjian and due for publication by Routledge in 2017.

=== LINES Ballet collaboration ===
In 2016–2017, Holman collaborated with Alonzo King's LINES Ballet company, who produced a ballet inspired by endangered languages which was performed in spring 2017.

== Bob Holman Audio/Video Poetry Collection ==
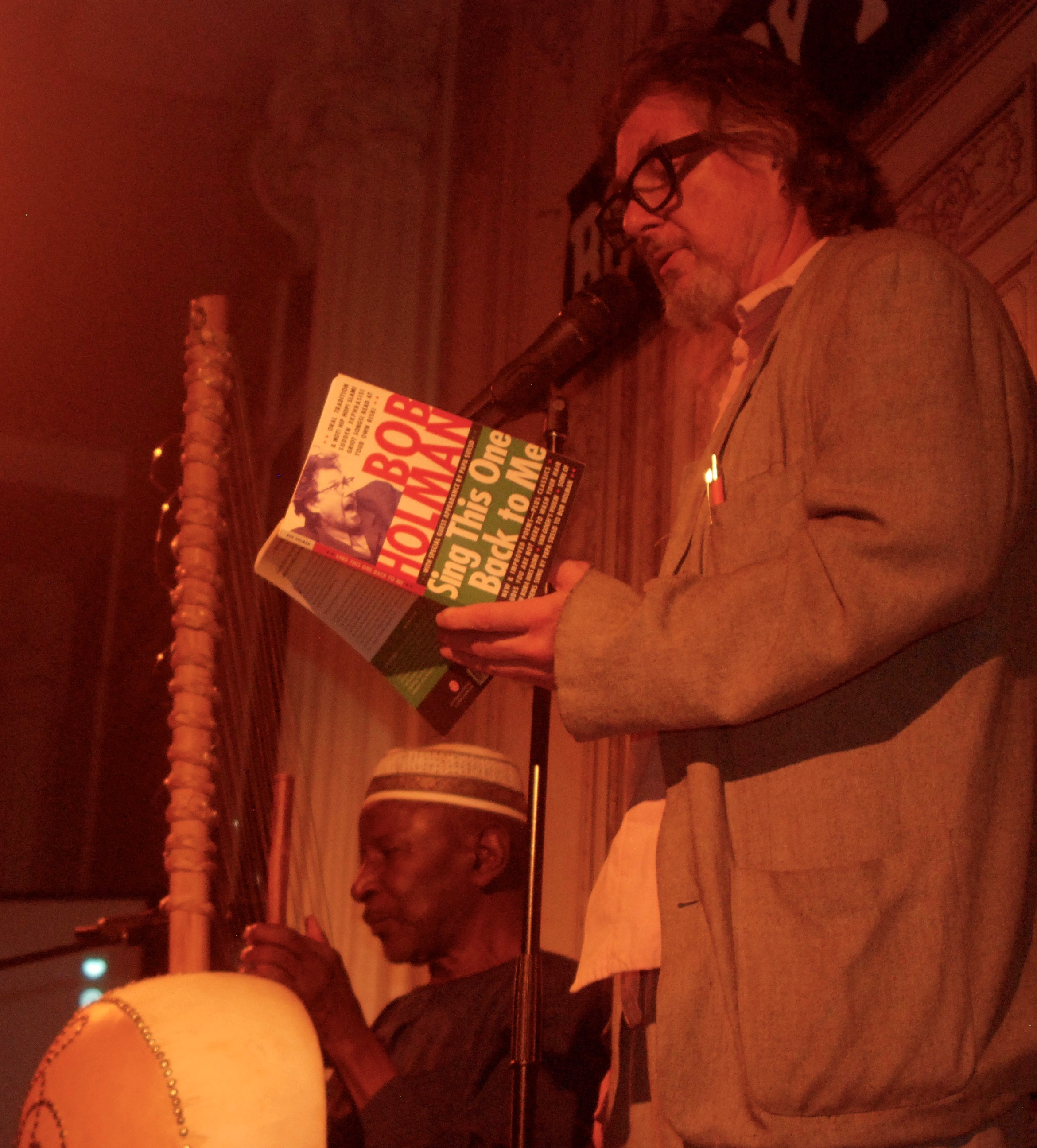
Holman performing with Papa Susso at the Bowery Poetry Club in 2016

New York University's Fales Library is the home of The Bob Holman Audio/Video Poetry Collection, a multimedia collection documenting spoken word performances and productions between the years 1977 and 2002. Key items include spoken word projects featuring and/or produced by Holman himself. Marvin Taylor, director of the Fales Library, has said Holman's collection "is a magnificent resource for anyone who cares about New York's spoken word scene during the last 40 years. No one else has such documentation."

== Collaboration with musicians ==
Holman performs poetry on a periodic basis with griot and kora player Papa Susso.

In June 2017, Holman performed with Serhiy Zhadan as part of the show "1917–2017: Tychyna, Zhadan and The Dogs" at the La MaMa Experimental Theatre Club, directed by Virlana Tkacz.

== Filmography ==
- The United States Of Poetry, (Directed by Mark Pellington), PBS, 1995
- On The Road With Bob Holman, Rattapallax, 2012,
- Witness Downtown Rising Renga, (Directed by Nikhil Melnechuk), 2012,
- KHONSAY: Poem of Many Tongues, (Directed by Bob Holman and Produced by Steve Zeitlin), 2015
- Language Matters With Bob Holman, (Directed by David Grubin) PBS, 2015
- Talking Pictures: Bob Holman reads ekphrastic poems inspired by paintings of his late wife, Elizabeth Murray, (Directed by Kristi Zea, music by David Lang), 2019
- Ginsberg's Karma (Directed by Ram Devineni, produced by Rattapallax), 2021
- We Are the Dinosaur (Directed by H. Paul Moon, a.d. Kyabell Glass, music by Marc Ribot), 2023

== Bibliography ==
- Bicenntential Suicide: a novel to be performed, w/ Bob Rosenthal, Frontward Books, 1976.
- The Rainbow Raises Its Shoulder/When a Flower Grows, Chinatown Planning Council, 1979
- Tear to Open: This this this this this this, Power Mad Press, 1979.
- 8 Chinese Poems, Peeka Boo Press, 1981
- SWEAT&SEX&Politics!, Peeka Boo Press, 1981
- PANIC*DJ: Performance Text, Poems Raps Songs, Larry Qualls and Associates/University Arts Resources, 1988.
- Cupid's Cashbox (with drawings by Elizabeth Murray), Jordan Davies, 1988.
- Aloud: Voices From The Nuyorican Poets Cafe, (Co-edited with Miguel Algarín), Holt Paperbacks, 1994
- Bob Holman's The Collect Call of the Wild, John Macrae/Henry Holt & Company, 1995.
- Beach Simplifies Horizon (with illustrations by Robert Moskowitz), The Grenfell Press, 1998.
- Picasso in Barcelona, Paper Kite Press, 2011
- Crossing State Lines: An American Renga, (Co-edited with Carol Muske-Dukes), Farrar, Stauss and Giroux, 2011
- A Couple of Ways of Doing Something (a collaboration with Chuck Close), Aperture, 2006.
- Sing This One Back To Me, Coffee House Press, 2013.
- The Cutouts (Matisse), Peek A Boo Press, 2017
- Life Poem, YBK/Bowery Books, 2019
- The Unspoken, YBK/Bowery Books, 2019
- Bob Holman's India Journals, Rattapallax, 2021

== Personal life ==
Holman was married to artist Elizabeth Murray from 1982 until her death in 2007. The couple had two daughters, both born in the early 1980s: Sophia Murray Holman Ellsberg and Daisy Sally Murray Holman.
