= Nuyorican movement =

Puerto Rican cultural movement in New York

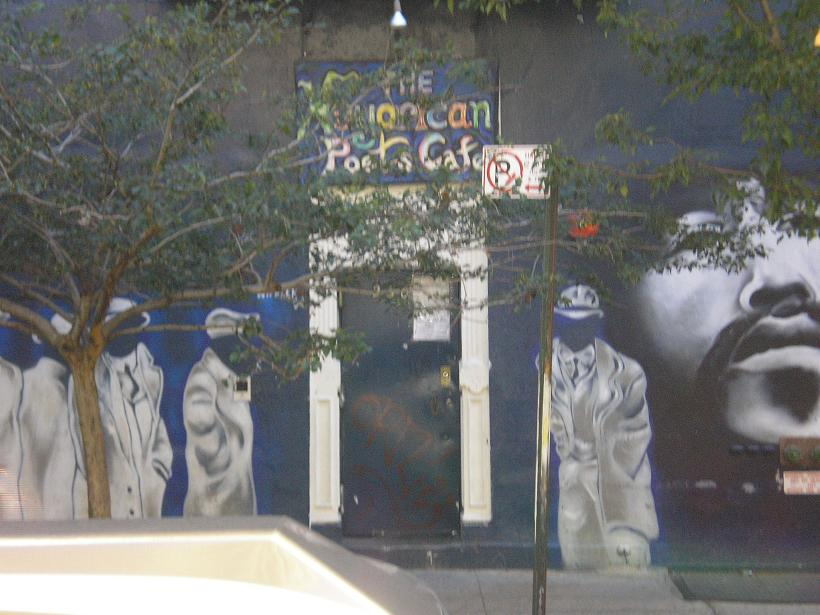
Nuyorican Poets Café

The Nuyorican movement is a cultural and intellectual movement involving poets, writers, musicians and artists who are Puerto Rican or of Puerto Rican descent, who live in or near New York City, and either call themselves or are known as Nuyoricans. It originated in the late 1960s and early 1970s in neighborhoods such as Loisaida, East Harlem, Williamsburg, and the South Bronx as a means to validate Puerto Rican experience in the United States, particularly for poor and working-class people who suffered from marginalization, ostracism, and discrimination.

The term Nuyorican was originally used as an insult until leading artists such as Miguel Algarín reclaimed it and transformed its meaning. Key cultural organizations such as the Nuyorican Poets Café, the Caribbean Social Club , and Charas/El Bohio on the Lower East Side, the Puerto Rican Traveling Theater, Agüeybaná Bookstore, Mixta Gallery, Clemente Soto Vélez Cultural Center, El Museo del Barrio, and El Maestro were some of the institutional manifestations of this movement. The next generation of Nuyorican cultural hubs include PRdream.com, Camaradas El Barrio in Spanish Harlem and Piragua Art Space on the Lower East Side of Manhattan. Social and political counterparts to those establishments in late 1960s and 70s New York include the Young Lords and the ASPIRA Association.

== Charas/El Bohio ==
=== History ===
Puerto Rico's history and culture on the Lower East Side, known to much of its Puerto Rican community as Loisaida, is long and extensive. From early 1400s to the end of the 1800s, Puerto Rico had slavery and was dutiful to the Spanish Crown. With granted autonomy from Spain in 1897, Puerto Rico was allowed to elect and print their own currency for a year as a territory. In 1898, The United States seized control over the territory. Being a sugar cane and coffee dependent nation allowed for the United States to intervene and rule Puerto Rico politically and economically, with no intention of giving Puerto Ricans citizenship. In 1910, the American government grew fearful of an uprising. In order to keep Puerto Rico under control from being independent, the United States imposed U.S. citizenship, never consulting the actual people who resided in Puerto Rico. Since the United States only allowed or the production of sugarcane the people started to go hungry, leaving them with no choice but to leave the island in search for a better life in the United States. Puerto Ricans began to migrate to places like New York City, specifically to Puerto Rican enclaves, such as the Lower East Side, San Juan Hill, and Spanish Harlem, creating a new identity, culture, and way of life.

With the formation of neighborhoods and culture, arose a Latin American gem formerly the P.S. 64 school building. The building was renamed Charas/El Bohio Community Center, repurposed, and appropriated into Puerto Rican immigrant life. CHARAS/El Bohio was a cultural center established in 1977. The center was built with the intention of revitalizing Loisaida, to encourage Latino pride and community action, to preserve the neighborhood and protect those still living there. The building, formerly PS 64, was abandoned by the Department of Education and taken over and remodeled by Adopt-A-Building. Much of the funding to renovate the building was provided by federal grants or directly from the City. CHARAS moved into the building shortly after, followed by the El Bohio Corporation. CHARAS was the continuation of the Real Great Society, and was spearheaded by Chino Garcia and Armando Pérez.

Chino Garcia and Armando Pérez were and are two of many founders and collaborators of CHARA/ El Bohio Community Center. More importantly they helped form many artists in the 1960s. They renovated classrooms into art studios and rehearsal rooms. This influenced the demographic of the Lower East Side profusely. The original organization was built in 1964 with the intention of helping youth gang members use their skills and ideals for positive use by encouraging business development and educational programs. CHARAS was also involved actively in urban ecology, developing many of the LES community gardens. El Bohio was more artistically based, hosting cultural performances and providing a space for Latino artists to showcase their work and celebrate Latino culture through the arts.

=== Conflicts and controversies ===
Despite massive community efforts to save the building, CHARAS/El Bohio faced numerous obstacles presented by Mayor Giuliani and Councilmember Antonio Pagán, which ultimately led to their losing of the building in the late 1990s to Gregg Singer, a developer who has been attempting to demolish the building and build high rise dorms for nearly 20 years. His efforts have been repeatedly halted by CB3, who made the building a NYC landmark shortly after he began to destroy moldings of almost a hundred years of age. The landmarking of PS 64 was an immediate reaction to the beginning of Singer's process of demolishing the building. The involvement of CB3 is especially significant, as the board grew involved after a number of Latin Kings went to them pleading for assistance in saving the building. The two groups formed an unlikely alliance in an attempt to preserve the space, and were together successful in saving it as a historic landmark, thus halting Singer's attempts at demolition and reconstruction. PS 64 was home to a number of different organizations. Besides CHARAS (formerly the Real Great Society) and El Bohio, the building was also occupied by artists and activists who rented out studio space, an art gallery, numerous art programs and afterschool programs for students, and other artistic programs and organizations centered around music, dance, and theater. Many of the activists and artists involved in the creation and preservation of the cultural space were former or active gang members, specifically members of the Latin Kings and Queens, looking to work within their communities and foster positive change. In April 1999, CHARAS cofounder Armando Perez was found murdered outside his wife's home in Queens a death which many presume was gang related, though there was no evidence found to corroborate this theory. At the time of his death, Perez had been deeply involved in the fight to save PS 64 from Gregg Singer.

=== Present day ===
In 2017, Mayor de Blasio announced that he would be buying back PS 64 from Singer, and making efforts to revert the building back to a community center. The likelihood of this occurring was immediately shot down by Singer, who made a statement following Mayor de Blasio's claiming he had no intention to sell the building. How Mayor de Blasio will respond is not yet known. Though perhaps one of the more powerful political leaders, he was not the first to make public attempts to retrieve the building. Councilwoman Rosie Mendez has shown open opposition to Singer during her time as councilwoman, an attitude which is held by current city councilwoman Carlina Rivera. When Rivera's campaign was endorsed by the Villager, the author of the endorsement article discussed seeing Rivera as a teenager at a protest to save the community center when it was first lost. She has been a continuous threat to Singer since. During Rivera's campaign, Singer distributed literature around the Lower East Side promoting three of Rivera's rival candidates, encouraging the community to vote for any candidate besides Rivera. Despite his efforts, he must now attempt to work with Rivera, as she poses one of his greatest obstacles. Although Singer originally proposed a demolition of the building and the development of a twenty-story dorm building, his proposals have continuously been rejected by Community Board 2, as the demolition of the building coincides with the policies for construction on a landmarked building. A more recent proposal produced by Singer shows the building in its original form, remodeled only slightly, but still acting as a dorm building for college students. As of November 2017, community activists were advocating the city Department of Buildings to void the original sale of the building to Singer and to reacquire the building

== Literature and poetry ==
The Nuyorican movement significantly influenced Puerto Rican literature, spurring themes such as cultural identity, civil rights, and discrimination. The Nuyorican Poets Café, a non-profit organization in Alphabet City, Manhattan, founded by Miguel Piñero, Miguel Algarín, and Pedro Pietri. Prominent figures include poets Giannina Braschi, Willie Perdomo, Edwin Torres (poet), Nancy Mercado, and Sandra María Esteves. Later voices include Lemon Andersen, Emanuel Xavier, Mariposa (María Teresa Fernández), Bonafide Rojas and Caridad de la Luz (La Bruja), as well as non-Latino poets including Dael Orlandersmith, Paul Beatty, Carl Hancock Rux Cheryl Boyce Taylor and Saul Williams. Current organizations include The Acentos Foundation originally based in the Bronx, New York City which publishes poetry, fiction, memoir, interviews, translations, and artwork by emerging and established Latino/a writers and artists four times a year through The Acentos Review, and Capicu Cultural Showcase based in Brooklyn, New York City.

== Music ==
Nuyorican music became popular in the 1960s with the recordings of Tito Puente's "Oye Como Va" and Ray Barretto's "El Watusi" and incorporated Spanglish lyrics.

Latin bands who had formerly played the imported styles of cha-cha-cha or charanga began to develop their own unique Nuyorican music style by adding flutes and violins to their orchestras. This new style came to be known as the Latin boogaloo. Some of the musicians who helped develop this unique music were Joe Cuba with "Bang Bang", Richie Ray and Bobby Cruz with "Mr. Trumpet Man", and the brothers Charlie and Eddie Palmieri. Subsequently, Nuyorican music has evolved into Latin rap, freestyle music, Latin house, salsa, Nuyorican soul and reggaeton.

The development of the Nuyorican music can be seen in salsa and hip hop music. Musician and singer Willie Colón shows this diaspora in his salsa music by blending the sounds of the trombone, an instrument popular in the New York urban scene, and the cuatro, an instrument native to Puerto Rico and prevalent in salsa music. Furthermore, many salsa songs address this diaspora and relationship between the homeland, in this case, Puerto Rico and the migrant community, New York City. Some see the positives and negatives in this exchange, but often the homeland questions the cultural authenticity of the migrants. In salsa music, the same occurs. The Puerto Ricans question the validity and authenticity of the music. Today, salsa music has expanded to incorporate the sounds of Africa, Cuba, and other Latin American countries, creating more of a salsa fusion. In addition, with the second and third generations of Nuyoricans, the new debated and diasporic sound is hip hop. With hip hop, Nuyoricans gave back to Puerto Rico with rappers like Vico C and Big Pun, who created music that people in both New York and Puerto Rico could relate to and identify with. Other notable Puerto Ricans who made contributions to hip-hop were DJ Disco Wiz, Prince Whipper Whip, DJ Charlie Chase, Tony Touch, DJ Johnny "Juice" Rosado (Public Enemy/producer), Tego Calderon, Fat Joe, Jim Jones, N.O.R.E., Joell Ortiz, and Lloyd Banks. Currently, groups like Circa '95 (PattyDukes & RephStar) are continuing the traditions as torchbearers of the Nuyorican hip hop movement. Thus the musical relationship between the United States and Puerto Rico has become a circular exchange and blended fusion, as embodied in the name Nuyorican.

== Playwrights and theater companies ==
Spanish-language Puerto Rican writers such as René Marqués who wrote about the immigrant experience can be considered as antecedents of Nuyorican movement. Marqués's best-known play The Oxcart (La Carreta) traces the life of a Puerto Rican family who moved from the countryside to San Juan and then to New York, only to realize that they would rather live a poor life in Puerto Rico than face discrimination in the United States. Puerto Rican actress Míriam Colón founded The Puerto Rican Traveling Theatre in 1967 precisely after a successful run of The Oxcart. Her company gives young actors the opportunity to participate in its productions. Some of PRTT's productions, such as Edward Gallardo's Simpson Street concern life in a New York's ghettos. Other theater companies include Pregones Theater, established in 1979 in the Bronx and currently directed by Rosalba Rolón, Alvan Colón-Lespier, and Jorge Merced.

Playwrights who pioneered the Nuyorican movement include Pedro Pietri, Miguel Piñero, Giannina Braschi, Jesús Papoleto Meléndez, and Tato Laviera. Piñero is the acclaimed playwright with Short Eyes, a drama about prison life which received a Tony Award nomination and won an Obie Award. Candido Tirado and Carmen Rivera, Obie Award-winner for her play La Gringa; and Judge Edwin Torres wrote Carlito's Way.

Currently, spaces such as B.A.A.D. (the Bronx Academy of Arts and Dance), established in 1998 by the dancer and choreographer Arthur Aviles and the writer Charles Rice-González in the Hunts Point neighborhood of the Bronx, provide numerous Nuyorican, Latina/o, and queer of color artists and writers with a space to present and develop their work. Other theater groups use the theaters at the Clemente Soto Vélez Cultural Center in Loisaida for their events.

== Visual arts ==
The Nuyorican movement has always included a strong visual arts component, including arts education. Raphael Montañez Ortiz, an important conceptual artist and activist, established El Museo del Barrio in 1969 as a way to promote Nuyorican art. Painters and print makers such as Rafael Tufiño, Fernando Salicrup, Marcos Dimas, and Nitza Tufiño established organizations such as Taller Boricua as a way of centering Puerto Rican artistic traditions. In photography, the group En Foco was instrumental in showcasing a distinctly Puerto Rican view of life in the U.S. and the island.

The 1970s and '80s were a key period for the rise of Nuyorican art. Graffiti-inspired artists such as Jean-Michel Basquiat and Al Diaz achieved great recognition for their work. Installationists Antonio Martorell and Pepon Osorio created environments that brought together traditional aesthetic practices with political and social concerns. Also significant was painter Juan Sánchez (b. 1954), who produced a body of work that acknowledged global struggle while remaining rooted in the Puerto Rican/Nuyorican experience. His paintings and prints are held in the collections of museums such as El Museo del Barrio, the Whitney Museum of American Art and the Metropolitan Museum of Art.

The era saw collaborations across cultural genres. Writers and poets such as Sandra María Esteves and Nicholasa Mohr alternated and complemented their prose and lyrical compositions with visual images on paper. At other times, experimental artists such as Adál Maldonado (also known as Adál) collaborated with poets such as Pedro Pietri. During this time, the gay Chinese American painter Martin Wong collaborated with his lover, Miguel Piñero; one of their collaborations is owned by the Metropolitan Museum of Art.

A newer generation of artists has likewise continued to explore Puerto Rican themes in their work. Among them are painters, muralists and conceptual artists such as James De La Vega, Jorge Zeno, Miguel Luciano, Miguelangel Ruiz, Sofia Maldonado and Soraida Martinez. Gallerists, curators, and museum directors such as Marvette Pérez, Yasmin Ramírez, Deborah Cullen, Susana Torruella Leval, Judith Escalona, Tanya Torres, and Chino Garcia have helped Puerto Rican and Nuyorican art gain recognition.

== Nuyorican writers and poets ==
- Miguel Algarín, co-founder of Nuyorican Poet's Cafe
- Jack Agüeros
- Giannina Braschi, author of the postmodern classics Empire of Dreams, Yo-Yo Boing! and United States of Banana
- Julia de Burgos, author of Puerto Rican poetry classic "Yo misma fui mi ruta"
- Jesús Colón
- Victor Hernández Cruz
- Nelson Denis
- Sandra María Esteves
- Tato Laviera
- Felipe Luciano
- Jesús Papoleto Meléndez
- Nancy Mercado
- Nicholasa Mohr
- Richie Narvaez
- Pedro Pietri, best known for "Puerto Rican Obituary," poet laureate of the Nuyorican movement
- Miguel Piñero, co-founder of Nuyorican Poet's Cafe best known for the play Short Eyes
- Noel Quiñones
- Bimbo Rivas
- Charles Rice-González
- Abraham Rodriguez
- Bonafide Rojas
- Esmeralda Santiago, author of When I Was Puerto Rican
- Piri Thomas, author of Down These Mean Streets
- Edwin Torres (judge), author of Carlito's Way
- J. L. Torres, author of The Accidental Native and Boricua Passport
- Luz María Umpierre
- Edgardo Vega Yunqué (also Ed Vega), author of The Lamentable Journey of Omaha Bigelow into the Impenetrable Loisaida Jungle

== In popular culture ==
- The life of Nuyorcan movement poet Miguel Piñero was portrayed in the 2001 Hollywood production Piñero, directed by Leon Ichaso and starring Benjamin Bratt in the title role. In the film, Piñero's love life, with both men and women, is depicted, including with his protégé Reinaldo Povod. The relationships are secondary to the life of the writer as an individual, as the movie shows a non-chronological portrayal of Piñero's development as both a poet and a person. The movie blends visual and audio segments shot in short, music/slam poetry videos with typical movie narratives to show Piñero's poetics in action.

== See also ==
- Puerto Rican migration to New York City
- Culture of New York City
- List of Puerto Ricans
- Puerto Rican Literature
