= Nancy Mercado =

Puerto Rico writer

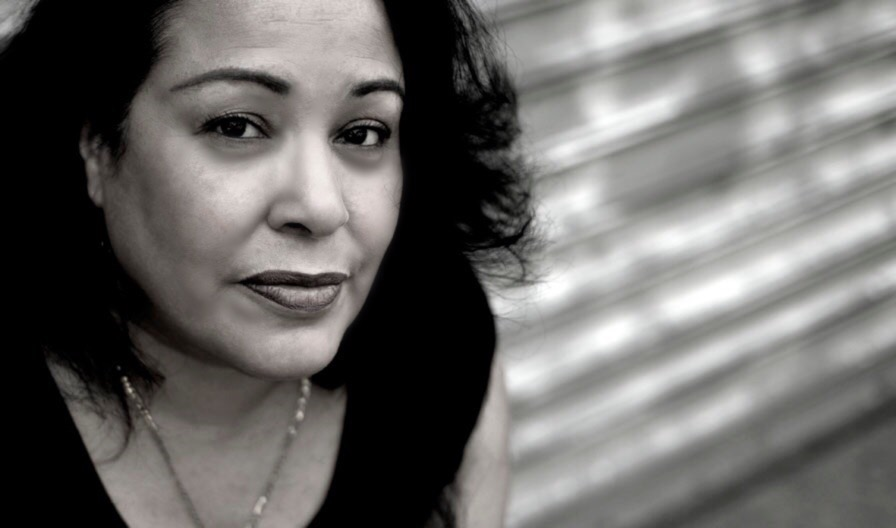
- Born: December 1959 (age 66)
- Education: Binghamton University- SUNY (PhD) New York University (M.A.) Rutgers University–New Brunswick (B.A.)
- Occupations: Writer, poet, activist
- Writing career
- Notable awards: American Book Award for Lifetime Achievement (2017); The Frederick Douglass 200 (2019)
- Movements: Post Beat; Nuyorican; Postmodernism
- Website: nancy-mercado.com

Nancy Mercado (born December 1959) is an American writer, editor, educator and activist; her work focuses on issues of injustice, the environment, and the Puerto Rican and Latino experience in the United States. She forms part of the Nuyorican Movement, a literary genre which arose from the Beat Movement.

== Life and education ==
Mercado was born and raised in Atlantic City, New Jersey. She received a B.A. from Rutgers, the State University of New Jersey in 1982, with a double major in art/art history and Puerto Rican Studies, and her M.A. from New York University in Liberal Studies with a concentration in script writing and Cinema Studies (1989). In 1989 she was accepted into the School of Drama at Yale University but had to leave toward the end of the first semester due to her financial situation. Her doctoral degree was awarded in 2004 in English literature, with a concentration in creative writing, from Binghamton University.

== Career ==
Mercado began her literary career in 1979; as such, some consider her to be part of the second wave of writers who constitute the Nuyorican literary movement. Of her work, Dr. Marilyn Kiss writes, "if the personal is political, then such verses as, "He was forgotten/before he could be remembered/by the heads of state/he provided sugar for," written about her grandfather, Don Portolo, "Director of the Sugar Cane Field Workers", and "Milla can speak of/The turn of the century land reforms,/Of the blinded enthusiasm/For a man called Marín..." about her grandmother, Milla, and "Juanita, Providing food from soil,/Creating homes from ashes,/Teaching tolerance by living..." about her aunt in Puerto Rico, offer testimony to the power of this type of poetic vision."

Mercado's book of poems; It Concerns the Madness (Long Shot Productions), was published in 2000. In 2005 she served on the editorial board for a special issue of Letras Femeninas; a publication of the Asociación Internacional De Literatura Femenina Hispánica, Department of Languages and Literature, Arizona State University. Latino Leaders Magazine's 2007 issue profiled her as "one of the most celebrated members of the Puerto Rican literary movement in the Big Apple."

In 2011 Mercado was guest editor of phati’tude Literary Magazine's winter issue ¿What's in a Nombre? Writing Latin@ Identity in America.

Mercado's film, video and radio features include the 1990s Poetry Spots video series directed by Bob Holman, the documentary film, Yari, Yari Pamberi Black Women Writers Dissenting Globalization directed by Jayne Cortez, the 2011 PBS NewsHour documentary special; America Remembers 9/11. and, National Public Radio's, The Talk of the Nation program; Subdued Reflection On Sept. 11 Anniversary in 2012.

== Bibliography ==
=== Books ===
- Las Tres Hermanas... children's coloring book. New York City: Casita Maria, 2017
- Nuyorican Writers Anthology. Editor. New York City: Centro, Hunter College City University of New York, 2015
- It Concerns the Madness. Hoboken: Long Shot Productions, 2000. ISBN 0965473856
- if the world were mine... the young writer's workshop anthology. Editor. Newark: New Jersey Performing Arts Center Publication and United Way of Essex and West Hudson, 2003.

=== One-act plays ===
- Palm Trees in the Snow (1989)
- Chillin (1990)
- Forever Earth (1991)
- It is I; Stay Alive! (1992)
- Planet Earth (1993)
- Alicia in Projectland, coauthored with Pedro Pietri (1994)
- AWAY (1996)

=== Essays ===
- "Ser o no ser Nuyorican." La Ventana. Havana, Cuba: Casa de las Americas, 2014.
- "About Face: My Brief Journey as a Female Puerto Rican Poet." Gare Maritime. Nantes, France: Maison de la Poesie, 2000.
- "AIDS in My World." Not in My Family: AIDS in the African American Community. Editor. Gil L. Robertson IV. Los Angeles, California: Agate Publishers, 2006. ISBN 1932841245
- "Miguel Piñero." (Biographical entry.) The Encyclopedia of Hispanic-American Literature. Editor. Luz Elena Ramírez. New York: Facts on File, 2009.
- "Youth Performance Workshops Reach Students in Elizabeth." Resource. Newark, NJ: New Jersey Performing Arts Center Publication, 1996.
