= Tato Laviera =

Puerto Rican writer

- Born: Jesús Abraham Laviera Sánchez; May 9, 1950; Santurce, Puerto Rico
- Died: November 1, 2013 (aged 63); Manhattan, New York
- Occupations: Poet, playwright
- Writing career
- Notable works: La Carreta Made a U-Turn, Enclave, AmeRican, Mainstream Ethics
- Movement: Nuyorican

Jesús Abraham "Tato" Laviera (May 9, 1950 – November 1, 2013) was a Puerto Rican poet in the United States. Born Jesús Laviera Sanches, in Santurce, Puerto Rico, he moved to New York City at the age of ten, with his family, to reside on the Lower East Side. Throughout his life he was involved in various human rights organizations, but was best known as a renowned Nuyorican poet. An obituary for NBC Latino describes him as "one of the greatest representatives of the Nuyorican movement."

== Early years and education ==
Laviera was born in Santurce, Puerto Rico, and moved to the Lower East Side of Manhattan in New York City in 1960 with his mother and siblings at the age of nine. He attended Catholic school in the United States where is teachers urged him to change his name to Abraham because they felt that Jesús was unfit for someone of Latino descent who did not understand English. As a result, he chose to go by the name "Tato", a nickname given by his brother. After graduating high school in 1968, he studied at Cornell University and later at Brooklyn College. However, he never received a degree from either school. Instead, he committed the majority of his time to social and community work. Laviera served as the director of University of the Streets, a nonprofit organization focused on providing educational opportunities for underprivileged individuals. Additionally, he was a director of the Hispanic Drama Workshop, and a creative writing professor at Rutgers University.

While still in Puerto Rico, his mother studied under Juan Boria, an acclaimed poet and performer who was inspired by Afro-Caribbean culture. This early exposure introduced him to the world of Puerto Rican poetry that he later infiltrated. Tato initially began writing as a means of reestablishing the name that was taken from him earlier in his life.

== Personal life ==
Laviera had a daughter, Ruth Ella, and a son, Che Malik, who died in 2005. He also had two grandchildren who are known as Kayden Gog, and Skye Gog. Tato suffered from diabetes, which caused a complications and interruptions in his work. In 2004, he was deemed legally blind due to complications with diabetes. He then revisited his passion for community work, working with the American Association for Diabetes, where his main initiative was promoting awareness representing Latinos who suffered from the disease. He even founded the Jesús A. Laviera One-Day with Diabetes Project which allowed him to incorporate his adoration for poetry. He hosted events during which poets could speak about how diabetes has affected their lives and offer support to the Hispanic community. Following some years of financial and health problems, Laviera fell into a diabetic coma. Shortly after he died, on November 1, 2013, at Mount Sinai Hospital in Manhattan.

== Career ==
Laviera began writing poems and jingles at a very young age. He claims this lead him to discover the "wealth of characters and attitudes" that poetry contains. Laviera's poetry, which is written sometimes in Spanish, sometimes in English, more often in Spanglish, addresses language, cultural identity, race, and memory, particularly as it affects the transcultural lives of Puerto Ricans in the United States. Laviera uses the sublets of each language to contribute to his rich symbolism and metaphor that are commonplace in his poetry. His mastery of both languages sets him apart from many Latino writers of his time. Tato claimed that the most important aspect of his poems is the title, explaining that "the words of the title are the ultimate essence." Laviera was keen on performing his works of poetry in front of audiences in a musical manner. Live recitation of poetry is an important aspect of the Nuyorican movement as it better portrays the spirit of the poems. Scholar William Luis describes Laviera's work as follows: "His poetry is full of the music of bomba and plena, and of rap and preaching. However, it is also socially minded and historical in content. Indeed, his poems are a conglomeration of voices, songs, dialects, and cultures producing a unique synthesis which is moving, instructive, and aesthetically appealing". Laviera prided himself in giving a voice to all of the people, cultures, and nations he represented through his poetry. Since he believed that he belonged equally to two nations, the United States and Puerto Rico, he opted to focus on the positives of biculturalism, rather than adverse aspects like some of his counterparts. Nicolás Kanellos's Hispanic Literature of the United States: A Comprehensive Reference describes him as "the inheritor of the Spanish oral tradition, with all of its classical formulas, and the African oral tradition, with its wedding to music and spirituality."

== Famous works ==
=== La Carreta Made a U-Turn (Houston: Arte Público Press, 1979) ===
This was his first major book of poetry and was a response to René Marques' La Carreta in which he details the story of a family who ends up returning to Puerto Rico after migrating to the United States in search of more opportunities and a better life but instead is faced with a disheartening reality. Laviera disputes this view and instead "picks up where Marques left off" and portrays a more accurate story of the Puerto Rican migrant in which they do not return to their homeland, which is based on historical data. La Carreta Made a U-Turn was extremely successful and received well by its readers. In fact, shortly after its publication Laviera was invited by President Jimmy Carter to an event at the White House for distinguished American poets.

=== Enclave (Houston: Arte Público Press, 1981) ===
In this poem, Laviera celebrates Puerto Rican heritage in New York. Unlike many of his other works which concentrate on larger scale events and take a collective perspective, Enclave is intentionally personal. Laviera focuses on the individual lives of those who inhabit the Puerto Rican enclave within New York. Tato celebrates the Puerto Rican-American experience, through his soulful and powerful songs. This poem was a recipient of the American Book Award of the Before Columbus Foundation. This collection focusses on the individual and delivers a gallery of portraits of the unconquerable people of the enclave, whose lives are brought forth via the rhythmic songs “en clave.”

=== Mainstream Ethics—Ética Corriente (Houston: Arte Público Press, 1988) ===
Mainstream Ethics is a poem which explores the place that Hispanics hold in the United States. Amidst a pressure to conform to he standards of the bustling Metropolis culture, Laviera emphasizes the importance of his own culture as a Puerto Rican American. From his perspective, he asserts that Hispanic culture, art, and language are transforming the United States, rather than falling victim to it. This poem serves as a message to encourage Hispanic Americans to hold fast to their culture of origin, and individual identities. This text explores the terrestrial and verbal imperatives of Hispanics in the United States. Mainstream Ethics affirms that Hispanic linguistics, folklore, art and past are transforming the national culture and identity of the United States. It is not the role of Hispanics to follow the commands of a norm, an elusive mainstream, but to instead remain faithful to their communal and distinct identities to both lay claim to mainstream territory and to disprove its existence.

=== AmeRícan (Houston: Arte Público Press, 1999) ===
In this poem, Laviera redefines his nationality and takes pride in being both a Puerto Rican and an American living in the United States. He establishes a new identity, called AmeRícan which is the harmonious blend of the two composed of "mainland and island traditions." Tato uses the pronoun 'we' to signify the collective experience of multiculturalism for the entire generation of Puerto Rican-Americans. The first section of this collection celebrates the range of various traditions and cultures making up the American people. It is a plea for an end to prejudice. The latter two sections of the collection are built on the motifs of ethnic exchange and the place of the boriqueño in that greater scheme.

=== Mixturao and Other Poems (Houston: Arte Público Press, 2008–09) ===
One of Tato Laviera's distinguishing characteristics is his celebrations of the diverse languages that exist within America. This poetry collection combines English and Spanish to celebrate the author's bilingual and bi-cultural background as well as the growing representation of these dynamics in the United States. Various sections of this collection discuss gender, borders, and cultural folklore. He also rights about the sense of alienation that immigrants often suffer from as they can feel isolated from their native and adopted cultures. His usage of language allows readers to get a grasp of his own dual cultural identity.

== Honors and achievements ==
=== 1982 American Book Awards ===
Honored for his book of poetry, Enclave

Tato Laviera Theatre

One year after his death, his legacy was honored by the New York arts community when the Taino Towers housing complex, his last place of residence, renamed its Red Carpet Theatre for him.

== Archives ==
The Tato Laviera Papers are held at the Archives of the Puerto Rican Diaspora Centro de Estudios Puertorriqueños, Hunter College, CUNY. The collection "provides insight into Laviera's life and career, as well as into the Nuyorican poetry movement, of which he was an early member. Consists of correspondence, manuscripts, typescripts, notebooks, press clippings, articles, flyers, event programs, posters, photographs, and audio and video recordings."

== See also ==
- List of Puerto Rican writers
- List of Puerto Ricans
- Puerto Rican literature
- Latino Poetry
