= Jesús Papoleto Meléndez =

American poet

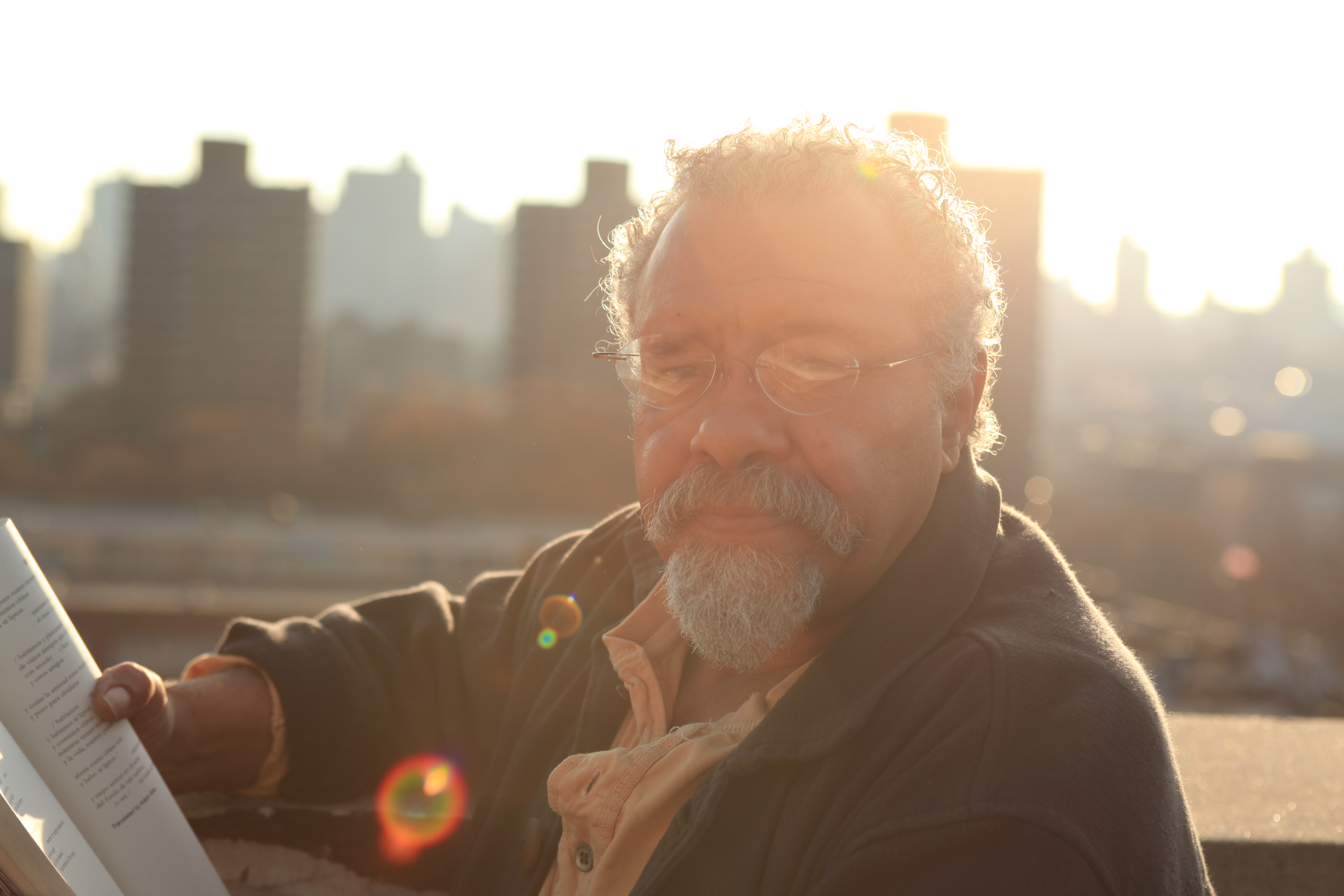
- Born: June 13, 1950 (age 76)
- Occupation: Poet

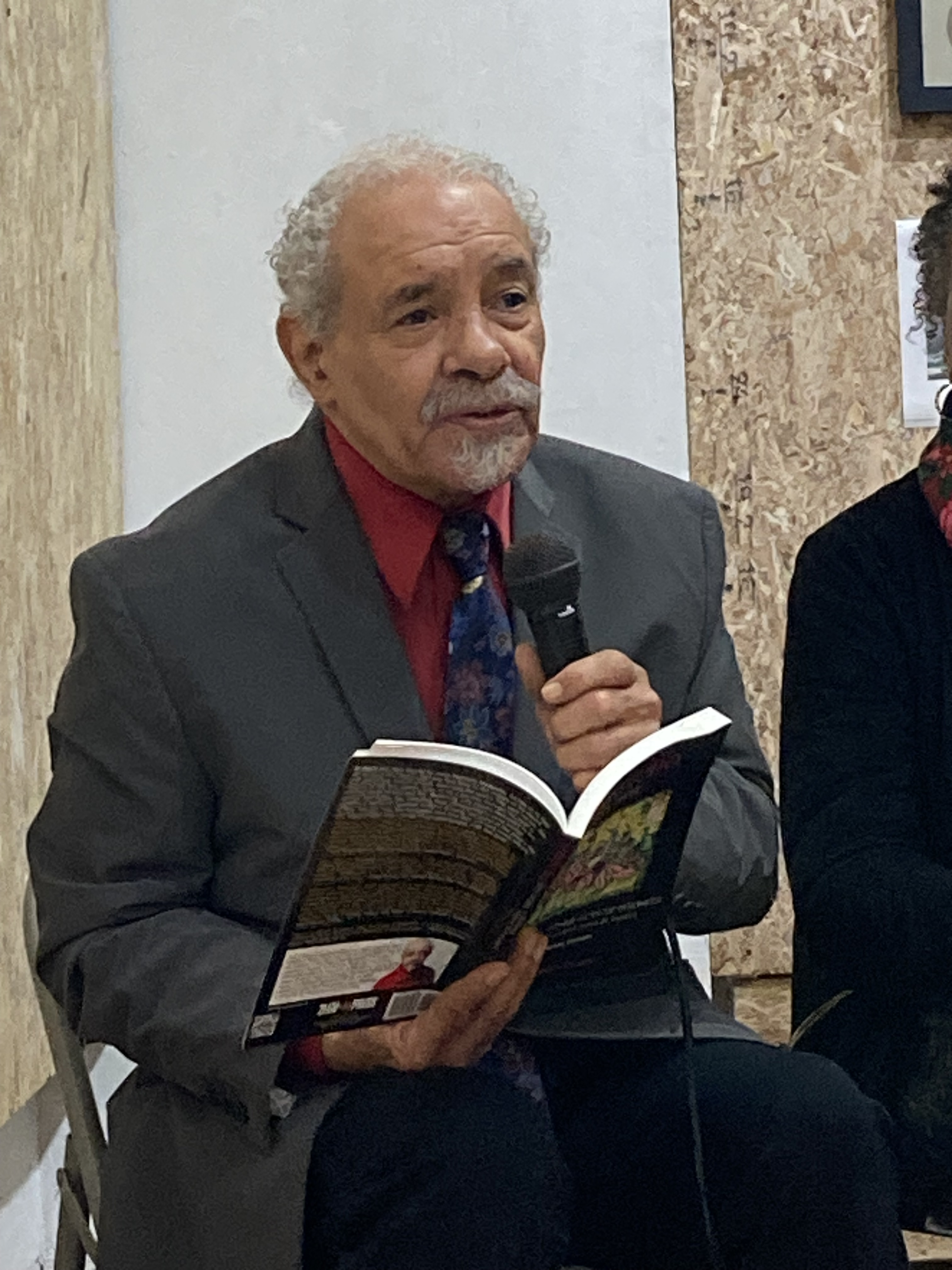
Jesus Papoleto Melendez reading poetry at WhiteBox New York.

Jesús Papoleto Meléndez, also known as "Papo", or "Papoleto", (born June 13, 1950) is a New York-born Puerto Rican poet, playwright, teacher, and activist. He is a member of the Nuyorican Movement. He grew up during the Civil Rights Movement, Black Power movement, and the emergence of the Nuyorican Movement in East Harlem. His titles include the play The Junkies Stole the Clock (1974), and Hey Yo/Yo Soy! 40 Years of Nuyorican Street Poetry.

== Personal life ==
Meléndez's upbringing had a large influence on his work. Living in East Harlem, much of his experiences came from the influence his Southern African-American friends from the same area had on him. Meléndez was a close friend of Pedro Pietri, with whom he collaborated on a variety of projects. They started a group together known as the Latin Insomniacs Motorcycle Club Without Motorcycles with which he organized the first South Bronx Surrealist Festival.

Meléndez has been working in public schools as a teacher, introducing poetry for over 30 years, both in California and in New York.

== Poetry ==
Meléndez started writing poetry because he lacked the ability to draw.

Meléndez cites poets like Lawrence Ferlinghetti, who felt strongly that art should be accessible to all people, not just a handful of highly educated intellectuals, as a major influence. They also share common techniques such as cascadence, where the poems seem to jump off the page.

Meléndez cites early cartoons as one of his influences due to their use of imagery and exaggeration.

When Meléndez moved to the West Coast in his early years, he started a jazz poetry band in California named Exile Genius with Eugene Mingus and M'chaka Uba.

=== Nuyorican Poets Cafe ===
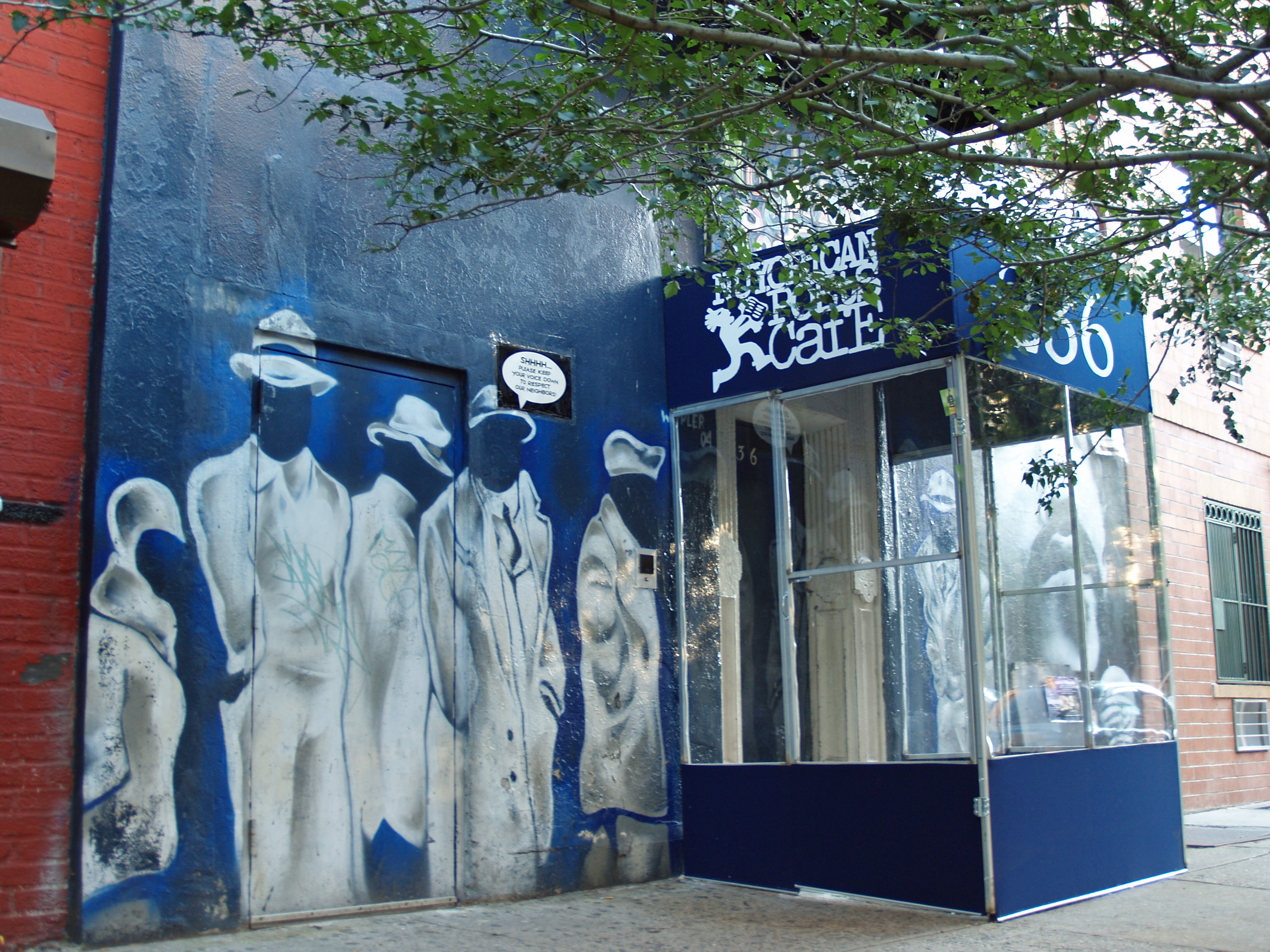
Nuyorican Poets Cafe

Along with many other poets such as Miguel Algarín, Richard August, Jorge Brandon, Pedro Pietri, and others, Meléndez helped found the Nuyorican Poets Café, which helped serve as a platform for many influential works spanning from literature, music, plays, and much more.

== Books and collections ==
Meléndez has published collections that include his work as a Nuyorican poet.

- Casting Long Shadows 1970
- Have You Seen Liberation? 1971
- Street poetry & Other Poems 1972
- Concertos on Market Street: Poems 1993
- Hey Yo! Yo Soy! 40 Years of Nuyorican Street Poetry, A Bilingual Edition2012
- PAPOLiTICO Poems of a Political Persuasion2018

== Awards ==
To date, Meléndez has received the Artist for Community Enrichment Award (ACE) from the Bronx Council on the Arts in 1995, New York Foundation for the Arts Fellowship in Poetry in 2001, The Louis Reyes Rivera Lifetime Achievement Award in 2004, the Universes Poetic Ensemble Company Award in Appreciation of Inspiration & Commitment to the Development of the Company and the 1st Annual "El Reverendo Pedro Pietri Hand Award" in poetry in 2006, and the Union Settlement Association "Innovation Award" in 2011.
