= Piñero =

2001 film by Leon Ichaso

- Promotional poster
- Directed by: Leon Ichaso
- Written by: Leon Ichaso
- Produced by: John Leguizamo; John Penotti; Tim Williams
- Starring: Benjamin Bratt
- Cinematography: Claudio Chea
- Edited by: David Tedeschi
- Music by: Kip Hanrahan
- Distributed by: Miramax Films
- Release date: December 13, 2001 (U.S.)
- Running time: 103 minutes
- Country: United States
- Language: English

Piñero is a 2001 American biopic about the troubled life of Nuyorican poet and playwright Miguel Piñero, starring Benjamin Bratt as the title character. It was written and directed by the Cuban filmmaker, Leon Ichaso, premiered at the Montreal World Film Festival on August 31, 2001, and then received a limited theatrical release in the United States on December 13, 2001.

== Cast ==
- Benjamin Bratt as Miguel Piñero
- Talisa Soto as Sugar
- Giancarlo Esposito as Miguel Algarin
- Rita Moreno as Miguel's mother
- Michael Irby as Reinaldo Povod
- Mandy Patinkin as Joseph Papp
- Griffin Dunne as Agent
- Ray Santiago as Willie
- O.L. Duke as Paul
- Fisher Stevens as Public Theater as Cashier
- Jaime Sánchez as Miguel's Father
- Tara Wilson as Tito's girlfriend
- Nelson Vasquez as Tito Goya
