= Bimbo Rivas =

Puerto Rican actor and writer (1939–1992)

"Bimbo" Rivas
- Born: Bittman John; 11 November 1939
- Died: 21 May 1992 (aged 52); New York City, New York
- Writing career
- Literary movement: Nuyorican

Bittman John "Bimbo" Rivas (November 11, 1939 – May 21, 1992) was a Puerto Rican actor, community activist, director, playwright, poet, and teacher who lived on the Lower East Side of Manhattan in New York City. He also served in the United States Air Force. He was one of the pioneers of the Nuyorican Movement and was involved in the Nuyorican Poets Café.

Based on his experiences, Rivas wrote the poem "Loisaida", coining the term that today gives the Lower East Side its nickname. On May 27, 1992, Avenue C became known as Loisaida Avenue.

Bimbo Rivas died at the age of 52 on May 21, 1992, after suffering a heart attack while substitute teaching a kindergarten class.

== Affiliations ==
- The Puerto Rican Traveling Theatre Co., Inc. New York, NY.
- The Lower East Side People’s Federal Credit Union, Loisaida, NYC, NY.
- Adopt-A-Building Inc, Loisaida, NYC, NY.
- El Bohio Cultural & Community Center, Loisaida, NYC, NY.
- The Public Theater, New York, NY US.
- El Teatro Ambulante—El Coco que Habla, Loisaida, NYC, NY.
- Nuyorican Poets Café, Loisaida, NYC, NY.
