= Sofia Maldonado =

Puerto Rican artist (born 1984)

- Born: 1984 (age 41–42); San Juan, Puerto Rico
- Education: Escuela de Artes Plásticas y Diseño de Puerto Rico
- Style: Surrealism

Sofia Maldonado (born 1984) is a Puerto Rican contemporary artist. She lives and works between New York City and Puerto Rico. Maldonado has collaborated with the Nuyorican Movement.

== Biography ==
Sofia Maldonado was born and raised in San Juan, Puerto Rico. Her love for art manifested at a very young age. It was at the Liga del Arte in Old San Juan where she took her first formal art classes. Later, she attended junior high and high school at Central High of Visual Arts in Santurce.

She received a BFA from the Escuela de Artes Plásticas (2006) in San Juan, a Master of Fine Arts from the Pratt Institute in 2008, and was a fellow at the Vermont Studio Center. In 2008, Maldonado exhibited at Queens Museum. In 2009 Maldonado created a large scale public art work with Real Art Ways in Hartford, Connecticut.

This artist, who splits her time between New York and Puerto Rico, is involved in numerous artistic and community projects. Maldonado was selected by the Times Square Alliance to create a mural on 42nd Street in Manhattan in 2010. Maldonado has created a large body of work including skateparks, murals, live painting performances, mixed media, and video. Her work is inspired by dilapidated structures of the Caribbean, the Latina female character, and urban subcultures. Due to her recognizable style, the director of the MAC Marianne Ramírez Aponte described her as among “the most well-known young artists in Puerto Rico, with an accelerated trajectory who puts forward the themes and work techniques of many emerging artists”.

Her work has been featured in solo exhibitions internationally, including Magnan Emrich, New York (2008), Witzenhausen Gallery, Amsterdam (2010), Museo de Arte Contemporáneo, Puerto Rico (2010), Magnan Metz Gallery, NY (2010), Ringling Museum, Sarasota (2011), and the University of Wisconsin, Madison (2011). Her works are held in the collections of the Museo de Bellas Artes in Cuba; the Museo de Arte Contemporáneo in San Juan, Puerto Rico; and Rockefeller Brothers, New York, among others.

== Book chapters and articles ==
- Fever : Tropical Nostalgias and Urban Anxieties in Sofia Maldonado (June 24, 2012).
- "Arts Innovator: Sofia Maldonado, Puerto Rico." Americas Quarterly (Fall 2009).
- Daley, Anna. "That's Not Us." Art21 Blog, April 5, 2010.
- Delgado, Cindy. "Sofia Maldonado: Beauty In Naughtiness." Rubyhornet April 29, 2010.
- McLendon, Matthew. Beyond Bling: Voices of Hip Hop in Art. Scala Publishers, 2011. ISBN 1-85759-697-8
- Morrison, Sarah. "Sofia Maldonado Gets Pretty/Hood in Times Square." (video and article) 80sPurple.
- Nogueras, Celina. Frescos: 50 Puerto Rican Artists under 35. Actar, 2011. ISBN 0-9815255-8-X
- Rivera, Raquel Z. "Sofia's Gatas / Las gatas de Sofía." Reggaetonica July 8, 2009.
- "Tropical Storm: Gowanus – Sofia Maldonado and Cre8tive YouTH*ink." (video) cre8tive YouTH*ink. June 13, 2011.
- "Vigoroso Letargo: Sofía Maldonado y Darren Brass hablarán hoy, a las 7:00 p.m., de historia y memoria en el MAC." El Nuevo Día, July 28, 2010.

== Solo exhibitions ==
- 2017

“Sofia Maldonado: Fem Trap” at Point Green

- 2013

Into Gray, Magnan Metz Gallery, New York, NY

- 2012

Fever: Tropical Nostalgias and Urban Anxieties in Sofia Maldonado, Museo Arte Contemporaneo de Puerto Rico Isaac Lincoln Gallery at Northern State University, Aberdeen, SD

- 2011

Disillusions, Studio Theater Gallery, Middlesex County College, Edison, NJ University of Wisconsin, Madison Cornell, Fine Arts Museum Rollins College, Winterpark, FL

- 2010

Concrete Jungle Divas, Magnan Metz Gallery, New York, NY Witzenhausen Gallery, Amsterdam, the Netherlands Times Square Alliance Mural Project, New York, NY CIRCA Puerto Rico, Magnan Metz Gallery, New York, NY

- 2009

Graffiti Gone Global (during Art Basel Miami), Sushi Samba, Miami, FL Taller Puertorriqueno, Philadelphia, PA Skate my Patria, part of the Tenth Havana Biennial, Havana, Cuba CIRCA Puerto Rico, Magnan Projects, New York, NY

- 2008

Pinta, Special Artist Project, New York, NY

- 2007

The Tropical Storm, Magnan Gallery New York, NY

- 2006

Sofia... en la isla, Galeria Candela San Juan, Puerto Rico

== Group exhibitions ==
- 2013

Wood in Contemporary Art, Craft & Design, Museum of Arts and Design, New York, NY

- 2012

Purple, Causey Contemporary, Brooklyn, NY Concrete Illusions: Public and Private Spaces in Puerto Rico: Exploring the urban dimensions of the Caribbean, La Galeria de IBA at the Villa Victoria Center for the Arts, Boston, MA

- 2011

The John and Mable Ringling Museum of Art, Sarasota, FL The (S) Files, El Museo Bienal, New York, NY

- 2010

Eames Inspirations, Barney, New York, NY Paper olls, M.I.S.S in association with Fifty24 Gallery, Los Angeles, CA

- 2009

"The Good, the Bad, & the Ugly", Queens museum of Art, New York Girl by Girls, SPacejunk Gallery, St. Maurice; Bayone; and Grenoble, France Hybridity, SOMArts Cultural Center, San Francisco, CA

- 2008

V Certamen de Pintura Diputacion de Castellon, Spain En Sus Marcuas, Instituto de Cultura Puertorriquena, Puerto Rico Younity: Heart and Soul, Alphabeta, Greenpoint, NY Graduate Show '08, Pratt Manhattan Gallery, NY MFA Exchange, Virginia Commonwealth, Richmond, VA

- 2007

M4 Design Project, Design District, Miami, FL Coca-Cola Graffiti Series, Museo de Arte de Puerto Rico, Santurce, Puerto Rico Hoy, Black Box Art Foundation, San Juan, Puerto Rico

- 2006

São Paulo - Sao Juan, (with Os Gemeos, Dzine & Cudy Hudson) Museo de Arte de Puerto Rico, Puerto Rico Paint Flash, Montana Gallery, Sevilla, Spain Returned Mail, Galeria Carlos Irizarry, San Juan, Puerto Rico

- 2005

Mural Painting, Galeria Comercial, Santurce, Puerto Rico Sofia, Cafe Seda, San Juan, Puerto Rico Nothing, Tag Rom, Rio Piedras, Puerto Rico Annual Exhibition, Escuela de Artes Plásticas, San Juan, Puerto Rico Juni, Bik, Sofia, Galeria Carlos Irizarry, Puerto Rico Papa Jac Collectable Series, Don Pablo, Puerto Rico

- 2004

Truck (at Luna St.), Sin Titulo Galeria de Arte Contemporaneo, San Juan, Puerto Rico

== Awards ==
- 2010

Rockefeller Brothers Fund an Times Square Alliance, public project, NY

- 2009

Cuban Artist Fund, studio program at Chashama, NY Vermont Studio Center, Vermont

Against the grain
