= Adál Maldonado =

Nuyorican photographer (1948–2020)

Adál Alberto Maldonado (November 1, 1948 – December 9, 2020), styled as ADÁL, was a photographer who lived and worked in New York City and Puerto Rico. Primarily a portrait photographer, his works focused on the concept of identity. He also worked on musical performances and installations. Maldonado is associated with the Nuyorican movement.

Maldonado was born in Utuado, Puerto Rico, on November 1, 1948. His family moved to Trenton, New Jersey, when he was 13, and then to the Bronx when he was 17.

Among Maldonado's works is a mixed-media installation and website titled El Puerto Rican Embassy (1994), developed in collaboration with Pedro Pietri. (According to Acosta-Belén and Santiago, the concept is due to Eduardo Figueroa.) For the project, Maldonado and Pietri created a Puerto Rican passport and named ambassadors for Puerto Rico. In another work titled Coconauts in Space (2016–2020) he used NASA archives to re-imagine the 1969 Apollo moon landing with a Puerto Rican protagonist.

== Publications ==
- Maldonado, Adál Alberto (1981). Falling Eyelids: A Foto Novela. Foto-graphic Editions. OCLC 81836794.
