= Pedro Pietri =

Puerto Rican writer (1944–2004)

- Pedro Pietri
- Born: March 21, 1944; Ponce, Puerto Rico
- Died: March 3, 2004 (aged 59); New York, NY
- Occupations: Poet, playwright
- Writing career
- Movement: Nuyorican Poets Cafe

Pedro Pietri (March 21, 1944 – March 3, 2004) was a Puerto Rican poet and playwright and one of the co-founders of the Nuyorican Movement. He was considered by some as the poet laureate of the Nuyorican Movement.

== Early years ==
Pietri was born in Ponce, Puerto Rico, however his family moved to New York City in 1947, when he was only three years old. They settled in the west side (Manhattanville) section of Manhattan where he and his siblings received their primary and secondary education. Pedro was greatly influenced by his aunt, who often recited poetry and on occasions put on theatrical plays in the First Spanish Methodist church in El Barrio. Pietri himself started to write poems as a student at Haaren High School. After graduating from high school, Pietri worked in a variety of jobs until he was drafted into the Army and sent to fight in the Vietnam War. The experiences that he faced in the Army and Vietnam, plus the discrimination that he witnessed while growing up in New York, were to become the main factors that would forge his personality and style of poetry.

== "Puerto Rican Obituary" ==
Upon his discharge from the Army, Pietri affiliated himself with a Puerto Rican Civil Rights activist group called the Young Lords. In 1969, he read for the first time his poem, "Puerto Rican Obituary". The New York Times obituary of Pedro Pietri noted that the poem "sketched the lives of five Puerto Ricans who came to the United States with dreams that remained unfulfilled. By turns angry, heartbreaking and hopeful, it was embraced by young Puerto Ricans, who were imbued with a sense of pride and nationalism." Fellow Puerto Rican poet of the Nuyorican Movement Giannina Braschi, who performed with Pedro Pietri, pays homage to "Puerto Rican Obituary" and his sites his own obituary in her novel "United States of Banana." "Puerto Rican Obituary" is an epic poem published in 1973 by Monthly Review Press and widely considered Pietri's greatest work.

== Nuyorican Poets Café ==
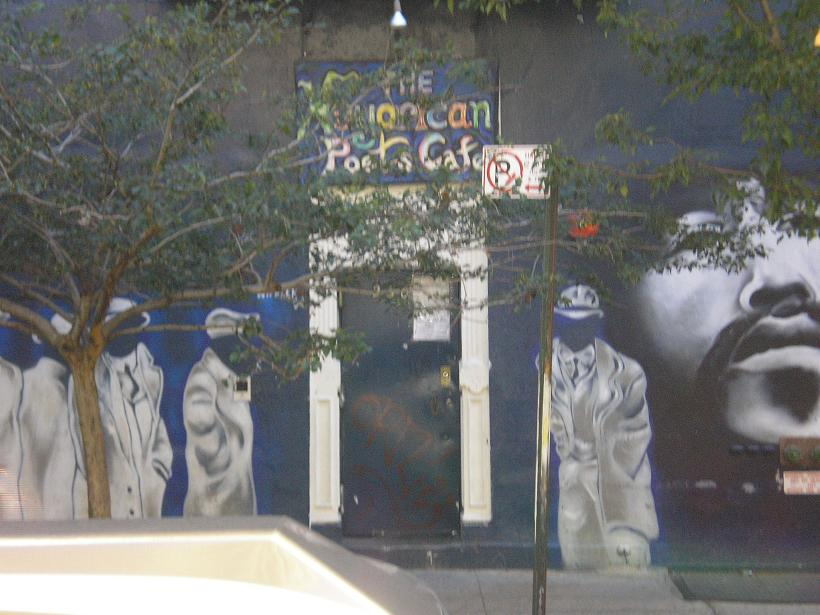
Nuyorican Poets Cafe, Photo: Shankbone

Pietri helped found the Nuyorican Movement together with Miguel Algarin, Miguel Piñero and Lucky Cienfuegos also founders of the Nuyorican Poets Cafe. The Café is an institution where many New York Puerto Rican and Latino artists perform. Pietri wrote the play El Puerto Rican Embassy. The theme was that an island, which was neither an independent nation nor a state of the United States, should have an embassy. The idea for the play came from Pietri's nationalistic views. During the performance, he would sing "The Spanglish National Anthem" and hand out simulated "Puerto Rican passports" prepared in collaboration with Adál Maldonado.

== Other works ==
Among his other works are: Invisible Poetry (1979), Traffic (1980), Plays (1982), Traffic Violations (1983), and The Masses are Asses (1988). His writings have been published and included in the following anthologies: Inventing a Word: An Anthology of Twentieth Century Puerto Rican Poetry (ed. Julio Marzan, 1980), Illusions of a Revolving Door (1984), The Outlaw Bible of American Poetry (ed. Alan Kaufman, S.A. Griffin, 1999), The Prentice Hall Anthology of Latino Literature (ed. Eduardo del Rio, 2002) and many others. In August 2015, City Lights released Pedro Pietri: Selected Poetry, which gathers the most enduring and treasured work from his books—Puerto Rican Obituary, Traffic Violations, and Out of Order—and contains a generous selection of his previously unpublished writings.

Pietri not only wrote poetry but also recorded it. In 1979, Pietri came out with an LP entitled Loose Joints and later One Is a Crowd which were produced by Folkways Records., also recorded ! Aqui se Habla Español ! Pedro Peitri en casa Puerto Rico on discos Coqui LP 1203

It was during this time that Pietri was part of the Cultural Council Foundation CETA Artists Project in New York City, which ran from 1978 to 1980. He worked with other poets and literary artists like Bob Holman, Nathan Whiting and N.H. Pritchard.

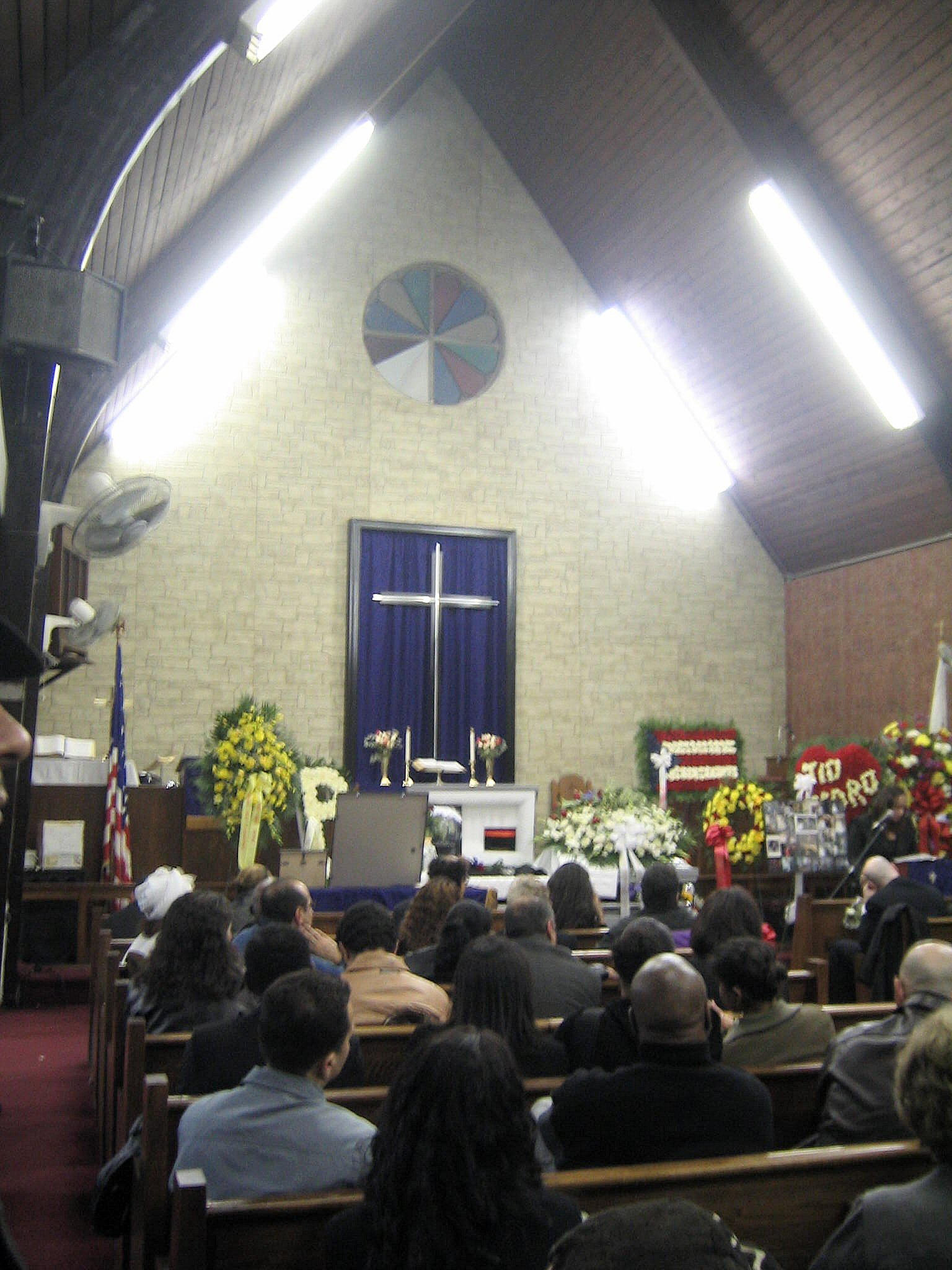
Funeral held at historic First Spanish Methodist Church of East Harlem

Pietri was a free spirit whose performances were nontraditional. In his irreverence toward religion, he called himself Reverend, dressed in black and walked around with a large collapsible cross. In reaction to the romanticism of the community by groups like the Young Lords and others on the left, he wrote that "The Masses are Asses." In the first published collection of Nuyorican poetry (Nuyorican Poetry: An Anthology of Puerto Rican Words and Feelings edited by Miguel Algarín and Miguel Piñero in 1975), his contribution was a poem consisting entirely of punctuation marks. He would throw condoms at audiences during some of his performances. He was a nonconformist, constantly reminding the Movement of the importance of tolerance, intellectual freedom and not losing its humanity. His was a unique voice, both in substance and style, to which failed attempts by all to imitate his reading of his "Puerto Rican Obituary" out loud readily attest.

The Pedro Pietri Papers, held at the Centro, Center for Puerto Rican Studies, City University of New York, "chronicle the extraordinarily creative, productive, and at times, anarchic life of one of the most original and innovative contemporary writers of the Puerto Rican community. They lend insight into the vast scope of Pietri’s literary interests and endeavors, his collaborative relationships with other writers and his editorial process."

== Later years ==
Pietri was diagnosed with stomach cancer in 2003. He went to Mexico to receive an alternative treatment for a year. On March 3, 2004, Pietri died en route from Mexico to New York. Funeral services were held in East Harlem at the historic First Spanish Methodist Church, which was taken over in 1969 by the Young Lords and renamed at the time as "The First People's Church" to provide free breakfast and other programs to the poor and working people of El Barrio. This is where, fittingly, Pietri first read in public his classic poem, "Puerto Rican Obituary", in support of the Lords' takeover of the church.

== See also ==
- Corsican immigration to Puerto Rico
- List of Puerto Rican writers
- Puerto Rican literature
- Miguel Piñero, co-founder of Nuyorican Poets Cafe and of its literary movement
- Giannina Braschi, leading lady of Nuyorican culture and author of Spanglish novel Yo-Yo Boing!
- Miguel Algarín, founder of Nuyorican Poets Cafe and co-founder of its literary movement
- Braschi's Empire of Dreams
