= Urayoán Noel =

American poet

- Born: April 12, 1976 (age 50); San Juan, Puerto Rico
- Occupation: Poet

Academic background
- Education: New York University; Stanford University; University of Puerto Rico

Academic work
- Institutions: New York University

Urayoán Noel is a translator, poet, and critic who is the author of poetry collections, poetry criticism and books. He has received fellowships from the Ford Foundation, the Bronx Council on the Arts, the Howard Foundation, and CantoMundo (where Noel has been both fellow and faculty).

== Early life and education ==
Originally from San Juan, Puerto Rico, he has a PhD (Spanish) from New York University, 2008; an M.A. (Spanish) from Stanford University, 1999; and a B.A. (English) from Universidad de Puerto Rico.

== Career ==
Noel is an associate professor of English and Spanish at NYU. In addition, he is a contributing editor at Obsidian: Literature and Arts in the African Diaspora, NACLA Report on the Americas, and Mandorla: New Writing from the Americas.

Noel's poetry and criticism is widely published. His work appears in Bomb, Contemporary Literature, Lana Turner, Latino Studies, Small Axe Project, CENTRO: Journal of the Center for Puerto Rican Studies, Revista de Estudios Hispánicos, Liminalities: A Journal of Performance Studies, American Literary History, and Comparative Literature Studies.

Noel is the author of several poetry collections, including his debut collection Kool Logic/La lógica kool, Boringkén, Hi-Density Politics, and Buzzing Hemisphere/Rumor Hemisférico, focused on the "promotion of hemispheric politics and poetics, along with its interrogation of technology's structural and narrative interventions into diasporic cultures." Critic Kristin Dykstra notes that "Taken collectively the books produce a historic meditation that collides with, and intensifies, the frenetic energies emphasizing the immediacy of urban life." Noel's poetry has been honored with a Library Journal Top Fall Indie Poetry selection and a National Book Critics Circle Small Press Highlights selection.

The author's work as both editor and critic has received numerous plaudits. 2014's In Visible Movement: Nuyorican Poetry from the Sixties to Slam was the winner of the 2015/2016 Best Book Award from the Latino Studies Section of the Latin American Studies Association and received an honorable mention in the MLA Prize in Latina/o and Chicana/o Literary and Cultural Studies. Noel edited and translated Pablo de Rokha's Architecture of Dispersed Life: Selected Poetry (Shearsman Books, 2018). This book was later longlisted for the Best Translated Book Award, sponsored by Open Letter Books at the University of Rochester.

== Personal life ==
Noel lives in the Bronx where he was awarded a BRIO fellowship from the Bronx Council on the Arts.

== Selected bibliography ==
Poetry
Title	Publisher	Year of Publication
Kool Logic/La lógica kool	Bilingual Review Press	2005
Boringkén	Librería La Tertulia / Ediciones Callejón	2008
Hi-Density Politics	BlazeVOX Books	2010
Buzzing Hemisphere/Rumor Hemisférico	University of Arizona Press	2015

Criticism
Title	Publisher	Year of Publication
In Visible Movement: Nuyorican Poetry from the Sixties to Slam	University of Iowa Press	2014

Editor
Title	Publisher	Year of Publication
Architecture of Dispersed Life: Selected Poetry (Pablo de Rokha (Author), Urayoan Noel (Translator))	Shearsman Books	2018

Selected Publications
Title	Publisher	Year of Publication	Notes
Diasporic Avant-Gardes: Experimental Poetics and Cultural Displacement (edited by Carrie Noland, Barrett Watten)	Palgrave Macmillan	2009	Features Noel's essay, "From Spanglish to "Glossolalia: Edwin Torres’s Nuyo-Futurist Utopia"
Performing Poetry: Body, Place and Rhythm in the Poetry Performance. (Thamyris/Intersecting: Place, Sex and Race) (edited by Arturo Casas, Cornelia Grabner)	Rodopi	2011	Features Noel's essay, "The Body's Territories: Performance Poetry in Contemporary Puerto Rico."
Avenues of Translation: The City in Iberian and Latin American Writing (edited by Regina Galasso, Evelyn Scaramella)	Bucknell University Press	2019	Features Noel's essay, "litoral translation traducción litoral"

== Selected poems ==
Death and Taxesfrom Kool Logic (Bilingual Press/Editorial Bilingüe, 2005)

In the Faraway Suburbsfrom Kool Logic (Bilingual Press/Editorial Bilingüe, 2005)

ode to coffee oda al caféfrom PoetryNow(2016)

No Longer Odefrom Poem-a-Dayon August 13, 2018, by the Academy of American Poets.
