= Reinaldo Povod =

American dramatist

Reinaldo Povod (1960 - July 30, 1994 Brooklyn) was an American playwright.

== Life ==
Reinaldo Povod, known to his friends as Rei (Ray) grew up on the Lower East Side. The son of a Puerto Rican mother and a Cuban father of Russian descent. In 1977, his play Cries and Shouts played at the Nuyorican Poets Café, where Mr. Povod was a protege of Miguel Piñero. Bill Hart brought Mr. Povod to the attention of Joseph Papp, who invited him to become a resident playwright at the Public Theater. In 1986, Cuba and His Teddy Bear opened on Broadway, with Robert De Niro in the lead, for which Mr. Povod received the George Oppenheimer/Newsday Award (The Oppy). In 2009, Cuba and His Teddy Bear received its Chicago premiere by the Urban Theater Company and People's Theater of Chicago. Reinaldo Povod co-authored the play Super Fishbowl Sunday with longtime friend and collaborator Richard Barbour, which was produced in 2001 at the Krane Theater in Manhattan, directed by Mr. Barbour. The play Super Fishbowl Sunday has since been adapted into a screenplay by Richard Barbour and Joseph Barbour and is in pre-production at Bergen Street Ent.

Mr. Povod died at the age of 34 from TB and complications from AIDS.

== Works ==
- Cries and Shouts
- Cuba and His Teddy Bear. Samuel French, Inc. 1986. ISBN 978-0-573-69028-0.
- La Puta Vida Trilogy (This Bitch of a Life). S. French, Inc. 1987. ISBN 9780573662041.
- Nijinsky Choked His Chicken, 1987
- Poppa Dio!
- South of Tomorrow
- Super Fishbowl Sunday
- A Brownsville Archipelago
- Miami Vice "Everybody's in Showbiz"

== Awards ==
- 1987 Whiting Award
