= Miguel Piñero =

Puerto Rican writer (1946–1988)

- Born: Miguel Antonio Gómez Piñero; December 19, 1946; Gurabo, Puerto Rico
- Died: June 16, 1988 (aged 41); New York City, New York, U.S.
- Occupations: Playwright, actor
- Spouse: Juanita Lovette Ramirez (1977–1979)
- Partner: Martin Wong
- Children: 1
- Writing career
- Notable work: Short Eyes
- Notable awards: New York Critics Circle Award, Obie Award, Drama Desk Award
- Movement: Nuyorican Poets Café

Miguel Piñero (December 19, 1946 – June 16, 1988) was a Puerto Rican playwright, actor and co-founder of the Nuyorican Poets Café. He was a leading member of the Nuyorican literary movement.

== Early years ==
Piñero was born on December 19, 1946, in Gurabo, Puerto Rico, to Miguel Angel Gómez Ramos and Adelina Piñero. In 1950, when Miguel was four, he moved with his parents and sister Elizabeth to Loisaida (or Lower East Side) in New York City. His father abandoned the family in 1954 when his mother was pregnant with their fifth child. His mother then moved into a basement and began receiving welfare. He attended four different schools, three public and one parochial. He would steal food for his family to eat. His first of many criminal convictions came at the age of eleven, for theft. He was sent to the Juvenile Detention Center in the Bronx, and to Otisville State Training School for Boys. He joined a street gang called "The Dragons" when he was 13; when he was 14, he was hustling in the streets.

He moved to Brooklyn, where he and three other friends committed robberies (according to Piñero, more than 100), until they were caught at a jewelry store. He was sent to Rikers Island in 1964. After this, he joined the Job Corps, and was sent to Camp Kilmer for training. It turned out the opportunity was, as Piñero put it, "Dope City, Skag Town." He returned to New York City and became affiliated with the Young Lords, a group similar to the Black Panthers. He was back in Rikers for drug possession not long after, and spent time at Phoenix House. After his second stint at Rikers, his mother sent him to Manhattan State Hospital, where he would receive his high-school equivalency diploma.

== Short Eyes ==
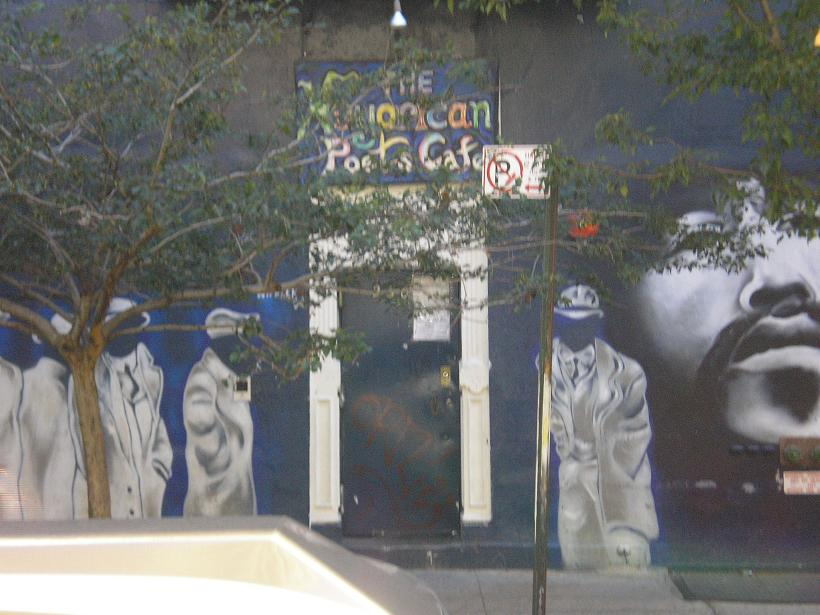
Nuyorican Poets Cafe

In 1972, when Piñero was 25 years old, he was incarcerated in Sing Sing prison for second-degree armed robbery. His first literary work was Black Woman with a Blonde Wig On. Marvin Felix Camillo, the director of The Family, an acting troupe made up of ex-cons, submitted the poem to a contest, which it won. The warden of Sing Sing then became concerned that "contraband" was being taken from the prison and nearly put Camillo in jail after seeing an article in the newspaper. While serving time in prison, Piñero wrote the play Short Eyes as part of the inmates' playwriting workshop. Mel Gussow came to see it, and due to his review in The New York Times, the director of the Theater at Riverside Church wanted Piñero to present it there.

When Piñero was released from Sing Sing on parole in 1973, he was able to present Short Eyes with The Family. The title comes from the prison slang term for child molestation. The play is a drama based on his experiences in prison and portrays how a house of detention populated primarily by Black and Latino inmates is affected by the incarceration there of a white pedophile, considered the lowest form of prison life. In 1974, the play was presented at Riverside Church in Manhattan. Theater impresario Joseph Papp saw the play and was so impressed that he moved the production to Broadway. It went from Riverside Church, then to The Public Theater, eventually to Vivian Beaumont Theater. The play was nominated for six Tony Awards. It won the New York Drama Critics Circle Award and an Obie Award for the "best play of the year". The play was also a success in Europe. The play catapulted Piñero to literary fame. Short Eyes was published in book form by the editorial house Hill & Wang. It became the first play written by a Puerto Rican playwright to be put on Broadway.

== Nuyorican Poets Café ==
External audio
- You may listen to Miguel Piñero's "Lower east side" on YouTube.

In the 1970s, Piñero co-founded the Nuyorican Poets Café with a group of artists including Pedro Pietri and Miguel Algarín, who would become his closest friends. The Café is a place for performance of poetry about the experience of being a Nuyorican or Puerto Rican in New York.

== Television and films ==
In 1977, Piñero's play Short Eyes was turned into a film directed by Robert M. Young and Piñero played the part of "Go-Go," a prisoner.

While on set, he and Tito Goya were arrested for armed robbery and were arraigned in the same building where they were filming. The charges were dropped, but some thought Piñero had a "need" to go back to prison. The following year, Piñero was arrested and charged with armed robbery, but those charges were also dropped when state Supreme Court Judge Peter J. McQuillan ruled that the evidence against him and two other men was inadmissible in court, because there was no justifiable cause for the arrest.

In subsequent years, Piñero would land supporting roles in such films as The Jericho Mile (1979), Times Square (1980), Fort Apache, The Bronx (1981), Breathless (1983), Deal of the Century (1983), and Alphabet City (1984). Piñero was considered a talented writer who described the evils of society, even though he continued to be a drug addict. Piñero wrote the Baretta TV episode "The Gadjo" in 1978 and acted in the episode "Por Nada" in 1977. He played the part of drug lord Esteban Calderone in two episodes of the TV series Miami Vice in 1984 and drug cartel boss Esteban Revilla in another episode in 1985, as well as writing the 1984 episode "Smuggler's Blues". He also wrote the screenplay for the 1977 film Short Eyes. In 1985, Pinero returned to Miami Vice, appearing in Season II, as the drug lord Revilla.

== Writing career ==
His next play, Sideshow (1974), which would be a shorter version of Playland Blues (1980), and follows street kids as they decide to put on their own play about a social worker placing difficult teenagers in various living situations and their attempts to adapt.

He followed that with a one-act play titled The Guntower, premiered at the 1976 New York Shakespeare Festival. Instead of following prisoners, like in Short Eyes, this one is about two guards in the watchtower. In that same year was The Sun Always Shines for the Cool (1976) which follows the lives of players, operators, drug dealers, and thieves as they come together in a bar owned by a man named Justice.

In 1975, he moved to Philadelphia to star in Bruce Jay Friedman's Steambath as God. Eulogy for a Small-Time Thief (1977) was set in his new hometown. It regards a small-time thief who does not really know his place in the world and thinks he can manipulate it to his liking.

He wrote two one-act plays, Paper Toilet and Cold Beer, around 1979. The former is set in a subway men's room and involves a series of events framed by the voice of a man asking for toilet paper from inside a stall. The latter examines the role of the dramatist and writer through an alter-ego protagonist.

== Later years ==
Piñero played an important role in acquainting his writing partner and erstwhile lover, the Chinese-American gay artist Martin Wong, with the Lower East Side, becoming a benefactor at a time when Wong found it difficult to meet his rent. Several of Wong's paintings are illustrations of poems given to him by Piñero. "The Annunciation According to Mikey Piñero (Cupcake and Paco)" (1984) pictures a scene from Short Eyes.

Miguel Piñero died on June 16, 1988, in New York City from cirrhosis. Piñero's ashes were scattered across the Lower East Side of Manhattan, as he asked in his 1985 "Lower East Side Poem". The homage to his beloved neighborhood concluded:

Just once before I die

I want to climb up on a
tenement sky
to dream my lungs out till
I cry
then scatter my ashes thru

the Lower East Side....

Leading up to his death, he was working with Papp on a new play to premiere at the New York Shakespeare Festival. Every Form of Refuge Has Its Price, his unfinished piece, is set in an intensive care unit. He also had another unfinished play, The Cinderella Ballroom.

Typescripts for Piñero's The Guntower and All Junkies are in the Billy Rose Theatre Collection at the New York Public Library for the Performing Arts.

== Legacy ==
The life of Miguel Piñero was portrayed in the 2001 Hollywood production Piñero, directed by Leon Ichaso and starring Benjamin Bratt as Piñero. In the film, Piñero's love life is displayed, ranging from his interactions with men and women, including his protégé Reinaldo Povod. The relationships are secondary to the life of the writer as an individual, as the movie shows a non-chronological portrayal of Piñero's development as both a poet and a person. The movie blends visual and audio segments shot in short, music/slam poetry videos with typical movie narratives to show Piñero's poetics in action.

The poems "January In Motion" and "The Bronx 1979" by Neil Raymond Ricco were written for Pińero.

In 2022, Piñero was featured in the book 50 Key Figures in Queer US Theatre, with a profile written by theatre scholar Karen Jaime.

== Awards and nominations ==
Awards

- 1974 Drama Desk Award, Outstanding New Playwright
- 1974 New York Drama Critics' Circle Award, Best American Play
- 1974 Obie Award, Best American Play
- 1982 Guggenheim Fellowship in Drama and Performance Art

Nominations

- 1975 Tony Award for Best Play

Pinero was inducted into the New York Writers Hall of Fame in 2013.

== Work ==
=== Filmography ===
- Kojak (1977, TV Series) – Rudy
- Looking Up (1977) – Mugger
- Short Eyes (1977) – Go-Go
- The Jericho Mile (1979, TV Movie) – Rubio
- The Streets of L.A. (1979, TV Movie) – 2nd Duster
- Times Square (1980) – Roberto
- See China and Die (1981, TV Movie) – Gonzalez
- Fort Apache, The Bronx (1981) – Hernando
- Exposed (1983) – Man in the Street (New York)
- Breathless (1983) – Carlito
- Deal of the Century (1983) – Molino
- Miami Vice (1984–1985, TV Series) – Esteban Calderone / Esteban Revilla
- Alphabet City (1984) – Dealer
- Almost You (1985) – Ralph
- The Equalizer (1985, TV series) - Super - "Lady Cop"
- D.C. Cops (1986, TV Movie) – Pablo
- The Equalizer (1986) - Drunk - "Counterfire"

=== Plays ===
- All Junkies (1973)
- Straight from the Ghetto (1973)
- Short Eyes (1974)
- Sideshow (1974)
- The Guntower (1976)
- The Sun Always Shines for the Cool (1976)
- Eulogy for a Small Time Thief (1977)
- Paper Toilet (1979)
- Cold Beer (1979)
- NuYorican Nights at the Stanton Street Social Club (1980)
- Playland Blues (1980)
- Midnight Moon at the Greasy Spoon (1981)

== See also ==
- List of Afro-Latinos
- List of Puerto Ricans
- List of Puerto Rican writers
- Puerto Rican literature
- Pedro Pietri, co-founder of Nuyorican Poetry movement
- Miguel Algarín, co-founder of Nuyorican Poet's Cafe
- Latino literature
- Latino theatre in the United States

== Bibliography ==
- Short Eyes, 1975. New York: Hill and Wang. ISBN 0-8090-8659-X and ISBN 0-8090-1232-4 (paperback)
- La Bodega Sold Dreams, 1985. Houston: Arte Público Press. ISBN 0-934770-02-6
- The sun always shines for the cool; A midnight moon at the Greasy Spoon; Eulogy for a small time thief, 1984. Houston : Arte Público Press. ISBN 0-934770-25-5
- Outrageous: One Act Plays, 1986. Houston: Arte Público Press. ISBN 0-934770-68-9
- Nuyorican Poetry: An Anthology of Puerto Rican Words and Feelings, (co-editor, with Miguel Algarín)
- Roger S. Platizky. "Human Vision in Miguel Piñero's Short Eyes." Americas Review. 19. Spring 1991. pp. 83–91. Ariel Ruiz.
