= Miguel Algarín =

Puerto Rican poet (1941–2020)

Miguel Algarín Jr.
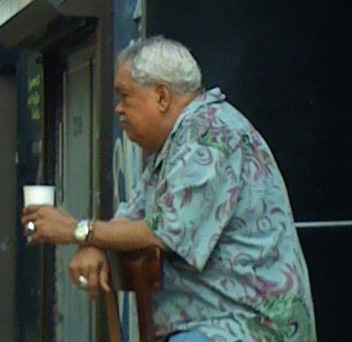
- Born: 11 September 1941; Santurce, San Juan, Puerto Rico
- Died: 30 November 2020 (aged 79); New York City, U.S.
- Education: University of Wisconsin (BA); Pennsylvania State University (MA); Rutgers University (PhD)
- Occupations: Poet; scholar; editor; playwright; translator
- Writing career
- Notable awards: American Book Award (1980, 1985, 1994); Larry Leon Hamlin Producer's Award; American Book Award for Lifetime Achievement; Obie Award
- Literary movement: Nuyorican

Miguel Algarín Jr. (11 September 1941 – 30 November 2020) was a Puerto Rican poet, writer, co-founder of the Nuyorican Poets Café, and a Rutgers University professor of English.

== Early years ==
Algarín was born in Santurce, Puerto Rico, and grew up in a culturally rich household that fostered a deep appreciation for the arts. In 1950, he and his family migrated to the Lower East Side of Manhattan in New York City, where he completed both his primary and secondary education. Algarín then pursued his studies in English, earning a B.A. from the University of Wisconsin in 1963 and an M.A. from Pennsylvania State University in 1965. He later obtained his Ph.D. in comparative literature from Rutgers University. While teaching English at Brooklyn College and New York University, Algarín developed a profound love for the works of Shakespeare. The timeless tales of Shakespeare inspired him to create a space where he could share the stories of his own community. Eventually, he became a professor of Shakespeare, creative writing, and United States ethnic literature at Rutgers University.

In 1973, Algarín began hosting gatherings for poets and artists in the living room of his Manhattan apartment. By 1975, the number of attendees had grown significantly, prompting him to seek a more suitable venue for these creative gatherings.

== Nuyorican Poets Café ==
After some time of hosting poets in his apartment, Algarín, Miguel Piñero, Pedro Pietri, and other poets rented a location on East 6th street and named it the Nuyorican Poets Café. In 1980, Algarín purchased a building on East 3rd street to expand the café. The Café is now a non-profit organization that offers programs which include poetry and prose readings, theatrical and musical performances, and visual arts exhibits. It is one of the key cultural institutions of the Nuyorican Movement. The Nuyorican Poets Cafe popularized slam poetry.

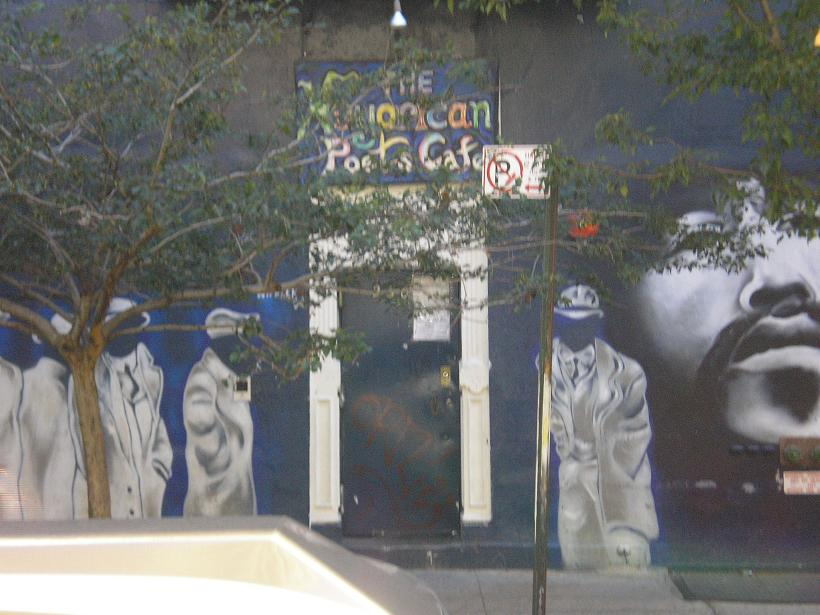
Nuyorican Poets Café. Photo: Shankbone

The theater has won over 30 "AUDELCO Awards" and was honored with an Obie grant for excellence in theater. Of the screenplays read in the theater, 40 have been turned into films. The Latin jam session which is celebrated at the Café has been a weekly "Critics Choice" at the New York Press for six consecutive years. The Café also has a radio broadcast on WBAI, where Algarín started the broadcast with his signature "We're live from the Nuyorican Poets Café".

Algarín played an important role in the spread of Nuyorican literature by compiling, with Miguel Piñero, its first anthology Nuyorican Poetry: An Anthology of Puerto Rican Words and Feelings. He also founded a publishing house called the Nuyorican Press, which only published one book, his own Mongo Affair. He also helped launch Arte Public Press, which became a leading publishing house for Nuyorican works.

Principally known as a poet, Algarín's books include Mongo Affair, On Call (1980), Body Bee Calling from the 21st Century (1982), Time's Now/Ya es tiempo (1985), and Love Is Hard Work: Memorias de Loisaida/Poems (1997, Lower East Side Memories/Poems). He also published anthologies of works that were performed at the Nuyorican Poets Café, including Aloud: Voices from the Nuyorican Poets Café (1994) which he co-edited with Bob Holman. He was the editor of Action: The Nuyorican Café Theatre Festival and co-editor of Aloud. Among his award-winning poetry books are Time's Now/Ya Es Tiempo and Love is Hard Work.

== Honors ==
Algarín held the status of Professor Emeritus for his more than 30 years of service to Rutgers University. He has received three American Book Awards and the Larry Leon Hamlin Producer's Award at the 2001 National Black Festival. In the movie Piñero, about the life of Miguel Piñero, directed by Leon Ichaso and starring Benjamin Bratt, Algarín is portrayed by the actor Giancarlo Esposito. Algarín received three American Book Awards and became the first Latino to win the Before Columbus Lifetime Achievement American Book Award in 2009.

== Later years ==
Algarín retired as professor from Rutgers University, but continued as the executive producer of the Nuyorican Poets Café's theater and was working on a piece of literature titled "Dirty Beauty". In 2001, he was portrayed by actor Giancarlo Esposito in the Miguel Piñero biopic Piñero.

== Death ==
Algarín died from sepsis at a hospital in Manhattan on 30 November 2020, at age 79.

== Works ==
- Mongo affair: poems. Nuyorican Poet's Café. 1978. ISBN 978-0-934770-04-0
- On call. Arte Público Press, Revista chicano-riqueña, University of Houston. 1980. ISBN 978-0-934770-03-3.
- Body bee calling from the 21st century. Arte Publico Press. 1982. ISBN 978-0-934770-17-0.
- Time's Now/Ya Es Tiempo. Arte Publico Press. 1985. ISBN 978-0-934770-33-0.
- Love is hard work: memorias de Loisaida. Scribner. 1997. ISBN 978-0-684-82517-5.
- Action. Touchstone. 1997. ISBN 978-0-684-82611-0
- Survival Supervivencia. Arte Publico Press. 2009. ISBN 978-1-611-92299-8

=== Editor ===
- Miguel Algarín; Miguel Piñero, eds. (1975). Nuyorican Poetry: An Anthology of Puerto Rican Words and Feelings. Morrow. ISBN 978-0-688-02967-8.
- Miguel Algarín; Bob Holman, eds. (1994). Aloud: Voices from the Nuyorican Poets Café. Macmillan. ISBN 978-0-8050-3257-4.
- Miguel Algarín; Lois Griffith, eds. (1997). Action: The Nuyorican Poets Café Theater Festival. Simon and Schuster. ISBN 978-0-684-82611-0. "Miguel Algarín."

== See also ==
- List of Afro-Latinos
- List of Latin American writers
- List of Puerto Rican writers
- List of Puerto Ricans
- Puerto Rican literature
- Multi-Ethnic Literature of the United States
- Before Columbus Foundation
- Miguel Piñero, co-founder of Nuyorican Poetry movement
- Giannina Braschi, author of Spanglish novel, Yo-Yo Boing!
- Pedro Pietri, co-founder of Nuyorican Poets Café
