= Lauren O'Connell =

American singer-songwriter

- Born: Lauren O'Connell; December 10, 1988 (age 37); Rochester, New York
- Genres: Indie folk, indie rock, alternative country
- Occupations: Singer-songwriter, musician
- Instruments: Vocals, guitar, banjo, bass, drums, piano, harmonica
- Years active: 2005-present
- Website: www.laurenoconnell.com

Lauren O'Connell (born December 10, 1988) is an American singer/songwriter, multi-instrumentalist and producer from Rochester, New York. They (Note: O'Connell is genderqueer and uses they/them pronouns.) have independently released six solo albums, and two EPs as a duo with Nataly Dawn under the group name My Terrible Friend.

== Early life ==
Lauren O'Connell was born in Rochester, New York on December 10, 1988. They began playing guitar at the age of twelve and wrote their first song by the age of fifteen. Their early performing experience came from playing open mic nights with their high school friend, Julia Nunes. In 2007, O'Connell went to Saxon Recording in Rochester at the suggestion of a friend and recorded their debut album Sitting in Chairs with engineer Dave Anderson. They recorded the entire album in one day, using single takes of each song.

Shortly after releasing Sitting in Chairs, O'Connell began attending Binghamton University. Throughout their first year they continued to write and perform. They began uploading videos of their original songs to YouTube so that they could share them with their friends from Rochester, including Nunes. Nunes made videos as well and garnered an unexpected following, and her videos led audiences to find O'Connell's work. O'Connell's first videos were simple one-takes of original songs with guitar and voice, but they soon progressed to include cover songs with layered harmonies and accompaniment, usually with O'Connell playing all of the instruments themselves. Though they generally use traditional instruments in their songs, O'Connell has sometimes used unconventional means when recording, including wine glasses, a metal tool cabinet, kicks to a garage door, a tennis racket covered in change, and a deck of playing cards. In late 2008, they decided to leave school and pursue music full-time.

== Career ==
Shortly after leaving school, O'Connell began recording their follow-up album The Shakes, which was released in early 2009.

During the summer of 2009, O'Connell met Jack Conte and Nataly Dawn of Pomplamoose when they came to New York to produce Nunes' I Think You Know EP. In 2010, O'Connell moved to Sonoma County, CA where they moved into a house with Conte and Dawn. A few months after moving to California, O'Connell and Dawn began a collaboration called My Terrible Friend. The duo recorded an EP titled Room for Ghosts in their home studio and released it on July 7, 2010. On July 20, 2010, O'Connell and Dawn were featured on the YouTube homepage for Music Tuesday, both individually and as My Terrible Friend.

Though O'Connell's fanbase was initially centered on the local area where they performed, their YouTube presence exposed their music to a much wider audience. On November 8, 2009, they played with Pomplamoose at the wedding of Take That member Mark Owen and English actress Emma Ferguson in Cawdor Church, Scotland. Ferguson, a fan of Rufus Wainwright, discovered Nataly Dawn's cover of Wainwright's song "Cigarettes and Chocolate Milk" and invited Dawn to play the song at the wedding. They then discovered Pomplamoose and O'Connell and Dawn's "The Daylight Here" and invited Conte and O'Connell to play as well.

In September 2010 O'Connell was chosen as the West Regional Winner of the 2010 Mountain Stage Newsong Contest. On October 22, 2010, they joined eleven other finalists from across America and Canada at Arts World Financial Center's Wintergarden in New York City for the Award Round performance competition and an opportunity to record an EP with Grammy winning producer Jacquire King.

During this time, Aaron Celentano and Jeff Marini provided bass and drums for local shows.

On December 14, 2010, O'Connell announced that they were raising money to record a new album and were working with Pledgemusic in order to give fans an opportunity to help fund studio time, with the goal of being in the studio sometime in January 2011. In return for pledging O'Connell decided to include personalized merchandise ranging from autographed CDs and T-shirts, handwritten lyrics, and hand-drawn artwork to house concerts, their personal iPod filled with music, and even grocery shopping or mini-golf with the pledger when they come to their city for a show. The project was set for a sixty-day pledge period, however, fan pledges exceeded the target amount in the first 24 hours, making it the fastest Pledgemusic project ever to reach its goal at the time. One week later they added more of the incentives that sold out quickly as well as new incentives like the harmonicas they used for their videos and albums, a Photoshop vacation photo with the pledger, and a volleyball painted with the pledger's face in the style of "Wilson" from the movie Cast Away, joking that their New Year's resolution was to make progressively weirder arts and crafts. The project raised 268% of the original goal by the time it concluded on February 14, 2011.

== Personal life ==
In March 2022, O'Connell came out as genderqueer and switched to they/them pronouns.

== Discography ==
=== Sitting in Chairs ===
O'Connell's debut album was recorded at Saxon Recording in Rochester, New York in early 2007. Sitting in Chairs was recorded in just one day, single-tracked with an acoustic guitar.

Track List

1. Sitting in Chairs
2. Levers and Gears
3. Good Intentions
4. My Equations
5. I'm All Talk
6. Chimney Smoke
7. Just Be
8. All the Perching Crows
9. Somewhere in Between
10. There Will Be

=== The Shakes ===
O'Connell's second album was recorded in late 2008 in Rochester, New York at GFI Music. It was released in early 2009. Unlike their previous album, The Shakes features accompaniment, including drums, horns, strings, and piano.

Track List

1. From Chambers, Slow
2. Chicken Wire
3. The Pilot
4. Things I Panic About
5. I Don't Mind
6. Bystander
7. Oncoming Traffic
8. 1988
9. Sweet Lament
10. Tangled Up Kites

=== Room for Ghosts ===
In the summer of 2010 O'Connell collaborated with their roommate Nataly Dawn of Pomplamoose and the duo released Room for Ghosts as My Terrible Friend in July 2010. The five track EP was recorded in their home studio and includes three original songs, as well as covers of "Diamonds and Gold" by Tom Waits and "Holy Roller Novocaine" by Kings of Leon.

Track list

1. When I Decide
2. Diamonds and Gold
3. Holy Roller Novocaine
4. The Daylight Here
5. Dying to Live

=== Quitters ===
On January 25, 2012, O'Connell announced via their website that they would be releasing a new album on March 2. Quitters was produced by O'Connell and engineered & mixed by Oz Fritz at Prairie Sun Studios in Cotati, California.

Track list

1. Every Space
2. I Will Burn You Down
3. I Belong To You
4. Things Are Alright
5. If Found/Gravity
6. What Breaks (and What Doesn't)
7. Maybe True Stories
8. The Same Things
9. In The Next Room
10. White Noise

=== Covers ===
In 2012, O'Connell compiled eleven songs they had released on YouTube into their album Covers, featuring songs originally performed by Bruce Springsteen, Warren Zevon, the Everly Brothers and others, as well as two traditional American songs. Their rendition of "All I Have to Do Is Dream" was featured on The Good Wife and "House of the Rising Sun" was featured in television promos for American Horror Story's third season, Coven.

Track list

1. All I Have to Do Is Dream
2. Dancing in the Dark
3. Little Maggie
4. The Way I Feel Inside
5. Peacebone
6. Roland the Headless Thompson Gunner
7. The One I Love is Gone
8. Other People (feat. Will Sturgeon)
9. Don't Think Twice, It's All Right
10. House of the Rising Sun

=== I Tried to Be Kind ===
On October 10, 2017, O'Connell released I Tried to Be Kind.

Track list

1. Grave Miscalculation
2. Almost Gone
3. Proving You Right
4. If You Knew
5. Professor
6. Switch

=== Details ===
On February 9, 2018, O'Connell released their fourth original album Details, an effort fan-funded via Kickstarter. The album was produced by Olivia Lee and O'Connell, and featured Lee as a guitarist as well as drummer Lauren Grubb and bassist Josh Fossgreen. It was mixed by Ian Pellicci and Beau Sorenson and mastered by T.W. Walsh. O'Connell published a companion essay for the album in which they shared experiences of mental health that informed some of the songs on the album.

Track list

1. Superimposed
2. Moon Hang Low
3. In on the Joke
4. Shimmering Silver
5. Guilt
6. Rest Easy
7. Out of Focus
8. Under Control
9. Knowing Her Name
10. Build Yourself

=== Covers Two ===
On August 25, 2020, O'Connell released their second collection of cover songs, entitled Covers Two, featuring covers of songs by Big Star, Gillian Welch, the Magnetic Fields, Iris Dement and others.

Track list

1. Thirteen
2. Laminated Cat
3. Ruination Day, Pt. II
4. I Hear Them All
5. Hungry Heart
6. Our Town
7. I Fall to Pieces
8. Kola
9. Atlantic City
10. Heart of Gold
11. I Don't Want to Get Over You

=== Covers Three ===
O'Connell's third album of covers, Covers Three, was released on September 20, 2021. It features covers of Vampire Weekend, Guided by Voices, and The Supremes, among others.

==== Track list ====
1. If I Needed You
2. Unbelievers
3. Graceland
4. Where Did Our Love Go
5. I Only Want To Be With You
6. Neighborhood #1 (Tunnels)
7. Game of Pricks
8. The Killing Moon
9. Lost Cause
10. The One I Love
11. I Think It's Going to Rain Today

=== Everything Feels Ridiculous ===
O'Connell released their fifth original album Everything Feels Ridiculous on October 6, 2023. The tracks Joangeline, I Wanna Be Your Man, Verona, Power Out, Framingham, and Horsefly were released as singles in the lead-up to the album.

==== Track list ====
1. Power Out
2. Framingham
3. Joangeline
4. Horsefly
5. Jacket?
6. I Wanna Be Your Man
7. Far Between
8. Verona
9. Anyway It's Not That Bad
10. Know You
11. Approach Me Now
12. Everything Feels Ridiculous
