= The Branson School =

Prep school in Ross, California, US

Coordinates: 37°57′56″N 122°33′57″W

- 39 Fernhill Avenue; Ross, California; United States

Information
- Type: Independent, College-prep
- Motto: Be Brave
- Established: 1920
- CEEB code: 052695
- Principal: Christina K. Mazzola
- Faculty: 101
- Grades: 9–12
- Enrollment: 420
- Average class size: 17 students
- Student to teacher ratio: 8:1
- Campus: Suburban, 17 acres (0.069 km^{2})
- Colors: Blue and Green ( and )
- Mascot: Bulls
- Website: http://www.branson.org

The Branson School (also known as Branson, Branson School, or KBS) is a co-educational college-preparatory high school for students in grades 9–12. The school has 420 students, and is located in Ross, California, 11 miles (18 km) north of San Francisco.

== History ==
In 1916, a group of 15 families in Marin County, California, pooled resources to start a local private school. The Little Gray School was finished in 1917. It began as a coeducational primary school, for students in grades 1–4. In 1918 it added intermediate and upper levels, both of which were limited to girls, and was renamed the San Rafael School for Girls.

Portrait of school's namesake, headmistress Katharine Fleming Branson

In April 1920, the school's trustees appointed two co-headmistresses, Katharine Fleming Branson and her sister Laura Elizabeth Branson. The elder of the two sisters, Katharine Fleming Branson, was Associate Director of Studies at the Beard School in Orange, New Jersey. Laura Elizabeth Branson was a teacher of mathematics and science at The Shipley School in Bryn Mawr, Pennsylvania, and had formerly served as head of the Department of Mathematics at Rosemary Hall in Greenwich, Connecticut. Both sisters were cum laude graduates of Bryn Mawr College.

Branson girls raking leaves in front of the Residential Hall in the 1950s

A former student has alleged that the school condoned teacher and student relationships. There was also a law firm report that illustrated the permissive culture of the school. The school initially seemed to take the investigation seriously. The actual report that named four sex offenders sparked an investigation at University High School where the coach Randy Taylor was employed after Branson.

=== Coeducation ===
The division of the two schools by gender started to become obsolete by the 1980s, as the two schools shared faculty, trustees, and curriculum. In July 1985, The Katharine Branson School and the Mount Tamalpais School were merged as a coeducational private day school, The Branson School.

== Campus facilities ==
Facilities include the Student Commons, an LEED Platinum-certified common area for students, and the Rand Center, a learning resource for students; the center is dedicated to Allen Rand.

== Notable alumni ==
- Kate Courtney - professional mountain biker and world champion
- Julia Child ('30) - chef, television personality, and author of Mastering the Art of French Cooking
- Edie Sedgwick ('56) - socialite, actress, model, and 'It' girl of 1965
- Hans Baldauf ('77) - architect
- Michael Froman ('80) - President, Council on Foreign Relations, lawyer and politician, served as the U.S. Trade Representative from 2013 to 2017.
- Elisabeth Leamy ('85) - television journalist, author and speaker, best known for her on-air work as Consumer Correspondent for ABC's Good Morning America.
- Tony Hsieh ('91) - internet entrepreneur and venture capitalist, CEO of Zappos
- Jennifer Siebel ('92) - documentary filmmaker and actress, director, writer and producer of the film Miss Representation and First Partner of California
- Jonny Moseley ('93) - freestyle skier and television presenter, won gold medal in moguls at the 1998 Nagano Winter Olympic Games
- Jack Conte ('02) - CEO and co-founder of Patreon, and singer and instrumentalist in Pomplamoose
- Benjamin Breen ('03) – writer and American historian
- R. David Edelman ('03) - American policymaker and Special Assistant to President Barack Obama for Economic and Technology Policy
- Zio Ziegler ('06) - painter and muralist
- Javier Zamora ('08) - Salvadoran-American poet and activist and award-winning author of Solito: A Memoir
- Niki Prongos (attended) – college football offensive tackle for the Stanford Cardinal
