= Scary Pockets =

American funk musical collective

- Origin: Los Angeles, California, U.S.
- Genres: Funk
- Years active: 2017–present
- Labels: Pockets, Inc.
- Spinoffs: Scary Goldings
- Members: Jack Conte; Ryan Lerman
- Website: www.scarypocketsfunk.com

Scary Pockets is an American funk musical collective formed in Los Angeles, California in 2017. Founded and led by keyboardist Jack Conte and guitarist Ryan Lerman, the group is known for releasing weekly funk-oriented reinterpretations of popular songs featuring a rotating cast of session musicians and vocalists, attracting widespread online viewership and coverage in music media.

== History ==
Scary Pockets was founded in early 2017 by Jack Conte — the co-founder of Patreon and member of the band Pomplamoose — and Ryan Lerman, a Los Angeles–based guitarist and arranger. Conte and Lerman met while in high school at The Branson School.

Several years after co-founding Patreon, Conte had little time to play music anymore. The day after a dinner for Lerman's 30th birthday, Conte pitched the idea for Scary Pockets to Lerman. Lerman has said that the core of Scary Pockets was to "make the most amount of music in the least amount of time and have the most amount of fun". Conte envisioned Scary Pockets as "Postmodern Jukebox meets Vulfpeck".

The band’s first video, a funk cover of Ed Sheeran’s Shape of You, was published in March 2017 and helped establish their weekly release model. They began posting weekly recorded funk covers of popular songs to YouTube and other digital platforms, often completed in quick, live-in-studio sessions. It continued for several years and resulted in numerous albums compiling funk reinterpretations.

On December 11, 2023, Scary Pockets announced that they would stop releasing covers.

== Musical style and approach ==
Scary Pockets is known for its groove-oriented, funk-first reinterpretations of familiar pop, rock, and R&B songs. Reviews and features in music media describe the band’s arrangements as emphasizing live ensemble interplay, syncopated rhythms, and improvisational sensibilities rather than polished studio production. Their sessions often involved recording performances live in one room with minimal overdubs, capturing spontaneity and groove in the arrangements.

Scary Pockets’ model relied on a rotating lineup of vocalists and musicians from the Los Angeles session community. Over the course of their primary funk cover period, the collective collaborated with dozens of performers and instrumentalists, spanning hundreds of individual releases. During a 6-year period, Scary Pockets collaborated with 144 vocalists, 42 drummers, 31 guitarists, 30 bassists, 18 percussionists, 17 saxophonists, 16 keyboard players, 13 trumpeters, 11 trombonists, 10 organists, 7 synth players, 7 pianists, 2 wurlitzer players, 1 talkboxer, 1 vocoder player, and 1 banjo player.

== Reception ==
Scary Pockets attracted attention from major music publications for their high-profile collaborations and reinterpretations: In 2023, they collaborated with guitarist Joe Bonamassa and vocalist Joanna Jones for a funk reinterpretation of AC/DC’s "Back in Black." Music commentary podcast Switched on Pop discussed Scary Pockets’ work with vocalist Lizzy McAlpine, highlighting the group’s ability to infuse familiar material with fresh funk arrangements. All About Jazz profiled Scary Pockets and its collaborative projects, noting their dynamic presence in contemporary funk coverage.

Media coverage has generally emphasized Scary Pockets’ creative reinterpretations and productivity. Switched on Pop highlighted the collective’s ability to refresh familiar pop songs while accumulating millions of views online. Mainstream music outlets such as MusicRadar and Guitar World have noted the band’s reinterpretations and collaborations with established musicians.

== Discography ==
Scary Pockets have released numerous albums compiling their weekly funk covers. Many tracks from these albums were originally released as singles or videos on digital platforms prior to being collected into full releases.

=== Albums ===
- Scary Pockets (2017)
- Funk Walker (2017)
- Nu Funk (2017)
- Kitsch Funk (2018)
- Funk-ish (2018)
- Funk Ninja (2018)
- Star Funk (2018)
- Funk Box (2018)
- Humpty Funky (2018)
- Ups & Downs (2019)
- Colors (2019)
- Off Center (2019)
- Modern Art (2019)
- Sca Ryp Ock Ets (2019)
- Stick the Landing (2019)
- Cycles (2020)
- Find the Light (2020)
- Agoraphobia (2020)
- Technicolor Magic (2021)
- LIFE (2021)
- Windows (2021)
- Frisky Business (2021)
- Late Nights (2021)
- 2am Funk Dance Party (2022)
- Jeff (2022)
- Magic Hour (2022)
- Stank Face (2023)
- Pockets Presents: Swatkins! (2023)
- Pockets Presents: David Ryan Harris! (2023)
- Heat Check (2023)
- Electric Dreams and Cosmic Nightmares (2024)
