= Pamplemousse =

Pamplemousse can refer to:

- The Pamplemousse, a racehorse
- Pamplemousses District, a location on Mauritius
- Pomelo, a large citrus fruit known as 'pamplemousse' in French as spoken in France
- Grapefruit, a pomelo hybrid known by the name 'pamplemousse' in French as spoken in Quebec, Switzerland, and Belgium
- Frankie Pamplemousse, a cartoon character on The ZhuZhus
- "Pamplemousse", song by FKA Twigs on the mixtape Caprisongs (2022)

== See also ==
- Pomplamoose, a musical duo
  - Pomplamoose (album)
