= How I Knew Her =

Studio album by Nataly Dawn
- Released: February 12, 2013
- Genres: Folk; pop
- Length: 39:19
- Label: Nonesuch Records
- Producer: Jack Conte

Nataly Dawn chronology
How I Knew Her (2013)	Haze (2016)

How I Knew Her is the first solo studio album by American musician Nataly Dawn of the duo Pomplamoose, released on February 12, 2013, under Nonesuch Records. The album was funded by a Kickstarter campaign which raised over $100,000 and was produced by Pomplamoose half Jack Conte.

== Reception ==
How I Knew Her was met with "generally favorable reviews" from critics. At Metacritic, which assigns a weighted average rating out of 100 to reviews from mainstream publications, this release received an average score of 68, based on 12 reviews.

Professional ratings
Aggregate scores
Source	Rating
Metacritic	68/100
Review scores
Source	Rating
AllMusic	4/5 stars
BBC Music	8/10
Boston Globe	8/10
Consequence of Sound	C+
Drowned In Sound	710
The Independent	8/10
Mojo	4/5 stars
MusicOMH	3.5/5 stars
PopMatters	3/10
Q	3/5 stars
Spin	4/10
Uncut	7/10

== Track listing ==
No.	Title	Length
1.	"Araceli"	2:15
2.	"Leslie"	2:37
3.	"How I Knew Her"	4:40
4.	"Back to the Barracks"	2:30
5.	"Long Running Joke"	3:36
6.	"Counting Down"	4:13
7.	"Caroline"	2:52
8.	"Please Don't Scream"	3:35
9.	"Still a Believer"	2:50
10.	"Even Steven"	3:26
11.	"Why Did You Marry"	4:20
12.	"I Just Wanted You to Get Old"	2:25
Total length:		39:19
