= Julia Nunes =

American musician (born 1989)

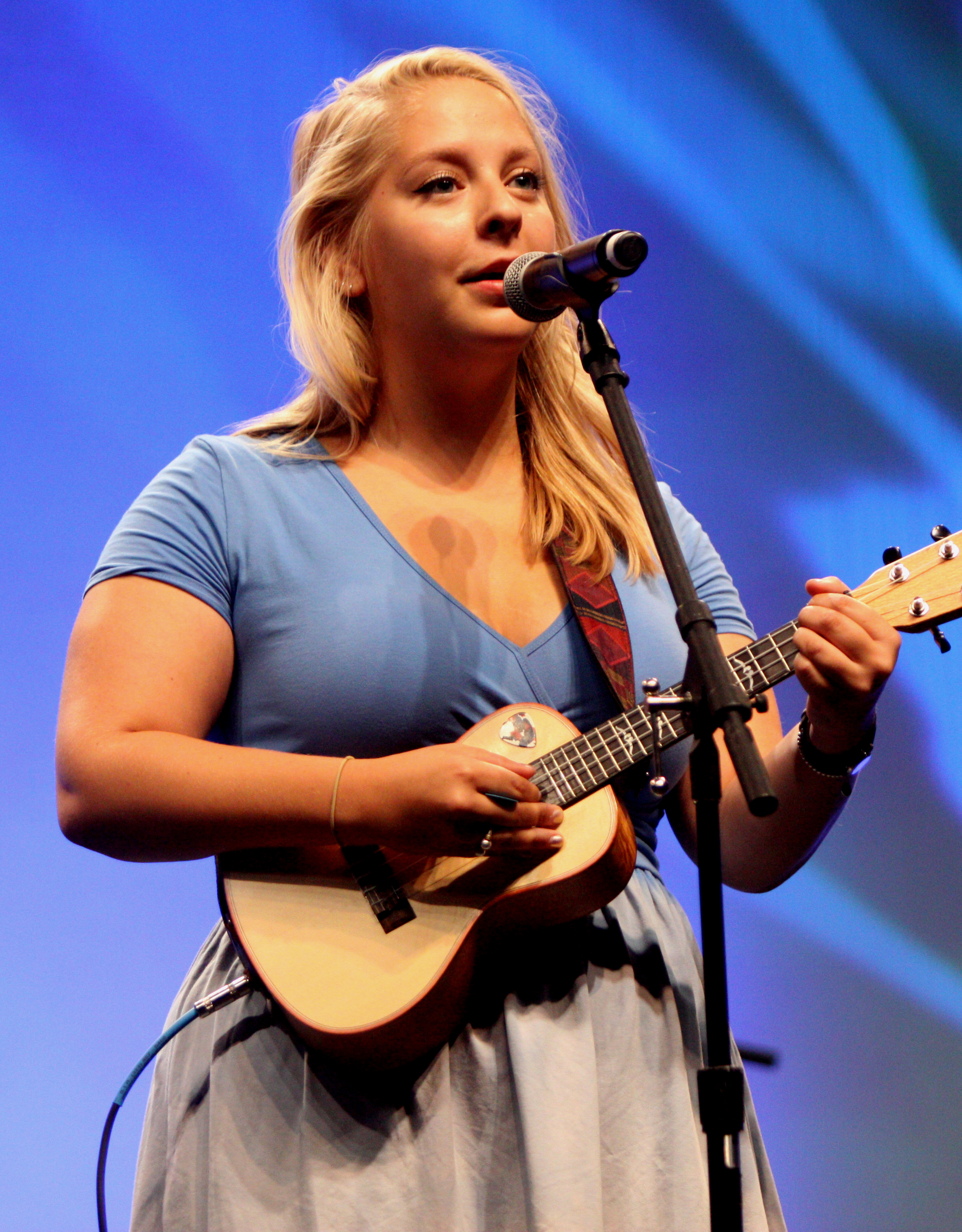
- Nunes in 2012

Background information
- Born: January 3, 1989 (age 37); New York, United States
- Origin: Fairport, New York, United States
- Genres: Acoustic pop, indie pop
- Occupation: Musician
- Instruments: Ukulele; guitar; melodica; piano; vocals
- Labels: Rude Butler, DFTBA

Julia Nunes (born January 3, 1989) is an American singer-songwriter from Fairport, New York. Her career has progressed online through her videos of pop songs on YouTube, in which she sings harmony with herself and plays acoustic instruments, primarily the ukulele, guitar, melodica, and piano.

== Biography and career ==
Nunes was born into a musical family in New York. Her father is a pianist and a composer of children's songs. One grandfather was a composer of Portuguese fado music and the other a jazz pianist. Nunes started piano lessons at age seven, before switching to the guitar in her teens. She began writing songs at age 14 and playing the ukulele in 2005. She attended Skidmore College in Saratoga Springs, New York. Nunes also plays guitar and melodica.

=== YouTube videos ===
Nunes produces videos on YouTube. Among them are original songs as well as covers of some of Nunes' favorite bands, such as Say Anything, the Beatles, the Beach Boys, and Destiny's Child. Her original songs have been featured on the main page of YouTube twice, under the username 'jaaaaaaa'.

On Good Morning America (June 30, 2008), Molly Ringwald stated that she took up the ukulele after seeing Julia Nunes on YouTube. "I've always wanted to play the ukulele, and she completely inspired me," she said.

Nunes is also featured in a YouTube cover video of "Some Nights" by fun., alongside members of the band Walk off the Earth.

Nunes covered the Bruno Mars song "That's What I Like" with the funk band Scary Pockets in 2017.

=== Recordings and performances ===
In May 2008, Nunes opened four times for one of her idols, Ben Folds, at the musician's request, and the same month she performed at the Bushman Ukulele Luau at The Knitting Factory in New York after having won the 2007 Bushman World Ukulele Video Contest. On October 25, 2008, she opened for the Bacon Brothers at The State University of New York at Geneseo. On November 22, 2008, Nunes performed her song "Maybe I Will" on YouTube Live '08 in San Francisco. She was joined onstage by The YouTube Ukulele Orchestra, which is composed of fellow YouTube ukulele players Wade Johnston, Dustin Domingo, Philip Fernandez, and Narciso Lobo. In January 2009, Nunes played four sold-out shows in London, England, and was interviewed and performed on BBC Radio 1. In June 2009, she played two shows and participated in the artist signing tent at Bonnaroo, the independent music festival held in Manchester, TN; she also completed a second tour of England. Nunes began recording her third album of original music in August 2009, working with Jack Conte and Nataly Dawn of Pomplamoose as producers.

Nunes has also appeared in several videos with Jake & Amir of CollegeHumor.

She played at Bonnaroo 2010, her second time there. Nunes started the event on the main stage at noon, June 11, 2010, and also played alongside Weezer on the second night. She opened for Ben Kweller at Indiana University's Buskirk-Chumley Theater on November 13, 2010, as part of Kweller's tour. On January 24, 2012, Nunes made her television debut, performing "Stay Awake" on Conan.

On January 3, 2017, Nunes began a Kickstarter campaign for her sixth album and achieved over twice its funding goal.

== Charity work ==
In December 2008, Nunes participated in the Green brothers' Project for Awesome. Rather than tell YouTubers to donate time or money to a charity, she offered one of her hand-knit hats on eBay, promising to donate the proceeds of the auction, and her own matching funds, to the Lupus Foundation of America. The hat sold for US$1,250.00, after which she asked her followers to help her make the donation, promising US$500.00 of her own money.

== Music ==
=== Left Right Wrong ===
Nunes' first album, Left Right Wrong, contained all original compositions and came out in the summer of 2007. It was released independently, published by JuNu Music (ASCAP), on Nunes' label Rude Butler Music. Following YouTube success, as of June 2008, Nunes arranged a distribution deal for Left Right Wrong with Burnside Distribution Corporation, and the album can now be purchased through some mainstream sources. The twelve tracks (ten studio, two live) were recorded with just guitar and voice, without the overdubs which feature in her YouTube videos.

=== I Wrote These ===
I Wrote These was released on October 15, 2008, containing original compositions by Nunes, except for Track 12, "Sugar Coats", which was co-written with her friend and fellow musician Kirk Stevens. Like her first album, I Wrote These was released on her Rude Butler Music label and copyrighted to JuNu Music. The album was tracked and mixed at Studio Arts Entertainment and Hilltop Recording in Greenwich, NY, by Peter Kobor and Chris Roberson. The record features mostly acoustic tracks, although Nunes is joined on a few songs by a full band (including Todd Haviland on bass and Dave Harris on drums). Guest vocalists include Dan Gocek, Kirk Stevens, and Andy Martin. Other musical accompaniment includes whistling, finger snapping, and beatboxing. I Wrote These was mastered by Steve Forney at the studios at Linden Oaks, in Rochester, New York.

=== I Think You Know ===
Nunes began recording her third album of original music in August 2009, and worked with Jack Conte and Nataly Dawn as producers. The album was released on iTunes on February 2, 2010, through her own record label, Rude Butler Records.

=== YouTube Covers ===
Nunes' first album of covers is titled YouTube Covers. It was released on November 3, 2010. It features eleven covers from such artists as the Beatles, Queen, the Beach Boys, Paramore, and many others. It was released through her own record label, Rude Butler Records.

=== Settle Down ===
On June 11, 2011, Nunes launched a Kickstarter campaign for her fourth album. Her goal was $15,000, but in less than 24 hours, she had already received over $19,000 in donations. By the conclusion of the campaign, the project had $77,888 in donations, making it the third most-funded music project in Kickstarter's history (behind Nataly Dawn's solo album and a collaboration between Amanda Palmer and Neil Gaiman). On December 6, 2011, she posted the album art, revealing the title to be Settle Down, and announced the album's release date as February 28, 2012.

"He is Mad", "Pizza", and "I Wasn't Worried" are mini-songs roughly a minute in length, all of which Nunes recorded videos for and posted to YouTube. Other songs, like "Odd", "Balloons", "First Impressions", "Comatose", and "Into the Sunshine" appeared on previous albums, but were re-recorded for Settle Down. Nunes also updated the Kickstarter project page with a video of her performing "Stay Awake" in the Kickstarter offices (thanks to the overwhelming success of her campaign). On January 24, 2012, she performed "Stay Awake" on Conan to promote the album.

=== Some Feelings ===
Julia Nunes' fifth album, titled Some Feelings, was released on September 25, 2015. Another Kickstarter project, the album raised $134,403 from 3,258 backers. The video for her single "Make Out" features extended takes of couples kissing, including band members as well as Nunes and her former girlfriend Dannielle Owens-Reid.

=== UGHWOW ===
Julia Nunes' sixth album, titled UGHWOW, was released on June 21, 2019. Again funded through Kickstarter, it raised $71,025 from 2,409 funders.

== Discography ==
Julia Nunes discography
- Studio albums: 6
- Extended plays: 1
- Singles: 11
- Music videos: 6

=== Studio albums ===
Title	Album details
Left Right Wrong	Released: 2007; Label: Rude Butler; Formats: CD, digital download
I Wrote These	Released: October 15, 2008; Label: Rude Butler; Formats: CD, digital download
I Think You Know	Released: February 2, 2010; Label: Rude Butler; Formats: CD, Digital download
YouTube Covers	Released: November 3, 2010; Label: Rude Butler; Formats: Digital download
Settle Down	Released: February 28, 2012; Label: Mordomo; Formats: CD, digital download
Some Feelings	Released: September 25, 2015; Label: Rude Butler; Formats: CD, digital download, streaming

=== EPs ===
Title	Album details
UGHWOW	Released: June 21, 2019; Label: Rude Butler; Formats: CD, digital download, streaming

=== Singles ===
Title	Year	Album
"No Sudden Moves"	2019	UGHWOW
"Dear Ben"	2020	Non-album singles
"We're Not in Love"	2020	Non-album singles
"I Really Do"	2020	Non-album singles
"Can I Be Done"	2020	Non-album singles
"It's Easy"	2020	Non-album singles
"Has to Be"	2020	Non-album singles
August 2020"	2020	Non-album singles
"Promise"	2020	Non-album singles
"Magic"	2021	Non-album singles
"Make Believe"	2021	Non-album singles
"Life Is Long"	2022	Non-album singles
"Late Night, Austin"	2024	Non-album singles

=== Music videos ===
Year	Title	Album
2012	"Stay Awake"	Settle Down
2016	"Make Out"	Some Feelings
2016	"I Don't Want To"	Some Feelings
2019	"No Sudden Moves	UGHWOW
2019	"Used to Want"	UGHWOW
2021	"Make Believe"	—N/a
