= Pomplamoose discography =

- Studio albums: 7
- EPs: 3
- Soundtrack albums: 1
- Live albums: 1
- Compilation albums: 8
- Singles: 224
- Music videos: 29

The discography of American musical duo Pomplamoose consists of seven studio albums, eight compilation albums, one soundtrack, one live album, three extended plays, 29 music videos, and over 220 singles.

== Albums ==
=== Studio albums ===
Title	Details
Pomplamoose (VideoSongs)	Released: March 11, 2009; Label: ShadowTree; Formats: Digital download
Tribute to Famous People	Released: March 15, 2010; Label: ShadowTree; Formats: Digital download, streaming
Hey It's Pomplamoose	Released: May 21, 2012; Label: Self-released; Formats: Digital download, streaming
Winter Wishes	Released: November 27, 2018; Label: Self-released; Formats: CD, digital download, streaming
Invisible People	Released: December 3, 2020; Label: Self-released; Formats: LP, CD, digital download, streaming
Impossible à Prononcer	Released: August 12, 2021; Label: Self-released; Formats: LP, digital download, streaming
Photogénique	Released: July 16, 2025; Label: Self-released; Formats: LP, CD, digital download, streaming

=== Compilation albums ===
Title	Details
the album you bought at our show (thanks for that)	Released: 2011; Label: Self-released; Formats: CD
Pomplamoose: Season 2	Released: July 29, 2014; Label: Self-released; Formats: CD, digital download, streaming
Besides	Released: June 23, 2015; Label: Self-released; Formats: Digital download, streaming
Best of 2018	Released: December 4, 2018; Label: Self-released; Formats: CD, digital download, streaming
Best of 2019	Released: May 5, 2020; Label: Self-released; Formats: CD, digital download, streaming
Worst of 2020	Released: February 23, 2021; Label: Self-released; Formats: CD, digital download, streaming
Best of 2021	Released: July 8, 2022; Label: Self-released; Formats: Digital download, streaming
Daft Pomp	Released: November 10, 2022; Label: Self-released; Format: Vinyl, digital download, streaming

=== Live albums ===
Title	Details
Pomplamoose Live	Released: December 1, 2016; Label: Self-released; Formats: Digital download, streaming

=== Soundtrack albums ===
Title	Details
Lucid Dreaming Soundtrack	Released: August 5, 2020; Label: Self-released; Formats: Digital download, streaming

== Extended plays ==
Title	Details
3 New Songs Woot!	Released: January 19, 2010; Label: ShadowTree; Formats: Digital download
Christmas in Space	Released: November 28, 2010; Label: Self-released; Formats: Digital download
En Français (with John Schroeder)	Released: April 17, 2020; Label: Self-released; Formats: LP, CD, digital download

== Singles ==
=== 2000s ===
Title	Year	Album
"Le Commun des Mortels"	2009	Non-album single

=== 2010s ===
Title	Year	Album
"Another Day"	2010	the album you bought at our show (thanks for that) and 3 New Songs Woot!
"It Goes On" (with Louis Cole & Genevieve Artadi)	2011	Non-album single
"Pharrell Mashup"	2014	Season 2
"Lorde 2Pac Beck Mashup"	2014	Season 2 and Live
"Gotye Call Me Maybe Mashup"	2014	Non-album single
"Like a Million"	2014	Besides
"I Feel Good"	2014	Besides
"Wake Me Up Before You Go-Go"	2014	Season 2
"Don't Stop Lovin' Me"	2014	Non-album single
"Somewhere Over the Rainbow"	2014	Besides
"Come Together"	2014	Besides
"All About That Super Bass"	2014	Besides
"Stevie Wonder Herbie Hancock Mashup"	2015	Besides
"Uptown Funk"	2015	Besides
"Like a Prayer"	2015	Besides
"I'm the Shit"	2015	Besides
"Jingle Bells"	2016	Christmas in Space
"Lovefool"	2018	Best of 2018
"You Make My Dreams"	2018	Non-album single
"Saturday"	2018	Non-album single
"Time After Time"	2018	Non-album single
"Tainted Love"	2018	Non-album single
"Silly Boy"	2018	Best of 2018
"Killing Me Softly"	2018	Non-album singles
"Seven"	2018	Non-album singles
"A Bad Mashup: Bad Romance / Bad Blood"	2018	Best of 2018
"Grunt Work"	2018	Non-album single
"Pumped Up Kid a Mashup: Pumped Up Kicks / Everything In Its Right Place"	2018	Best of 2018
"Right at the Same Time"	2018	Non-album single
"Bulletproof"	2018	Best of 2018
"Sorry Not Sorry"	2018	Non-album single
"Wrap It Up"	2018	Non-album single
"Jamirobeegees Mashup: Stayin' Alive / Virtual Insanity"	2018	Best of 2018
"Slow Dance"	2018	Non-album singles
"The Power of Love"	2018	Non-album singles
"Living in a Bubble"	2018	Non-album singles
"Maneater"	2018	Best of 2018
"All American Blues"	2018	Non-album singles
"Rich Girl"	2018	Non-album singles
"Talkin' About My Baby"	2018	Non-album singles
"Good Morning Insomnia"	2018	Non-album singles
"Eleanor Rigby"	2018	Non-album singles
"Go Easy"	2018	Non-album singles
"Crush + Someone Like You Mashup" (featuring Tessa Violet)	2018	Non-album singles
"D.N.A. Moves Like Jagger Mashup" (featuring David Choi)	2018	Non-album singles
"Ain't No Mountain My Girl Mashup"	2018	Best of 2018
"Welcome to My Planet"	2018	Best of 2018
"I'm a Believer"	2018	Worst of 2020
"Feel It Still"	2018	Best of 2018
"Be Better At Listening"	2018	Best of 2018
"Is Everything Perfect"	2018	Non-album singles
"Make Me Feel"	2018	Non-album singles
"Can't Stop Feeling Billie Jean's Face"	2018	Best of 2018
"White Flag"	2018	Non-album singles
"Monster Mashup" (featuring Tessa Violet)	2018	Non-album singles
"We Still Got Us" (featuring David Choi)	2018	Non-album singles
"The Way I Am"	2018	Non-album singles
"Another One Bites the Dust"	2018	Non-album singles
"50 Ways to Leave Your Lover" (featuring Imaginary Future)	2019	Non-album singles
"Dancing On My Own" (featuring Kina Grannis)	2019	Non-album singles
"Cecilia" (featuring Imaginary Future)	2019	Non-album singles
"Breakup Mashup" (featuring Dodie)	2019	Best of 2019
"I'd Rather Dance with You"	2019	Non-album singles
"I Kissed a Girl y Me Gusta" (featuring Jon Cozart)	2019	Non-album singles
"Shotgun" (featuring Dodie)	2019	Non-album singles
"Who Cares"	2019	Non-album singles
"Shallow"	2019	Non-album singles
"You Don't Know Me" (featuring Jon Cozart)	2019	Non-album singles
"Bury a Friend"	2019	Non-album singles
"A Vizsla in a Tesla in Ibiza"	2019	Non-album singles
"Lisztomania"	2019	Best of 2019
"Breathe Your Name"	2019	Non-album singles
"In the Waiting Line"	2019	Non-album singles
"It's Like You're Always On My Mind"	2019	Best of 2019
"Sucker" (featuring Meghan Tonjes)	2019	Non-album singles
"Le Coquelicot"	2019	Non-album singles
"Dancing's Not a Crime"	2019	Non-album singles
"Shoopty-Doowop"	2019	Non-album singles
"Je Me Suis Fait Tous Petit" (featuring John Schroeder)	2019	En Français
"Outta My Head" (featuring Inara George)	2019	Non-album singles
"Old Town Road Pony Mashup"	2019	Best of 2019
"You've Got a Friend in Me" (featuring Taylor Davis)	2019	Non-album singles
"Loving Is Easy"	2019	Non-album singles
"Red Hot Chili Smashup"	2019	Best of 2019
"I'm Still Standing"	2019	Best of 2019
"Something About Us" (Note: This was also released as part of Daft Pomp (2022))	2019	Best of 2019
"Walk Me Home"	2019	Non-album singles
"Beautiful People" (featuring Ali Spagnola, Malinda, and Jon Cozart)	2019	Non-album singles
"Here It Goes Again"	2019	Non-album singles
"Unwritten" (featuring Malinda)	2019	Non-album singles
"Love You Madly"	2019	Non-album singles
"Sympathique" (featuring John Schroeder)	2019	Non-album singles
"Sweet Dreams Seven Nation Army Mashup" (featuring Sarah Dugas)	2019	Best of 2019
"The Way You Look Tonight"	2019	Non-album singles
"Digital Love"	2019	Non-album singles
"Everybody Wants to Rule the World"	2019	Non-album singles
"Harder, Better, Faster, Stronger"	2019	Best of 2019
"Mr. Blue Sky"	2019	Best of 2019
"Rainbow Connection"	2019	Non-album singles
"Hooked on a Feeling"	2019	Non-album singles
"Les Yeux Noirs" (featuring The Vignes Rooftop Revival)	2019	En Français
"Bad Day" (featuring Jonah Baker)	2019	Non-album singles
"Nobody" (featuring Brian Green)	2019	Non-album singles
"Here We Come a Caroling"	2019	Non-album singles
"Sous le Ciel de Paris" (featuring Ross Garren)	2019	En Français
"I Will Survive + This Love Mashup" (featuring Andie Case)	2019	Best of 2019
"How It Ends"	2019	Non-album single

=== 2020s ===
Title	Year	Album
"Les Champs-Élysées" (featuring John Schroeder)	2020	En Français and Worst of 2020
"Don't Start Now"	2020	Non-album single
"Yeah OK Alright It's Your Birthday"	2020	Non-album single
"Foux Du Fafa" (featuring John Schroeder)	2020	En Français
"Nuages" (featuring John Schroeder)	2020	En Français
"Someone You Loved"	2020	Non-album singles
"Something (Beatles song)"	2020	Non-album singles
"Everything I Wanted"	2020	Non-album singles
"Monster" (featuring Dodie)	2020	Non-album singles
"Hot Girl Bummer"	2020	Non-album singles
"Lovely Day / Good as Hell Mashup"	2020	Worst of 2020
"Get Me Out"	2020	Non-album singles
"Everybody's Got to Learn Sometime"	2020	Non-album singles
"Still the One / Shout"	2020	Non-album singles
"Just the Two of Us"	2020	Worst of 2020
"Case of the Monday's"	2020	Non-album singles
"Latch"	2020	Non-album singles
"Happy Together"	2020	Non-album singles
"Let Loose"	2020	Non-album singles
"Blinding Lights"	2020	Non-album singles
"Si Veo / Girl from Ipanema Mashup" (featuring Ledes Diaz)	2020	Non-album singles
"Oh, Pretty Woman"	2020	Non-album singles
"Always Something There to Remind Me"	2020	Non-album singles
"It's the End of the World as We Know It" (featuring Maddie Poppe)	2020	Worst of 2020
"If I Ever Lose My Faith in You"	2020	Non-album singles
"Stupid Love"	2020	Non-album singles
"Comment Te Dire Adieu"	2020	Non-album singles
"Le Copains D'abord" (featuring Ross Garren)	2020	Non-album singles
"Soak Up the Summer Mashup"	2020	Non-album singles
"Instant Crush"	2020	Worst of 2020 / Daft Pomp
"The Logical Song"	2020	Worst of 2020
"All The Way"	2020	Invisible People
"Kiss Me"	2020	Worst of 2020
"Stress Me Out"	2020	Invisible People and Worst of 2020
"One Way or Another"	2020	Worst of 2020
"Be Better at Listening	2020	Invisible People
"The Middle"	2020	Non-album singles
"Blue + Around the World Mashup"	2020	Non-album singles
"North American Scum"	2020	Non-album singles
"Invisible People"	2020	Invisible People
"Sleeping Without You"	2020	Invisible People
"Lonely People"	2020	Non-album single
"Hot Tub"	2020	Invisible People
"I Still Haven't Found What I'm Looking For" (with KT Tunstall)	2020	Worst of 2020
"I Always Love You"	2020	Invisible People
"Sad on Instagram"	2020	Invisible People
"Prioritise-moi"	2020	Invisible People
"Charlie Brown Christmas Mashup"	2020	Non-album single
"Douce France" (featuring John Tegmeyer)	2020	Impossible à Prononcer
"Dreams" (with Sam Wilkes)	2020	Worst of 2020
"Lady Lana Mashup"	2021	Non-album singles
"Laisse béton" (featuring Erik Morin)	2021	Non-album singles
"99 Red Balloons + Take On Me Mashup"	2021	Non-album singles
"Say So"	2021	Non-album singles
"What I Like About You"	2021	Non-album singles
"Faut Oblier" (featuring Cyrille Aimée)	2021	Non-album singles
"Dream"	2021	Non-album singles
"Sunday Best"	2021	Non-album singles
"Assedic"	2021	Non-album singles
"You Get What You Give"	2021	Non-album singles
"Drivers License"	2021	Non-album singles
"Britney Mashup: Toxic + ...Baby One More Time"	2021	Non-album singles
"Baby Shark"	2021	Non-album singles
"Sam's Idea"	2021	Invisible People
"Girls Just Wanna Dance with Somebody Mashup"	2021	Non-album singles
"All the Things She Said"	2021	Non-album singles
"Read Me"	2021	Non-album singles
Doin' It Right	2021	
"Every Breath You Take + 500 Miles Mashup"	2021	Non-album singles
"Thank You"	2021	Non-album singles
"La chanson de Maxence"	2021	Impossible à Prononcer
"Once in a Lifetime	2021	Non-album singles
"Time of the Season"	2021	Non-album singles
"Big Yellow Taxi"	2021	Non-album singles
"Que reste-t-il de nos amours"	2021	Impossible à Prononcer
"Jean-Marie"	2021	Non-album single
"Chanson sur ma drôle de vie"	2021	Impossible à Prononcer
"All Eyes on Me" (with Nick Campbell Destroys and Swatkins)	2021	Non-album singles
"Blank Space"	2021	Non-album singles
"I Try"	2021	Non-album singles
"Stuck in the Middle with You"	2021	Non-album singles
"Extreme Ways" (featuring Moby)	2021	Non-album singles
"If You Go To Mars"	2021	Non-album singles
"Dancing in the Moonlight"	2021	Non-album singles
"Transparent Soul" (featuring Loren Battley)	2021	Non-album singles
"Grace Kelly" (featuring Grace Kelly)	2021	Non-album singles
"Life Goes On"	2021	Non-album singles
"Soul Love" (featuring Jacaranda)	2021	Non-album singles
"Every Little Thing She Does Is Magic"	2021	Non-album singles
"Me and Julio Down by the Schoolyard" (featuring Lawrence)	2021	Non-album singles
"The Prime Time of Your Life"	2022	Non-album singles
"Jump (For My Love)"	2022	Non-album singles
"Kids"	2022	Non-album singles
"Dancing in the Dark"	2022	Non-album singles
"High and Dry"	2022	Non-album singles
"Maniac"	2022	Non-album singles
"I Want You to Want Me"	2022	Non-album singles
"It Will Come in Time"	2022	Non-album singles
"Thinkin Bout You"	2022	Non-album singles
"Santa Barbara"	2022	Non-album singles
"Big Brown Eyes" (with Benny Sings)	2022	Non-album singles
"As It Was" (featuring Sarah Dugas)	2022	Non-album singles
"Call Me"	2022	Non-album singles
"Expiration Date" (Note: "Expiration Date" originally appeared on Pomplamoose's album Pomplamoose (VideoSongs).) (featuring Naheen Khula)	2022	Non-album singles
"À Los Angeles"	2022	Non-album singles
"Don't Dream It's Over" (featuring Sara Niemietz)	2022	Non-album singles
"Blue Light" (with JE Sunde)	2022	Non-album singles
"Inside and Out" (featuring Sarah Dugas)	2022	Non-album singles
"Next Life" (featuring J.E. Sunde)	2022	Non-album singles
"Hide and Seek" (featuring Bella Porter)	2022	Non-album singles
"Why Would You Do That" (featuring J.E. Sunde)	2022	Non-album singles
"Make Love"	2022	Daft Pomp
Technologic	2022	Daft Pomp
"Daft PTX Mashup"	2022	Daft Pomp
"À Cabo" (featuring Larry Goldings)	2023	Photogénique
"Tu peux pas savoir" (with Larry Goldings)	2023	Photogénique
"Julie"	2023	Photogénique
"Félicitations!"	2023	Photogénique
"Nuclear Kittens (ça devient chaud)"	2024	Photogénique
"Angélique"	2024	Photogénique
"C'est Simple"	2024	Photogénique
"Angélique" (nouvelle version)	2025	Non-album singles
"Julie" (nouvelle version)	2025	Non-album singles
"Nuclear Kittens" (nouvelle version)	2025	Non-album singles

== Music videos ==
Year	Title	Album
2012	"Don't Stop Lovin' Me"	—
2012	"Do Not Push – A Gotye Call Me Maybe Mashup"	—
2012	"Batman Theme ("Do Not Push" Sequel)"	—
2012	"I'll Be There in a Minute"	—
2012	"Hey It's Pomplamoose"	Hey It's Pomplamoose
2013	"Lorde 2Pac Beck Mashup"	Season 2
2014	"Pharrell Mashup (Happy Get Lucky)"	Season 2
2014	"Like a Million"	Besides
2014	Puttin' On the Ritz"	Season 2
2014	"30 Rock"	Besides
2014	"Come Together"	Besides
2014	"Believe"	Season 2
2014	"Video Killed the Radio Star"	Season 2
2014	"All About That Super Bass"	Besides
2014	"Get That Body Back"	Season 2
2014	"Fight Back	Season 2
2015	"Uptown Funk"	Besides
2015	"I'm the Shit"	Besides
2015	"Come Out to Play"	Season 2
2015	"Walking on Sunshine"	Besides
2015	"Pay Attention"	Besides
2020	"All the Way"	Invisible People
2020	"Stress Me Out"	Invisible People
2020	"Better at Listening"	Invisible People
2020	"Sleeping Without You"	Invisible People
2020	"Hot Tub"	Invisible People
2020	"Invisible People"	Invisible People
2020	"Prioritise-moi"	Invisible People
2020	"Sad on Instagram"	Invisible People
2021	"Sam's Idea"	Invisible People
2022	"Technologic"	Daft Pomp
