= Settle Down =

Settle Down may refer to:

- "Settle Down" (Kimbra song)
- "Settle Down" (No Doubt song)
- "Settle Down" (The 1975 song)
- "Settle Down", by Breaks Co-Op, from the album The Sound Inside (2005)
- "Settle Down (Goin' Down That Highway)", a song written by Mike Settle
- Settle Down (album), an album by Julia Nunes
