= Latinidad =

Shared attributes of Latin American people

Latinidad is a Spanish-language term that refers to the various attributes shared by Latin American people and their descendants without reducing those similarities to any single essential trait. It was first adopted within US Latino studies by the sociologist Felix Padilla in his 1985 study of Mexicans and Puerto Ricans in Chicago, and has since been used by a wide range of scholars as a way to speak of Latino communities and cultural practices outside a strictly Latin American context. As a social construct, latinidad references "a particular geopolitical experience but it also contains within it the complexities and contradictions of immigration, (post)(neo)colonialism, race, color, legal status, class, nation, language and the politics of location." As a theoretical concept, latinidad is a useful way to discuss amalgamations of Latin American cultures and communities outside of any singular national frame. Latinidad also names the result of forging a shared cultural identity out of disparate elements in order to wield political and social power through pan-Latino solidarity. Rather than be defined as any singular phenomenon, understandings of Latinidad are contingent on place-specific social relations.

== Latinidad and culture ==
Latinidad invokes pan-Latino solidarity among Latinos in ways that illuminate an understanding of identity, place, and belonging. 'We're all one heart here. There are no distinctions of race, of country, or culture'. This so-called Latinization of the U.S. has the potential to profoundly reshape the parameters of democracy, citizenship, and national identity. Culture involves a dynamic interplay between flow and pause. In this sense, flows and pauses, and the dynamic tension between these two polarities, can be seen to be at the heart of latinidad as a form of cultural coherence. Manifestations of latinidad are evidenced at numerous scales, from the very local scale of the individual and his or her immediate zone of inhabitance—a block, a neighborhood, a street—to nations and world regions that are hemispheric in scale. It is place-specific: both shaped, and is shaped by, the context in which it emerges. Latinidad has important ramifications for national, transnational, hemispheric, and even global, modalities of belonging. According to Price (2007) this flexible coalescence of identity around a variously imagined Latinidad provides fertile conceptual and empirical terrain for understanding how culture coalesces at the scale of quotidian human encounters.

== Latinidad and Latino Studies ==
Numerous scholars have taken up the term latinidad as a way to address the cultural practices of pan-Latino communities. It has been particularly central to discussions of popular culture, media, the arts and activism. Arlene Dávila suggests that the aggregation of Latino populations that latinidad names functions to serve the economic needs of transnational markets, stressing the ways that Latino communities are whitened in the process. David Román and Alberto Sandoval use the term to examine and critique the "organic understanding and appreciation of all things Latino". In the book, Queer Latinidad: Identity Practices, Discursive Spaces, Juana María Rodríguez uses the term to explore how diverse LGBT Latino identities are imagined, performed, or practiced within different venues including community activism, law, and digital cultures. Latino studies scholar, Deborah Paredez, combines the term latinidad with the subject of her book on tejana singer songwriter Selena, in her book Selenidad: Selena, Latinos, and the Performance of Memory. And in Performing Queer Latinidad: Dance, Sexuality, Politics, Ramon H. Rivera-Servera deploys the term to speak about the communities engendered through dance and other forms of cultural performance Rutgers University Press has a book series entitled: Latinidad: Transnational Cultures in the United States. A study by María Elena Cepeda finds Shakira as the "Idealized Transnational Citizen" and describes her as a symbol of "Colombianidad" and Latinidad.

== Latinidad critiques ==
In 2003 Alisa Valdes-Rodriguez published her first novel, The Dirty Girls Social Club, where she explores the underlying tensions, conflicts, and contradictions inherent in the social construction of latinidad. In both of her novels, The Dirty Girls Social Club (2003) and Playing with Boys, Valdes-Rodriguez keys in on both race and social class and the ways in which the two are inextricably linked. In 2019, Urayoán Noel published an article that analyzed contemporary Undocu queer poet, Alan Pelaez Lopez’s social media posts regarding Latinidad’s complexity and inherent harm on Black, Queer, and Indigenous communities.

== See also ==
- AfroLatinidad
- La Raza
