= Arlene Dávila =

Puerto Rican professor of Latino/a Studies

- Born: Vega Baja, Puerto Rico
- Occupations: Professor of Anthropology and American Studies, New York University
- Known for: Latino studies

Arlene Dávila (born in Vega Baja, Puerto Rico) is a Puerto Rican professor of Latino/a Studies. She has contributed to the field of Latino/a Studies as both an author and professor. She is the founding director of The Latinx Project, and has written eight books and many articles on issues ranging from depictions of public images of Latinos, marketing to Latinos, cultural politics in Puerto Rico, and Latinization of the United States. Her research focuses on race and ethnicity, media studies, and Puerto Rican national identities. She is a professor at New York University.

== Education and academic career ==
In 1987, Dávila received her Bachelor of Arts in anthropology from Tufts University. In 1990, she received a master's degree in Anthropology and Museum Studies from New York University. She received her Ph.D. in Cultural Anthropology from the City University of New York in 1996. She is affiliated with the American Anthropological Association, the Puerto Rican Studies Association, the American Studies Association and the Latin American Studies Association. Davila holds the title of Professor of Anthropology, American Studies and Social and Cultural Analysis at New York University. Her primary focus and research has been on Latino experiences in the United States and their representation in the media.

== Research interests ==
- Race and ethnicity: Dávila highlights the cultural clashes that occur between Latinos in her book Barrio Dreams as well as in her other texts. By addressing the issues of race and ethnicity that arise not only with the United States but also the racial divides that occur between Latinos, Davila brings to light how race and ethnicity dominate not only in other cultural areas but also within the Latino community.
- Nationalism: Dávila focuses on this subject in Sponsored Identities: Cultural Politics in Puerto Rico. She highlights the importance of understanding the sense of cultural nationalism that exists between Puerto Ricans and the United States. The subject of how nationalism has become a political construct is analyzed in various different forms.
- Media studies: Dávila devotes her attention to the marginalization of Latinos in the media and their general stereotypical representation that can be seen in various different media outlets.
- Political economy and globalization: The politics of museum and visual representation
- Urban studies: Dávila focus her attention on Latinos in urban areas, primarily Puerto Ricans in New York.
- Creative Economies and Consumption: Dávila delves into the issues surrounding the Latino market and how Latino consumption can be analyzed by contemporary Latino politics.
- Latinos in the US: This is Dávila's main focus of her written work, analyzing how Latinos are viewed and the dynamics that arise from the Latino culture in the United States.

== Book descriptions ==
- Barrio Dreams: Dávila writes about the Latino and specifically Puerto Rican experience in New York with a focus on social and racial classes. The University of California Press said “Barrio Dreams makes a compelling case that—despite neoliberalism's race-and ethnicity-free tenets—dreams of economic empowerment are never devoid of distinct racial and ethnic considerations.”
- Latinos, Inc: Dávila explores the increasing marketing to and of Latinos as their population increases in the US. Dávila concludes that Latinos are increasingly exoticized and invisible in the marketplace despite their presence and increase in population. The University of California press describes the book: “In a fascinating discussion of how populations have become reconfigured as market segments, she [Dávila] shows that the market and marketing discourse become important terrains where Latinos debate their social identities and public standing.”
- Latino Spin: Dávila argues that Latinos do contribute to US society and are more American than Americans. She contrasts her argument with the increasingly common US attitude that Latinos are negatively impacting US national identity.
- Latinx Art: Dávila draws on numerous interviews with artists, dealers, and curators to explore the problem of visualizing Latinx art and artists. Providing an inside and critical look of the global contemporary art market, Dávila's book is at once an introduction to contemporary Latinx art and a call to decolonize the art world and practices that erase and whitewash Latinx artists.
- Mambo Montage: Dávila looks at Mambo (a Cuban dance) and the latinization of New York City.
- Sponsored Identities: Dávila examines the Institute for Puerto Rican Culture, the Puerto Rican national identity, and authenticity in Puerto Rican culture. She also describes commercialization increasingly as culture in Puerto Rico.
- Culture Works: Dávila shows that the cultural economy, while appearing to be accessible to all, is not. Neoliberal policies and racial and social divides keep the cultural economy specific to certain races and classes. Dávila uses Puerto Rico, New York City, and Buenos Aires as examples as how similar processes of unequal cultural production and distribution of its benefits transcend locales.
- El Mall: Dávila looks at hopping mall culture that exists in Latin America. Her research takes into account the spatial and class politics of Latin American shopping malls. She argues that shopping malls anchor significant debates on the future of Latin American societies and influence modernity and democracy.

== Published works ==
=== Books ===
- El Mall: The Spatial and Class Politics of Shopping Malls in Latin America. University of California Press, 2016.
- Culture Works: Space, Value and Mobility Across the Neoliberal Americas NYU Press, 2012.
- Latino Spin: Public Image and the Whitewashing of Race. NYU Press, 2008
- Barrio Dreams: Puerto Ricans, Latinos and the Neoliberal City. University of California Press, 2004
- Latinos Inc.: Marketing and the Making of a People. University of California Press, 2001.
- Mambo Montage: The Latinization of New York, co-edited with Agustin Lao. Columbia University Press, 2001
- Sponsored Identities: Cultural Politics in Puerto Rico. Temple University Press, 1997
- Latinx Art: Artists, Markets, Politics

=== Selected articles ===
- (2005) El Barrio's ‘We Are Watching You Campaign’: On the Politics of Inclusion in a Latinized Museum. AZTLAN: A Journal of Chicano Studies. 30 (1): 153–178
- (2004) El Barrio's 'We Are Watching You Campaign:' On the Politics of Inclusion in a Latinized Museum. AZTLAN: A Journal of Chicano Studies. 30 (1): 153–178
- (2004) Empowered Culture? New York City's empowerment Zone and the Selling of El Barrio. Annals of the American Academy of Political and Social Science. 594: 49–64
- (2002) Culture in the Adworld: Producing the Latin Look. In The Social Practice of Media: Anthropological Interventions in the Age of Electronic Reproduction. Lila Abu-Lughod, Faye Ginsburg and Brian Larkin, eds. Berkeley, CA: University of California Press. Berkeley: University of California Press. pp. 264–281
- (2000) Mapping Latinidad: Spanish, English and “Spanglish” in the Hispanic TV Landscape. Television and New Media. Vol. 1(1):73-92. Reprinted in Globalization on the Line: Culture, Citizenship and Capital at U.S. Borders. Claudia Sadowski-Smith, editor. St. Martin Press
- (2000) Talking Back: Hispanic Media and U.S. Latinidad. Centro: Journal of the Center for Puerto Rican Studies. Vol. 12(1): 37–48. Mary Romero, Jaime Cardenas and Michalle Habell-Pallan, Eds. New York, NY: New York University Press
- (1998) Local and Diasporic Tainos: Rethinking Taino Reality and Imagery. Latino Review of Books. 3(3): 2–10. Reprinted in Taino Revival: Critical Perspectives on Puerto Rican Identity and Cultural Politics. New York: Center for Puerto Rican Studies. Edited by Gabriel Haslip-Viera. pp. 11–30
- New York Times Article: “A Fix for Ignorance and Exclusion” Davila wrote this article in April 2011 concerning a possible National Museum of the American Latino. She states that she supports the project because it would highlight Latino-specific history in American history which is lacking.

== Awards ==
Arlene Dávila's book Latino Spin: Public Image and the Whitewashing of Race was selected as the 2010 best book in Latino Studies by the Latin American Studies Association.

== See also ==
- New York University
- Anthropology
- American Studies
- Latinidad
- Latino Studies
