= Marcelo Hernandez Castillo =

American poet

- Born: Zacatecas, Mexico
- Education: Sacramento State University, University of Michigan
- Writing career
- Genre: Poetry

Marcelo Hernandez Castillo, born 1988, is a poet and activist. He lives in Marysville, California, with his wife and son.

== Early life ==
Marcelo Hernandez Castillo was born in Zacatecas, Mexico. He moved to the United States at five years of age. His family settled in Yuba City, California, where his mother worked at a prune factory off Highway 113. In 2003, Castillo's father was deported. In 2017, the U.S. government allowed his parents to move back to Yuba City and apply for asylum.

== Career ==
He received a BA from Sacramento State University and was the first undocumented student to earn an MFA from the University of Michigan. He teaches at the low-residency MFA program in Ashland University, as well as to incarcerated youth in northern California. He has taught as a resident artist at the Atlantic Center for the Arts in Florida, and for low-income high school students in the Upward Bound program at UC Davis. He works within the Yuba-Sutter area as a substitute teacher.

Castillo's poems and essays can be found in BuzzFeed, Drunken Boat, Gulf Coast, Indiana Review, Jubilat, Muzzle Mag, New England Review, The Paris American, and Southern Humanities Review among others.

Along with C.D. Wright, Castillo has translated the poems of Mexican poet Marcelo Uribe.

== Honors ==
Castillo's manuscript, Cenzóntle, was selected by Brenda Shaughnessy as the 2017 winner of the A. Poulin Jr. Poetry Prize, from BOA Editions. It won the 2019 Great Lakes Colleges Association New Writers Award. His chapbook, Dulce, was selected by Chris Abani, Ed Roberson, and Matthew Shenoda for the Drinking Gourd Chapbook Poetry Prize.

A Pushcart nominee, Castillo has received fellowships from CantoMundo, the Squaw Valley Writer's Workshop, and the Vermont Studio Center.

== Books ==
- Cenzóntle, (2018) BOA Editions ISBN 9781942683537
- Dulce (2018), Northwestern University Press ISBN 9780810136960
- Children of the Land, memoir, (2020), Harper ISBN 9780062825599

== Activism ==
Castillo was a founder, with poets Javier Zamora and Christopher Soto (AKA Loma), of the Undocupoets campaign which eliminated citizenship requirements from major first poetry book prizes in the United States. With the Sibling Rivalry Press Foundation and Amazon Literary Partnership, the Undocupoets Fellowship awards two $500 fellowships to former or current undocumented poets in support of poetry-related costs.
