= Javier Zamora =

American poet

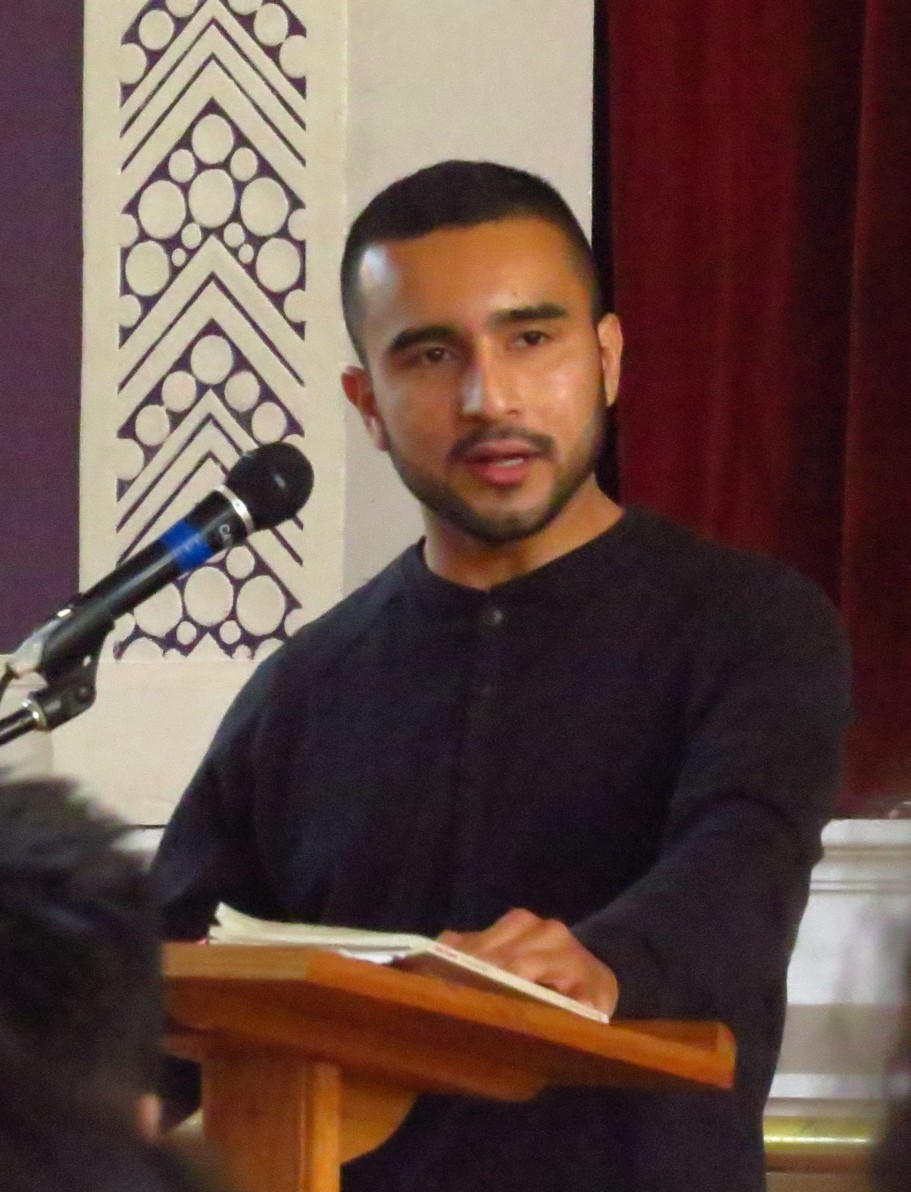
- Zamora, reading at Sacred Heart School, Washington, D.C. 2018
- Born: 1990 (age 35–36); San Luis La Herradura, El Salvador
- Education: University of California, Berkeley (BA); New York University (MFA)
- Spouse: Jo Blair Cipriano
- Writing career
- Language: English, Spanish
- Genres: Poetry, Prose
- Notable works: Unaccompanied, Solito, Nine Immigrant Years
- Notable awards: Wallace Stegner Fellow, NEA Fellow, Lannan Foundation Fellow, Ruth Lilly Fellow, Radcliffe Institute Fellow at Harvard University
- Website: javierzamora.net

Javier Zamora (born 1990) is a Nawat Salvadoran poet and activist. Zamora is the author of Nine Immigrant Years (2011), Unaccompanied (2017), and Solito: A Memoir (2022). He has written works related towards his migration to the United States.

== Early life ==
Zamora was born in San Luis La Herradura, El Salvador in 1990. When he was a year old, his father fled El Salvador due to the US-funded Salvadoran Civil War (1980-1992). His mother followed her husband’s footsteps in 1995 when Javier was about to turn five. Zamora was left at the care of his grandparents who helped raise him until he migrated to the US when he was nine. His first poetry collection, Unaccompanied, explores some of these themes.

In his memoir, Solito, Javier retells his nine-week odyssey across Guatemala, Mexico, and eventually through the Sonoran Desert. He travelled unaccompanied by boat, bus, and foot. After a coyote abandoned his group in Oaxaca, Javier managed to make it to Arizona with the aid of other migrants.

Zamora is the winner of a 2024 Whiting Fellowship and the 2022 LA Times-Christopher Isherwood Prize. He holds fellowships from CantoMundo, Colgate University (Olive B. O'Connor), MacDowell, Macondo, the National Endowment for the Arts, Poetry Foundation (Ruth Lilly), Stanford University (Stegner), and Yaddo. He is the recipient of a 2018-2019 Harvard Radcliffe Institute Fellowship at Harvard University, a 2017 Lannan Literary Fellowship, the 2017 Narrative Prize, the 2016 Barnes & Noble Writer for Writers Award for his work in the Undocupoets Campaign.

== Education ==
After attending The Branson School, he earned a BA in History at the University of California, Berkeley and an MFA at New York University and was a 2016–2018 Wallace Stegner Fellow at Stanford University. At the University of California, Berkeley Zamora pursued his degree and taught in June Jordan's Poetry for the People program. This was founded by June Jordan in 1991 and is intended to serve as an arts and activism program. The programs academic focus is teaching about reading, writing, poetry and building community.

== Career ==
Zamora's chapbook Nueve Años Inmigrantes/Nine Immigrant Years won the 2011 Organic Weapon Arts Contest, and his first poetry collection, Unaccompanied, was published in 2017 by Copper Canyon Press. His poetry can be found in The American Poetry Review, Best New Poets 2013, Kenyon Review, Narrative Magazine, The New Republic, The New York Times, Ploughshares, and Poetry.

Javier Zamora was a Harvard Radcliffe Institute Fellow from 2018 to 2019. During that time, he worked on a project titled 1999 & Other Poems and began work for what would become his debut memoir, SOLITO.

Zamora writes in English, Spanish, and Salvadoran Caliche.

== Honors ==
Zamora's honors include Barnes & Noble Writer for Writer's Award (2016), Meridian Editors’ Prize, and the Ruth Lilly and Dorothy Sargent Rosenberg Poetry Fellowship from the Poetry Foundation. Zamora has received fellowships from the Bread Loaf Writers' Conference, CantoMundo, Colgate University, The Frost Place, MacDowell Colony, the Macondo Writers Workshop, the Napa Valley Writers' Conference, the National Endowment for the Arts Literature Fellowship in Creative Writing, and Yaddo. In 2017, Zamora was awarded the Narrative Prize for "Sonoran Song," "To the President-Elect," and "Thoughts on the Anniversary of My Crossing the Sonoran Desert". In 2023 he received a PEN Oakland/Josephine Miles Literary Award for Solito: A Memoir. His debut work Solito: A Memoir recounting his journey from Mexico to the Sonoran Desert is a New York Times Bestseller. In 2024 Zamora was the winner of a Whiting Fellowship for Nonfiction Poetry.

== Activism ==
Zamora was a founder, with poets Marcelo Hernandez Castillo and Christopher Soto (AKA Loma), of the Undocupoets campaign which eliminated citizenship requirements from major first poetry book prizes in the United States. "You're really forced into the MFA program, after which you go out and try to find a fellowship and, ideally, a book," Zamora adds. "It's been a trend, and numerous pieces have been written about how the MFA route is problematic since it excludes many individuals of color."

== Publications ==
=== Books ===
- —— (2012). Nueve Años Inmigrantes/Nine Immigrant Years. Organic Weapon Arts. ISBN 9780982710616.
- —— (2017). Unaccompanied. Copper Canyon Press. ISBN 9781556595110.
- —— (2022). Solito: A Memoir. Hogarth Books. ISBN 9780593498064.

=== In anthologies ===
- —— (2018). "Various Poems". In Melissa Tuckey (ed.). Ghost Fishing: An Eco-Justice Poetry Anthology. University of Georgia Press. ISBN 9780820353159.

== Personal life ==
Zamora married writer Jo Blair Cipriano in 2022.

He has expressed that connecting with nature and birding have helped him on his healing journey.
