= Some Feelings =

Studio album by Julia Nunes
- Released: September 25, 2015
- Recorded: 2014
- Genre: Folk pop; pop
- Label: Rude Butler Records

Julia Nunes chronology
| Settle Down (2012) | Some Feelings (2015) |

Some Feelings is the fifth studio album by American singer-songwriter Julia Nunes and was released September 25, 2015.

== Background ==
Nunes moved to Los Angeles in early 2014 and began writing material for her upcoming fifth album. She started crowdsourcing on the website Kickstarter for her fifth album in January 2015, raising $134,000 in one month. In a vlog on her YouTube channel, she explained that any donation would unlock exclusive behind the scenes content of the process of recording and working on the album, in addition to an exclusive T-shirt solely for Kickstarter backers. She added that a special ukulele and matching case was designed for her by KALA Ukuleles for backers.

In June 2015, Nunes posted two snippets of the first two tracks of the album, "Then OK" and "Don't Feel", on her Instagram. She posted a clip of tracks, "Something Bad" and "Better than This" in July 2015.

== Personnel ==
Some Feelings was produced and arranged by Joanna Katcher in Los Angeles.

- Julia Nunes - vocals, ukulele
- Joanna Katcher - keys, programming
- Mike Comite - electric bass
- Adam Christgau - drums, percussion
- Peter Recine - electric guitar

== Track listing ==
| No. | Title | Length |
|---|---|---|
| 1. | "Then OK" | 3:26 |
| 2. | "Don't Feel" | 3:10 |
| 3. | "Something Bad" | 3:15 |
| 4. | "Better than This" | 2:54 |
| 5. | "That Was Us" | 3:54 |
| 6. | "I Don't Want To" | 2:53 |
| 7. | "All the Same" | 3:43 |
| 8. | "Cool Thanks" | 3:08 |
| 9. | "Locked in My Mind" | 2:56 |
| 10. | "Make Out" | 2:51 |
| 11. | "Fondly Enough" | 5:28 |
