= Solito: A Memoir =

2022 memoir by Javier Zamora

- Author: Javier Zamora
- Language: English
- Publisher: Hogarth
- Publication date: 6 September 2022
- Pages: 400
- ISBN: 978-0-593-49806-4

Solito: A Memoir is a memoir by Javier Zamora, published on September 6, 2022, by Hogarth Press. The memoir tells a story of a nine-year-old boy on his journey from a small town in El Salvador to the United States to reunite with his parents.

== Themes ==
Solito explores themes such as longing for the family he left behind in El Salvador, the journey of migration, and the relationships formed along the way. The desert, a recurring motif in his writing, is depicted with dual significance: as a source of sustenance and concealment for those undertaking the journey, and as a site of profound danger and hardships.

The memoir further explores themes of love, friendship, and solidarity, presenting the journey not only as a source of grief and danger. The narrative, offered from a child's perspective, introduces additional layers, including themes of past-making, the interplay of fiction and reality, and the unique ways children perceive and interpret the world. The theme of language, developed through Javier's perception of the differences between Mexican and Salvadorian Spanish is another recurring feature of the memoir.

== Summary ==
=== Chapter 1 ===
The story of Solito begins in La Herradura, El Salvador on March 16, 1999. Through a phone call, Javier finds out he will be departing to join his parents in the U.S. after being apart for four years. On Jueves Santo, Don Chepe and Javier walk to Javier's catholic school to excuse Javier's absence in order to avoid being suspected. They lie to the nuns and tell them that Javier will miss school because of a vacation. Javier prepares to leave by giving away some of his toys to his friends. He is told he will be traveling with the same coyote as his mother. Javier's mother and father worked in the U.S. and saved up to hire a coyote for Javier’s trip. Migrant family reunifications can take a lot of time because of the significant costs involved in hiring coyotes. An estimate of Javier's coyote services is about 300 American dollars. Javier finally departed on his journey on April 6, 1999. On that morning, Javier gets ready to leave with the help of Don Chepe, Tia Mali, and Abuelita. He says his goodbyes and receives a blessing before leaving to meet the coyote.

=== Chapter 2 ===
Chapter two begins in Tecun Uman, Guatemala on April 6, 1999. Javier and Don Chepe meet Don Dago the coyote at the bus terminal. They meet the others in their group also traveling to the U.S. Javier is scared of Marcelo, who also happens to be from the same hometown, but Don Chepe tells him to follow Marcelo. They make it to Guatemala and they get on a bicitaxi. They make it to a storefront where they will spend the night and they all get to introduce themselves. Don Chepe introduces himself and Javier to the group and asks that they care for Javier once he leaves. Don Dago gives the group a fake Mexican ID to memorize. They get delayed leaving to Mexico for two weeks and Marcelo threatens Don Dago. Javier and Don Chepe call their family to tell them they will be crossing to Mexico the next day. The next day, Javier hugs his grandfather goodbye and they both get emotional. Javier is now alone. He gets on the bus to go to Mexico with Don Dago and the rest of the group.

=== Chapter 3 ===
Chapter three begins in Ocos, Guatemala on April 17, 1999. Javier is sharing a room with Patricia and Carla because he is too scared to be around the men of the group. Travel plans are changed last minute and instead of taking the bus to Mexico, they will be taking boats to get there. They get on the boats and Javier notices Marta is not there anymore. The long bumpy boat ride makes them get sick. People are throwing up and it's cold and dark. Patricia helps keep Javier warm. They make it to Mexico after hours of being in bumpy water.

=== Chapter 4 ===
Chapter four begins in Oaxaca, Mexico on April 29, 1999. They arrive at a motel and get ready in less than three minutes each. Don Dago is not there, they have a new coyote. They get on a bus to go to Mexico City. They all get caught at a checkpoint on the bus and are kicked off. The officers take their belongings and they are searched at gunpoint. The officers ask them to pay a bribe so that they won’t get deported. After a physical altercation occurs, the coyote pays the officers off and the group is left to walk on the road for hours. Marcelo teaches the group English curse words and they cuss as they walk. Two strangers in a grey vehicle pick them up from the side of the road and they start driving to Acapulco.

=== Chapter 5 ===
Chapter 5 begins in Acapulco, Mexico on April 29, 1999. Upon arriving in Acapulco, Javier and the group stay in a cramped hotel room. Patricia takes care of Javier and Carla while also maintaining the room clean. For protection, the group remains inside the hotel room during the day, watching TV and eating meals provided by the coyote. The group then travels by bus to Guadalajara, Mexico. Once there, they are taken to an apartment where they must hide for six days. During these days, the men spend their time smoking and watching TV while Patricia, Carla, and Javier spend their time resting. At the end of their stay, they prepare to leave, with instructions to dress neatly for their travel day to avoid drawing unwanted attention at checkpoints from authorities.

=== Chapter 6 ===
Chapter 6 begins in Guadalajara, Mexico on May 22, 1999. Javier and the group prepare to leave the apartment and head to Mazatlán, the next stage of their journey to the U.S. border. The group travels by bus and continues to fake their identity as a family, with Patricia pretending to be Javier's mother and Carla acting as his sister. The group passes through several checkpoints and manages to avoid being caught by soldiers. At one checkpoint, soldiers step inside the bus, ask passengers for their documents and interrogate them. Patricia, Carla and Javier provide their documents and pass the inspections. The soldiers drag Marcelo outside the bus for questioning, causing distress among the group who fear being caught by soldiers. Marcelo is later let back into the bus, visibly shaken and upset by the experience. After arriving in Nogales, they get some food and meet their new coyotes or polleros, who explain the next steps of the journey.

=== Chapter 7 ===
Chapter 7 begins in Nogales, Sonora on May 29, 1999. Javier and the others prepare to start their journey across the border. The group makes sure to eat twice a day: a late breakfast and an early dinner with a sandwich if they are hungrier. New fake papers are created for the group stating that Chino is Javier’s “father”. The coyote provides two cans of tuna and two jugs of water for each person to help them survive the long desert journey. The group sets off on their long walk through the desert, facing obstacles like Patricia getting caught in the wire of a fence as they try to cross it. At the next stop, the group rests and discovers that Marcelo has stolen their supplies and abandoned them. As the group rests and falls asleep, they are caught by La Migra and detained. The group lies to La Migra claiming that they are all family and from Mexico. The officer warns them that if they try to cross again, they will be incarcerated for 10 years. The group is separated into men and women. Javier is the only child in the men's room. The conditions in the detention room are poor, with only one sink and one toilet open to everyone. Javier faces harsh conditions in detention, unable to use the restroom due to stress, without his belongings, and eventually falls asleep against the cold wall, exhausted and emotionally drained. After questioning, Patricia, Carla, and Javier are deported back to Mexico, leaving Chino behind. The three wait for Chino to also get deported to Mexico as well so they can go to a shelter. At the shelter, the group receives basic care like water, food, soup, toothbrushes, and towels. Chino makes a call to Mario and the group gets some rest before preparing to cross the border once again.

=== Chapter 8 ===
Chapter 8 begins in Mexico on June 2, 1999. After a brief rest, Javier and the group make their second attempt to cross the border. This time, the journey is difficult and marked by greater uncertainty and exhaustion, but the group remains determined. The group face difficult terrain, intensive heat, and scarcity of water but maintain determination to succeed. Early in their journey, a helicopter forces the group to scatter. The group manages to escape, but Patricia gets injured by a cactus’ needles that pierces her skin. Chino helps Patrica remove the needles, and the group decides to continue their journey. Later on, the pollero that was leading the group injures his ankle causing the group to slow down. After not being able to continue, the pollero decided to remain behind, leaving the group to proceed without him with the guidance of other polleros. On the third night, the group reaches a house where they are confronted by a man with a gun that calls the authorities. A uniformed officer arrives and instructs Patricia, Carla, Chino, and Javier to get inside his truck. He questions them about how many times they have attempted crossing the border. The uniformed officer then offers them food, water, and medical assistance. The officer is able to take care of Patricia’s injuries and reassure the group that they will not be detained. Instead, the officer drives them to the border and instructs them to walk towards Mexico, which they do.

=== Chapter 9 ===
Chapter 9 begins in Mexico on June 7, 1999. Javier and the group prepare for their final attempt to cross the border after a few days of rest. This time, the group faces fewer obstacles and resistance, with no helicopters or other immediate threats. The group finally reaches the border and waits for the signal, three honks from a van, to let them know they are being picked up. When the signal comes, the group sprints to the van and quickly get inside. They are relieved to finally have made it across the desert. Upon arrival at the safe house in Tucson, Arizona, the house is filled with other migrants. The coyote contacts Javier’s parents, requesting $1,500 for his release, and confirms that they will soon pick him up. Javier learns that Patricia, Carla, and Chino will be going to Virginia and will be leaving before him. Before departing, they have arranged another mother and her son in the safe house to take care of Javier. He says goodbye to his found family and prepares for a reunion with his parents. The next morning, he waits for his parents. Finally, his name is called, and Javier sees his parents in the doorway of the safe house. Javier’s seven-week journey with his parents is finally within reach.

== Characters ==
Throughout the novel, Zamora introduces the audience to many characters that play important roles in Javier's journey. These characters give the audience insight into the lives of immigrants and the immigrant experience.

=== Javier ===
Javier Zamora is the protagonist of this memoir and writes from the perspective of his childhood self. Javier's character has to leave the school he loves to begin his journey of joining his parents in the U.S. Javier experiences having a crush, hunger, danger, and the fear of being taken back to El Salvador throughout his journey. His experience, although dangerous, is light-hearted and humorous being told through a child's perspective.

=== Tía Mali ===
Tía Mali is Javier's mother's sister. She has a close relationship with Javier and oftentimes tells him about her dating experiences and gossip. She is described as having stinky feet.

=== Patricia ===
Patricia is Javier's mother figure during his trip. Her daughter, Carla, is jealous of this relationship at times. Patricia tends to Carla and Javier and she pretends to be his mother during dangerous situations.

=== Chino ===
Chino, the father figure for Javier during his trip, helps Javier, Patricia, and Carla by being the male figure to protect them from potential danger. He is from the same hometown as Patricia and Carla.

=== Carla ===
Carla is Patricia's daughter who speaks about being reunited with her father and sibling. She does not like Javier at times but he has a crush on her.

=== Javier’s Father ===
Javier's father lives in the U.S. with Javier's mother. Javier's father migrated from El Salvador because of the political climate, after his older brother and sister-in-law were disappeared and murdered by the U.S.-funded right-wing government. The homicide rate in El Salvador the year the memoir took place was 65 per 100,000.

=== Javier’s Mother ===
Javier's mother moved to the U.S. because of the country's high femicide rate and lack of financial and educational opportunity for her in El Salvador. She was one of 465,433 Salvadoreans who migrated to the U.S. in the 1990s, which was when Solito took place.

=== Don Chepe ===
Don Chepe is Javier's grandfather. He used to have a drinking problem and would get aggressive. Increases in political conflict can lead to the likelihood of alcoholism and violent behaviors. Javier mentions these aggressive outbursts throughout the novel. Don Chepe likes to dress nicely whenever leaving his home and cares about Javier deeply.

=== Abuelita Neli ===
Abuelita Neli is Javier's grandmother and is depicted as a homemaker. She cooks, cleans, and tends for the family.

=== Don Dago ===
Don Dago is described as a mysterious person and not much is said about him. He is Javier's initial coyote. A coyote is a person who helps smuggle immigrants into the United States.

=== Marcelo ===
Marcelo is from Javier's hometown. Don Chepe tells Javier to stay close to Marcelo during the trip but Javier does not trust Marcelo. Marcelo has tattoos that make him intimidating to Javier.

=== Chele ===
Chele is part of the original group of migrants He gets along with Marcelo, but is later betrayed by him.

=== Marta ===
Marta is part of the initial group but she disappeared without explanation. It was suspected that she disappeared with Don Dago and was a romantic interest to him.

== Reception ==
The Kirkus wrote in a review "The harrowing journey of a 9-year-old Salvadoran boy through Guatemala and Mexico to rejoin his parents in the U.S." The review praises Solito for its engaging, fiction-like quality, describing it as a "page-turner narrative". Zamora is stated to create fully realized depictions of his fellow travelers, while making the overall memoir easily accessible and vibrant.

The Los Angeles Times wrote in a review "In his new memoir, “Solito,” Zamora recounts his days crossing the scorching Sonoran Desert, getting detained by Border Patrol agents, meeting strangers along the way who protected him." In the interview, Zamora told that his therapist played an important role in writing the memoir: "I would have therapy in the morning, then I would try to write because it would unlock a memory." Dreams were another source of recollected details for Zamora.

The Washington Post wrote in a review "This memoir, “Solito,” which means “alone” in Spanish, recounts in gripping and graphic detail his boyhood travels to Gringolandia, that mythic land of big dreams and Big Macs." The article highlights imagery present in the novel, including smells and tastes that add to reader's experience. A book serves as a reminder of "how immigrants like Javier Zamora enrich our culture". Zamora's writing is praised for being economic and eloquent. The article criticizes Solito for excessively long narration and abundance of untranslated Spanish phrases.

The New York Times author Karla Villavicencio acclaimed Solito for being a beautiful and important work, calling Javier Zamora someone who “writes like someone who cannot afford to forget”. Villavicencio states that the topic of migration, often reused by novelists and reporters, feels fresh in Zamora's writing thanks to child's perspective. She also highlights the limitation of such perspective, mainly lack of understanding of adult actions by the narrator. The article describes Javier Zamora's transition from poetry to prose as "a gamble that clearly pays off".

It was the September 2022 Today Show Read with Jenna book club pick.

Solito was compared to Gulwali Passarlay’s The Lightless Sky by The Big Issue due to similar themes of child refugee and migrant experience. The article highlights Solito's unexpected humor and lively dialogues throughout the memoir, as opposed to expected "self-pity and didacticism" characteristic for migrant writing. Solito's main character, Javier, is named "a delightful companion" and someone who the reader can easily empathize with.

An article published by University of Montevallo by Leonor Vázquez Gonzáles, states that Javier Zamora's novel represents a new phase in the literature of migration, showing an internal perspective through the eyes of a child. The memoir is a testament to hope, illustrating unique solidarity in the face of adversity. It highlights the role of the power of unity and claims that the memoir has the potential to raise global awareness about traumatic experiences such as that of Javier Zamora.
