= Undocupoets =

Group of poets

The Undocupoets are a group of poets who are current or former undocumented immigrants in the United States. The mission of the Undocupoets is to bring recognition to the work written by undocumented poets and to spread awareness about the societal barriers they face as writers. The group was founded in 2015 by Castillo, Javier Zamora, and Christopher Soto, a.k.a. Loma. Undocupoets united to petition against citizenship requirements in book prizes, but have grown to include a fellowship and more. It is currently co-organized by poets Marcelo Hernandez Castillo, Janine Joseph, and Esther Lin.

== First book petition ==
In 2015, the Undocupoets published a petition with the literary journal Apogee, with over 400 signatures from writers, readers, editors, and organizers. The point of this petition was to encourage major literary presses to remove the "proof of citizenship" requirement from their first book contests. "As an undocumented person, it’s ingrained in you to read the fine print, so I knew from the time I got serious about writing that many contests barred us from entering ... It was out of anger and disbelief that no one else seemed to know about these exclusions that we [Hernandez Castillo and fellow cofounders Christopher Soto and Javier Zamora] started circulating the petition. From there it snowballed." The petition was focused on eleven press prizes including: Letras Latinas (Andres Montoya Poetry Prize), BOA Editions, the National Poetry Series, the Academy of American Poets, Persea Books, the Poetry Society of America, the Poetry Foundation, Sarabande Books, Crab Orchard Review, and Yale University Press. Many prizes ended up changing their requirements, including the National Poetry Series, who said, "What really persuaded us is the fact that we did share the desire to find the best poetry out there and help get it published, which is one of the hardest things to do.” In 2016, they were awarded the Barnes and Noble Writers for Writers Award for their work.

== Fellowships ==
After the success of their campaign, the Undocupoets expanded their mission to include a fellowship in partnership with Sibling Rivalry Press. The fellowship provides financial support and mentorship to emerging poets who are undocumented or formerly undocumented, helping to amplify their voices and create a platform for their work. The initiative aims to dismantle barriers in the literary world and foster a more inclusive creative space. Applicants for their fellowship have hailed from the Philippines, China, Mexico, Brazil and beyond. Despite the risk of proclaiming undocumented status by applying for the fellowship, submissions have doubled yearly since 2017.

In 2015, Southern Humanities Review created a feature on undocumented writers, inspired by the Undocupoets. The feature brought attention to the experiences of writers navigating the challenges of undocumented status, showing the intersection between immigration and literary expression. “We’re always the subject of people’s stories,” said Yosimar Reyes, a 2017 Undocupoets fellow and DACA recipient. “I don’t think it’s ever occurred to people that we are also writers, thinkers, philosophers, and that we’re actually the agents of our own stories.” Additionally, the fellowship inspired similar programs and conversations within the literary community, such as other journals and presses examining their inclusivity practices.

== Previous and Current Fellows ==
- Beatriz Yanes Martinez
- José Felipe Ozuna
- Claudia Rojas
- Jesús I. Valles
- Frankie Concepcion
- Aline Mello
- Jan-Henry Gray
- Tobi Kassim
- laurel c.
- Juan Rodriguez
- Anni Liu
- Oswaldo Varvas
- Yosimar Reyes
- Wo Chan

== Opening Availability and Achievements ==
The Undocupoets have continued to participate in the literary world to help expand the availability and opportunity for people to take part in poetry/literary contests. Examples of such include:

- Manuscripts must be original and in English by a poet who resides in the U.S. to be considered for the Andres Montoya Poetry Prize and Red Hen Poetry Prize by Letras Latinas.
- The Yale Series of Younger Poets by the Yale University Press now is open to those who have not published a book of poetry yet and reside in the U.S.
- Crab Orchard will now begin to include people who have DACA/TPS status as those eligible for their poetry contests. Poetry must be original and unpublished.
- BOA Editions, which controls the A Poulin Jr. Poetry Prize, now will allow poetry entrants from those who have DACA status, Temporary Protected Status, or Legal Permanent Status.
- Academy of American Poets will begin to allow individuals with DACA, TPS, or LPS status. Also, they state, "or any subsequent categories designated by the U.S. authorities as conferring similar enhanced status upon non-citizens living in the United States." By stating this, the Academy of American Poets opens availability to the niches of groups that are undocumented in this country.
- Undocupoets went on to campaign for the Pulitzer Prize to begin accepting submissions regarding Fiction, Biography, Memoir, Poetry, and General Nonfiction by noncitizens.
- Sarabande Books, which hosts The Kathryn A. Morton Prize in Poetry, stated that all Undocupoets will be allowed to participate in present and future contests.
- American Poetry Review and Poetry Society of America have both agreed to change their guidelines for their Honickman First Book Prize in Poetry and Chapbook Fellowship from "U.S. Resident" to "U.S. citizens or any person currently residing within the U.S."

Through the Undocupoets organizations, there has been a shift in poetry contest eligibility. Organizations are beginning to consider and integrate people who reside in the United States without citizenship status.
