= Nataly Dawn =

American musician (born 1986)

Nataly Dawn Conte
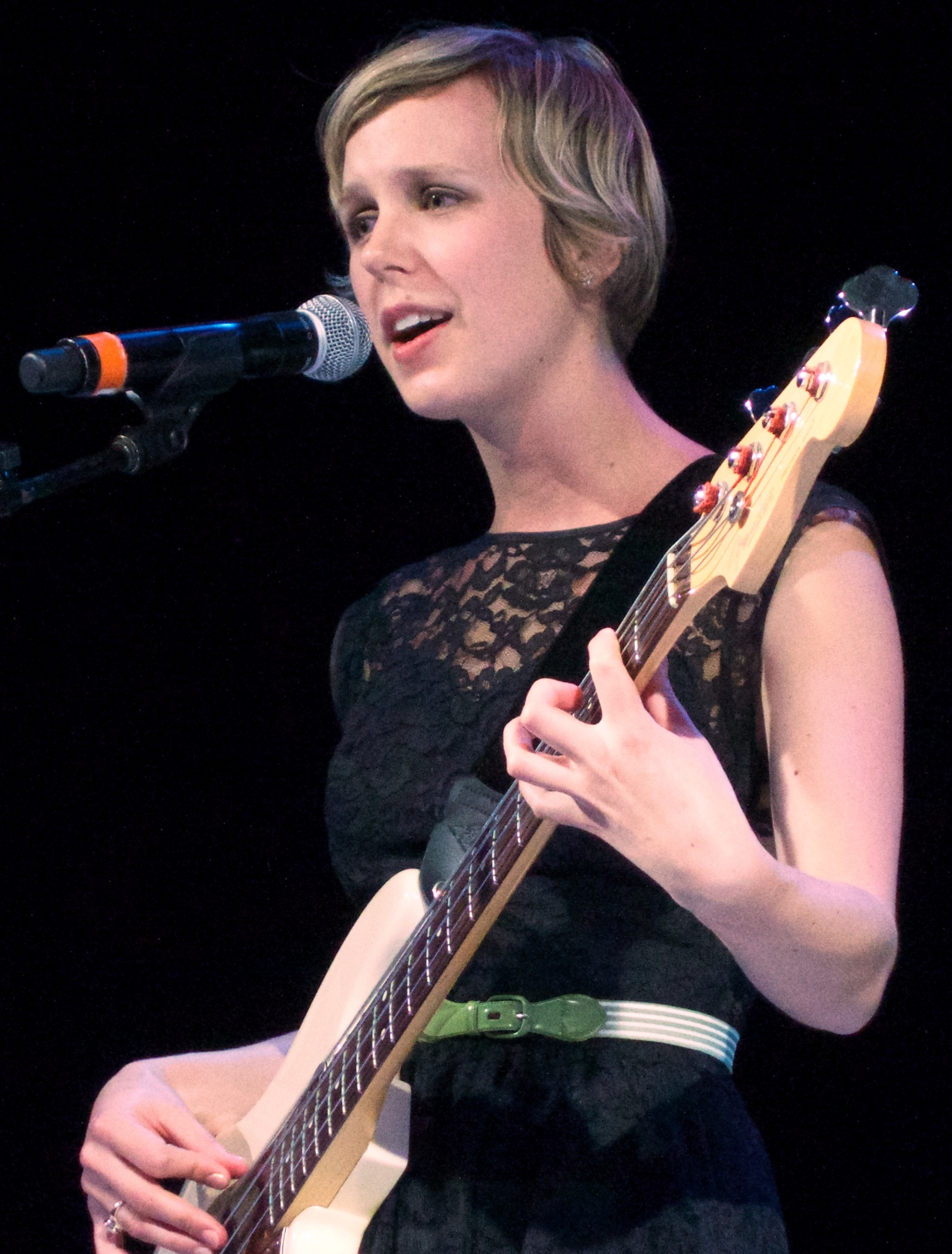
- Dawn in 2014
- Born: October 29, 1986 (age 40)
- Education: Stanford University
- Occupations: Singer-songwriter; musician
- Years active: 2008–present
- Spouse: Jack Conte (m. 2016)
- Musical career
- Genres: Pop rock; blue-eyed soul; vocal jazz; indie folk; indie pop
- Instruments: Vocals; keyboards; bass guitar; guitar; percussion
- Label: Nonesuch
- Member of: Pomplamoose; My Terrible Friend

YouTube information
- Channel: Nataly Dawn
- Years active: 2008–present
- Genres: Music; vlogging
- Subscribers: 158 thousand
- Views: 17.3 million
- Last updated: June 19, 2026
- Website: natalydawnmusic.com

Nataly Dawn Conte (born October 29, 1986) is an American singer-songwriter and musician. She is one half of the duo Pomplamoose with her husband Jack Conte and has released four studio albums and four EPs, in addition to numerous collaborations with other artists.

== Early life ==
A daughter of missionaries, Dawn spent her childhood in Europe and attended schools in France and Belgium before she returned to the United States to study art and French literature at Stanford University.

== Music career ==
=== Pomplamoose ===
At Stanford, Dawn met Jack Conte and formed Pomplamoose, eventually performing, recording, and editing songs and videos in their Northern California home. Their first song "Hail Mary" was featured on the front page of YouTube. In 2009, the duo began releasing cover versions of pop songs like Beyoncé's "Single Ladies (Put a Ring on It)" and Michael Jackson's "Beat It".

=== Solo work ===
==== Her Earlier Stuff (2009–2011) ====
In 2009, Dawn released her first studio album, Her Earlier Stuff, comprising twelve songs which were posted to her YouTube channel over the preceding two years.

In 2010, in collaboration with Lauren O'Connell, Dawn formed the side project, My Terrible Friend. In May 2011, it was announced that she would be joining Barry Manilow on his album 15 Minutes, contributing vocals to the track "Letter from a Fan / So Heavy, So High".

==== How I Knew Her (2011–2015) ====
On July 17, 2011, Dawn announced she would be releasing a new album. She started a funding campaign on Kickstarter, where the initial goal of $20,000 was reached in just three days. On September 6, 2011, the album funding campaign was finalized with a grand total of $104,788.

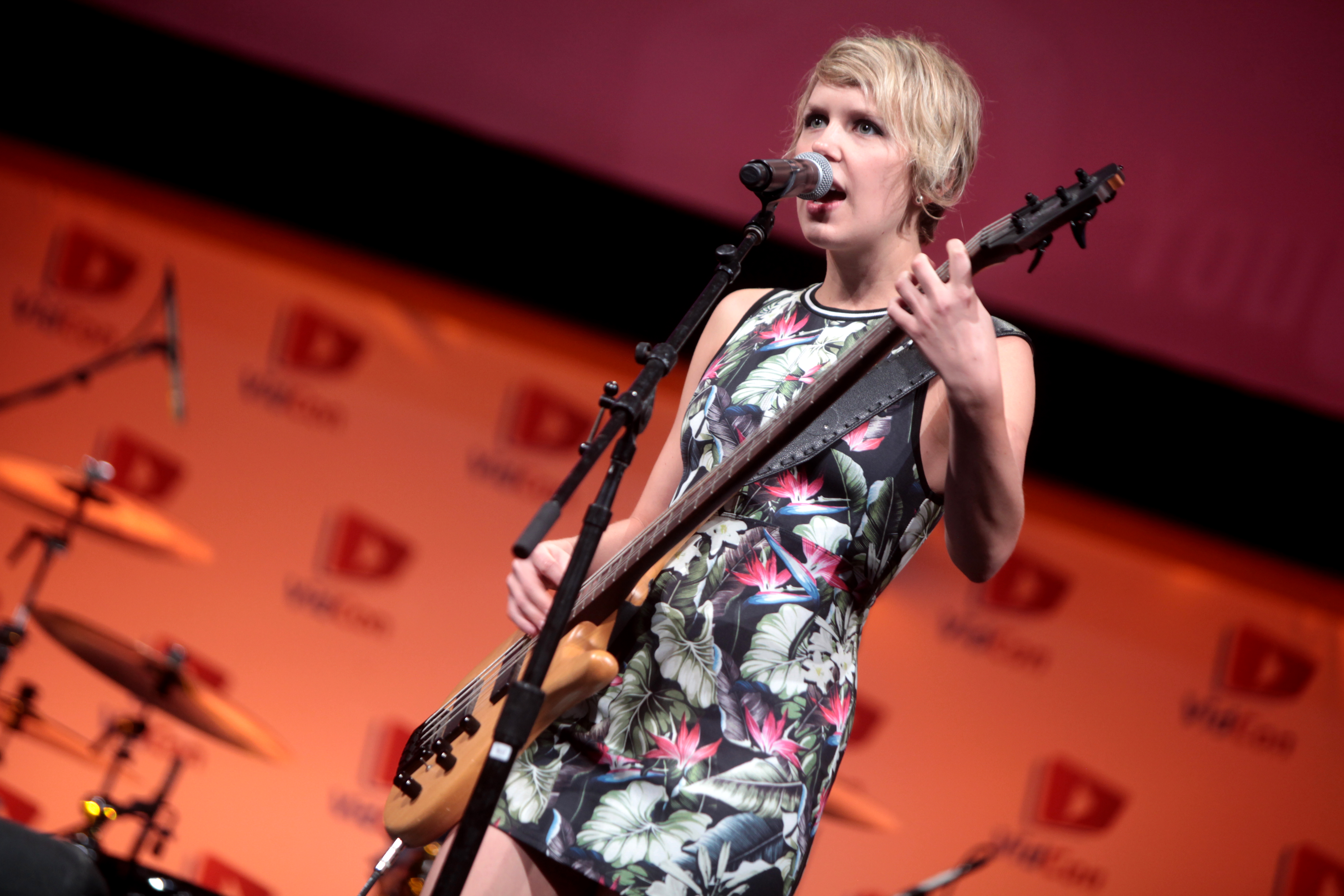
Dawn in 2014

In August 2012, Dawn signed as a solo artist to Nonesuch Records, which released her Kickstarter-funded album, How I Knew Her, on February 12, 2013. The album was produced by Jack Conte and recorded at Prairie Sun Recording Studios in Cotati, California, in December 2011, with a full band which included Conte, Ryan Lerman, David Piltch, Louis Cole, and Matt Chamberlain. Oz Fritz engineered the album with Conte; it was mixed by Mike Mogis and mastered by Bob Ludwig.

==== Haze (2016–2021) ====
On October 29, 2016, Dawn released her third album, Haze.

On April 23, 2019, Dawn released her third extended play, For You. Later in 2019, her cover of "Careless Whisper" was featured in the fifth episode of HBO's Watchmen.

On May 18, 2021, Dawn released a personal update on the Pomplamoose YouTube channel in which she stated she was diagnosed with basal-cell carcinoma, a form of skin cancer, which was caught early. Along with the health update, she stated that she would be recording a new solo record in the same month. After her procedure, she stated she would be taking a few months off.

==== Gardenview (2022–present) ====
On March 1, 2022, Dawn released her first single since 2019 entitled "Follow the Light." On March 24, "Over the Moon" was the second single released. Also on March 24, it was announced that these singles would be on her forthcoming fourth album Gardenview, with a release date of June 3. On April 7, the third single along with the video for Danny was released. On April 28, the fourth single "Joy" was released. On May 12, the fourth single "Have You Heard" was released. On May 19, the fifth single "Afternoon Tea" was released. The video for "Joy" was released on June 3, the day the album was released.

== Personal life ==
Dawn became engaged to Jack Conte in January 2016 and married in May 2016. On May 18, 2021, she announced she was diagnosed with basal-cell carcinoma.

== Discography ==
Nataly Dawn discography
- Studio albums: 4
- Extended plays: 4
- Singles: 56
- Music videos: 4

=== Albums ===
==== Studio albums ====
Title	Details
Her Earlier Stuff	Released: October 1, 2009; Label: Self-released; Format: Digital download
How I Knew Her (Note: How I Knew Her peaked at No. 10 on Billboard's Americana/Folk Albums.)	Released: February 12, 2013; Label: Nonesuch Records; Format: Vinyl, CD, digital download
Haze	Released: October 29, 2016; Label: Nataly Dawn Music; Format: Vinyl, CD, digital download
Gardenview	Release: June 3, 2022; Label: Nataly Dawn Music; Format: Digital download, streaming

=== Extended plays ===
Title	Details
Easier Said Than Done (Ryan Lerman and Nataly Dawn)	Released: October 1, 2012; Label: Self-released; Format: Digital download
The Coldplay EP	Released: March 2, 2017; Label: Self-released; Format: Digital download
For You	Released: April 23, 2019; Label: Self-released; Format: Vinyl, CD, digital download

=== As lead artist ===
Title	Year	Album
"The Christmas Ballad"	2013	Non-album singles
"Marshmallow World" (with Ryan Lerman)	2014	Non-album singles
"Snow"	2015	Non-album singles
"You Wouldn't Like Me	2015	Non-album singles
"Baby Baby"	2015	Non-album singles
"My Life Would Suck Without You"	2015	Non-album singles
"Waters of March" (with Carlos Cabrera)	2015	Non-album singles
"Edelweiss"	2015	Non-album singles
"Hello"	2016	Non-album singles
"Love Yourself"	2016	Non-album singles
"No (90s Mashup)" (featuring Kina Grannis)	2016	Non-album singles
"Bridge over Troubled Water"	2016	Non-album singles
"New Romantics" (featuring Kurt Hugo Schneider)	2016	Non-album singles
"Suis-moi" (featuring Cyrille Aimée)"	2016	Non-album singles
"We Still Got Us" (featuring David Choi)	2016	Non-album singles
"Sleigh Ride" (featuring Clara C)	2016	Non-album singles
"The Christmas Song" (featuring Kina Grannis)	2016	Non-album singles
"Careless Whisper"	2017	Non-album singles
"Shape of You/This Town (British Mashup)"	2017	Non-album singles
"Maybe a Love Song"	2017	Non-album singles
"Unchained Melody" (featuring Imaginary Future)	2017	Non-album singles
"Bye Bye Baby"	2017	Non-album singles
"That's What I Like"	2017	Non-album singles
"Make Believe"	2017	Non-album singles
"Symphony" (with Sheriffs of Schroedingham)	2017	Non-album singles
"Over the Rainbow" (with Sheriffs of Schroedingham)	2017	Non-album singles
"My Cherie Amour"	2017	Non-album singles
"Passionfruit" (with Sheriffs of Schroedingham)	2017	Non-album singles
"Sick of Losing Soulmates" (with Sheriffs of Schroedingham)	2017	Non-album singles
"Never Going Back Again" (with Sheriffs of Schroedingham)	2017	Non-album singles
"Stayin' Alive"	2017	Non-album singles
"As the World Unwinds" (featuring Rigbi)	2017	Non-album singles
"The Lesser I Know" (featuring Sarah Clanton)	2017	Non-album singles
"Chained to the Rhythm" (featuring Sarah Clanton)	2017	Non-album singles
"Raindrops Keep Falling on My Head" (featuring Ryan Lerman)	2017	Non-album singles
"Heart of Glass"	2017	Non-album singles
"Come on to Me" (featuring David Choi)	2017	Non-album singles
"Pick Up Your Feet"	2017	Non-album singles
"All I Want for Christmas Is You" (featuring Cyrille Aimée)	2017	Non-album singles
"It Came Upon a Midnight Clear"	2017	Non-album singles
"Here, There and Everywhere"	2018	Non-album singles
"For You"	2019	For You
"Young Pilgrims"	2019	Non-album single
"Dog"	2019	For You
"Alternative Universe (The Story of Joe)"	2019	For You
"Huckleberry"	2019	For You
"Samson, Roxane, & Me	2019	For You
"Coffee Baby"	2019	For You
"I Can See Clearly Now"	2019	Non-album single
"Follow the Light"	2022	Gardenview
"Over the Moon"	2022	Gardenview
"Danny"	2022	Gardenview
"Joy"	2022	Gardenview
"Have You Heard"	2022	Gardenview
"Afternoon Tea"	2022	Gardenview
"Blue Light" (with Pomplamoose and J.E. Sunde)	2022	Non-album singles
"Next Life" (with Pomplamoose and J.E. Sunde)	2022	Non-album singles
"Why Would You Do That" (with Pomplamoose and J.E. Sunde)	2022	Non-album singles

=== As featured artist ===
Title	Year	Album
"Such Great Heights (Scary Pockets featuring Nataly Dawn)	2022	Magic Hour
"Joy" (Note: This is a stripped down version of Nataly Dawn's original "Joy" which is off her 2022 album Gardenview.) (stories featuring Nataly Dawn)	2022	Vol. 27
"Michelle" (stories featuring Nataly Dawn)	2022	Vol. 28

=== Music videos ===
Year	Title	Album
2013	"Leslie"	How I Knew Her
2019	"For You"	For You
2022	"Danny"	Gardenview
2022	"Joy"	Gardenview

=== Other appearances ===
Title	Year	Credited artist(s)	Album
"Letter from a Fan / So Heavy, So High"	2011	Barry Manilow (featuring Nataly Dawn)	15 Minutes
