= Settle Down (album) =

Studio album by Julia Nunes
- Released: February 28, 2012
- Recorded: 2011
- Genre: Folk pop; pop
- Label: Rude Butler Records

Julia Nunes chronology
Youtube Covers (2010)	Settle Down (2012)	Some Feelings (2015)

Settle Down is the fourth studio album by American singer-songwriter Julia Nunes.

== Background ==
Nunes launched a Kickstarter page for her fourth album on June 11, 2011, . She exceeded her goal of $15,000 in less than a day, receiving over $19,000. The project gathered $77,888 total in donations. The album was released on February 28, 2012.

== Composition ==
"He is Mad", "Pizza", and "I Wasn't Worried" are mini-songs roughly a minute in length, all of which Nunes recorded videos for and posted to YouTube. Other songs, like "Odd", "Balloons", "First Impressions", "Comatose", and "Into the Sunshine" appeared on previous albums, but were re-recorded for Settle Down.

== Promotion ==
Nunes updated the Kickstarter project page with a video of her performing "Stay Awake" in the Kickstarter offices (thanks to the overwhelming success of her campaign). On January 24, 2012, she performed "Stay Awake" on Conan to promote the album.

== Track listing ==
No.	Title	Length
1.	"Stay Awake"	3:07
2.	"Odd"	1:41
3.	"Lullaby"	2:34
4.	"Lookout For Yourself"	2:05
5.	"Nothing's That Great"	3:26
6.	"He is Mad"	0:52
7.	"To the Damsels: Run"	3:06
8.	"Fair Weather"	3:09
9.	"Comatose"	3:24
10.	"Pizza"	0:24
11.	"Maybe I Will"	3:27
12.	"I Will Go Anywhere With You"	4:17
13.	"This Is What I Used To Know"	3:55
14.	"I Wasn't Worried"	0:56
15.	"Balloons"	3:51
16.	"First Impressions"	3:32
17.	"Into The Sunshine"	2:55
18.	"Waiting"	3:37

== Charts ==
Chart (2012)	Peak position
US Top Current Albums (Billboard)	185
US Americana/Folk Albums (Billboard)	9
US Heatseekers Albums (Billboard)	12
US Independent Albums (Billboard)	37
