= Hans Baldauf =

American architect (born 1959)

- Born: New York City
- Education: Yale
- Occupation: Architect
- Awards: Fellow of the American Institute of Architects
- Practice: BCV Architecture + Interiors
- Projects: San Francisco Ferry Building Restoration, Joseph Phelps Vineyards, Cakebread Cellars, Palace of Fine Arts Restoration

Hans Baldauf FAIA LEED AP, (born 20 February 1959) is an American architect with an interest in the crafting of the public realm and of private spaces. He works on a wide range of projects, from large mixed-use master plans to retail stores and single-family residences. In the public realm, Baldauf has been deeply involved in the intersection of design and the sustainable food movement, particularly with the creation of marketplaces and food halls. Baldauf served on the board of directors for the Center for Urban Education about Sustainable Agriculture (CUESA), the organization that runs the renowned Ferry Plaza Farmers Market, and as Board President from 2013-2015. Baldauf’s private residences explore the traditions of construction that are evident in the Bay Tradition in architecture. He classifies himself as part of the Fourth Bay Tradition. Over the past two decades he has written about, lectured on and restored buildings designed by the early pioneers of California's Beaux-Arts movement.

== Education, influences and early work ==
Baldauf obtained a Bachelor of Arts in History, Arts and Letters from Yale in 1981. As an undergraduate he and five other students organized a widely attended conference that examined the economic and cultural problems affecting New Haven, Connecticut. The Third Bay Tradition and the work of Kent Bloomer in particular shaped his artistic development. In his senior thesis, Baldauf focused on the interplay between public and private property reflected in the architectural layout of Sea Ranch, California. He went on to obtain a Master of Architecture degree from Yale in 1988, and soon afterward began the design phase of The Sea Pine House in Sea Ranch while working as a professional architect for Tom Beeby's firm in Chicago.

After two years in Chicago, Hans took the post of visiting assistant professor at the University of Notre Dame's Rome studies program for the 1991–1992 academic year. In addition to his teaching duties in Rome, Hans continued to supervise the construction of the Sea Pine House by flying back to California every six weeks, and sending revised plan details to his contractor via fax machine.

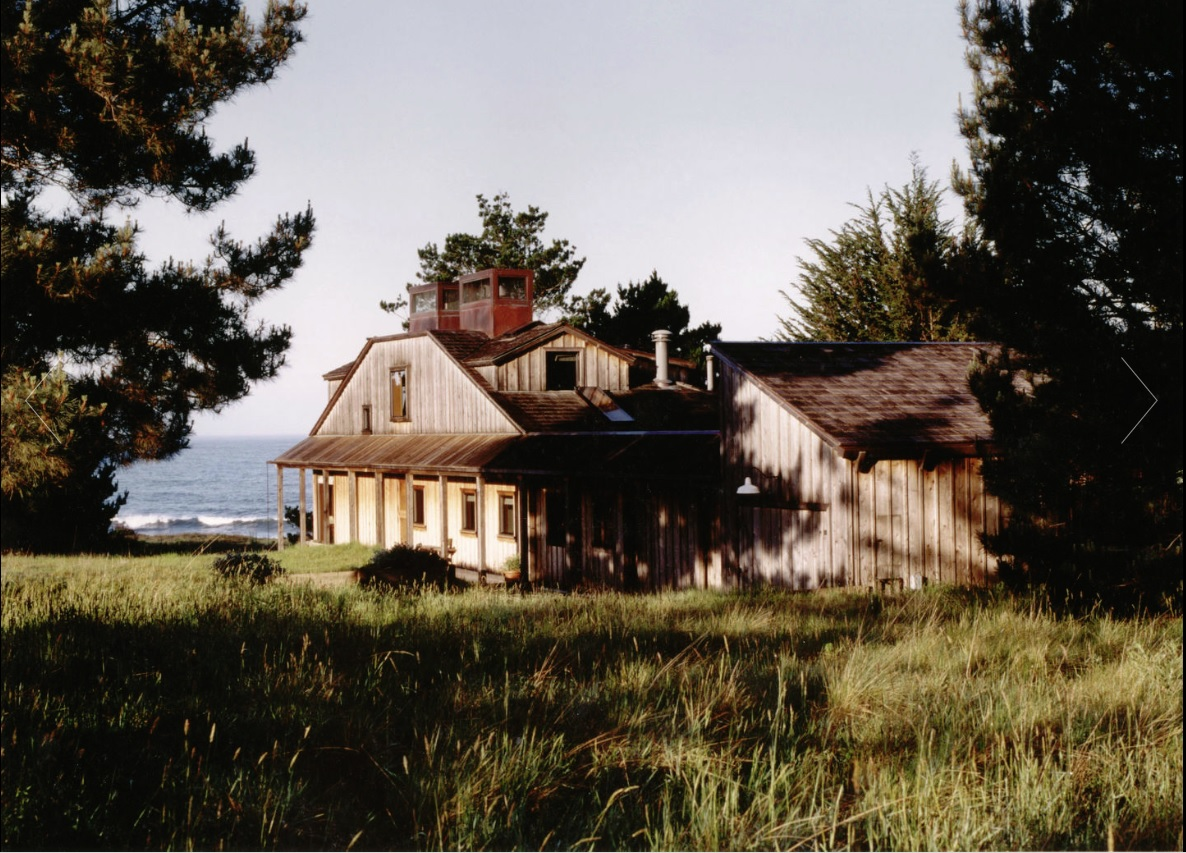
Sea Pine House

In 1992 he returned to the Bay Area, where he secured a position at the San Francisco firm Backen, Arrigoni and Ross (BAR) the same year.

== BCV Architecture + Interiors and Beyond ==
In 1997 Baldauf formed the architecture firm BCV with two former BAR colleagues. The firm was chosen, as part of a diverse team including SMWM and Page & Turnbull, to design the San Francisco Ferry Building Marketplace in 1999. Prior to its restoration the ferry structure had, over the years, grown derelict—standing apart from the modern transportation infrastructure of San Francisco. BCV's vision of a new public market hall included brick arches with custom metal folding gates and a restored historic 660-foot long grand nave.

Between 2012 and 2015, Baldauf led the design of five of Belcampo Meat Co.'s California restaurants and butcher shops.

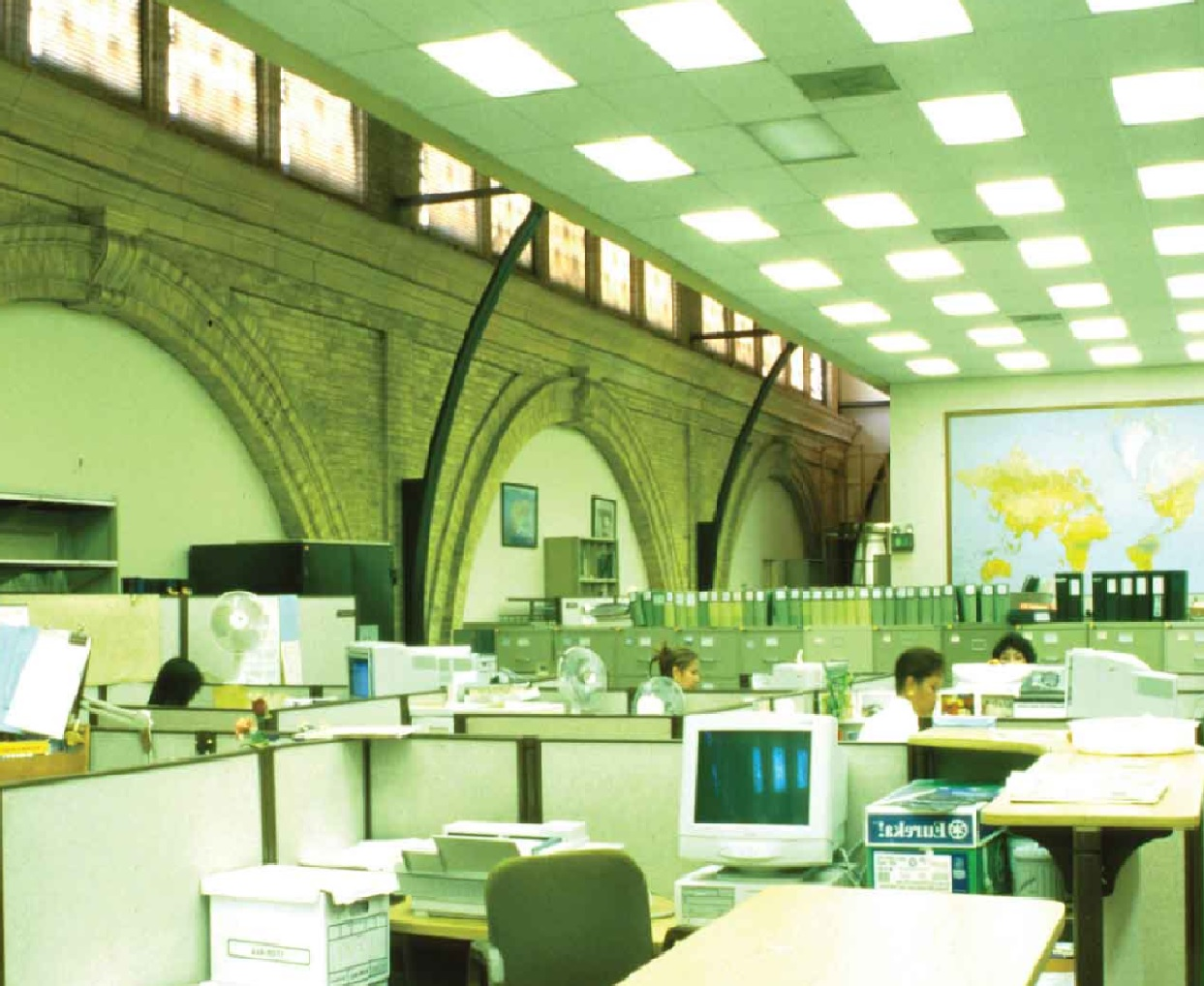
San Francisco Ferry Building pre-restoration

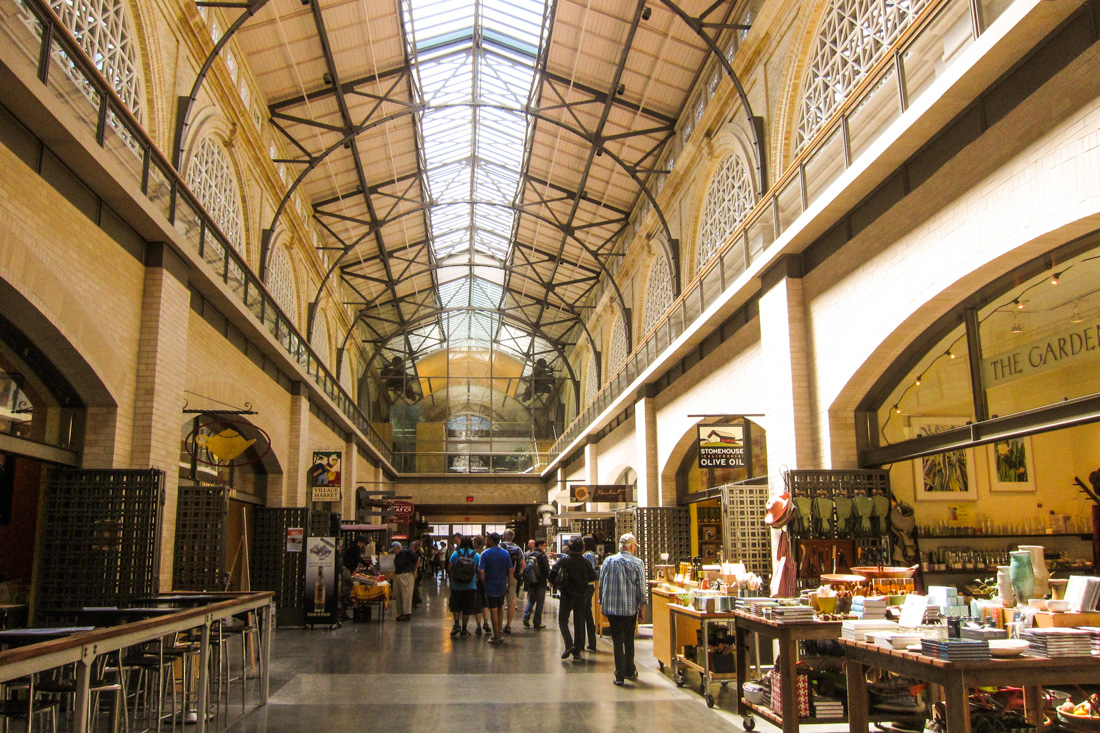
San Francisco Ferry Building interior with exposed nave

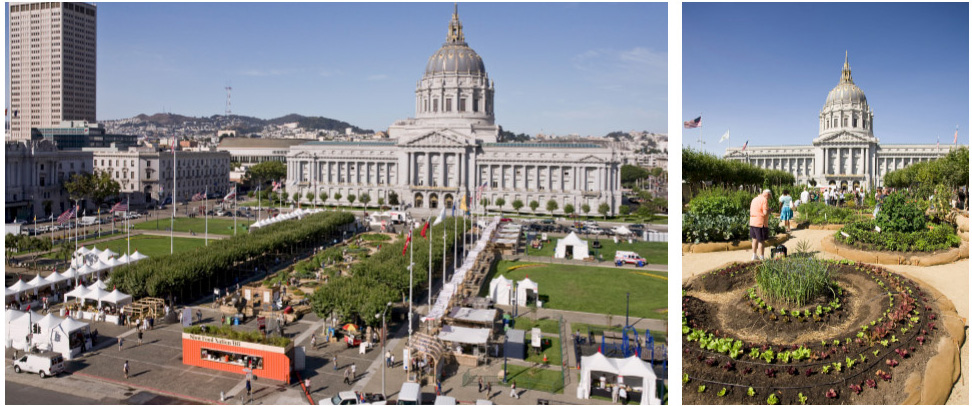
Slow Food Nation pavilions in San Francisco

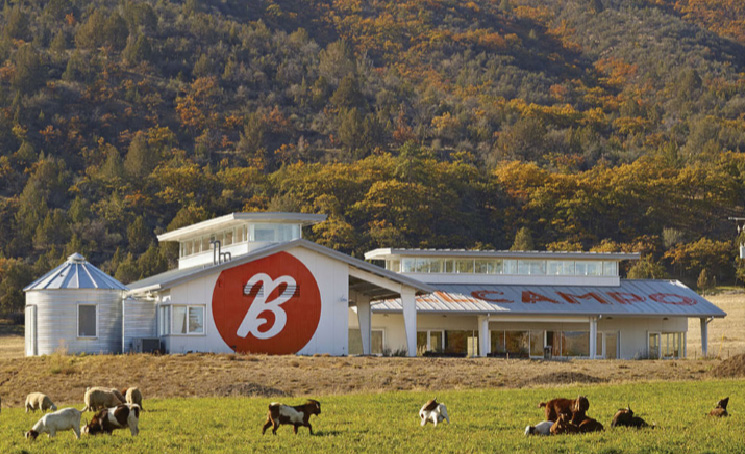
Belcampo farm offices and production kitchen (Shasta)

In addition to his work in the public realm, Baldauf has designed single-family residences throughout California, including the chalet-inspired Crow's Nest Residence at Sugar Bowl Resort. Located on a mountainside in the Sierra Nevada range, the property is influenced by traditional Tyrolean homes.

=== Service Roles: The Palace of Fine Arts Restoration and Slow Food Nation ===
In 2003, the Maybeck Foundation and the City of San Francisco created a public-private partnership to restore and preserve the Palace of Fine Arts. As Chairman of the Maybeck Foundation, Baldauf helped with the creation of a palace master plan, which would organize future preservation efforts. The same year, he helped to gather the San Francisco design community for the creation of several pavilions at Slow Food Nation.

== In progress ==
BCV is leading the design of the retail district at Hollywood Park in Inglewood, California. The overall project will encompass a mixed-use community including residential, retail, and office space on the 238-acre site of the former Hollywood Park Racetrack. At the center of the City of Inglewood, this development will build on the characteristics of the Los Angeles town centers that grew up throughout the basin in the 1920s and 1930s.

Baldauf has also led BCV's role in the Treasure Island Master Plan, which envisions a transit oriented community in the San Francisco Bay. The plan locates approximately 10,000 residents within a 10-minute walk of a new ferry terminal, and is to create approximately 200,000 sq. ft. of community and destination retail in a new Island Town Center which incorporates three historic exhibition buildings.

== Published work ==
- A Beaux-Arts Education: The Architectural Education of Arthur Brown, Jr. at the Ecole des Beaux-Arts, Paris, France, 1897-1903, Edited by Hans Baldauf, 2011, Published by the Bancroft Library, University of California, Berkeley
- Interiors & Sources Magazine, “New Ruralism Meets New Urbanism,” by Hans Baldauf, October 19, 2009
- Perspecta 26: Theater, Theatricality, and Architecture (The Yale Architecture Journal), 1990, Edited by Hans Baldauf, Co-Editors: Baker Goodwin and Amy Reichert

== Awards, honors and recognition ==
- 2015 AIA San Francisco Community Alliance Awards Social Impact Award The Center for Urban Education about Sustainable Agriculture (CUESA)
- 2013 AIA Los Angeles Restaurant Design Award Jury Winner Belcampo Meat Co., San Francisco, California
- 2009 AIA National Design Awards Honor Award for Regional and Urban Design Treasure Island Master Plan (with SOM, SMWM and CMG)
- 2008 AIA California Council Design Awards Urban Design Award Treasure Island Master Plan (with SOM, SMWM and CMG)
- 2006 AIA San Francisco Design Awards Merit Award, Urban Design Treasure Island Master Plan (with SOM, SMWM and CMG)
- 2004 AIA San Francisco Design Awards Honor Award The Ferry Building, San Francisco, California
- 2004 AIA California Council Design Awards Merit Award The Ferry Building, San Francisco, California
- 2003 National Trust for Historic Preservation Awards National Award The Ferry Building, San Francisco, California
- 2003 California Heritage Awards Council Award The Ferry Building, San Francisco, California
