= Pomplamoose (album) =

Studio album by Pomplamoose
- Released: March 11, 2009
- Recorded: Pomplamoose Home Studio
- Genre: Indie rock
- Length: 23:23
- Label: ShadowTree

Pomplamoose chronology
Pomplamoose (2009)	The Album You Bought at Our Show (2011)

Pomplamoose, originally released as Pomplamoose VideoSongs, is the self-titled debut album of American musical duo Pomplamoose.

== Release ==
The album was released in digital format only. Through exposure largely gained from accompanying YouTube videos, Pomplamoose sold approximately 100,000 songs in 2009. The videos have scored many millions of views – these early releases by Pomplamoose have been described by industry professionals as a "smash series" which brought them offers of collaboration with established artists like Ben Folds and Nick Hornby. Every track included on the album was uploaded to the band's YouTube page, released as final recording drafts showing details of how each song was produced.

== Track listing ==
1. "Expiration Date" – 3:02
2. "Little Things" – 2:21
3. "Beat the Horse" – 3:16
4. "Hail Mary" – 3:04
5. "Centrifuge" – 2:25
6. "Twice as Nice" – 2:53
7. "Pas Encore" – 3:03
8. "Be Still" – 2:49

== Reception ==
Reviews of the album have been generally positive. Chris Higgins of Mental Floss, described "falling in love" with the new sound and future of music.
