= Jack Conte =

American musician and entrepreneur (born 1984)

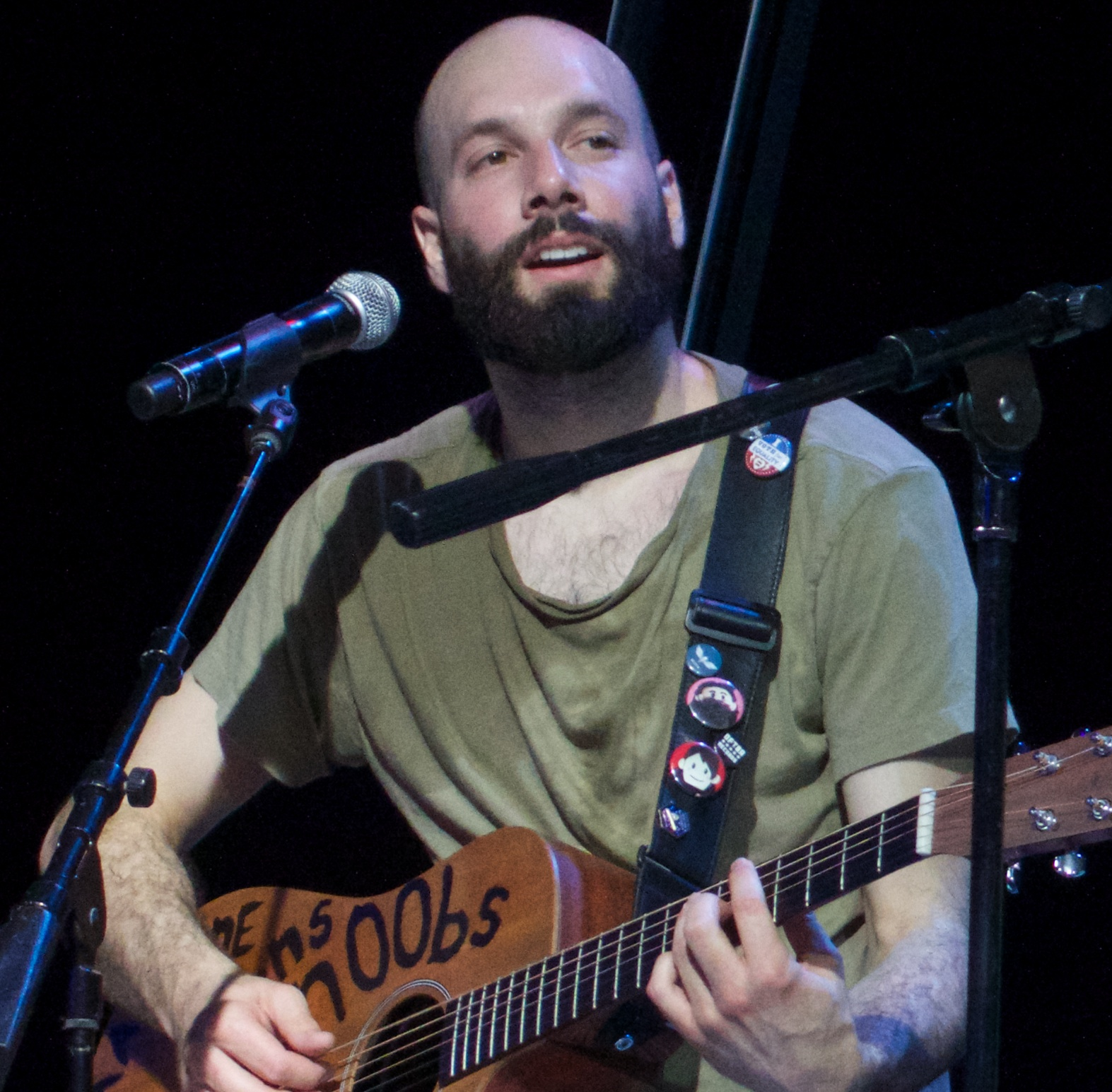
- Conte in 2014
- Born: July 12, 1984 (age 42); San Francisco, California, U.S.
- Education: Stanford University
- Occupations: Musician; entrepreneur
- Years active: 2002–present
- Spouse: Nataly Dawn (m. 2016)
- Musical career
- Genres: Jazz fusion; synth-pop; alternative rock; indie; R&B; power pop; funk
- Instruments: Vocals; guitar; piano; organ; keyboards; bass guitar; drums; percussion; accordion
- Member of: Pomplamoose; Scary Pockets; Magaziine

YouTube information
- Channel: Jack Conte
- Years active: 2007–2013
- Genre: Music
- Subscribers: 327 thousand
- Views: 45 million
- Last updated: December 15th, 2025
- Website: jackcontemusic.com

Jack Conte (/ˈkɒnti/; born July 12, 1984) is an American musician and businessman who is the co-founder and CEO of Patreon. He and his wife Nataly Dawn make up the musical duo Pomplamoose, and he is co-leader of the band Scary Pockets and founder of the band Magaziine.

== Career ==
Conte began his career as a video game voice actor, contributing the voice for all teen male sims in the 2004 bestseller The Sims 2.

In 2007, Conte created his YouTube channel to upload music videos inspired by the Dogme 95 movement. He gained widespread attention when his video Yeah Yeah Yeah was featured on YouTube's front page. Most of Conte's music videos follow a format called "VideoSongs", defined by two rules: no lip-syncing for instruments or voice ("what you see is what you hear") and no hidden sounds ("if you hear it, at some point you see it").

In 2008, Conte formed the band Pomplamoose with Nataly Dawn, who later became his wife. The band garnered significant fan support, primarily through their YouTube videos.

Much of Conte's work has been met with positive reviews, citing evocative lyrics in Sleep in Color and creative delivery of his VideoSongs. However, Conte's music was reviewed less favorably by Amplifier: "Hints of Conor Oberst, Radiohead, Patrick Watson, contemporary punk rock (screamo), radio power pop, and incalculable other singer songwriters are more than borrowed, making for a short mishmash of electro rock."

On May 7, 2013, Conte announced the launch of Patreon with co-founder Samuel Yam. Conte has compared his company to Kickstarter, but "for people who release stuff on a regular basis."

In 2022, Conte formed the synth-pop band Magaziine.

In 2023, Conte started the 'Digital Spaghetti' YouTube channel and Patreon page.

On June 3, 2026, as Patreon's CEO Conte responded to the Bricks & Minifigs–Reckless Ben controversy in a YouTube video. "

== Personal life ==
Conte was born in San Francisco and grew up in Marin County, California. He studied music and composition at Stanford University, graduating in 2006. Conte and Nataly Dawn engaged in January 2016 and married in May 2016.

== Discography ==
Jack Conte discography
- Studio albums: 3
- Extended plays: 4
- Compilation albums: 1
- Singles: 6
- Music videos: 3

=== Albums ===
==== Studio albums ====
Title	Details
VideoSongs Volume 2	Released: August 15, 2008; Label: ShadowTree Music; Format: Digital download
VideoSongs Volume 1	Released: August 29, 2008; Label: ShadowTree Music; Format: Digital download
VS4	Released: March 23, 2011; Label: ShadowTree Music; Format: CD, digital download

==== Compilation albums ====
Title	Details
My Big Package	Released: March 15, 2012; Label: ShadowTree Music; Format: Digital download

=== Extended plays ===
Title	Details
Nightmares and Daydreams	Released: May 21, 2007; Label: ShadowTree Music; Format: Digital download
VideoSongs Volume 3	Released: July 13, 2008; ShadowTree Music; Format: Digital download
Sleep in Color	Released: September 25, 2008; Label: ShadowTree Music; Format: CD, digital download
Conte	Released: May 2013; Label: ShadowTree Music; Format: Digital download

=== Singles ===
Title	Year	Album
"Judas (Jack Conte Version)"	2011	Non-album singles
"James Bond 007 Movie Theme"	2014	Non-album singles
"Daft Punk – Inception Mashup"	2014	Non-album singles
"Aphex Twin / Bright Eyes Mashup"	2014	Non-album singles
"Super Mario Bros. theme"	2014	Non-album singles
"Heroes" (with Beardyman)	2021	Non-album singles

=== Music videos ===
Year	Title	Album
2008	"Operation"	—N/a
2008	"Yeah Yeah Yeah"	—N/a
2013	"Pedals"	—N/a
