= Pomplamoose =

American pop music group

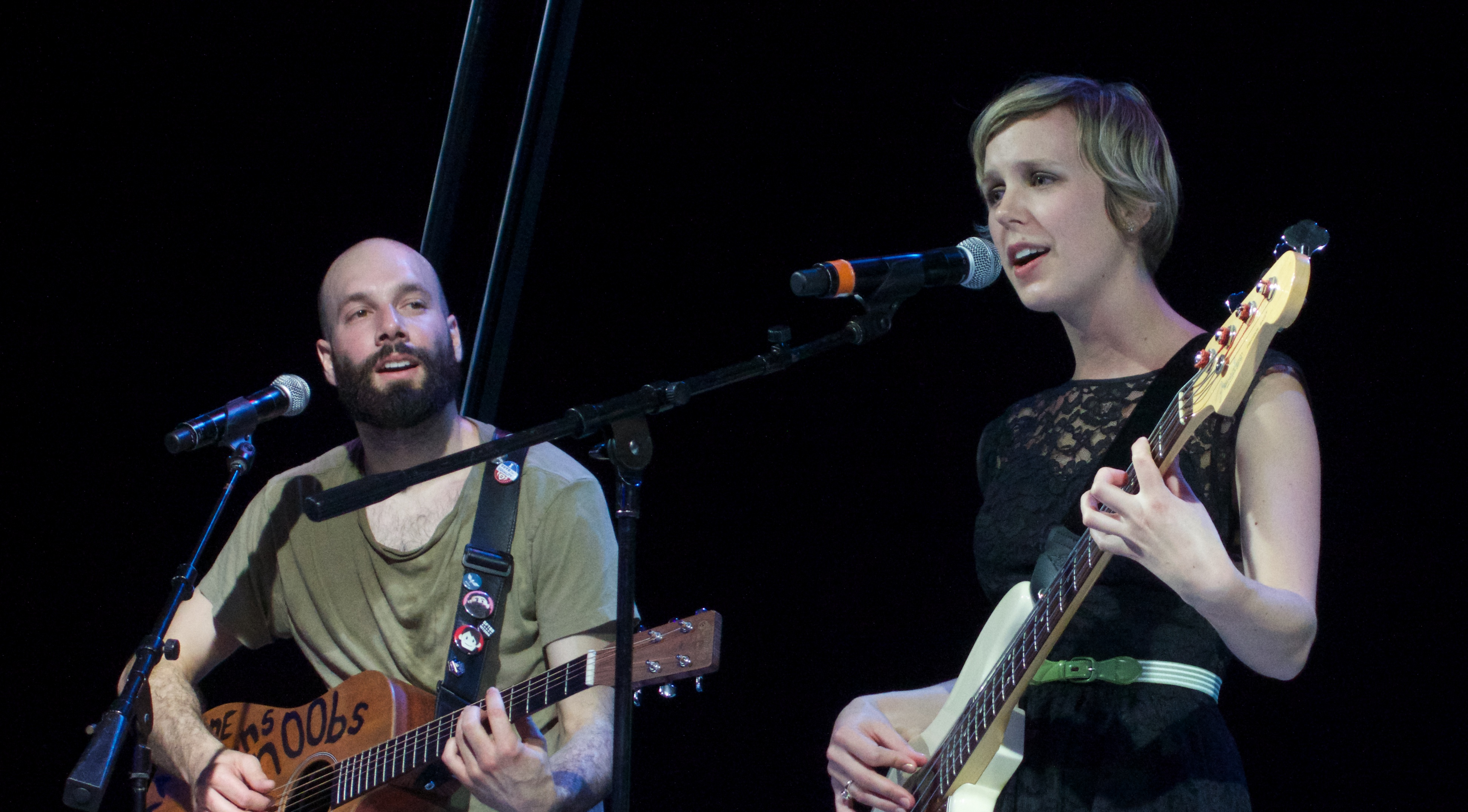
- Pomplamoose in 2014

Background information
- Origin: Corte Madera, California, U.S.
- Genres: Indie pop; funk; pop rock; jazz
- Works: Pomplamoose discography
- Years active: 2008–present
- Members: Nataly Dawn; Jack Conte
- Website: pomplamoose.com

YouTube information
- Channel: @Pomplamoose
- Years active: 2008-present
- Genre: Music
- Subscribers: 2.04 million
- Views: 707 million
- Last updated: April, 14, 2026

Pomplamoose (/ˈpɒmpləˌmuːs/) is an American musical husband-and-wife duo composed of multi-instrumentalist Jack Conte and singer-songwriter and bassist Nataly Dawn. Formed in 2008, the duo sold about 100,000 songs online in 2009.

They are known for their viral YouTube videos and covers of popular songs. As of March 2025, they had more than 2.01 million subscribers and over 640 million views on their YouTube channel. Their first song, "Hail Mary", was featured on YouTube's front page.

Their videos mostly take the form of "VideoSongs", a medium Conte defines with two rules:

1. What you see is what you hear. (No lip-syncing for instruments or voice)
2. If you hear it, at some point you see it. (No hidden sounds)

== Etymology ==
The name of the band derives from a misspelling of the French word pamplemousse (pronounced [pɑ̃pləmus]), meaning grapefruit.

== History ==
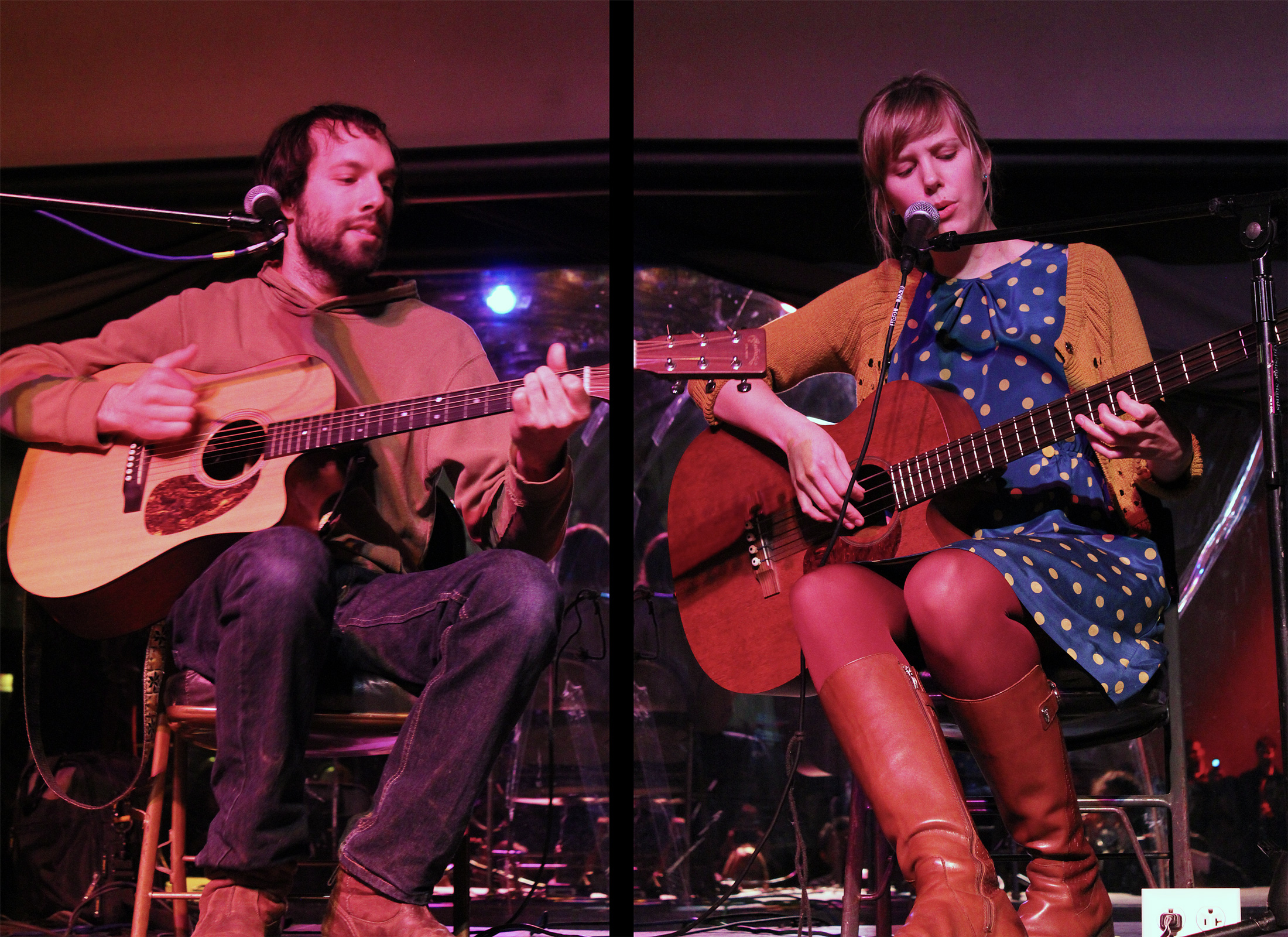
Pomplamoose performing in 2011

On April 11, 2010, the band was interviewed on NPR's All Things Considered. Conte discussed the "glitz-free" manner in which they record:

I guess I kinda don't like how there's such a pedestal for music culture and especially for band culture, it just feels fake; it feels like smoke and mirrors. I feel like music doesn't have to be like that. It can be something that's very normal and very accessible.

Also in April 2010, their cover of The Chordettes' "Mr. Sandman" was used in a commercial for Toyota's Avalon series, set in an Art Deco train station.

In September 2010, Pomplamoose recorded "Jungle Animal" with Allee Willis, who contacted the duo after hearing their cover of "September" by Earth, Wind & Fire and offered to write a new song for them. Willis also provided the art for the song's release as a single.

During the Christmas season of 2010, Pomplamoose performed in several ads in the style of their YouTube videos for Hyundai, singing their versions of Christmas classics such as "O Come, All Ye Faithful", "Jingle Bells", "Up on the Housetop", and "Deck the Halls".

In 2011, Pomplamoose began a webcast named Hey, It's Pomplamoose: A Show about Pomplamoose and Other Things. On November 5, 2013, Pomplamoose launched the second season of the webcast: a three-part sequel to the band's early years, including but not limited to, videos, a tour, and an album (released on July 29, 2014).

Conte and Dawn married in late 2016.

On May 18, 2021, Dawn announced her diagnosis with basal-cell carcinoma and that due to her condition, Pomplamoose would be releasing fewer videos per month.

== Charity work ==
In November 2010, Pomplamoose created a book drive for a charter school in Richmond, California, offering a free download of an album to anyone who purchased a book for the school district. The drive paid for over 11,000 books.

The duo did a rare live performance on November 8, 2013, performing at "Lens", Mateo Messina's 16th annual benefit concert at Seattle's Benaroya Hall for Seattle Children's Hospital.

== Awards and nominations ==
Year	Nominated work	Award	Category	Result
2020	Pomplamoose	Shorty Awards	YouTube Musician	Won

== Discography ==
Studio albums

- Pomplamoose (2009)
- Tribute to Famous People (2010)
- Hey It's Pomplamoose (2016)
- Winter Wishes (2018)
- Invisible People (2020)
- Impossible à Prononcer (2021)
- Photogénique (2025)
