= Andrés Montoya =

American poet

- Born: May 18, 1968
- Died: May 26, 1999 (aged 31)
- Education: California State University, Fresno, University of Oregon
- Relatives: JoAnna Kerby, Marcela Montoya, Malaquias Montoya III Malaquias Montoya, José Montoya, Richard Montoya, Maceo Montoya
- Writing career
- Notable works: The Iceworker Sings and Other Poems
- Notable awards: American Book Award

Andrés Montoya (May 18, 1968 – May 26, 1999) was a Chicano poet.

== Early life ==
Born on May 18, 1968, Montoya was the son of noted Chicano scholar, activist, and artist Malaquias Montoya and JoAnna Kerby. His father, Malaquias Montoya, teaches at University of California, Davis, and was the first visiting fellow at the Institute for Latino Studies (ILS) at the University of Notre Dame. Montoya was the nephew of José Montoya, a noted poet and one of the founders of the Royal Chicano Air Force. Other notable relatives include brother Maceo Montoya, an artist and writer, and cousin Richard Montoya, actor and cofounder of the performance troupe Culture Clash.

Montoya graduated from Fowler High School in 1986 and later received a BA degree from California State University, Fresno, and an MFA from the University of Oregon.

While a student, Montoya studied under Corrinne Clegg Hales, Garrett Hongo, T.R. Hummer., and Philip Levine. At California State University, Fresno, Montoya also worked to help found the Chicano Writers and Artists Association (CWAA) with colleague and friend Daniel Chacón. After receiving his MFA in 1994, Montoya worked as an instructor at a number of colleges and universities, including the University of Oregon, Fresno State, Fresno City College and Chabot College.

== Poetry ==
Montoya's poetry appeared in multiple journals and anthologies including The Santa Clara Review, In the Grove, Bilingual Review/Revista Bilingüe, and Flies, Cockroaches, and Poets.

In 1993, Montoya received the AWP Intro Award, an award from the Association of Writers & Writing Programs that celebrates the work of student writers.

In 1997, Montoya's first collection, the ice worker sings and other poems (Bilingual Press, 1999), was selected by Francisco X. Alarcón for the 1997 Chicano/Latino Literary Prize from the University of California, Irvine.

== Activism ==
Montoya's activism was the frequent focus of articles in The Fresno Bee and The Daily Collegian, a student run newspaper at California State University, Fresno. Many of the articles centered around Montoya's work as student-body president at California State University, Fresno. As student-body president, Montoya proved to be a leader for underrepresented groups.

Montoya's activism continued outside of his role as student-body president. While working as an instructor at Chabot College, Montoya organized a student walkout as a form of protest against California's Proposition 209.

In addition to poetry, Montoya published essays, such as “Multiculturalism, El Movimiento and What Is To Be Done,” that codified his political views.

== Death ==
Montoya died from leukemia at the age of 31 on May 26, 1999.

== Posthumous recognition ==
Montoya's first poetry collection, the ice worker sings and other poems (Bilingual Press, 1999), saw publication after Montoya’s death and would go on to win the Before Columbus Foundation American Book Award in 2000.

In honor of Montoya, the biennial Andrés Montoya Poetry Prize is awarded by the Institute for Latino Studies, at the University of Notre Dame. This Latino poetry competition, the first of its kind, was founded, and is coordinated by Francisco Aragón. It seeks to publish the first collection of a promising Latino-American poet who has not previously published a book of poetry. Established in the summer of 2003, the Andrés Montoya Poetry Prize has featured judges such as Francisco X. Alarcón, Rhina P. Espaillat, and Robert Vasquez. Past winners include Sheryl Luna, Gabriel Gómez, Paul Martínez Pompa, Emma Trelles, Laurie Ann Guerrero, David Campos, Felicia Zamora, and Heidi Andrea Restrepo Rhodes.

In 2008, In the Grove, a literary journal based in Fresno, published its final issue as a celebration of Montoya. The issue was edited by Daniel Chacón and featured poetry, art, and testimonies from friends, family, mentors, and fellow poets. The journal featured artwork from Montoya’s father, Malaquias, and the first publication of Montoya’s poem, “Pákatelas.”

In 2014, Maceo Montoya, published Letters to the Poet From His Brother. This hybrid memoir finds Maceo, the brother of Andrés Montoya, ruminating on the cultural legacy of his family.

In 2017, Montoya's posthumous collection, a jury of trees, was released from Bilingual Press and Letras Latinas at the University of Notre Dame as an entry in its Canto Cosas series. The Canto Cosas series, overseen by Francisco Aragón, publishes work that highlights aesthetic diversity. This collection was edited by Daniel Chacón, who also wrote a foreword for the collection detailing his friendship with Montoya. The collection, which features poems from throughout Montoya's life, also includes an introduction from Stephanie Fetta of Syracuse University.

In addition to the publication of a jury of trees, the 2017 Association of Writers & Writing Programs conference in Washington D.C. featured a panel entitled “The Iceworker Still Sings.” Panelists Francisco Aragón, Daniel Chacón, Corrinne Clegg Hales, David Campos, and Maceo Montoya spoke to the continued power and necessity of Montoya's writing and read poems found in a jury of trees.

In December 2017, Maceo Montoya announced a new website would be launched to celebrate and share the work of Andrés Montoya. This website now features biographical information, images, and literary works that speak to Montoya's legacy.

In April 2018, California State University, Fresno and Letras Latinas celebrated Montoya with a national symposium entitled “Together We’ll Be a Song: A Celebration of Andrés Montoya.” This symposium brought together Montoya's mentors, including U.S. Poet Laureate Emeritus Juan Felipe Herrera, Montoya's family, and the Andrés Montoya Poetry Prize winners. At the symposium, these prize winners shared poems commissioned by Francisco Aragón to celebrate the life and work of Montoya.

== Awards ==
- 1993 AWP Intro Award
- 1997 UC Irvine’s Chicano/Latino Literary Prize, for The Iceworker Sings and Other Poems, selected by Francisco X. Alarcón
- 2000 American Book Award, Before Columbus Foundation

== Works ==
=== Poetry ===
Books

- a jury of trees. Bilingual Press. January 2017. ISBN 978-1-939743-19-0
- The Iceworker Sings and Other Poems. Bilingual Review Press. September 1999. ISBN 978-0-927534-86-4.
- In brown America. University of Oregon. 1994.

=== Anthologies ===
- Christopher Buckley; David Oliveira; M. L. Williams; Mark Jarman, eds. (March 15, 2001). How Much Earth: An Anthology of Fresno Poets. Heyday Books. ISBN 978-0-9666691-7-6.
- Rick Heide, ed. (2002). "the rains have left and ernesto is dead". Under the fifth sun: Latino literature from California. Heyday Books. ISBN 978-1-890771-59-1.
- Stan Yogi; Gayle Mak; Patricia Wakida, eds. (2007). Highway 99: A Literary Journey Through California's Great Central Valley. Great Valley Books/Heyday Books. ISBN 978-1-59714-067-6.
