= Letras Latinas =

University of Notre Dame literary initiative

Letras Latinas is the literary initiative at the University of Notre Dame's Institute for Latino Studies (ILS), with an office on campus in South Bend, Indiana, as well as Washington, D.C. It was founded in 2004 and strives to enhance the visibility, appreciation and study of Latino literature both on and off the campus of the University of Notre Dame, with an emphasis on programs that support newer voices, foster a sense of community among writers, and place Latino writers in community spaces.

Letras Latinas is a founding member of the Poetry Coalition, an alliance of organizations working together to promote the values poets bring to culture and the important contribution poetry makes in the lives of people of all ages backgrounds.

The founding director of Letras Latinas is Francisco Aragón.

== Current programs ==
=== Letras Latinas/Red Hen Poetry Series ===
The Letras Latinas/Red Hen Poetry Series (formerly Prize) supports the publication of a second or third book by a Latino poet residing in the United States in partnership with Red Hen Press. The Series now operates as an "Editor's Choice" award, and is curated by Francisco Aragón, Letras Latinas' founding Director.

=== Pintura : palabra ===
"PINTURA : PALABRA" is a multi-year initiative that encourages new Latino writing inspired by art, above all the Smithsonian American Art Museum exhibit, Our America: The Latino Presence in American Art. Aspects of the initiative included ekphrastic writing workshops; inviting writers to engage with the exhibit; and partnering with literary journals to publish portfolios of ekphrastic writing. The exhibit debuted its national tour in 2013 and concluded in 2017. The six resulting portfolios are currently part of a book arts project to mark the conclusion of the initiative. They appeared in Poetry (magazine), Poet Lore, Notre Dame Review, The Los Angeles Review, The Packinghouse Review, and the Western Humanities Review. Among the poets who contributed are Juan Felipe Herrera, Lorna Dee Cervantes, and Tino Villanueva.

=== Akrilica ===
AKRILICA is a co-publishing venture with Noemi Press which seeks to showcase new innovative Latino writing. The series is named in honor of the groundbreaking, bilingual poetry book published in the eighties by distinguished Chicanx writer Juan Felipe Herrera. Books in this series include These Days of Candy by Manuel Paul Lopez, You Ask Me to Talk About the Interior by Carolina Ebeid, lo teaciario/the tertiary by Roque Salas Rivera, and Beast Meridian by Vanessa Angelica Villarreal, among others.

=== Letras Latinas oral history project ===
The project is a collaborative effort with the ILS librarian/archivist and produces video interviews of Latino writers visiting the Notre Dame campus with the aim of making them available as an online resource for students, scholars, and the community at large. Recorded writers include William Archila, Richard Blanco, Victor Hernandez Cruz, Martín Espada, Valerie Martinez, Naomi Ayala, Brenda Cárdenas, Salvador Plascencia, Barbara Jane Reyes, Maria Melendez, Daniel Alarcón, John Phillip Santos, and many others. The archive began in 2006 and numbers 50+ video interviews.

=== Spotlight on U.S. Hispanic Writers ===
Spotlight on U.S. Hispanic Writers is a collaboration between Letras Latinas and both the Hispanic Division and Poetry and Literature Center at the Library of Congress. It features emerging and established American poets and prose writers of Hispanic descent who write predominantly in English. In each audio segment the featured poet or writer participates in a moderated discussion with the curator of the series, Catalina Gomez, as well as reads from his or her work. Writers recorded in the Spotlight series include Richard Blanco, Eduardo C. Corral, Carmen Giménez Smith, Rigoberto González, and Valerie Martínez.

=== Letras Latinas Presents ===
A series of strategic partnerships helps the initiative produce literary programming, both on campus and elsewhere. For example, Latino/a Poetry Now operated in collaboration with the Poetry Society of America. Other partners include the Library of Congress, the Folger Shakespeare Library and the Poetry Foundation in Chicago, Illinois.

=== Letras Latinas Blog 2 ===
A relaunch of its prior iteration, Letras Latins Blog 2 publishes author spotlights, interviews, book round-ups, and in-depth poetry book reviews, among other articles related to contemporary Latinx writing. It was relaunched in 2022 upon receiving a grant from the Poetry Foundation. Its contributing editors include Francisco Aragón, Diego Báez, Brittany Torres Rivera, and Sofía M. Villamil DuránIts. Its managing editors are poets Brent Ameneyro and Laura Villareal.

== Concluded programs ==
The John K. Walsh Mentorship Essays, named after Notre Dame alum (‘61) and distinguished hispanista, John K. Walsh (1939 – 1990), is an online series hosted by ORIGINS literary journal that recognizes and highlights the indelible role mentors play in the lives of emerging Latino writers.

=== John K. Walsh Residency Fellowship (originally the Letras Latinas Residency Fellowship) ===
This program, which has concluded, funded a Latino writer's one-month residency at the Anderson Center in Red Wing, Minnesota. It was for writers working on a first full-length book. (2008 -2015)

=== Poetas y Pintores: Artists Conversing with Verse ===
A multidisciplinary initiative that paired twelve Latino and Latina artists with twelve Latino and Latina poets, Poetas y Pintores was a traveling exhibition that landed in New York, NY, Los Angeles, CA, San Diego, CA, Michigan City, IN, Albuquerque, NM, and Logan, UT in addition to Saint Mary's College in Indiana where the project was launched in January 2006. A joint effort with the Center for Women's InterCultural Leadership (CWIL) at Saint Mary's, the project was funded, in part, by the National Endowment for the Arts (NEA). (2006 – 2009)

=== The Wind Shifts: New Latino Poetry ON TOUR ===
With funding from the National Association of Latino Art and Culture (NALAC), the Missouri Arts Council, and National Endowment for the Arts (NEA), and the logistical partnership of Guild Complex, Letras Latinas carried out a seven-city two-year tour featuring the authors in The Wind Shifts: New Latino Poetry (University of Arizona Press, 2007). The destinations were: Palm Beach, FL, Minneapolis, MN, Seattle, WA, Berkeley, CA, Chicago, IL, Kansas City, MO, and New York, NY. The award-winning volume was edited by Francisco Aragón, who directs Letras Latinas. The Wind Shifts Tour (2008, 2009)

=== Palabra Pura ===
A partnership with the Guild Complex (2006 – 2012), a community-based literary organization in Chicago, Palabra Pura is a Letras Latinas outreach program whose aim is to present the work, in live performance, of Latino poets from around the United States. At one point, Palabra Pura inaugurated literary dialogues between the Latino poetry community and other communities of color at special editions of Palabra Pura. The series was co-founded by the Guild Complex and Letras Latinas in 2006 and, since 2012, is independently produced by the Guild Complex, with guest curators.

=== Latino/a Poetry Now ===
A partnership with the Poetry Society of America (PSA), Latino Poetry Now was a multi-year, multi-author tour that traveled to college campuses around the United States: Harvard University, Georgetown University, Macalester College, University of Arizona, and the University of Notre Dame. The PSA published on its website—in tandem with each reading—a multi-poet roundtable poetics discussion. (2011 – 2013)

=== "Chloe's Cabaret: Poetry, Music, Coffee, Conversation" ===
A partnership with the DeBartolo Performing Arts Center (DPAC) at Notre Dame and the Creative Writing Program, this initiative transformed the Philbin Studio Theatre into a café for the purpose of presenting poetry and music to the campus community and the community at large. Poets who appeared included: Victor Hernández Cruz, Tracie Morris, Barbara Jane Reyes, Tyehimba Jess, and Naomi Ayala. (2006 – 2008)

=== Letras Latinas Young Writers Initiative ===
The Young Writers Initiative offered annual support to a Latino or Latina youth who was an aspiring writer. The project was a collaboration between Letras Latinas and Cristo Rey Jesuit High School in Chicago and the Young Writers Workshop at Southern Illinois University, Carbondale. The initiative offered a five-day program designed to give high school students the chance to explore and develop their talents in poetry and prose writing.

=== Letras Latinas Writers Initiative ===
The Letras Latinas Writers Initiative aimed to create community among Latino poets and writers enrolled in graduate creative writing programs. Its principal program was a 3-day informal retreat for writers to spend time with one another. The first two retreats took place at the University of Notre Dame, and the second two took place at Arizona State University in partnership with the Virginia G. Piper Center for Creative Writing and their Desert Nights, Rising Stars Writers Conference. (2013 – 2016)

=== Latino Poetry Review ===
The only journal of its kind in the United States, Latino Poetry Review published book reviews, essays, and interviews with an eye towards spurring inquiry and dialogue. LPR recognized that Latino poets in the 21st century embrace, and work out of, a multitude of aesthetics. With this in mind, the critical focus is the poem and its poetics. LPR was launched in 2008 and published two numbers, one in 2008 and another in 2009.

=== Momotombo Press ===
Founded in 2000 in Davis, CA by Francisco Aragón, Momotombo Press launched with the multi-authored anthology, Mark My Words. It eventually honed its mission of publishing new chapbook-length works by Latino authors including Brenda Cárdenas, Steven Cordova, Lisa Gonzales, Kevin A. González, Scott Inguito, Aaron Michael Morales, Michelle Otero, Paul Martínez Pompa, and, Robert Vasquez. It concluded operations in 2009 with a chapbook by Octavio R. González.

=== Letras Latinas Blog ===
Letras Latinas Blog was an online site featuring e-interviews, book review round-ups, and other forms of literary commentary on contemporary Latino literature. Regular contributors have included Lauro Vazquez, Emma Trelles, Francisco Aragón and Oscar Bermeo. A newer iteration of the blog was launched in 2022.

=== Andrés Montoya Poetry Prize ===
The Andrés Montoya Poetry Prize, in collaboration with University of Notre Dame Press, supported the publication of a first book by a Latino poet in the United States. The Andrés Montoya Poetry Prize Initiative (AMPPI) is a campaign that helped underwrite the publication of A Jury of Trees—a posthumous book of poetry by Andrés Montoya co-published by Bilingual Press and Letras Latinas, as well as "Together We'll Be a Song: a celebration of Andrés Montoya, a symposium that took place in April 2018 in Fresno. Since 2023 the prize has been housed at the Huizache Literary Initiative at UC Davis and has published the selected book in collaboration with University of Nevada Press.

== See also ==
- List of Cuban-American writers
- List of Mexican-American writers
- List of Puerto Rican writers
