= Andrés Montoya Poetry Prize =

U.S. Latino Poetry Prize

The Andrés Montoya Poetry Prize Competition is a biennial program of Letras Latinas in collaboration with the University of Notre Dame Press. Founded in 2004, the Latino poetry competition seeks to publish the first collection of a promising Latino-American poet who has not previously published a book of poetry.

== Honoring Andrés Montoya ==
The award is named in honor of Andrés Montoya, a Chicano poet. Montoya died from leukemia in 1999 before the publication of his book, The Iceworker Sings and Other Poems. That collection would later go on to win the 1997 UC Irvine Chicano/Latino Literary Prize and the before Columbus 2000 American Book Award. Bilingual Press issued a second printing of the book in 2017. 2019 will mark the 20th anniversary since its publication.

== Founder and Coordinator ==
In his role as director of Letras Latinas, the literary initiative at the Institute for Latino Studies at the University of Notre Dame, Francisco Aragón founded the Prize in 2004 and serves as its coordinator.

== Past winners ==
Listing of past competitions
Year	Poet	Book	Judges
2020	Darrel Alejandro Holnes	Stepmotherland	John Murillo
2018	Heidi Andrea Restrepo Rhodes	The Inheritance of Haunting	Ada Limón
2016	Felicia Zamora	Of Form & Gather	Edwin Torres
2014	David Campos	Furious Dusk	Rhina P. Espaillat
2012	Laurie Ann Guerrero	A Tongue in the Mouth of the Dying	Francisco X. Alarcón
2010	Emma Trelles	Tropicalia	Silvia Curbelo
2008	Paul Martínez Pompa	My Kill Adore Him	Martín Espada
2006	Gabriel Gómez	The Outer Bands	Valerie Martínez
2004	Sheryl Luna	Pity the Drowned Horses	Robert Vasquez

== See also ==
- List of poetry awards
