= Laurie Ann Guerrero =

American poet

- Guerrero in 2014
- Born: San Antonio, Texas
- Education: Smith College (B.A.); Drew University (M.F.A.)
- Occupation: Poet
- Website: laurieannguerrero.com

Laurie Ann Guerrero is a Chicana poet from San Antonio, Texas. She was the poet laureate of San Antonio from 2014 to 2016 and the Poet Laureate of Texas from 2016 to 2017. In the fall semester of 2017, she became the first writer-in-residence at Texas A&M University San Antonio and a "fully immersed faculty member. She will teach a contemporary American woman poets course, host numerous University writing workshops and mentor students while working on her next writing project."

== Early life ==
Guerrero was born and raised in San Antonio, Texas. She received her B.A. from Smith College, where she was an Ada Comstock Scholar, and her M.F.A. from Drew University.

== Career ==
Guerrero is the author of two full collections of poetry. Her first collection, a chapbook of poetry, Babies Under the Skin (2008), won the Panhandler Publishing Award, chosen by Naomi Shihab Nye. In 2012, Guerrero's manuscript A Tongue in the Mouth of the Dying was chosen by Francisco X. Alarcón as the winner of the Letras Latinas Andrés Montoya Poetry Prize. It was published by University of Notre Dame Press in 2013. Her second book, A Crown for Gumecindo, a crown of sonnets was published by Aztlan Libre Press in 2015.

Guerrero has served on the faculty at University of the Incarnate Word, University of Texas-El Paso, Palo Alto College, and Gemini Ink, a community-centered literary arts organization in San Antonio. She served as the director of the Macondo Writers Workshop founded by Sandra Cisneros. Guerrero is a past CantoMundo fellow.

Poets & Writers Magazine named Guerrero one of 10 top debut poets in 2014. A Tongue in the Mouth of the Dying was listed as one of 14 must-read works of Chicano literature by Rigoberto Gonzalez and received an International Latino Book Award. Other honors include grants from the Artist Foundation of San Antonio and the Alfredo Cisneros del Moral Foundation. She is a CantoMundo alum and member of the Macondo Writers' Workshop.

In 2014 Guerrero was appointed by Mayor Julián Castro to serve as the second Poet Laureate of City of San Antonio, Texas. In 2016 she was appointed the 53rd Poet Laureate of the State of Texas.

Guerrero has been a featured reader and lecturer at various institutions including Yale University, New York University, University of Michigan-Ann Arbor, Smith College, Texas State University, University of Massachusetts-Dartmouth, University of California-Davis, Vanderbilt University, Fordham University, Northwestern University, Dodge Poetry Festival, Poetry at Round Top, among many others. She has held residencies at Alma de Mujer Center for Social Change in Austin, Texas, Baruch College in New York City, Palo Alto College in San Antonio, Letras Latinas in Washington, D.C., and most recently at the Guadalupe Cultural Arts Center in San Antonio. Guerrero's work has appeared in Poetry, Indiana Review, Luna Luna, Huizache, Texas Monthly, Bellevue Review, Borderlands: Texas Poetry Review, Women's Studies Quarterly, Texas Observer, Chicana/Latina Studies, Feminist Studies and others.

=== Books ===
- Babies Under the Skin, Panhanler Publishing, 2008. ISBN 9780980192902, OCLC 931891898
- A Tongue in the Mouth of the Dying, University of Notre Dame Press, 2013. ISBN 9780268010478, OCLC 930962844
- A Crown for Gumecindo, San Antonio, Texas: Aztlan Libre Press, 2015. ISBN 9780989778220, OCLC 909884789
