= Scouting for the Reaper =

American author Jacob M. Appel's first collection of short stories

- First edition
- Author: Jacob M. Appel
- Language: English
- Genre: Literary fiction
- Publisher: Black Lawrence Press
- Publication date: 2014
- Publication place: United
- Media type: Print
- Pages: 185 pp
- Award: Hudson Prize (2012)
- ISBN: 9781937854959 (paperback 1st ed.)
- Dewey Decimal: 813/.6
- LC Class: PS3601.P662 A6 2014

Scouting for the Reaper (2014) is the first collection of short stories by American author Jacob M. Appel. It won the Hudson Prize in 2012 and was published by Black Lawrence Press. Writing Today named it the best debut collection of 2014.

== Overview ==
Among the stories in the collection, "Rods and Cones", which had previously appeared in The Southwest Review, was listed "Notable Nonrequired Reading of 2007" in The Best American Nonrequired Reading, and "Creve Coeur", which previously won The Missouri Review's Editors Prize, was named as one of the "100 Other Distinguished Stories of 2007" by The Best American Short Stories. "Ad Valorem", first published in Subtropics, was named a "Distinguished Mystery Story" in The Best American Mystery Stories of 2009.

=== Table of contents ===
- "Choose Your Own Genetics"
- "Creve Coeur"
- "Scouting tor the Reaper"
- "Ad Valorem"
- "Rods and Cones"
- "The Extinction of Fairy Tales"
- "Hazardous Cargoes"
- "The Vermin Episode"

== Reception ==
Critic John Domini in The Brooklyn Rail noted of Appel's stories that "the rambunctious serendipity recalls T. C. Boyle, as does the ability to turn on a dime, now cutthroat, now huggable." Sue Ellis in Prick of the Spindle wrote of the collection that "every story is filled with all the pathos, humor, and intimacy readers will come to expect from this author". The book was on SPD's bestseller list from February to October 2014 and was the distributor's best-selling fiction book in March and April 2014
