= Gunpowder Press =

American poetry press

Gunpowder Press is an independent poetry press based in Santa Barbara, California. The press is co-edited by David Starkey and Chryss Yost. Both Starkey and Yost have served as Santa Barbara Poet Laureate. Gunpowder Press is a member of the Council of Literary Magazines and Presses.

In 2023, Gunpowder Press was recognized by the Santa Barbara Independent as a Local Hero.

Gunpowder Press books have been reviewed in The Adroit Journal, Mom Egg Review, Southern Humanities Review, and elsewhere. Authors published by the press include Barry Spacks, Jim Peterson, Laure-Anne Bosselaar, Catherine Abbey Hodges, Catherine Esposito Prescott, and others. Authors published by Gunpowder Press have been interviewed in journals including RHINO Poetry, Atticus Books & Music, Plume, The Christian Century Water-Stone Review.

== History ==
The press was founded in 2013 by David Starkey. Chryss Yost is the co-editor and book designer for the press. Starkey launched the press after unsuccessful efforts to find a publisher for a manuscript left by his late friend, poet David Allen Case. That manuscript became The Tarnation of Faust, the first book published by Gunpowder Press, in 2014. In 2024, Gunpowder Poetry, including Gunpowder Press, became a 501(c)(3) literary nonprofit.

The name of the press comes from the legend of Saint Barbara, who is associated with gunpowder.

== Publications ==
Since 2015, Gunpowder Press has published one book annually as the Barry Spacks Poetry Prize. The Spacks Prize is named in honor of Santa Barbara Poet Laureate Barry Spacks. Judges for the Spacks Prize have included Dan Gerber, Thomas Lux, Jane Hirshfield, Lee Herrick, Stephen Dunn, Jessica Jacobs, Danusha Laméris, and Gary Soto.

Gunpowder Press also publishes anthologies of poems by Central California poets as part of the Shoreline Voices Project imprint. Over 130 poets have appeared in Shoreline Voices print and online publications. The Press has partnered with the Santa Barbara Museum of Art, Santa Barbara Botanic Garden, the Santa Barbara Public Library, Lotusland, and Sansum Clinic.

In 2022, Gunpowder Press launched the California Poets Series. Poets published in the California Poets Series include Susan Kelley-DeWitt (Gatherer's Alphabet, 2022), Sandra McPherson (Speech Crush, 2022), Dennis Schmitz (Our Music, 2022), and Gary Soto (Downtime, 2023).

The Alta California Chapbook Series publishes two books a year in bilingual editions. Emma Trelles, also a Santa Barbara Poet Laureate, is series editor.
