= Heidi andrea restrepo rhodes =

American poet and educator

heidi andrea restrepo rhodes is an American poet, scholar, and educator. Rhodes' work is influenced by their identities as a queer, sick/disabled and non-binary person of Colombian descent. As of 2023, they were a visiting assistant professor of Gender and Women's Studies at Pomona College.

== Career ==
Rhodes has been published in the American Poetry Review, The Normal School, the Poetry Foundation, Waxwing, speculative nonfiction, As/Us, Pank, Raspa, Word Riot, Feminist Studies, Huizache, Nat.Brut, The Ascentos Review, Nepantla, and the Yellow Medicine Review, and displayed/performed at the National Queer Arts Festival, The Sick Collective, the Bureau of General Services-Queer Division, SomArts, and Galería de la Raza, along with other places. They have received poetry fellowships from Zoeglossia, CantoMundo, Radar Productions, VONA, and Yale Center for the Study of Race, Indigeneity, and Transnational Migration.

In an interview with Rosebud Ben-Oni, they explained that their book The Inheritance of Haunting deals with themes of hauntology through legacies of violence and colonialism, generational trauma, as well as community, resistance, and collective memory. The way hauntology is portrayed in their work was reportedly inspired by authors such as Homi K. Bhabha, Jacques Derrida, Avery Gordon, Saidiya Hartman, and Gayatri Spivak.

== Publications ==
- The Inheritance of Haunting, University of Notre Dame Press
- Ephemeral, EcoTheo Collective (2023)

== Awards and recognition ==
They were a quarter-finals judge for the 2017 Youth Speaks/Brave New Voices National Poetry Slam Competition.

=== List of awards ===
- 2018 Andrés Montoya Poetry Prize, selected by Ada Limón, for The Inheritance of Haunting
- 2020 Rona Jaffe Foundation Writers' Award finalist
- 2022 Lorca Latinx Poetry Prize, for Ephemeral
- 2023 Creative Capital Award

== Early and personal life ==
Rhodes was born in Arizona and raised in California. They have also lived in Brooklyn, New York, and Cambridge, Massachusetts. They are a second generation Colombian immigrant, and a bruja. As of January 2025, they live in the San Gabriel Mountains foothills of Southern California. They have a PhD in political theory from the CUNY Graduate Center.

They style their name intentionally with all lowercase letters, and use they/them pronouns. They are neurodivergent, identifying as neuroqueer.

They had done extensive research into militarized geography, such as in Colombia, Kashmir, El Salvador, and the US-Mexico border.
