= David Campos =

David Campos may refer to:

- David Campos (poet), American poet, writer, and producer of video poetry
- David Campos (politician) (born 1970), American politician who is Vice Chair of the California Democratic Party
- David Campos (cyclist) (born 2000), Spanish cross-country mountain biker

== See also ==
- Dave Campos (born 1942), a top-fuel drag motorcycle racer who held the motorcycle land speed record from 1990 until 2006.
