= Daniel Chacón =

Daniel Chacón may refer to:

- Daniel Chacón (writer), American writer
- Daniel Chacón (footballer), Costa Rican professional footballer
