= Notre Dame Review =

- Discipline: Literary magazine
- Language: English
- Edited by: William O'Rourke

Publication details
- History: Winter 1995 - present
- Publisher: University of Notre Dame (United States)
- Frequency: Quarterly

Standard abbreviations
- ISO 4: Notre Dame Rev.

Indexing
- ISSN: 1082-1864

Links
- Journal homepage

The Notre Dame Review is a national literary magazine. Founded by the University of Notre Dame, it publishes fiction, poetry and creative non-fiction quarterly. The first issue was published in Winter 1995.

== Awards ==
Each year The Notre Dame Review hosts the Sandeen Prize in Poetry and the Sullivan Prize in Short Fiction.

The Notre Dame Review is available in print and digital formats. Selections from the journal's first ten years of publication were published in Notre Dame Review: The First Ten Years (University of Notre Dame Press, 2009).

== Notable contributors ==
Seth Abramson, Jeffery Renard Allen, Robert Archambeau, Ciaran Berry, William Archila, Simeon Berry, Anne Blonstein, Corinne Demas, Regina Derieva, John Drexel, Debra Di Blasi, Eckhard Gerdes, Laura Gray-Street, Seamus Heaney, Harriet McBryde Johnson, Kelly Le Fave, Stacey Levine, Moira Linehan, Sheryl Luna, Valerie Martínez, Nadine Meyer, Czeslaw Milosz, Lisa Norris, Ricardo Pau-Llosa, Barbara Jane Reyes, Radoslav Rochallyi, Vera Schwarcz, Keith Taylor, Robert Vasquez, Martha Zweig

== See also ==
- List of literary magazines
