= Sheryl Luna =

American writer

Sheryl Luna is an American writer.

Born and raised in El Paso, Texas, Luna's most recent collection, Magnificent Errors, received the Ernest Sandeen Prize at Notre Dame. The judges were Orlando Menes and Joyelle McSweeney. Luna is the author of Pity the Drowned Horses (University of Notre Dame Press, 2005), which was selected by Robert Vasquez as the inaugural winner of the Andrés Montoya Poetry Prize. It was a finalist for the Colorado Book Award. Her collection, Seven, was published by 3: A Taos Press in 2013. It was a finalist for the Colorado Book Award.

Luna's poetry has appeared in Poetry, Georgia Review, Prairie Schooner, Poetry Northwest, Puerto del Sol, Kalliope, and the Notre Dame Review.

Luna earned a BA at Texas Tech University, an MFA from the University of Texas at El Paso, an MA in English from Texas Woman's University, and a PhD in Contemporary Literature from the University of North Texas.

== Works ==
=== Poetry ===
"Magnificent Errors" (University of Notre Dame Press, 2022)

- Pity the Drowned Horses (University of Notre Dame Press, 2005)
- Seven (3: A Taos Press, 2013)
