= Gabriel Gomez (poet) =

American poet

Gabriel "Gabe" Gómez is a poet, journalist, and marketing executive.

Born in El Paso, Texas, Gabe Gómez is the author of The Outer Bands (University of Notre Dame Press, 2007), which was selected by Valerie Martinez as the 2007 winner of the Andrés Montoya Poetry Prize. The title poem is a found poem on the experiences of living through Hurricane Katrina and Hurricane Rita. His second collection of poetry, The Seed Bank, was published by Mouthfeel Press. Gómez earned a bachelor's of arts degree at the College of Santa Fe (now Santa Fe University of Art and Design) and a master's of fine arts degree at Saint Mary's College of California. He has taught at Tulane University, the University of New Orleans, and the Institute of American Indian Arts.

Gómez is currently pursuing an Executive MBA at the University of New Mexico, Anderson School of Management. He works as the Managing Director of Marketing and Communications at the University of New Mexico Foundation. He is also editor-at-large for Table Magazine New Mexico, where he writes about food, wine, and the cultural heritage of New Mexico. Gómez also serves as the President of the New Mexico chapter of the American Marketing Association.

== Works ==
=== Poetry ===
- Samsara at Quantum Zeno (Mouthfeel Press, 2024)
- The Seed Bank (Mouthfeel Press, 2011)
- The Outer Bands (University of Notre Dame Press, 2007)
