= Hudson Prize =

The Hudson Prize is an American literary award for a collection of poetry or fiction. The award is administered by Black Lawrence Press. It was previously awarded, under a different endowment, as the Ontario Prize. Poets & Writers magazine has consistently listed it as a "top ten" literary prize in its annual rankings. It is the largest and longest-running single category/multiple genre book prize in the United States.

In 2013, three of the 25 recipients of National Endowment for the Arts grants were past winners of the Hudson Prize.

== Recent winners ==
Year	Author	Title	Ref.
2006	Jo Neace Krause	The Last Game We Played	
2007	Daniel Chacón	Unending Rooms	
2008	Abayomi Animashaun	The Giving of Pears	
2009	Patrick Michael Finn	From the Darkness Right Under Our Feet	
2010	Sarah Suzor	The Principle Agent	
2011	B. C. Edwards	The Aversive Clause	
2012	Jacob M. Appel	Scouting for the Reaper	
2013	Betinna Judd	Patient	
2014	Matthew Cheney	Blood Stories	
2021	Raena Shirali	summonings	
