= Rigoberto González =

American writer and book critic (born 1970)

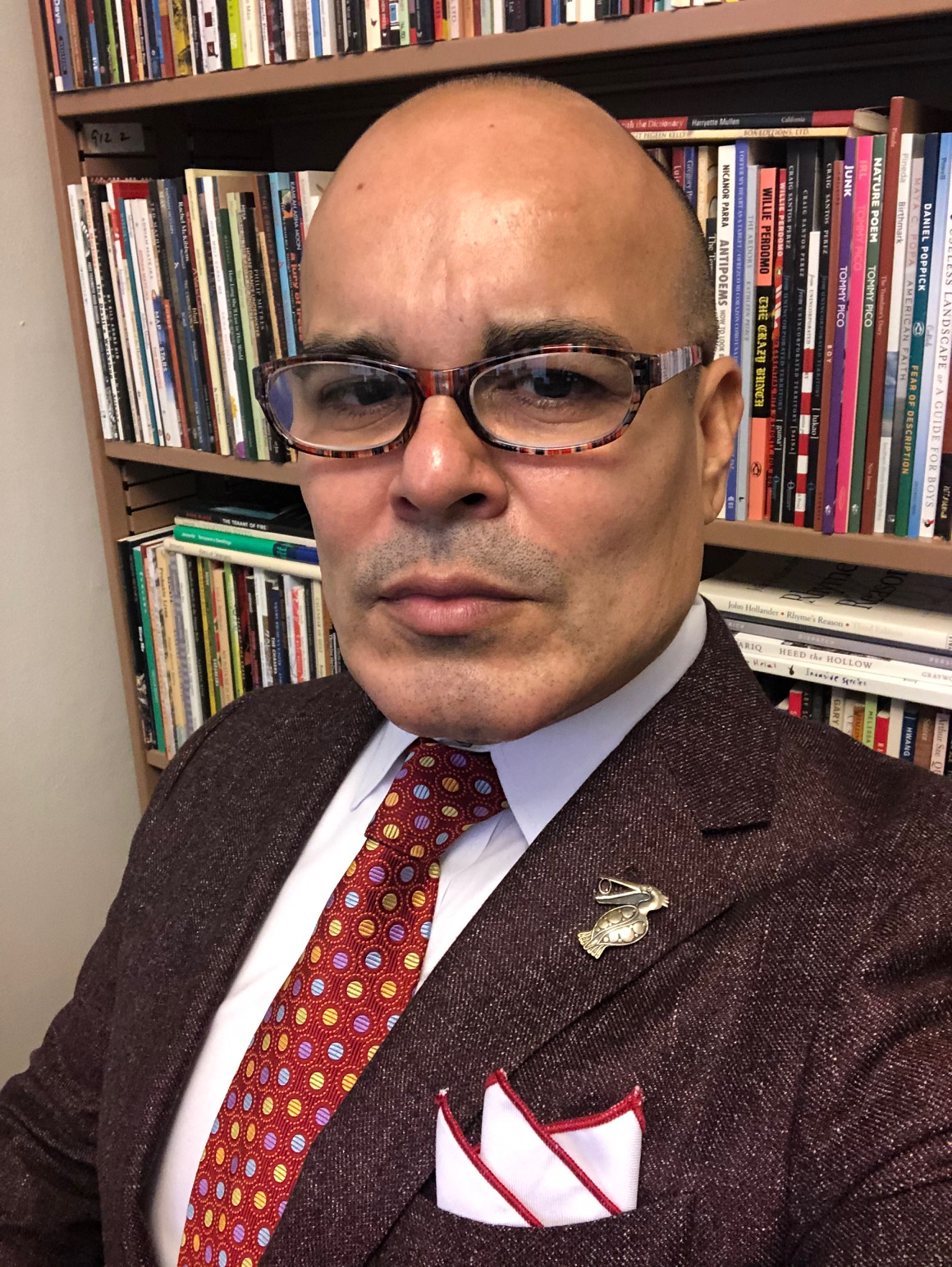
- Born: July 18, 1970 (age 56); Bakersfield, California, U.S.
- Occupations: Professor; writer; critic
- Writing career
- Notable works: Latino Poetry: A Library of America Anthology; To the Boy Who Was Night; What Drowns the Flowers in Your Mouth; Antonio's Card; Butterfly Boy: Memories of a Chicano Mariposa; The Mariposa Club; Unpeopled Eden
- Notable awards: PEN/Voelcker Award for Poetry, Lannan Literary Fellowship, The Bill Whitehead Award for Lifetime Achievement (The Publishing Triangle); Guggenheim Fellowship; American Book Award
- Website: rigobertogonzalez.com

Rigoberto González (born July 18, 1970) is an American writer and book critic. He is an editor and author of poetry, fiction, nonfiction, and bilingual children's books, and self-identifies in his writing as a gay Chicano. His most recent project is Latino Poetry, a Library of America anthology, which gathers verse that spans from the 17th century to the present day. His memoir What Drowns the Flowers in Your Mouth: A Memoir of Brotherhood was a finalist for the National Book Critics Circle Award in Autobiography. He is the 2015 recipient of the Bill Whitehead Award for Lifetime Achievement from the Publishing Triangle, the 2020 recipient of the PEN/Voelcker Award for Poetry, and the 2024 recipient of a Lifetime Achievement Award from the Los Angeles Review of Books.

== Early life and education ==
Born in Bakersfield, California, on July 18, 1970, and raised in Michoacán, Mexico, he is the son and grandson of migrant farm workers. His extended family migrated back to California in 1980 and returned to Mexico in 1992. González remained alone in the U.S. to complete his education. Details of his troubled childhood in Michoacán and his difficult adolescence as an immigrant in California are the basis for his coming of age memoir Butterfly Boy: Memories of a Chicano Mariposa.

During his college years he performed with various Baile Folklorico and Flamenco dance troupes. He earned a B.A. degree in Humanities and Social Sciences Interdisciplinary Studies from the University of California, Riverside, and graduate degrees from the University of California, Davis, and Arizona State University in Tempe.

== Professional background ==
In 1997 González enrolled in a PhD program at the University of New Mexico in Albuquerque, but dropped out a year later to join his partner in New York City and to pursue a writing career. The two published their first books a few months apart in the spring of 1999. In 2001, González pursued a career as an academic, holding teaching appointments at The New School, the University of Toledo, the University of Illinois at Urbana-Champaign, and Queens College/City University of New York.

González has lived and worked mostly in New York City and teaches at the writing program of Rutgers University in Newark, where he is distinguished professor of English and director of the MFA Program in Creative Writing. The recipient of a Lannan Literary Award, United States Artist Rolón Fellowship, the Shelley Memorial Award of the Poetry Society of America, a New York Foundation for the Arts Fellowship, a Lambda Literary Award, the Barnes & Noble Writers for Writers Award he wrote a monthly Chicano/Latino book review column, from 2002 to 2012, for the El Paso Times. On July 22, 2012, González reached a milestone when he published his 200th review with the Texas newspaper.

In 2008 he was named to the position of 2009 Poet-in-Residence by the Board of Trustees of The Frost Place, the farm house of Robert Frost located in New Hampshire. He was also named one of 100 Men and Women Who Made 2008 a Year to Remember by Out magazine. In 2009, My Latino Voice named him one of the 25 most influential GLBT Latinos in the country.

González has championed a number of efforts to give visibility to marginalized voices. He curated and hosted The Quetzal Quill, a reading series at the Cornelia Street Café in Manhattan, and featured a number of poets on The Poetry Foundation blog Harriet, and on the National Book Critics Circle blog Critical Mass through the Small Press Spotlight Series. He wrote 109 entries for Harriet and "spotlighted" 66 authors on Critical Mass.

On March 30, 2016, González was named, along with 9 other writers, critic-at-large at the L.A. Times. He also served single terms on the Board of Trustees of the Association of Writers and Writing Programs (AWP). and on the Board of Governors of the Poetry Society of America (PSA). As of 2018, he is a member of The Center for Fiction Writers Council and serves on the board of Zoeglossia: A Community for Poets with Disabilities.

On December 6, 2016, González was celebrated for his work and literary activism at Poets House.

As of 2018, González sits on the Editorial Advisory Board of the Machete Series (Ohio State University Press), which "showcases fresh stories, innovative forms, and books that break new aesthetic ground in nonfiction—memoir, personal and lyric essay, literary journalism, cultural meditations, short shorts, hybrid essays, graphic pieces, and more—from authors whose writing has historically been marginalized, ignored, and passed over".

As of 2019, he is faculty of the Randolph College Low-Res MFA in creative writing.

As of 2020, González serves as editor of the University of Arizona Press Camino del Sol Latinx Literary Series.

As of 2021, González serves on the editorial board of the Immigrant Writing Series at Black Lawrence Press, alongside Abayomi Animashaun, Sun Yung Shin, and Ewa Chrusciel.

In 2024, González received the 9th Annual Lifetime Achievement Award (alongside Dave Eggers and Quincy Troupe) from the Los Angeles Review of Books and his alma mater, the University of California-Riverside.

== Published works ==
Full-length poetry collections

- To the Boy Who Was Night (Four Way Books, 2023), ISBN 9781954245525
- The Book of Ruin (Four Way Books, 2019), ISBN 9781945588327, OCLC 1041561471
- Unpeopled Eden (Four Way Books, 2013), ISBN 9781935536369, OCLC 828834171
- Black Blossoms (Four Way Books, 2011), ISBN 9781935536154, OCLC 701242445
- Other Fugitives and Other Strangers (Tupelo Press, 2006), OCLC 329269270
- So Often the Pitcher Goes to Water until It Breaks (University of Illinois Press, 1999), ISBN 9780252067983, OCLC 246271983

Poetry chapbook

- Our Lady of the Crossword (A Midsummer Night's Press, 2015)

Bilingual children's books

- Antonio’s Card/ La Tarjeta de Antonio (Children's Book Press, 2005)
- Soledad Sigh-Sighs/ Soledad Suspiros (Children's Book Press, 2003).

Early reader books in Spanish for Benchmark Education Company

- Allá en el rancho grande
- Bronceado por la nieve
- La chinampa de Xóchitl
- ¿Cómo se llama el conejito?
- Frida y La Adelita
- La hormiguita Sarita
- La laguna de los lirios de agua
- La magia de La Guajira
- Los músicos de Morelia
- La piñata de tecolote
- La parcela
- Octavio Larrazano: campeón del pueblo
- Operación Deditos Envueltos
- Perdidos en El Yunque
- Roque
- Sebastián, joven historiano
- Tere y el taller de los alebrijes
- Tiembla la tierra

Novels

- Mariposa U. (Tincture Books, 2015)
- Mariposa Gown (Tincture Books, 2012)
- The Mariposa Club (Alyson Books, 2009; Tincture Books, 2010), ISBN 9781590213506, OCLC 693750914
- Crossing Vines (University of Oklahoma Press, 2003), ISBN 9780806135281. OCLC 50809294

Memoirs and other nonfiction

- Abuela in Shadow, Abuela in Light (University of Wisconsin Press, 2022), ISBN 9780299337605
- What Drowns the Flowers in Your Mouth: A Memoir of Brotherhood (University of Wisconsin Press, 2018), ISBN 9780299316907, OCLC 1003641909
- Pivotal Voices, Era of Transition: Toward a 21st Century Poetics (University of Michigan Press, 2017)
- Autobiography of My Hungers (University of Wisconsin Press, 2013), ISBN 9780299292508, OCLC 808990373
- Red-Inked Retablos: Essays (University of Arizona Press, 2013), ISBN 9780816521357, OCLC 807768205
- Butterfly Boy: Memories of a Chicano Mariposa (University of Wisconsin Press, 2006), ISBN 9780299219048, OCLC 740626000

Short story collections

- Men without Bliss (University of Oklahoma Press, 2008), ISBN 9780806139456, OCLC 254493386

Works edited

- Latino Poetry (Library of America, 2024)
- Ploughshares (Spring 2019, Volume 45, No. 1)
- Xicano Duende: A Select Anthology (Bilingual Press, 2011)
- Camino del Sol: Fifteen Years of Latina and Latino Writing (University of Arizona Press, 2010)

== See also ==
- List of Mexican American writers
- Latino poetry
- Latino literature

== Sources ==
- Library of Congress Online Catalog > Rigoberto González
