= John Drexel =

American poet, critic, and editor

- Born: Stamford, Connecticut, U.S.
- Education: University of Connecticut; University of Leeds
- Occupations: Poet, critic and editor
- Writing career
- Genre: Poetry

John Drexel is an American poet, critic, and editor.

== Life and work ==
John Drexel was born in Stamford, Connecticut. He is a graduate of the University of Connecticut and holds an M.A. in English from the University of Leeds, England, where his thesis advisor was Geoffrey Hill. He subsequently worked as an editor at Oxford University Press and other publishing houses in New York City, and served as general editor of The Facts On File Encyclopedia of the 20th Century.

Mr. Drexel's poems have appeared in numerous magazines, including First Things, Hudson Review, Image, Oxford Poetry, The New Criterion, New Ohio Review, Notre Dame Review, The Paris Review, Salmagundi (magazine), Southern Review, St. Petersburg Review, Valparaiso Poetry Review, and Verse.

He has written on modern British and Irish poetry for the online Contemporary Poetry Review, and has reviewed for Arts & Letters, Irish Literary Supplement, Partisan Review, and other journals. He also directed poetry workshops at Hay-on-Wye, Wales, and has twice served as a poetry judge for the Constance Saltonstall Foundation for the Arts.

=== Awards ===
- Amy Lowell Poetry Travelling Scholarship
- Hawthornden Castle Fellowship

=== Anthologies ===
- A Fine Excess: Contemporary Literature at Play. Sarabande Books. 2001. ISBN 978-1-889330-51-8.
- For New Orleans and Other Poems. Bayeux Arts. 2007. ISBN 978-1-896209-75-3.

=== Criticism ===
- “Threaders of Double-Stranded Words: News from the North of Ireland,” New England Review and Bread Loaf Quarterly, Vol. XII, No. 2, Winter, 1989, pp. 179–92.
- “Searching the Darkness for a Landing Place: The Achievement of Thomas Kinsella,” Literary Review, Vol. XXXIII, No. 3, Spring, 1990, pp. 337–44.
