= Lisa Norris =

American author and professor

Lisa Norris is an American author and professor. She is the prize-winning author of Toy Guns and Women Who Sleep With Animals. She is a professor of English and Creative Writing at Central Washington University in Ellensburg, Washington.

== Biography ==
She has a bachelor's degree in forestry from Virginia Tech, an M.A. in English from Idaho State University, and an MFA in creative writing from American University in Washington, D.C..

Her book Toy Guns is a collection of short stories written from multiple perspectives. Norris explores violence in the contemporary American culture using a variety of first- and third-person narrative styles, and through an assortment of colorful characters—most of whom are female. The book's focus is on the various ways violent experiences can be articulated: violent threats, acts, memories, suggestions, relationships, games, and other situations dominate the tales spun in Toy Guns. Toy Guns was published by Helicon Nine Editions in 1999 and won the Willa Cather prize for fiction.

Her story collection, Women Who Sleep With Animals, won the Stephen F. Austin University Press Prize for fiction and was published in Fall 2011. It was also a finalist for the Spokane Prize. The stories offer glimpses of ordinary women and animals in their moments of extremity. In settings that range from suburbs to wildlife reserves, from the eastern to the western U.S., Norris's characters negotiate sex, marriage, infidelity, racism, cancer, war, aging and loss with the companionship of each other and the critters—both pets and the wild ones. Biologists, retail salespeople, artists, professors, wives, mothers, and lovers encounter problems that no one looks for (a bear charges the biologists who study her; a recently divorced woman finds herself in the company of her husband's lover at a sex toy party). Moments of revelation feature luck and compassion. In the final story, a woman dealing with a shocking sexual offer finds comfort, as do many of the characters, in her mammalian elements.

Her stories, poems and creative nonfiction have been published in Fourth Genre, Ascent, South Dakota Review, Smartish Pace, JuxtaProse Literary Magazine, Notre Dame Review, the anthology Kiss Tomorrow Hello (Doubleday 2006) and others.
