= David Campos (poet) =

American poet

David Campos is an American poet, writer, and producer of video poetry from California. His debut collection, Furious Dusk, won the 2014 Andrés Montoya Poetry Prize from Letras Latinas, the literary initiative at the University of Notre Dame's Institute for Latino Studies (ILS).

Campos is a CantoMundo fellow. His poems have appeared in American Poetry Review, Boxcar Poetry Review, Huizache, Atticus Review, and Verdad, among others.

== Career ==
Campos attended Fresno City College, and California State University, Fresno where he earned a BA in English Education and the University of California, Riverside for an MFA in Creative Writing and Writing for the Performing Arts.

He lives in Fresno, where he teaches English at Fresno City College and College of the Sequoias.

== Publications ==
Furious Dusk, University of Notre Dame Press, 2015. ISBN 978-0268023775.
