= Elías Nandino =

Mexican poet

- Born: 19 April 1900; Cocula, Jalisco
- Died: 3 October 1993 (aged 93); Guadalajara, Jalisco
- Education: Universidad Nacional Autónoma de México
- Occupations: Poet and surgeon

Elías Nandino (April 19, 1900 – October 3, 1993) was a Mexican poet.

== Biography ==
Nandino was born in Cocula, Jalisco. As a boy, he was brought up in the Catholic religion and served as an altar boy. He also attended Catholic school. Nandino's first homosexual encounters were apparently initiated by Catholic priests he knew. Nandino was friends with boys who were able to express their homosexual desires secretly and discreetly at the schools.

Nandino studied medicine in Cocula and Guadalajara and finally at the Universidad Nacional Autónoma de México (UNAM) in Mexico City where he "graduated as a surgeon in 1930." From 1928 to 1934, he lived in Los Angeles, where he completed his medical internship.

Nandino was influenced to start writing poetry when he was seventeen, by Manuel M. Flores and writer, Manuel Acuña. His was first published at age nineteen in Bohemia, in Guadalajara. At UNAM, he created the journal, Allis Vivere, where students could publish their own poems and short writing. Allis Vivere led to Nandino meeting Los Contemporáneos ("The Contemporaries" in Spanish), a Mexican modernist group of poets. He was influenced early on by Xavier Villaurrutia and José Gorostiza.

Nandino worked as a surgeon at different hospitals during most of his life, during which he also wrote poetry. He was also open about his homosexuality, but this did not affect his career as a surgeon. His early poetry was rather sombre, focusing on topics like death, nighttime and dreams. From the 1950s his poetry became more personal, whereas his later poems combined eroticism and metaphysics.

In 1982, he met and had a strong influence on the Chicano poet, Francisco X. Alarcón who was impressed with Nandino's bravery in living his life as an openly gay man in Mexico City. Nandino wished to support younger gay writers. He became Alarcon's "role model and soul mate."

He was editor of several publications and promoter of writing workshops. In the last years of his life he received numerous awards both for his career as a poet and for his support to literature in Mexico, such as the Aguascalientes National Poetry Prize (1979) and the National Prize for Literature (1982). He died in Guadalajara, Jalisco at the age of 93.

== Poetry ==
Nandino's poetry uses both "romanticism and symbolism" and he is very much a provocative dissident who wanted to "erode the mystique around sexuality." His poetry often deals with contradictions in both how he felt about religion, homosexuality and eroticism. His collection, Erotismo al rojo blanco/Eroticism at a Burning White, was given Mexico's highest literary prize in 1983.

He often uses the sonnet form.

== Publications ==
- Espiral, 1928
- Décimas a mi muerte, 1930
- Color de ausencia, 1932
- Eco, 1934
- Río de sombra, 1935
- Sonetos, 1937
- Poemas árboles, 1938
- Nuevos sonetos, 1939
- Nudo de sombras, 1947
- Espejo de mi muerte, 1945
- Poesía I, 1947
- Poesía II, 1949
- Naufragio de la duda, 1950
- Triángulo de silencios, 1953
- Nocturna suma, 1955
- Nocturno amor, 1958
- Nocturno día, 1959
- Nocturna palabra, 1960
- Eternidad del polvo, 1970
- Cerca de lo lejos, 1979
- Costumbre de morir a diario, 1982
- Erotismo al rojo blanco, 1983
- Todos mis nocturnos, 1988
- Ciclos terrenales, 1989.
- El coronelito, 1991 (stories).
- Banquete íntimo, 1993 (edited posthumously).
- Juntando mis pasos, 2000 (autobiography).
- Selected Poems, in Spanish and English, 2010, (translated and with an introduction by Don Cellini).
