= Keith Taylor (poet) =

Canadian poet, translator and professor (born 1952)

Keith Taylor (born 1952) is a Canadian poet, translator and professor.

== Life and work ==
"In the Presence of Large Predators"

We're sure now: wolves have found their way back
here, to the lower peninsula,

first reported by a park ranger
looking north across the Straits, through snow,
uncertainly watching a gray pair
skitter across the ice, their tracks lost

in the storm, then only a few prints
for years, some scat found twenty miles south,

before a night vision camera
catches a movement, and the lanky legs
massive chest and triangular head,
those green eyes glowing once again

—

Born in British Columbia, Taylor spent his childhood in Alberta and Indiana. After earning an M.A. in English from Central Michigan University, he worked a variety of odd jobs: the co-host of a radio talk show, a house painter, a freight handler, a teacher, a freelance writer. He also worked at Shaman Drum, a leading independent bookstore, for twenty years. He currently lives in Ann Arbor with his wife and daughter and is a professor in the creative writing program at University of Michigan.

His poems have appeared in many journals, including The Ann Arbor Observer, The Chicago Tribune, The Detroit Free Press, The Los Angeles Times, Michigan Quarterly Review, The Notre Dame Review, ' Poetry Ireland Review, and The Sunday Telegraph Magazine (London). Taylor is the recipient of, among other awards, a fellowship in poetry from the National Endowment for the Arts.

== Books ==
=== Collections ===
- Learning to Dance (Falling Water Books, 1985)
- Weather Report (Ridgeway Press, 1988)
- Dream of the Black Wolf: Notes from Isle Royale (Ridgeway Press, 1993)
- Detail from the Garden of Delights (Limited Mailing Press, 1993)
- Everything I Need (March Street Press, 1996)
- Life Science and Other Stories (Hanging Loose Press, 1995)
- Guilty at the Rapture (Hanging Loose Press, 2006)
- If the World Becomes so Bright (Wayne State University Press, 2009)
- Marginalia for a Natural History (Black Lawrence Press, 2011)
- The Ancient Murrelet (Alice Greene & Co., 2013)
- Fidelities (Alice Greene & Co., 2015)
- The Bird-while (Wayne State University Press, 2017)

=== Anthologies as editor ===
- The Huron River: Voices from the Watershed ed. Keith Taylor and John Knott (The University of Michigan Press, 2000)
- What These Ithakas Mean: Readings in Cavafy ed. Artemis Leontis, Lauren Talalay, and Keith Taylor (Athens, Greece: E.L.I.A., 2002)
- Ghost Writers: Us Haunting Them ed. Keith Taylor and Laura Kasischke (Wayne State University Press, 2011)

=== Translations ===
Battered Guitars: The Poetry and Prose of Kostas Karyotakis (University of Birmingham, 2006)

== Sources ==
- http://www.keithtaylorannarbor.com/biography.html
- http://www.keithtaylorannarbor.com/publications.html
