= Patricia Meyer Spacks =

American literary scholar (born 1929)

Patricia Ann Meyer Spacks (born November 17, 1929) is an American literary scholar. She is the Edgar F. Shannon Professor Emerita at the University of Virginia and former president of the American Academy of Arts and Sciences and of the Modern Language Association. She specializes in eighteenth-century English literature and also writes cultural criticism on varied subjects such as boredom, gossip, and feminism. According to the scholar Eileen Gillooly, "With remarkable breadth of reference, Spacks has written more extensively than any other feminist critic on eighteenth- and nineteenth-century English narrative."

== Life ==
Patricia Meyer was born on November 17, 1929, to Lillian (Talcott) and Norman Meyer in San Francisco, California. She received a B.A. from Rollins College in 1949, an M.A. from Yale University in 1950, and a Ph.D. from the University of California in 1955. From 1955 to 1978 she was married to poet Barry Spacks.

Spacks has chaired English departments at Wellesley College, Yale University, and the University of Virginia. In 1996, she was elected to the American Philosophical Society. She was the first humanities scholar in residence at the American Academy of Arts and Sciences before becoming the Academy's president from 2001 to 2006. Spacks received the Guggenheim Fellowship, a fellowship from the National Endowment for the Humanities, and an honorary doctorate from Rollins College. She has been the chair of the board of directors of the American Council of Learned Societies and a trustee of the National Humanities Center.

== Selected works ==
- Imagining a Self: Autobiography and Novel in Eighteenth-Century England (1976)
- The Adolescent Idea: Myths of Youth and the Adult Imagination (1981)
- Gossip (1985)
- Desire and Truth: Functions of Plot in Eighteenth-Century English Novels (1990)
- Boredom: The Literary History of a State of Mind (1995)
- Privacy: Concealing the Eighteenth-Century Self (2003)
- Novel Beginnings: Experiments in Eighteenth-Century English Fiction (2006)
- On Rereading (2011)
