= Sheila Black =

American poet

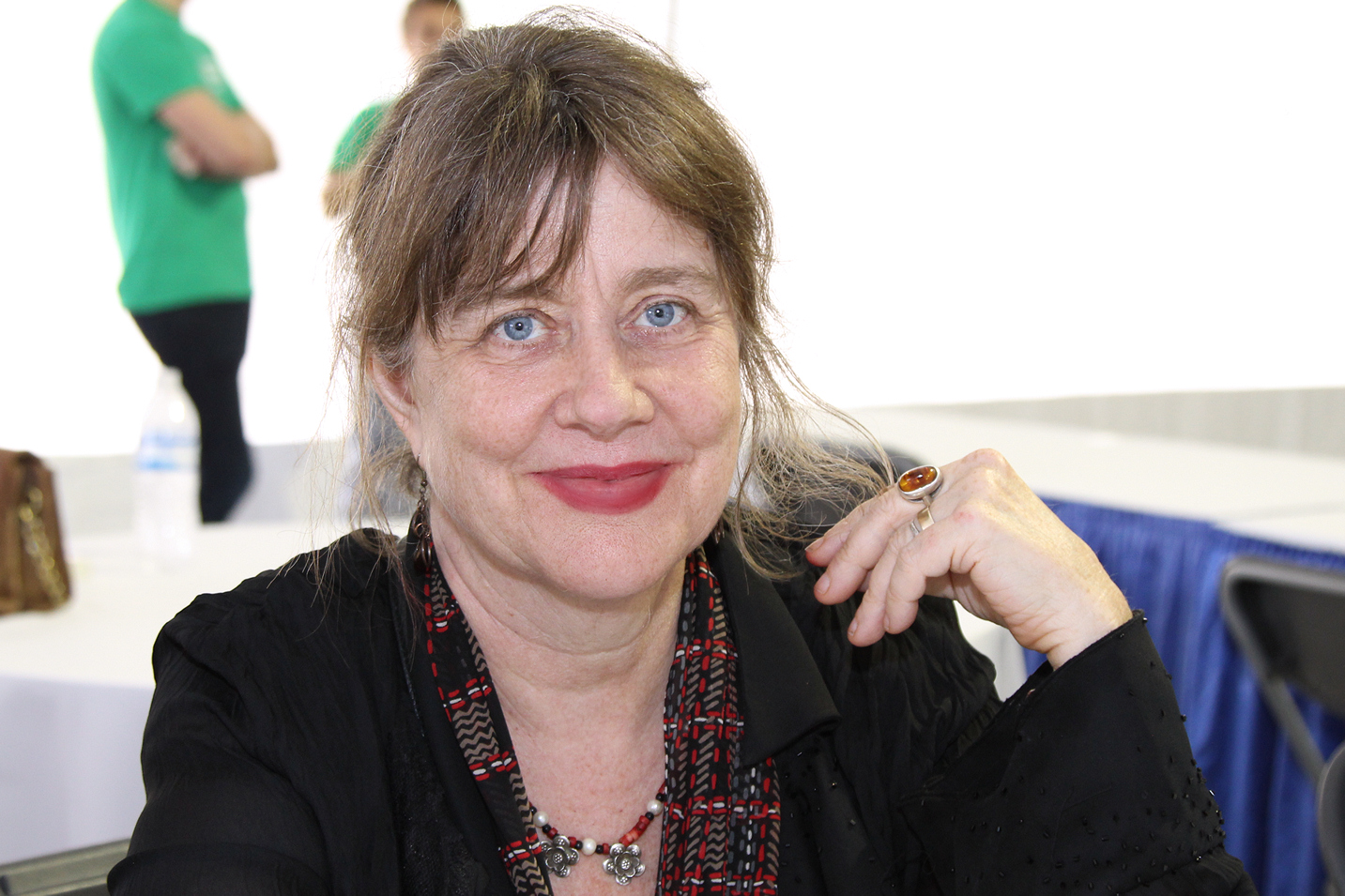
- Black at the 2017 Texas Book Festival
- Occupation: Poet, children's writer
- Education: Barnard College (BA); University of Montana (MFA)
- Notable works: Beauty is a Verb: The New Poetry of Disability

Sheila Black is an American poet and children's writer. Black is the author of five poetry collections. She was a U.S. co-winner of the Frost-Pellicer Frontera Prize in 2000 and received a Witter Bynner Fellowship in 2012.

== Life and career ==
Black earned a BA from Barnard College and an MFA in poetry from the University of Montana. Black taught part-time at New Mexico State University and worked as development director for the Colonias Development Council.

Black has written about having X-linked hypophosphatemia (XLH), a genetic condition historically referred to as vitamin-D-resistant rickets. In essays and interviews, she has discussed disability, embodiment, and disability poetics as subjects in her writing.

Black co-edited Beauty is a Verb: The New Poetry of Disability with Jennifer Bartlett and Michael Northen and co-founded Zoeglossia, a nonprofit organization for poets with disabilities.

== Themes and reception ==
Black's poetry has been discussed in relation to confessional writing. Her essay "Waiting to Be Dangerous: Disability and Confessionalism" appears in Beauty is a Verb: The New Poetry of Disability. Her poem "What You Mourn", from House of Bone, addresses bodily difference, medical intervention, and disability.

In a 2019 interview with Poetry International Online, Black described disability poetics as a poetics of "negative capability" and "a kind of praise of vulnerability". She said that she began to write with greater authenticity after she "came out" as a person with a disability around the age of forty.

A review of House of Bone in Wordgathering said Black's poems are "rooted in desire, emotion, and the sensual world". The review described the collection as structured so that disability appears in its middle section rather than defining the whole book, making disability one part of the collection's larger treatment of embodiment, language, and experience. In Ploughshares, Robert Boswell called House of Bone "a complex and surprising collection, a very mature first book of poetry".

== Selected works ==
=== Poetry collections ===
- House of Bone. CustomWords, 2007. ISBN 9781933456621
- Love/Iraq. WordTech Communications, 2009. ISBN 9781934999752
- Wen Kroy. Dream Horse Press, 2013. ISBN 9781935716266
- Iron, Ardent. Educe Press, 2017. ISBN 9780996571647
- Radium Dream. Salmon Poetry, 2022. ISBN 9781915022110

=== Collaborative works ===
- Continental Drift, with Michele Marcoux. Patriothall Gallery, Edinburgh, 2010.

=== Anthology ===
- Beauty is a Verb: The New Poetry of Disability, co-edited with Jennifer Bartlett and Michael Northen. Cinco Puntos Press, 2011. ISBN 9781935955054

=== Children's books ===
- Patrick the Pup. Andrews and McMeel/Ariel Books, 1996. ISBN 9780836221138
- Will the Real Ms. X Please Report to the Principal!. Troll, 1998. ISBN 9780816748136
- Me and Maya, the Super Brain. McGraw-Hill School Division, 2000. ISBN 9780021852338
- Lassie. Puffin Books, 1994. ISBN 9780140368024
