= Carol Guess =

American poet and fiction writer (born 1968)

- Born: January 3, 1968 (age 58); Bethesda, Maryland, U.S.
- Education: Columbia University; Indiana University
- Occupations: Poet; fiction writer; novelist; essayist

Carol Guess (born January 3, 1968) is an American poet and fiction writer.

== Biography ==
Guess attended Columbia University, majoring in English while studying ballet. She later earned graduate degrees in Creative Writing and English from Indiana University. Currently Professor of English at Western Washington University, she lives in Bellingham, Washington. Guess is a lesbian. Her books Homeschooling, Femme's Dictionary, and Gaslight were nominated for Lambda Literary Awards. Switch was a finalist for the American Library Association's Stonewall Book Award in 1999. In 2014 she was awarded the Philolexian Award for Distinguished Literary Achievement by the Philolexian Society of Columbia University.

== Selected publications ==
- Infodemic, Black Lawrence Press, 2024.
- Sleep Tight Satellite, Tupelo Press, October 2023.
- Book of Non (co-written with Rochelle Hurt), Broadstone Books, July 2023.
- Girl Zoo (co-written with Aimee Parkison), FC2, 2019.
- True Ash (co-written with Elizabeth J. Colen), Black Lawrence Press, August 2018.
- Instructions for Staging (co-written with Kristina Marie Darling), Broadstone Books, 2017.
- Human-Ghost Hybrid Project (co-written with Daniela Olszewska), Black Lawrence Press, 2017.
- The Reckless Remainder (co-written with Kelly Magee), Noctuary Press, 2016.
- Your Sick (co-written with Elizabeth J. Colen and Kelly Magee), Jellyfish Highway Press, 2016.
- With Animal (co-written with Kelly Magee), Black Lawrence Press, 2015.
- How to Feel Confident with Your Special Talents (co-written with Daniela Olszewska), Black Lawrence Press, 2014.
- X Marks The Dress: A Registry (co-written with Kristina Marie Darling), Gold Wake Press, 2013.
- F IN (Noctuary Press, 2013)
- Index Of Placebo Effects (Matter Press, 2012)
- Doll Studies: Forensics (Black Lawrence Press, 2012)
- Darling Endangered (Brooklyn Arts Press, 2011)
- My Father In Water (Shearsman Books, 2011)
- Homeschooling (PS Publishing, 2010)
- Love Is A Map I Must Not Set On Fire (VRZHU Press, 2009)
- Tinderbox Lawn (Rose Metal Press, 2008)
- Femme's Dictionary (Calyx Books, 2004)
- Gaslight (Odd Girls Press, 2001)
- Switch (Calyx Books, 1998)
- Seeing Dell (Cleis Press, 1996)
