= Jen Michalski =

American writer of fiction (born 1972)

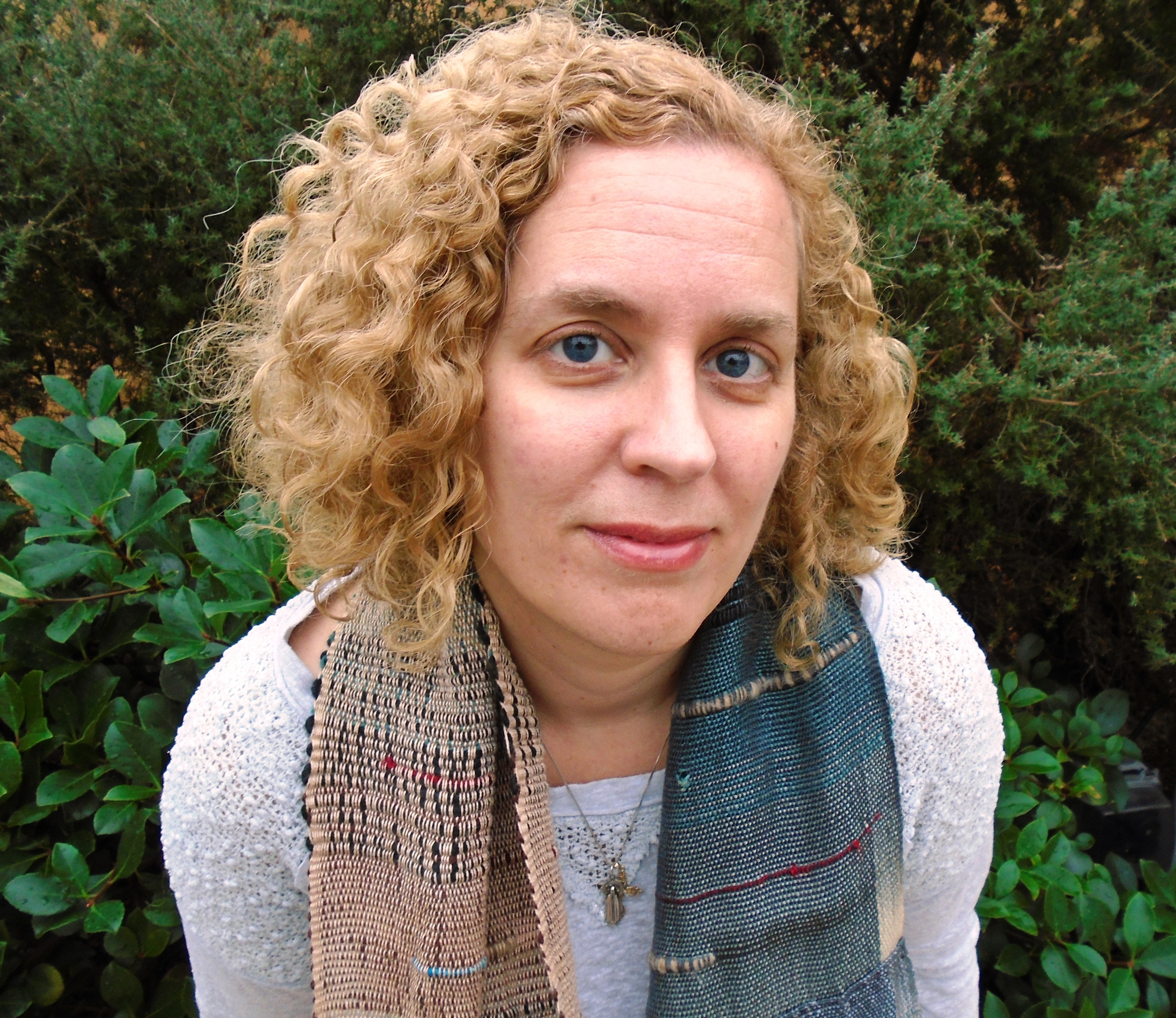
- Jen Michalski (2014)
- Born: 1972 (age 53–54)
- Education: St. Mary's College of Maryland (BA); Towson University (MS)
- Occupation: Novelist
- Writing career
- Language: English
- Years active: 2012—present
- Genre: LGBT Literature, Science-fiction
- Notable awards: Big Moose Prize

Jen Michalski (born 1972) is an American fiction author and novelist.

== Biography ==
She received her BA in Language and Literature from St. Mary's College of Maryland in 1994 and an MS in Professional Writing from Towson University in 1999. She has since remained in Baltimore.

Her debut novel, The Tide King, was published by Black Lawrence Press in 2013 (2012 winner of BLP's Big Moose Prize). Her second novel, The Summer She Was Under Water, was published by Queens Ferry Press in 2016 and was acquired by Black Lawrence Press in 2017. Her collection of novellas Could You Be With Her Now was published in 2013 by Dzanc Books, and she also authored two collections of fiction, From Here (Aqueous Books, 2013) and Close Encounters (So New, 2007).

She edited the book City Sages: Baltimore (CityLit Press, 2010), an anthology of Baltimore writers past and present, and published a chapbook, Cross Sections, with Publishing Genius Press in 2008.

Her fiction has been published in journals such as The Collagist, Blue Lake Review, and others. Michalski is actively involved in the literary community, running the online literary quarterly jmww since 2004 and co-hosting the monthly fiction reading series, The 510 Readings, in Baltimore from 2007-2014 with writer Michael Kimball and currently hosting the monthly fiction reading series, Starts Here!

== Awards and accolades ==
Year	Award	Organisation	Work	Result
2012	Big Moose Prize	Black Lawrence Press	The Tide King	Won

== Bibliography ==
The Tide King (2013)

Close Encounters (2013)

Could You Be With Her Now (2013)

The Summer She Was Under Water (2017)

You'll Be Fine (2021)
