= Corinne Demas =

American poet

- Education: Tufts University; Columbia University (PhD)
- Occupations: Writer, College professor
- Writing career
- Period: 1969 to present
- Genres: Fiction, Children's literature, Memoir, Poetry
- Website: www.corinnedemas.com

Corinne Demas is the award winning author of five novels, two collections of short stories, a collection of poetry, a memoir, two plays, and numerous books for children. She has published more than fifty short stories in a variety of magazines and literary journals. Her publications before 2000 are under the name Corinne Demas Bliss.

== Personal ==
Corinne Demas grew up in New York City, in Stuyvesant Town, the subject of her memoir, Eleven Stories High, Growing Up in Stuyvesant Town, 1948-1968. She attended Hunter College High School, graduated from Tufts University, and completed a Ph.D. in English and Comparative Literature at Columbia University.

She lived in Pittsburgh for a decade, teaching at the University of Pittsburgh and at Chatham College. In 1978 she moved to New England and began teaching at Mount Holyoke College in South Hadley, Massachusetts, where she is now professor emerita of English. A fiction editor of The Massachusetts Review, she is a member of The Authors Guild, PEN, and the Society of Children's Book Writers and Illustrators. She resides in Western Massachusetts and on Cape Cod.

== Awards ==
- Aesthetica Creative Writing Award, Fiction Winner 2015.
- ASPCA Henry Bergh Children’s Book Award for Saying Goodbye to Lulu.
- Finalist, Massachusetts Book Award 2001, The Disappearing Island.
- PEN Syndicated Fiction Competition winner.
- Lawrence Foundation Prize for the best story to appear in Michigan Quarterly Review.
- Breakthrough Contest winner, University of Missouri Press.
- National Endowment for the Arts Creative Writing Fellowships.
- Andrew W. Mellon Foundation Fellowship.

== Publications ==
=== Books ===
- Returning to Shore (YA novel), Carolrhoda Lab/Lerner Publishing Group, 2014
- Everything I Was (YA novel), Carolrhoda Lab/Lerner Publishing Group, 2011
- The Writing Circle (novel), Hyperion/Voice, July 2010. Paperback, 2011. German edition: Das Herz de Täuschung, Diana Verlag, 2012.
- The Donkeys Postpone Gratification (poetry collection), Finishing Line Press, 2009.
- Great American Short Stories: From Hawthorne to Hemingway (editor), Barnes & Noble Classics Series, 2004.
- Eleven Stories High: Growing Up in Stuyvesant Town, 1948—1968 (memoir), State University of New York Press, 2000. Paperback, 2002.
- If Ever I Return Again (middle-grade novel), HarperCollins, 2000. French edition: Si Je Reviens, Bayard Jeunesse, 2002.
- What We Save for Last (short story collection), Milkweed Editions, 1992.
- Daffodils or the Death of Love (short story collection), University of Missouri Press, 1983.
- The Same River Twice (novel), Athenaeum, 1982.

=== Children's picture books and easy readers ===
- The Grumpy Pirate (picture book, co-author Artemis Roehrig, illustrated by Ashlyn Anstee), Scholastic, 2020.
- Do Jellyfish Like Peanut Butter? (picture book, co-author Artemis Roehrig, illustrated by Ellen Shi), Persnickety Press 2020.
- Do Doodlebugs Doodle? (picture book, co-author Artemis Roehrig, illustrated by Ellen Shi), Persnickety Press, 2018.
- Are Pirates Polite? (picture book, co-author Artemis Roehrig, illustrated by David Catrow), Scholastic, 2016.
- Does a Fiddler Crab Fiddle? (picture book, co-author Artemis Roehrig, paintings by John Sandford), Persnickety Press, 2016.
- Here Comes Trouble! (picture book, illustrated by Noah Z. Jones), Scholastic, 2013.
- Halloween Surprise (picture book, illustrated by R. W. Alley), Walker & Company, 2011.
- Pirates Go To School (picture book, illustrated by John Manders), Orchard Books/Scholastic, 2011. French edition: Pirates À L’École, Scholastic, 2013.
- Always in Trouble (picture book, illustrated by Noah Z. Jones), Scholastic, 2009.
- Valentine Surprise (picture book, illustrated by R. W. Alley), Walker & Company, 2008. Paperback, 2009.
- Yuck! Stuck in the Muck (leveled reader, illustrated by Laura Rader), Scholastic, 2006.
- Two Christmas Mice, Holiday House (picture book, illustrated by Stephanie Roth), 2005.
- Saying Goodbye to Lulu, (picture book, illustrated by Ard Hoyt), Little, Brown, 2004. Paperback, 2009.
- The Magic Apple (retelling of a Jewish folktale, illustrated by Alexi Natchev), Golden Books, 2002. Random House, 2004.
- The Boy Who was Generous With Salt, (picture book, illustrated by Michael Hays), Cavendish Children's Books, Marshall Cavendish, 2002.
- The Perfect Pony (leveled reader), Random House, 2000.
- Nina's Waltz (picture book, illustrated by Deborah Lanino), Orchard Books, 2000.
- The Disappearing Island (picture book, illustrated by Ted Lewin), Simon & Schuster, 2000.
- Hurricane! (picture book), Cavendish Children's Books, Marshall Cavendish, 2000.
- The Littlest Matryoshka (picture book, illustrated by Kathryn Brown), Hyperion Books for Children, 1999.
- Snow Day (sequel to The Shortest Kid in the World, illustrated by Nancy Poydar), Random House, 1998.
- Electra and the Charlotte Russe (picture book, illustrated by Michael Garland), Boyds Mills Press, 1997.
- The Shortest Kid in the World (leveled reader, illustrated by Nancy Poydar), Random House, 1995.
- Matthew's Meadow (environmental fable, illustrated by Ted Lewin), Harcourt Brace, 1992. Voyager Books (paperback), 1997.

Adapted for stage by the Regional Touring Theatre Company of Western Illinois University (produced Spring, 1994).

- That Dog Melly! (picture book, illustrated by the author), Hastings House,1981.

=== Short stories ===
- "Thanksgiving," Aesthetica Creative Writing Anthology, 2014. Winner of the Aesthetica Creative Writing Award in Fiction, 2015.
- "The Clock," Notre Dame Review, No. 37 (Winter/Spring, 2014).
- "Last Stars," Notre Dame Review, No. 22 (Summer, 2006).
- "After the Abernathys," The Women’s Times, Vol. 7, No. 4 (August, 2005).
- "In Memory of a Lovely Afternoon," The Kenyon Review, Vol. XXII, Nos. 3/4 (Summer, Fall, 2000).
- "The Village," Notre Dame Review, No. 2 (Summer, 1996).
- "Mirrors," American Literary Review, Vol. VI, No.1 (Spring, 1995).
- "Certain Treacheries," Harvard Review, No. 3 (Winter, 1993).
- "Learning Greek," The Southern Review, Vol.28, No.3 (July, 1992).
- "In the Perfect Privacy of His Own Mind," Glimmer Train, Issue No. 2 (Spring, 1992).
- "Luba By Night," Fiction, Vol. 10, Nos. 1 & 2 (Spring, 1991).
- "Swimming to Albania," Shenandoah, Vol. 41, No. 1 (Spring, 1991).
- "The Other Side," The Agni Review, 28, (Spring, 1989).
- "Small Sins," Columbia, Vol. 14, No. 4 (February–March, 1989).
- "Birthday Card." Special Report: Fiction, (February–April,1989).
- "Forbidden Waters," The Virginia Quarterly Review, Vol. 64, (Winter 1988).
- "Breaking Trail," The Providence Journal Sunday Magazine, (December 15, 1988).
- "Babylove," The Agni Review, 24/25 (Fall, 1987). Reprinted in Birth, A Literary Companion, edited by Kristin Kovacic and Lynne Barrett, University of Iowa Press. Fall, 2002.
- "The Dream Broker," Redbook, (July, 1987).
- "The Cutting Edge of the Snow," O. Henry Festival Stories, 1987
- "Memorial Day," (PEN Syndicated Fiction Competition winner) San Francisco Chronicle (May 24, 1987); St. Petersburg Times (May 30, 1987); Kansas City Star (June 12, 1988). Produced by National Public Radio for NPR Playhouse: The Sound of Writing II.
- "What We Save for Last" The Providence Journal Sunday Magazine, January 3, 1987, New England Living, December, 1990.
- "Payment" (originally titled "Reparations") McCall's, (August, 1986).
- "Headlines," Michigan Quarterly Review, Vol. XXIV, No. 3 (Summer, 1985). (winner of the Lawrence Foundation Prize.)
- "American Authors Incorporated," Fiction Monthly, Vol. 2, No. 10 (Summer, 1985).
- "Separate Lives," The Agni Review, 22 (Spring, 1985).
- "Among the Lettuce," Cutbank 23, (Spring, 1985).
- "Ears," The Boston Review, Vol. IX, No. 5 (October, 1984).
- "Margaret, Are You Grieving?," Mademoiselle, (April, 1984).
- "Consuming Passion," (originally titled "Pizza") Mademoiselle, (February,1984).
- "Third Street," The Boston Globe Magazine, (December 6, 1981).
- "Lester Schwabb I, II, III, IV, V," Ploughshares Special Fiction Issue, (Fall, 1980).
- "Roommates," (originally titled "Peter Rabbit") Esquire, Vol. 93, No. 4 (April, 1980).
- "Light Boat," The Madison Review, Vol. 1, No. 1 (Spring, 1979).
- "Mt. Kisco," The Old Red Kimona, Vol. VII (Spring, 1979).
- "Secrets," Secrets and Other Stories by Women, Gallimaufry 14, 1979.
- "Horse Throws Rider in Field," Newsart, The New York Smith, Vol. 2, No. 5 (August, 1978).
- "Daffodils or the Death of Love," The Agni Review, 9 (Fall, 1978).
- "Rings," The Ohio Review, Vol. XVIII, No. 3 (Fall, 1977).
- "McCaferty and Sons," Tales, Vol. 3, No. 1 (Fall, 1976).
- "Mr. Lundy," Kansas Quarterly, Vol. 8, Nos. 3-4 (Summer-Fall, 1976).
- "Slow Moose," Transatlantic Review, Nos. 53/54 (February, 1976).
- "Traveling During Pregnancy," The Little Magazine, Vol. 8, Nos. 3-4 (Fall-Winter, 1975–76).
- "Fly," Women Becoming, Vol. 2, No. 1 (February, 1974).
- "Holy Grail," Fragments, Vol. XIV, No. 1 (1973).
- "Winter-Tight Lodgings," Southern Humanities Review, Vol. 7, No. 4 (Fall,1973).

=== Selected Non-fiction ===
- "Introduction to Ambrosia by Lee Upton," The Massachusetts Review, Working Titles, February, 2016.
- "How to Get the Most Out of a Writing Group," The Literary Digest: Chuck Sambuchino's Guide to Literary Agents Blog, April 18, 2011.
- "An Author's Adventures in Clamming," The Huffington Post, August 4, 2010
- Letter to the Editor, “Her So-Called Life (Fact-Checking Required.”) The New York Times, March 7, 2008.
- “Our Town,” Op-Ed, The New York Times, Sunday, September 3, 2006.
- Letter to the Editor, response to "The Upscaling of Stuyvesant Town," The New York Times, February 18, 2001.
- "An Accidental Utopia", The New York Times, Sunday, November 19, 2000.
- Review of The Tales of Arturo Vivante, Harvard Review, Premier Issue (Spring, 1992).
- "Coyotes," Columbia (Summer 1990).
- "Against the Current: A Conversation with Anita Desai," The Massachusetts Review, Vol. XXIX, No. 3 (Fall, 1988). Reprinted in Anita Desai: Critical Perspectives, edited by Devindra Kohli and Melanie Maria Just, Pencraft International, 2008.

=== Poetry ===
- "The Pond Alone," Turtle Island Quarterly (Spring, 2018).
- "The House on North Lane, Hadley," "Amherst Bear," and "Turkeys on the Track Near Mount Toby," Compass Road, Poems about the Pioneer Valley, edited by Jane Yolen, Levellers Press, 2018.
- "Melon," featured poem in Nourish the Body, Nourish the Soul: Northampton “April is Poetry” Celebration, 2013.
- "The Donkeys Stand on the Manure Pile," 5 AM, Issue #29 (Spring, 2009).
- "Smalls," New England Watershed Magazine, June/July 2006.
- "To You There in Dayton" and "Diaphragm Poem," Images, Vol. 4, No. 1 (Fall, 1977).
- "Pact," Poetry &, Vol. 2, No. 1 (July–August, 1977).
- "Blue Hole," Poetry &, Vol. 1, No. 11 (June, 1977).

=== Plays ===
- Family Business (2012)
- Blue Straw Hat (2009)
