= Daniel Chacón (writer) =

Chicano American author and educator

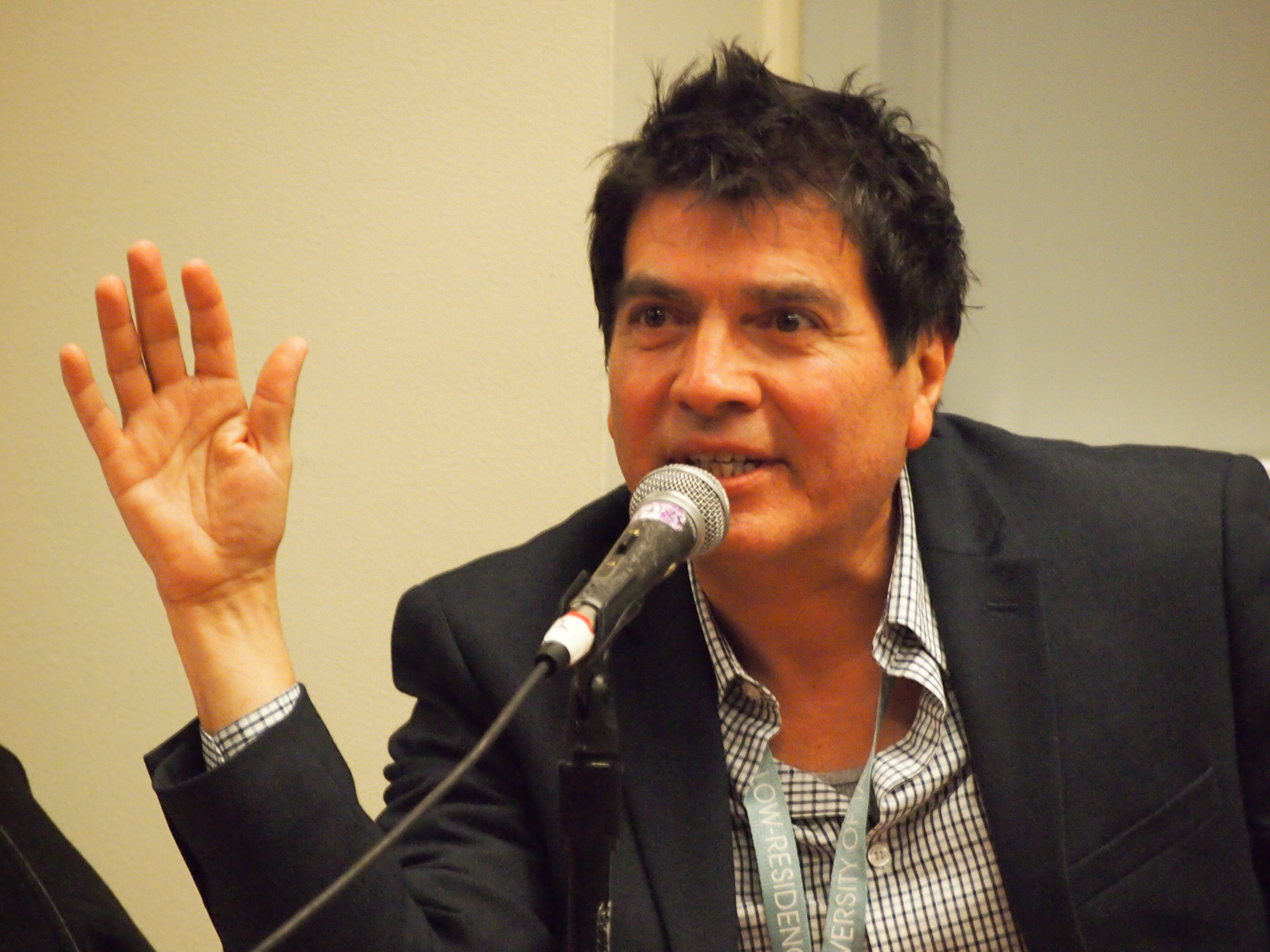
- Chacón at AWP 2017
- Born: 1962 (age 63–64); Fresno, California, U.S.
- Education: California State University, Fresno (BA); University of Oregon (MFA)
- Occupations: Writer, educator
- Writing career
- Language: English
- Genres: Fiction, Chicano literature
- Notable awards: American Book Awards; Hudson Prize; PEN Oakland Award

Daniel Chacón (born 1962) is a Chicano short story writer, novelist, essayist, editor, professor, and radio host based in El Paso, Texas. He chairs the University of Texas at El Paso creative writing graduate program, the country's only bilingual MFA program. He founded the Chicano Writers and Artists Association with Fresno State classmate and close friend Andrés Montoya in 1985.

== Early life ==
Chacón was born and raised in Fresno, California; his father was from El Paso, Texas. One of his brothers is writer Kenneth Robert Chacón, from whom he was estranged for many years. He earned a BA in political science from California State University, Fresno and an MFA in fiction writing from the University of Oregon. While at CSU, he wrote for the campus newspaper La Voz de Aztlan.

== Career ==
Chacón joined the MFA program at University of Texas at El Paso as an assistant professor in Creative Writing in 2000 and has been the department chair since 2017. Since 2011, he has co-hosted the KTEP show Words on a Wire; his original co-host was Benjamin Alire Sáenz and is now Tim Z. Hernandez. Guests include Alison Hawthorne Deming, Francisco Aragón, and Garrett Hongo. He serves at the assistant director of the Alisa Ann Ruch Burn Foundation and was appointed chair for the International Association of Burn Camps' Board of Directors in 2018, and is part of the Southwest Festival of the Written Word's advisory board.

He has also edited several books, including A Jury of Trees (a posthumous collection of poetry by Andrés Montoya) (2017), The Last Supper of Chicano Heroes: The Selected Work of José Antonio Burciaga (2008; with Mimi Reisel Gladstein) and Colón-ization: The Posthumous Poems of Andrés Montoya (2017). His writing has also appeared in several anthologies: Caliente: The Best Erotic Writing in Latin American Fiction (2002), Lengua Fresca: Latinos Writing on the Edge (2006), and Best of the West 2009: New Stories from the West Side of the Missouri (2009), among others. Journals that have published his work include ZYZZYVA, Americas Review, Bilingual Review, Colorado Review, New England Review, and Callaloo. He also dabbles in playwrighting, standup, and poetry.

== Personal life ==
Chacón is married and has a step-daughter. His first child was born in 2020. He began speaking Spanish in 1996.

== Awards and honors ==
Chacón has received a grant from the Christopher Isherwood Foundation and was inducted into the Texas Institute of Letters in 2019.

Year	Book	Award Name	Award Body	Reference
2000	Godoy Lives	Peter and Jean de Maine Award for an Emerging Writer in Fiction	Clackamas Literary Review	
2007	Unending Rooms	Hudson Prize	Black Lawrence Press	
2009	The Last Supper of Chicano Heroes: Selected Works of José Antonio Burciaga	American Book Awards	Before Columbus Foundation	
2014	Hotel Juárez	PEN Oakland/Josephine Miles Literary Award	PEN Oakland	
2014	Hotel Juárez	Tejas Award for Best Book of Fiction	National Association of Chicana and Chicano Studies	

== Selected works ==
Title	Publisher	Date	Length	ISBN
Chicano Chicanery	Arte Público Press	1996	144 pp (paperback)	978-1611920918
From Mexico City to Aztlan Oregon, in bittersweet comic fables and through tales of frightening realism, Daniel Chacon captures the shrewd, furtive, and sometimes torturous ways by which Mexican-Americans manage to survive in intimidating territory.
and the shadows took him	Washington Square Press	2005	352 pp (paperback)	978-0743466394
Joey Molina had never been in a fight. The very thought of violence upset him. He only wanted to be an actor, and so he read plays and learned new words with his mother. When he's cast in the lead role in the school play, he's eager to go home and tell his family about it, but his parents have an announcement of their own.
Unending Rooms	Black Lawrence Press	2008	235 pp (paperback)	978-0981589930
The winner of the Hudson Prize, this collection of stories, mainly set in the Southwest, digs deep into the lives of its characters. Daniel Chacon's writing is very lucid and dips into Carveresque plain talk at times, but he isn't afraid to use pretty descriptions as well.
Hotel Juárez	Arte Público Press	2012	197 pp (paperback)	978-1558857681
In this collection of short and flash fiction, Daniel Chacón examines peoples' interactions with each other, the impact of identity and the importance of literature, art and music.
The Cholo Tree	Piñata Books	2017	248 pp (paperback)	978-1558858404
Fourteen-year-old Victor has just been released from the hospital after barely surviving being shot. His mother accuses him of being a cholo, something he denies, but she's not the only adult that thinks he's a gangbanger. His sociology teacher sent him to a teach-in on gange violence, and other kids think he's in a gang. The truth is, he loves death metal, reading books, and drawing, but he can't seem to overcome society's expectations of him.
Kafka in a Skirt: Stories from the Wall	University of Arizona Press	2019	168 pp (paperback)	978-0816539918
These stories explore the concept of a wall that reaches beyond our immediate thoughts of a towering physical structure. While Chacón aims to address the partition along the U.S.-Mexico border, he also uses these stories to work through the intangible walls that divide communities and individuals—particularly those who straddle multiple cultures in their daily lives.
