= Indiana Review =

American literary magazine

- Discipline: Literary magazine
- Language: English

Publication details
- History: 1976 to present
- Publisher: Indiana University Bloomington (United States)
- Frequency: bi-annual

Standard abbreviations
- ISO 4: Indiana Rev.

Indexing
- ISSN: 0738-386X

Links
- Journal homepage

Indiana Review (IR) is a small, student-run literary magazine at Indiana University Bloomington. Founded in 1976, it has a circulation of about 2,000.

A biannual review, IR publishes essays, fiction, graphic arts, interviews, poetry, and reviews. IR is funded mainly by subscriptions, contests, grants, and partially by university support.

Works by contributors to IR have been awarded the Pushcart Prize and reprinted in The Pushcart Prize Anthology: Best of the Small Presses, as well as in the O. Henry Awards, Best American Short Stories, Best American Poetry, and Best New American Voices. In addition, Indiana Review is recognized as one of the top 50 fiction markets by Writer's Digest and in 1996 was selected as the first-place winner of the American Literary Magazine Award.

Past contributors include: Denise Duhamel, Yusef Komunyakaa, Stuart Dybek, Sherman Alexie, Gary Soto, Philip Levine, Peter Selgin, Lucia Perillo, Campbell McGrath, Terrance Hayes, Richard Blanco, Rafael Campo, Cornelius Eady, Marilyn Chin, Martin Espada, Roxane Gay, Ha Jin, David Kirby, Bob Hicok, Reginald Shepherd, Ursula K. Le Guin, Patrick Rosal, Peter Tieryas, Chitra Divakaruni and Paul Martínez Pompa.

== See also ==
- List of literary magazines
