= Barry Spacks =

American writer

Barry Bernard Spacks
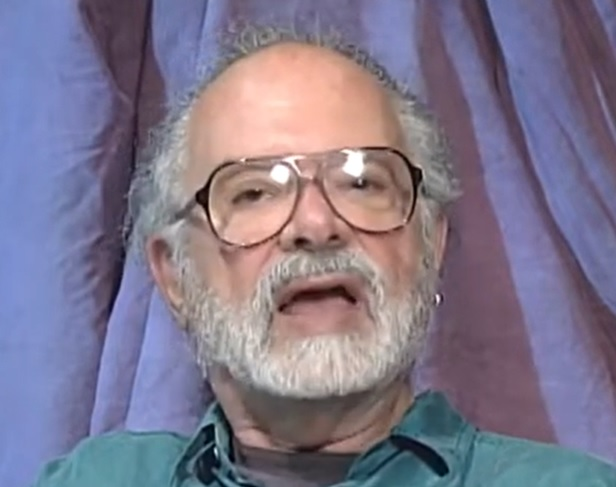
- Barry Bernard Spacks, December 2008
- Born: Barry Bernard Spacks; February 21, 1931; Philadelphia, Pennsylvania, U.S.
- Died: January 28, 2014 (aged 82); Santa Barbara, California
- Education: University of Pennsylvania, Philadelphia (BA), Indiana University, Bloomington, Indiana (MA), Pembroke College, Cambridge, England
- Occupations: Poet, novelist, professor

Barry Bernard Spacks (February 21, 1931 – January 28, 2014), was a prize-winning poet, novelist and first poet laureate of Santa Barbara, California.

== Career ==
Born in Philadelphia, Pennsylvania, Spacks received his B.A. (honors) from the University of Pennsylvania, Philadelphia in 1952. He served in the United States Army Signal Corps in Korea at the end of the Korean War and was honorably discharged in 1954. He later used some of his experiences in Korea for his novel Orphans, published in 1972. In 1956 he received his M.A. from Indiana University, Bloomington, then studied at Pembroke College, Cambridge, England, as a Fulbright scholar from 1956 to 1957. He taught writing and literature at MIT from 1960 to 1981, then taught in the English Department and the College of Creative Studies at University of California, Santa Barbara for 32 years. He was poet laureate of the City of Santa Barbara from 2005 to 2007.

A recipient of the St. Botolph's Arts Award, Spacks published nine poetry collections, the most extensive being Spacks Street: New and Selected Poems, which won the Commonwealth Club of California's Poetry Medal. He was also an accomplished librettist, singer-songwriter, artist and actor.

He was married to professor and writer Patricia Meyer Spacks from 1955 to 1978 and had a daughter, artist/coach Jude Spacks.

Starting in 1991, he and his second wife, the author Kimberley Snow, spent six years living in a Tibetan Buddhist community in Northern California where they studied Dzogchen with Chagdud Tulku Rinpoche, working in the kitchen, setting up a website for the community, and editing dharma books.

Spacks was the advisor for Into the Teeth of the Wind, an annual poetry magazine sponsored by UCSB's College of Creative Studies. In the magazine's 2014 edition, which was dedicated to Spacks, editor Mel Rosenberg wrote in her editor's note: "He was the guide and advisor to this publication for many years and will continue to be its heart for many more."

Former United States Poet Laureate Robert Pinsky said of Spacks, "Barry Spacks, as many have noted, was a profoundly youthful, bright spirit, a quality that infused his writing and his social presence." Author Tobias Wolff wrote that he kept Spacks' poem "Like a Prism" hanging above his typewriter. He also said of Spacks' story collection There's Always a Girl, "As witty as these stories are, both in conception and the writing itself, they never lose sight of the humanity of the people at their heart."

The poet Teddy Macker, a colleague of Spacks, wrote of his work: "What an ear he had! What psychological insight! What red-bloodedness! What tonal range! What holy tomfoolery!"

Gunpowder Press, a small poetry press located in Santa Barbara, published Barry Spack's final book of poems, Shaping Water in 2015. The press also awards the annual Barry Spacks Poetry Prize in his honor.
