= Paul Martínez Pompa =

American poet

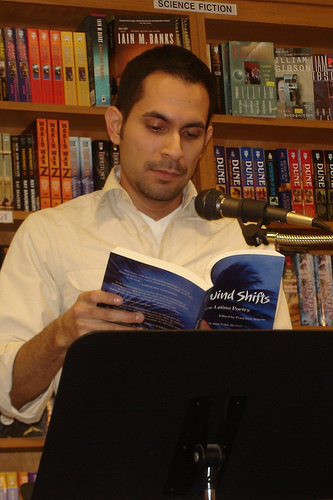
Paul Martínez Pompa

Paul Martínez Pompa is a Latino poet.

The author of My Kill Adore Him (University of Notre Dame Press, 2009), (selected by Martín Espada for the 2008 Andrés Montoya Poetry Prize) and the chapbook Pepper Spray (Momotombo Press, 2006). Martinez Pompa's poetry and prose have been anthologized in Telling Tongues and The Wind Shifts: New Latino Poetry. He earned degrees from the University of Chicago and Indiana University Bloomington, where he served as a poetry editor for Indiana Review. Martinez Pompa currently teaches at Triton College in River Grove, Illinois.
