= William Archila =

Latino poet and writer

- Born: William Archila; 1968; Santa Ana, El Salvador
- Education: University of Oregon
- Writing career
- Genre: Poetry
- Notable works: The Art of Exile, The Gravedigger's Archaeology
- Notable awards: Letras Latinas/Red Hen Poetry Prize International Latino Book Award

William Archila is a Latino poet and writer. Born in Santa Ana, El Salvador, Archila immigrated to the United States in 1980 with his family. Archila eventually became an English teacher and he earned an MFA from the University of Oregon.

His first book of poems, The Art of Exile, was published by Bilingual Review Press in 2009. His manuscript The Gravedigger's Archeology was selected by Orlando Ricardo Menes for the 2013 Letras Latinas/Red Hen Poetry Prize. Archila's poetry has appeared in AGNI, Blue Mesa Review, Crab Orchard Review, Notre Dame Review, Poet Lore, Poetry International, The Cortland Review, The Georgia Review, and The Los Angeles Review.

== Biography ==
=== Early life ===
William Archila was born in Santa Ana, El Salvador in 1968. He immigrated with his family to the United States in November 1980 due to the Civil War that was occurring in his country. Archila was only twelve when he was forced to move to Los Angeles, California. Knowing very little about the culture and language of the United States, Archila found it difficult to adapt to a completely new environment.

Twelve years after his arrival to the U.S. a peace treaty was signed, giving Archila the opportunity to return to his homeland. The Chapultepec Peace Accords brought peace to El Salvador in 1992 after more than a decade of civil war. At the age of twenty-four Archila returned to El Salvador with the hopes of reconnecting to the people, culture, and music of the place he saw as home. Unfortunately, in his return to El Salvador he felt a disconnect with the country and began to feel the effects of displacement. His disconnect was a direct result of both the aftermath of the Civil War and his long separation from his country because a lot had changed culturally and physically since the last time he had lived there.

After his visit, Archila returned to California and lived between Los Angeles and San Francisco. Throughout his childhood and even in his early adulthood Archila never had a secure home, which is why he was constantly on the move throughout California. This inability to lay a foundation for which he could call home led to Archila developing the idea of feeling exiled.

In an interview with the Library of Congress, Archila revealed "I began to have this feeling of homelessness that I didn’t belong neither here nor El Salvador; that I was not part of this America or the America of El Salvador, and I felt like a foreigner."

This feeling of exile and a loss of identity were the driving forces behind Archila's decision to write poetry. From these ideas, he was able to develop two of his most notable works: The Art of Exile and The Gravedigger's Archaeology.

=== Education ===
Upon his arrival from El Salvador in 1992 Archila began to write poetry related to his experience. In the beginning of his career as a poet Archila used his writing as a way of communicating his thoughts and coping with his immigrant experience. It wasn't until Archila made the decision to share his work with his close friends that he realized that there were others in the world who shared similar experiences to his and whose lives were impacted by his words. After this discovery, Archila made the decision to share his work locally and he gained fame throughout the Latino community in Los Angeles, California.

Archila's realization of his potential as a poet came when he attended a literary workshop in the Japanese American Museum led by Garrett Hongo. At the first workshop he hosted, Hongo advised Archila that he should think about attending the University of Oregon to develop his credibility and skills as a writer. It wasn't until Hong's second workshop that Archila was convinced to work professionally on his poetry. He eventually became an English teacher and earned his MFA in poetry from the University of Oregon.

Archila went on to publish two of his most notable works: The Art of Exile and The Gravedigger's Archaeology. Throughout his works, one may recognize the influences of authors such as Pablo Neruda, Roque Dalton, Claribel Alegria, John Milton, John Keats, and Gabriel García Márquez whose ideas and languages influenced the way he presented himself through his work.

== Awards and honors ==
- 2010 International Latino Book Award-Poetry for The Art of Exile
- 2015 Letras Latinas/Red Hen Poetry Prize for The Gravedigger's Archaeology
- Emerging Writer Fellowship Award from The Writer's Center in Bethesda, MD.
- His book was featured in "First Things First: the Fifth Annual Debut Poets Roundup" in Poets & Writers.

== Interviews ==
- Catalina Gomez, "Hispanic-American Poet William Archila Reading from his Works," U.S. Poetry at the Library of Congress (February 8, 2016): 50.
- Aaron Michael Morales, "An Interview with William Archila"
- Mariano Zaro, "William Archila - Poetry.LA Interview Series," Poetry.LA: 27

== Works ==
=== Art of Exile ===
The Art of Exile was published by the Bilingual Review Press in 2009. The book is a collection of poems that are focused on highlighting Archila's Salvadoran heritage and his immigration to the United States of America during the Salvadoran Civil War. In his book, Archila takes readers on a journey from Santa Ana, El Salvador to Los Angeles, California. The poems in the Art of Exile, which are based on Archila's memory of both El Salvador and Los Angeles, focus on themes related to displacement and identity. Through his poems Archila attempts to describe the process of being displaced from one's home country and the difficulty of finding one's identity due to the lack of connection with a specific culture and location. For this reason, The Art of Exile serves as a reclamation of the places and people lost to history.

=== The Gravedigger's Archaeology ===
The Gravedigger's Archaeology was published by the Red Hen Press in 2015 (red hen). This book is a collection of poems that provides detailed descriptions of the feeling of exile felt by Archila by focusing on his migrant experience. The book is concentrated on the US immigrant and the difficulties they face when trying to find their identity in places where they feel no connection to. Throughout his poems, Archila moves between the past and the present thereby giving insight into the physical and spiritual effects that the processes of displacement and exile have on one's life. Through his poems, Archila allows his readers to travel through the past and present, by providing descriptions of the civil war and its aftermath. In a lyrical language, Archila's poems reveal his desire to gain peace with his feeling of exile and he does so by taking his readers on a journey to find these answers, which can only be found in the ground.

== Bibliography ==
- The art of exile Tempe, Ariz. : Bilingual Press/Editorial Bilingüe, 2009. ISBN 9781931010528, OCLC 230916894
- The gravedigger's archaeology : poems, Pasadena, CA : Red Hen Press, 2015. ISBN 9781597093712, OCLC 894491569
