= Black Lawrence Press =

American independent publishing company

- Founded: 2004
- Founder: Colleen Ryor
- Country of origin: United States
- Distribution: Small Press Distribution
- Publication types: Books
- Official website: www.blacklawrence.com

Black Lawrence Press is an independent publishing company founded in upstate New York by Colleen Ryor. It was an imprint of Dzanc Books from 2008 to 2013. It hosts the Big Moose Prize for the novel, the Hudson Prize and the St. Lawrence Book Award. In addition to fiction and poetry, it also publishes French and German translations. The executive editor is Diane Goettel and the senior editor is Angela Leroux-Lindsey, who also manages The Adirondack Review.

Contemporary authors published by Black Lawrence include Mary Biddinger, Louella Bryant Daniel Chacón, B. C. Edwards, Rachel Galvin, Eric Gamalinda, Yvan Goll, Carol Guess, Michael Hemmingson, Hardy Jones, Lawrence Matsuda, Laura McCullough, Daniele Pantano, Pascale Petit, Kevin Pilkington, David Rigsbee, Ron Savage, Anis Shivani, Jen Michalski, and Erica Wright. Pilkington's "The Unemployed Man Who Became A Tree" was a finalist for the 2012 Kessler Poetry Book Award.

The press has also published the first English translation of Yvan Goll's Traumkraut and a collection of previously untranslated poems by Robert Walser.

Black Lawrence press published Louella Bryant's "While in Darkness There is Light: Idealism and Tragedy on an Australian Commune,” an account of the 1974 death of Charlie Dean (brother of future American presidential candidate Howard Dean) that drew national attention to the story of the younger Dean's disappearance.
