= Emma Trelles =

American poet

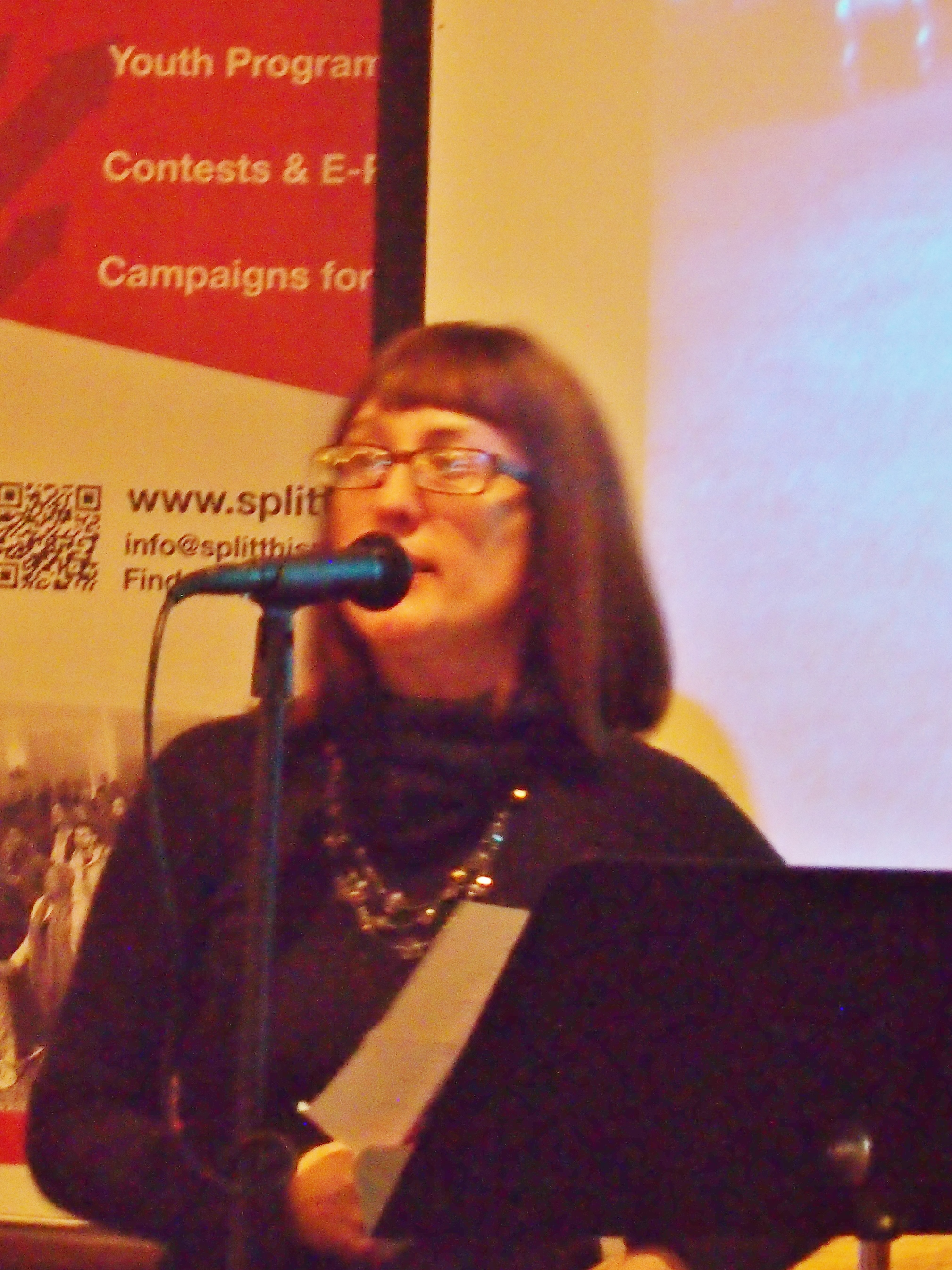
- Born: United States
- Education: Florida International University
- Occupation: Poet
- Writing career
- Language: English
- Notable awards: Andrés Montoya Poetry Prize
- Website: www.emmatrelles.com

Emma Trelles is a Latina poet, writer, and professor. She served as poet laureate of Santa Barbara, California from 2021–2023.

== Life ==
Trelles earned an MFA from Florida International University in the 1990s, where she was mentored by the poet Campbell McGrath and fiction writer John Dufresne. Trelles is a professor of composition and creative writing at Santa Barbara City College.

A contributor to the Best American Poetry blog, Trelles's poetry and prose have been anthologized in Ocho, Gulf Stream, Verse Daily, MiPOesias Magazine, The Rumpus and Tigertail: A South Florida Annual. Her journalism has been featured in the Miami Herald and the Sun-Sentinel. Her work appeared in Best American Poetry 2013. She is series editor for the Alta California Chapbook Series published by Gunpowder Press. In 2022, Trelles was name an Academy of American Poets Laureate Fellow.

Trelles has been the recipient of fellowships from the CantoMundo and the Florida Division of Cultural Affairs. Her book Tropicalia, was selected by Silvia Curbelo for the 2010 Andrés Montoya Poetry Prize. Tropicalia takes its title from the 1960s Brazilian arts movement of the same name.

== Works ==
- Tropicalia, University of Notre Dame Press, 2011, ISBN 978-0-268-04236-3
- Little Spells, CreateSpace, 2008, ISBN 978-1-4404-3390-0

=== Non-fiction ===
- Miami, Longstreet, 2001, ISBN 978-1-56352-519-3
