= Francisco X. Alarcón =

American poet

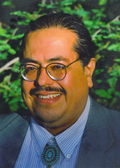
- Francisco X. Alarcón
- Born: Francisco Xavier Alarcón; 21 February 1954; Wilmington, California, U.S.
- Died: 15 January 2016 (aged 61); Davis, California, U.S.
- Education: California State University, Long Beach; Stanford University
- Writing career
- Language: Spanish; English
- Genre: Poetry
- Notable awards: 1993 American Book Award, PEN Oakland/Josephine Miles Literary Award

Francisco Xavier Alarcón (21 February 1954 – 15 January 2016) was an American Chicano poet and educator. He was one of the few Chicano poets to have "gained recognition while writing mostly in Spanish" within the United States. His poems have been also translated into Irish and Swedish. He made many guest appearances at public schools so that he could help inspire and influence young people to write their own poetry especially because he felt that children are "natural poets."

== Life ==
Alarcón was born in Wilmington, California and had four brothers and two sisters. He moved to Guadalajara, Mexico with his family when he was 6 and then moved back to California when he was eighteen. Alarcón felt that he became a writer when he was fifteen and helped transcribe his grandmother's own ballad-like songs. His grandmother was a native speaker of Nahuatl. Growing up in both the United States and Mexico and experiencing both cultures helped shape the kind of writing he would create.

As a young adult, he moved back to the Los Angeles area. He received his high school diploma from Cambria Adult School. He worked in restaurants and as a migrant farm worker. During this time, he went to East Los Angeles College.

Alarcón graduated from California State University, Long Beach with a bachelor's degree in history and spanish, and from Stanford University with a master's degree in Latin American literature. During college, he started writing poetry, belonged to many literary circles in the area and also read his poetry out loud at various venues. At Stanford, between 1978 and 1980, he edited the journal Vortice. In 1982, while on a Fulbright Fellowship to Mexico City, Alarcón discovered Aztec incantations translated by a Mexican priest . These later inspired the writing in Snake Poems: An Aztec Invocation. He also met his "soul mate," Mexican poet, Elías Nandino, on his trip to Mexico City. Alarcón was very impressed with how Nandino refused to hide his homosexuality from the world. During his time in Mexico, Alarcón was involved in the theatre in Mexico City and also did a lot of research at Colegio de México. The Fulbright grant also allowed him to travel to Cuba.

In 1984, Alarcón was considered a suspect in the murder of a young man, Teddy Gomez, who was killed in Golden Gate Park. He was held in jail for some time during the investigation with his bail set at $500,000. The investigation itself was considered "discriminatory." Alarcón felt that if he had been white, he never would have been considered a suspect. Others questioned the police department's actions and felt that they were also homophobic. Legal defense funds were raised, with Margarita Luna Robles organizing and leading the cause. The number of people who came to Alarcón's aid, visiting him in jail, speaking up on his behalf, praying for him showed how the Chicano community can come together during times of trouble. The actual murderer, William Melvin White, eventually confessed and Alarcón was cleared of all charges. Later, Alarcón sued the City of San Francisco because of the trauma the investigation caused. Alarcón was said to age visibly because of the ordeal. His book, Tattoos, reflects his experience as being a murder suspect.

Alarcón and fellow poets Juan Pablo Gutierrez and Rodrigo Reyes (director) founded Las Cuarto Espinas, the first gay Chicano poets collective, in 1985. Together, they published a collection of poetry titled Ya Vas Carnal.

He taught at the University of California, Davis, and is the co-author of Mundo 21, a Spanish-language method published by Cengage Learning. Mundo 21 is considered the best Spanish textbook on the market.

In response to a group of students chaining themselves to the Arizona State Capitol on April 20, 2010, to protest the anti-immigrant legislation Arizona SB 1070, Alarcón penned the poem "For the Capitol Nine" and posted it to his Facebook page. Prompted by the response to this poem, he created a Facebook group called "Poets Responding to SB 1070", which grew to include over 1200 poems and received over 600,000 hits. An anthology of poems from the group is being prepared for publication.

Alarcón judged the 2012 Andrés Montoya Poetry Prize.

He lived in Davis, California. He died of cancer on 15 January 2016.

== Poetry ==
Alarcón wrote poetry in English, Spanish and Nahuatl, often presented to the reader in a bilingual format. His poetry is considered minimalist in style. Alarcón revised as necessary, cutting out anything he didn't feel added to the poem. His sparse style has at times caused his poetry to be overlooked by critics who view his simplicity as not worthy of commentary. However, his choices of words, short lines and stanzas were very deliberate.

Alarcón did not plan his subject matter out in advance and did not write with a firm plan in mind. Instead, he allowed his poetry to form in an organic sense, where the poem grows naturally from his own feelings. His lyrical voice is said to move between "affirmation and self-erasure." He also thought that poetry is best read aloud. He did not use periods in his writing because he felt his poems were an extension of his life and a period would indicate the end, or his death. He said he tends to write his poetry on secretarial style, yellow blocks of paper by hand.

Alarcón's work from its earliest roots has been influenced by Aztec incantations and culture. Connection to his culture and language, both Spanish and English were important to him. Being able to speak more than one language was important to him and something he tried to impart to children and their caregivers. He saw language as "crucial for individual identity." Alarcón attempted to write his poetry in a bilingual fashion, but did not feel all concepts translate properly. Sometimes, the words he chose depended on language-specific concepts, such as gendered words in Spanish, which Alarcón played with in his poetry.

Alarcón was "highly-regarded" for his children's poetry. He started writing poetry for children in 1997 when he realized there were very few books for children written by Latino poets. It took him a few years to sell a publisher on the idea of bilingual poems for children, because publishers didn't think they would sell very well in the United States. Kirkus Reviews has called his work on the children's book, Animal Poems of the Iguazu, as "eloquently crafted." He has been praised for his depictions of Latino culture in his poetry for children. His children's poetry reflects a "genuine warmth and sense of play." Much of it is autobiographical, touching on his memories of his own childhood in such a way that helps children connect to their own family experiences. His descriptions of food are another universal theme that all children can relate to.

His poetry for adults is more nuanced and deals with issues involving same-sex relationships, violence and literary references. His poems have also been described as erotic and socially conscious. Alarcón is very careful to construct a sense of meaning and feeling in his poetry that expresses his experiences relating to homosexual desire. Snake Poems: An Aztec Invocation and De amor oscuro/Of Dark Love were poems that put him among "the strongest voices in contemporary Chicano poetry." De amor oscuro/Of Dark Love is an especially important collection because it attempts to "end the silence on Chicano male homosexuality." It is also considered the first collection of Mexican-American poetry "wholly dedicated to the emotion of love."

He also wrote some short stories.

== Awards ==
- 1981 Ruben Dario Prize for poetry.
- 1984 Chicano Literary Prize for poetry.
- 1993 American Book Award
- 1993 PEN Oakland Josephine Miles Award
- 1997 Pura Belpré Honor Award by the American Library Association
- 1998 Carlos Pellicer-Robert Frost Poetry Honor Award by the Third Binational Border Poetry Contest, Ciudad Juárez, Chihuahua.
- 2002 Pura Belpré Honor Award, Danforth and Fulbright fellowships
- 2002 Fred Cody Lifetime Achievement Award from the Bay Area Book Reviewers Association (BABRA)

== Works ==
- Tattoos, Oakland: Nomad Press, 1985
- Ya Vas, Carnal, San Francisco 1985
- Loma Prieta, Santa Cruz: We Press 1990
- Body in Flames/Cuerpo en llamas, San Francisco: Chronicle Books 1990
- De amor oscuro/Of Dark Love, Santa Cruz: Moving Parts Press 1991
- Cuerpo en llamas/Kropp i lågor, Lysekil, Sweden: Fabians Förlag 1991
- Cuerpo en llamas / Colainn ar bharr lasrach, Indreabhán, Ireland:Cló Iar-Connachta Teo 1992
- Poemas zurdos, Mexico City: Editorial Factor 1992
- Snake Poems: An Aztec Invocation. Chronicle Books. February 1, 1992. ISBN 978-0-8118-0161-4.
- De amor oscuro/Vin an ngrá dorcha, Indreabhán, Ireland: Cló Iar-Connachta Teo, 1992
- No Golden Gate for Us, Tesuque, New Mexico: Pennywhistle Press, 1993, ISBN 9780938631163
- Sonnets to Madness and Other Misfortunes / Sonetos a la locura y otras penas, Berkeley: Creative Arts Book Company, 2001, ISBN 9780887394508
- From the Other Side of Night / Del otro lado de la noche: New and Selected Poems. University of Arizona Press. 2002. ISBN 9780816522309.
- Iguanas in the Snow and Other Winter Poems/ Iguanas en la nieve y otros poemas de invierno. Illustrator Maya Christina Gonzalez. Perfection Learning Corporation. 2005. ISBN 978-0-7569-7093-2.
- Laughing Tomatoes and Other Spring Poems/Jitomates risueños y otros poemas de primavera. Illustrator Maya Christina Gonzalez. Bt Bound. 2005. ISBN 978-1-4176-6968-4.
- From the Bellybutton of the Moon And Other Summer Poems/Del ombligo de la luna y otros poemas de verano. Illustrator Maya Christina Gonzalez. Bt Bound. 2005. ISBN 978-1-4176-6969-1.
- Angels Ride Bikes And Other Fall Poems/Los ángeles andan en bicicleta y otros poemas de otoño. Illustrator Maya Christina Gonzalez. San Val, Incorporated. 2005. ISBN 978-1-4176-6970-7.
- Poems to Dream Together/Poemas para soñar juntos. Illustrator Paula Barragán. Lee & Low Books. 2005. ISBN 978-1-58430-233-9.
- Animal Poems of the Iguazú/Animalario del Iguazú. Illustrator Paula Barragán. Lee & Low Books. 2005. ISBN 978-1-58430-233-9.
- Ce Uno One: Poems for the New Sun / Poemas para el Nuevo Sol, Sacramento: Scythe Press 2010, ISBN 9781930454262
