= Zoeglossia =

Literary organization for poets with disabilities

- Founded: 2017
- Founder: Jennifer Bartlett, Sheila Black, and Connie Voisine
- Type: Nonprofit literary organization
- Purpose: Poetry; disability
- Location: New York, United States
- Website: www.zoeglossia.org

Zoeglossia is an American nonprofit literary organization for poets with disabilities. Founded in 2017, it runs a fellowship program, an annual retreat, readings, and a Poem of the Week series.

== History and programs ==
According to a Poetry Foundation grantee profile, Zoeglossia grew out of discussions in 2016 between Sheila Black and Kathi Wolfe about barriers faced by poets with disabilities. Black, Jennifer Bartlett, and Connie Voisine founded the organization in 2017. It began operating in 2019 as a fellowship program with an annual conference that included workshops and mentoring.

The National Endowment for the Arts wrote that Zoeglossia held its first retreat in 2019. Fellows serve five-year terms and may attend the annual retreat three times during that period. The organization also publishes Poem of the Week, a series curated by disabled poets. Wordgathering reviewed We Are Not Your Metaphor: A Disability Poetry Anthology, which presented work by fellows from the first Zoeglossia retreat.

Zoeglossia is a member of the Academy of American Poets' Poetry Coalition. In 2022, Ploughshares published a "Zoeglossia Introduction" by Bartlett and Black.

=== 2023 staff departures and internal review ===
In November 2023, Zoeglossia's board issued a statement about internal events involving staff members Saleem Hue Penny and Walela Nehanda. The statement said the board took allegations involving racism, transphobia, lack of transparency, and workplace conditions seriously; stated that Black had resigned as executive director; and said the organization would conduct an internal review. A February 2024 curatorial statement by Zoeglossia fellow Leslie McIntosh said three staff members had left in early November 2023 and that some fellows had called for a pause in programming and a restorative process.

== Funding ==
In 2022, Zoeglossia received a $10,000 grant from the National Endowment for the Arts to support its annual retreat. In 2023, it was one of the Poetry Fund grant recipients announced by the Academy of American Poets and Amazon Literary Partnership. In 2025, the Poetry Foundation awarded Zoeglossia $20,000 in general operating support. ProPublica's Nonprofit Explorer reported that Zoeglossia had $80,945 in revenue, $57,382 in expenses, and $145,270 in net assets for fiscal year 2024.
