= Francisco Aragón =

Latino-American poet

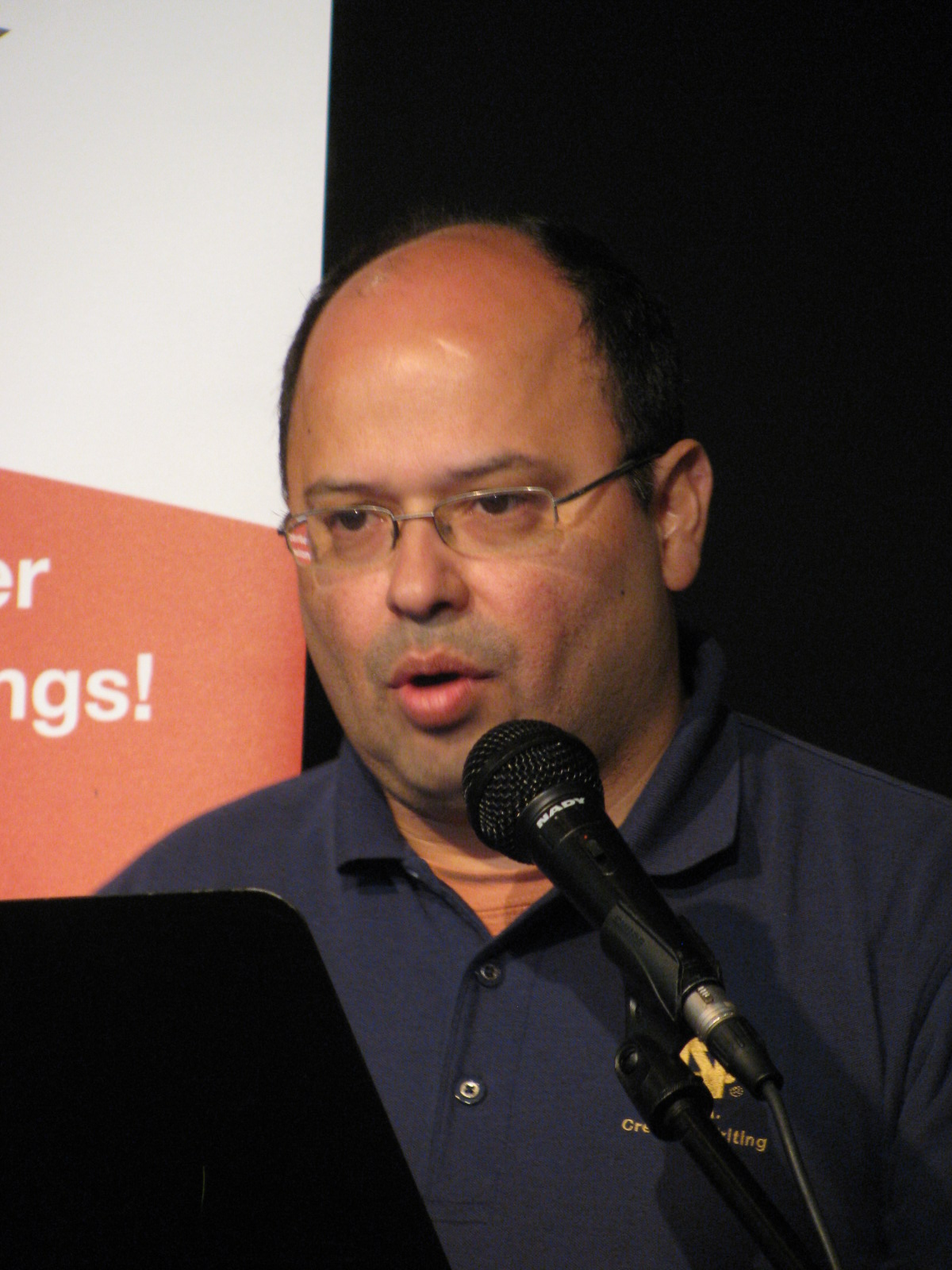
- Francisco Aragón, 2013
- Born: San Francisco, California
- Education: University of California, Davis; University of Notre Dame.
- Writing career
- Genre: Poetry
- Movement: Letras Latinas

Francisco Aragón is a Latino poet, editor and writer.

== Life ==
Born in San Francisco, California, Aragón's parents migrated from Nicaragua in the 1950s. is a graduate of Archbishop Riordan High School. He studied at the University of California, Berkeley and New York University. He earned an MA from the University of California, Davis and an MFA from the University of Notre Dame.

Aragón directs Letras Latinas, the literary program of the Institute for Latino Studies at the University of Notre Dame. He previously edited Momotombo Press. He served on the board of directors of the Association of Writers & Writing Programs.

== Publications ==
Aragón's books include Puerta del Sol (2005), and Glow of Our Sweat (2010). He edited the groundbreaking anthology The Wind Shifts: New Latino Poetry (2007).

His poetry and translations have appeared in the anthologies Inventions of Farewell: A Book of Elegies (2001) and Mariposa: A Modern Anthology of Queer Latino Poetry (2008), the journals Beltway Poetry Quarterly, Crab Orchard Review, Chelsea, The Journal, the online journals Jacket, Electronic Poetry Review, and Poetry Daily.

== Awards ==
Aragón is the winner of an Academy of American Poets College Prize and the 2010 Outstanding Latino/a Cultural Award in Literary Arts or Publications from the American Association of Hispanics in Higher Education. Aragón is a member of the prestigious Macondo Writers Workshop, the workshop founded by Sandra Cisneros. Aragón was also a founding fellow of the CantoMundo writing conference.
