= Robert Vasquez =

American poet

Robert Vasquez is a Chicano/Latino poet, writer and teacher.

== Career ==
Born to working-class parents, Vasquez was raised in California's Central Valley.

=== Education ===
He earned a Bachelor of Arts in English from California State University at Fresno and a Master of Fine Arts in English from the University of California, Irvine. He was a Wallace Stegner Fellow in Creative Writing for two years at Stanford University.

=== Awards ===
Vasquez's poetry has received various awards, including three Academy of American Poets prizes, three National Society of Arts and Letters awards, and a National Writers Union award.

In 2004 he was the inaugural judge for the Andrés Montoya Poetry Prize.

=== Teaching ===
He has taught at Western Michigan University and University of California, Davis and University of California, Santa Cruz. He currently teaches at College of the Sequoias in Visalia, CA. In his creative writing courses, he focuses on Freudian theory in student writing.

== Publications ==
=== Books ===
He is the author of At the Rainbow (University of New Mexico Press) winner of the James Duval Phelan Award and the chapbook, Braille for the Heart, (Momotombo Press, 2007).

=== Journals ===
Vasquez's poetry has been published in various journals including The Los Angeles Times Book Review, The Missouri Review, The New England Review, The Notre Dame Review, Parnassas: Poetry in Review, Ploughshares, VerseDaily.com, and The Village Voice.

=== Anthologies ===
After Aztlan: Latino Poets of the Nineties edited by Ray Gonzalez, American Religious Poetry: An Anthology Edited by Harold Bloom, The Atomic Bomb, Atomic Ghost: Poets Respond to the Nuclear Age, California the Beautiful, The Geography of Home, Highway 99, How Much Earth, Literary Nevada: Writings from the Silver State, Piecework: 19 Fresno Poets, Proud Harvest, Under the Fifth Sun: Latino Literature from California, and Writing Home: Award-Winning Literature from the New West.
