= Valerie Martínez =

Marine and Blue Economy

Dr. Mobereola Anthony Ekundayo
- Born: August 26, 1959 (age 67); Ibadan, Oyo State, Nigeria
- Occupation: Civil Servant
- Years active: 2024-Present
- Employer(s): Nigerian Maritime Administration and Safety Agency (NIMASA)
- Predecessor: Mr. Bashir Jamoh
- Website: https://nimasa.gov.ng/

Dr. Mobereola Anthony Ekundayo (Born,1959) is the Director-General and Chief Executive Officer of the Nigerian Maritime Administration and Safety Agency (NIMASA). He Holds a Ph.D. and an M.Sc. in Transport Economics from the University of Wales, United Kingdom. Appointed by President Bola Ahmed Tinubu on March 11, 2024, for a renewable four-year term, succeeding Mr. Bashir Jamoh. Lagos State Commissioner for Transportation (2015–2016): Managed state-level transport policies. LAMATA (2003–2015): Served as the Managing Director of the Lagos Metropolitan Area Transport Authority. Private Sector: Worked as Deputy Managing Director and Project Development Director at AFM Consulting Plc in London, and as a Senior Economist at British Petroleum Shipping Limited in London. If you'd like, let me know if you want to explore:Specific policies or reforms introduced under his tenure the broader mandate of NIMASA in Nigeria's blue economy.

Valerie Martinez was born and raised in Santa Fe, New Mexico, and descends from 16th century Spanish colonizers as well as indigenous ancestors of the Southwest U.S. She left New Mexico in 1979 to attend Vassar College, where she received her A.B. in English/American literature in 1983. She received her M.F.A. in creative writing/poetry in 1989 from the University of Arizona.

Before returning to New Mexico to settle permanently in 2003, Martinez traveled widely in the U.S. and Europe as well as Mexico, Israel, Japan, Zimbabwe, Botswana and South Africa. For three years (1993–1995), she resided in Swaziland, where she taught English in elementary and middle schools. Since 2003 she has traveled to Peru, Germany, Belgium, Russia, South Africa, Zimbabwe, Botswana, Namibia, Wales, Venice, Norway and Iceland. Her travels have had a significant impact on her creative and community arts work.

Martinez taught for over 23 years as a college/university professor with emphases in Poetry, American Literature, Women's Literature, Native American Literature and Latino/a Literature. From 2018 to 2021 she was the Director of History and Literary Arts at the National Hispanic Cultural Center.

Since 2008, Martinez has worked in the field of arts and community development, first as a member of the Core Artist Team and executive director of Littleglobe, Inc, and subsequently as Founding Director of Artful Life. In 2021, Artful Life was chosen as the lead consultant for the Santa Fe, New Mexico CHART (Culture, History, Art, Reconciliation, and Truth) project, leading the city and county of Santa Fe through a twelve-month community engagement process focused on truth, healing, and reconciliation after protests and controversy around monuments and statues. Leading a 15-member project team, the project produced a final report in August 2022.

== Poetry ==
Martinez is the author of six books of poetry, two chapbooks, and one book of translations.

Her book-length poem, Count', was published by the University of Arizona Press in August 2021. Count is a hybrid work that reckons with the reality of climate change. The poem unfolds over 43 sections of myth-gathering, endangered flora and fauna, accounts of climate devastation, storytelling, witnessing, references to works of eco-art, and evocations of children. Central to the poem is the idea of counting, as in countdown to the extinction of species, enumeration of the wonders of the natural world, and counting our way back to the balance that is required to save ourselves from climate destruction. The poem is the subject of a world-premiere vocal work, "As the Waters Began to Rise", by composer Peter Gilbert which premiered in April of 2022, performed by Ekmeles.

Each and Her (winner of the 2011 Arizona Book Award) was nominated for a Pulitzer Prize, the William Carlos William Award, the National Book Critics Circle award, the PEN Open Book Award, the Ron Ridenhour Prize (among other honors), and was an honorable mention in the 2011 International Latino Book Awards. Each and Her is a book-length, collage poem which addresses the murders of women in Juarez, Mexico, as well as the phenomenon of femicide. It continues to receive wide acclaim and is taught in Latino Literature, Women's Literature, and other literature classes nationwide.

Martinez's first book of poetry, Absence, Luminescent (Four Way Books 1999), won the Larry Levis Prize and a Greenwall Grant from the Academy of American Poets after being a finalist in the Walt Whitman, National Poetry Series, and Intro Award competitions. Prize judge Jean Valentine praised the book thus: "Valerie Martinez has written an extraordinary book; these poems are expansive, surprising, intelligent; her subjects are as alive as her language. Her willingness to take risks is uncommon, and so is her compassion." A second edition of the book was published in 2010.

Martinez's second book, World to World, was published by the University of Arizona Press in 2004, and her translations of the poetry of Uruguay's Delmira Agustini (1886–1914), A Flock of Scarlet Doves, was published in special edition by Sutton Hoo Press in 2005. A collection of poems about Santa Fe, New Mexico (written during her tenure as Poet Laureate of Santa Fe), And They Called it Horizon, was published by Sunstone Press in 2010.

Martinez's chapbook-length hybrid work (poetry and prose), "A Hundred Little Mouths", premiered in November 2015 with Susan Silton's "Whistling Project" at SITE Santa Fe. Her long poem, "This is How it Began", a creation story about the city of Santa Fe, New Mexico, was published by the Press of the Palace of the Governors in 2010, at the end of her tenure as Santa Fe Poet Laureate.

Martinez's poetry, translations, and essays have appeared widely in literary journals and magazines including Poetry, The American Poetry Review, Parnassus, The Colorado Review, Puerto del Sol, The Notre Dame Review, Mandorla, Tiferet, The Bloomsbury Review, and AGNI. Her work appears in many anthologies of contemporary poetry, including The Best American Poetry; New American Poets--A Breadloaf Anthology; American Poetry--Next Generation, Touching the Fire--Fifteen Poets of Today's Latino Renaissance and Renaming Ecstasy--Latino Writings on the Sacred. Martínez also served as assistant editor of the anthology Reinventing the Enemy's Language--Contemporary Writing by Native Women of North America (Norton 1997) and an essay about Joy Harjo (along with poems by Harjo and Martínez) appears in the anthology Women Poets on Mentorship: Efforts and Affections (University of Iowa Press, 2008). Valerie's poem "September, 2001” was featured in the Washington Post's "Poet's Choice" Series (September 2009). An animated version of Valerie's poem, "Bowl," appears in the Poetry Everywhere Series (PBS/The Poetry Foundation) and has been put to music by composer Glen Rover and sung by soprano Talise Trevigne on her acclaimed CD, At the Statue of Venus (GPR Records).

== College/university teaching ==
Martinez taught for over 23 years as a college/university professor with emphases in Poetry, American Literature, Women's Literature, Native American Literature and Latino/a Literature. She taught at the University of Arizona, Ursinus College, New Mexico Highlands University, University of New Mexico, College of Santa Fe, University of Miami, and the Institute for American Indian Arts (IAIA). At the College of Santa Fe she finished her academic career as a tenured faculty member in 2009 and worked as the Director of Interdisciplinary Studies, creating cross-disciplinary programs in Southwest Studies and Humanities. Her academic work includes dozens of literary papers, workshops and conference panels.

== Community arts ==
While in academia, Martinez also directed a wide range of community outreach programs engaging communities with poetry. She left academia in 2009 to focus on arts and community engagement work.

Martinez was the Founding Director of Artful Life (2015–2024) whose arts engagement projects were designed to transform communities through the beauty and power of collaborative art. From 2006 to 2014 Valerie was executive director and Core Artist with Littleglobe, a New Mexico-based 501(c)(3) that creates significant works of art/performance with members of diverse and under-served communities. Valerie's large-scale arts and community development projects include TIASO (an artist-serving cooperative that will launch in 2016); El Puente/The Bridge; Stories of Route 66: The International District; Women and Creativity; EKCO; Rivers Run Through Us; Lines and Circles; Common Ground TOC; Lifesongs, and Memorylines: Voces de Nuestras Jornadas.

In 2021, Artful Life was chosen as the lead consultant for the Santa Fe, New Mexico CHART (Culture, History, Art, Reconciliation, and Truth) project, leading the city and county of Santa Fe through a twelve-month community engagement process focused on truth, healing, and reconciliation.

== Collaborations ==
Martinez is also a collaborative artist who works with other writers, visual artists, dancers, singers, composers and actors in a wide range of creative projects, including Susan Silton's Whistling Project, and the world premiere of "As the Waters Began to Rise", by composer Peter Gilbert, performed by Ekmeles. She is the Founder of the EKCO Poets which has been creating spoken word performance pieces since 2009. Learn more

== Published works ==
Full-length poetry collections

- Count. University of Arizona Press. 2021. ISBN 978-0-81654-219-2.
- And They Called It Horizon. Sunstone Press. 2010. ISBN 978-0-86534-790-8.
- Each and Her. University of Arizona Press. 2010. ISBN 978-0-8165-2859-2.
- World to World. University of Arizona Press. 2004. ISBN 978-0-8165-2375-7.
- Absence, Luminescent, Four Way Books, 1999, ISBN 9781884800238

Chapbooks

- "A Hundred Little Mouths." 2015. ISBN 978-0-9703640-5-0. Published on the occasion of the performance, "Susan Silton and the Crowing Hens," November 7, 2015, SITE Santa Fe, Santa Fe, New Mexico as part of the exhibition, SITE 20 Years/20 Shows, 2015.
- "This Is How it Began." The Press at the Palace of the Governors. 2010. Published on the occasion of Martinez's tenure as Santa Fe Poet Laureate (2008–2010).

Translations

- A Flock of Scarlet Doves (Sutton Hoo Press, 2005) OCLC 60797046

Anthologies (editor)

- Open-Hearted Horizon: Poems of Albuquerque (University of New Mexico Press, forthcoming February 2024)
- Lines and Circles: A Celebration of Santa Fe Families (Sunstone Press, 2010)
- Ask Me Who I Am: Writing and Art by foster care youth in programs of the New Mexico Children, Youth and Families Department (Littleglobe Productions, 2010)
- Reinventing the Enemy's Language--Contemporary Writing by Native Women of North America (Norton, 1997)

Anthologies - Selected (poems, essays)

- New Mexico Poetry Anthology. Poem: "And They Called It Horizon." Edited by Levi Romero and Michelle Otero. Museum of New Mexico Press, 2023.
- How to Read (and Write About) Poetry. Poem, "Granite Weaving" (based on Jesus Moroles's granite sculpture by the same name). The poem originally appeared in Poetry magazine, March 2016 issue. Edited by Susan Holbrook. Broadview Press 2022, second edition.
- Latinx Poetics: Essays on the Art of Poetry. Essay: "Peopleness: Ethnicity and the Latinx Poem." Edited by Ruben Quesada. University of New Mexico Press, 2022.
- Counterclaims: Poets and Poetries, Talking Back. Many of the most influential voices in contemporary poetics respond to well-known statements about poetry by W.H. Auden and Theodor Adornos, including Valerie Martínez, Susan Wheeler, Cynthia Hogue, Mary Ruefle and C.D. Wright. Edited by H.L Hix, Dalkey Archive Press, 2020.
- Resist Much, Obey Little: Inaugural Poems to the Resistance. Poems "Where Resistance Shapes Itself," "Six Principles of Nonviolence" and "Life, Liberty, Property." Edited by Boughn, Bradley, Cardenas, et al. Spuyten Duyvil Press/Dispatches Editions, February 28, 2017.
- Ley Lines (writers and artists in conversation). Edited by H.L. Hix. Commentary on passages in Each and Her. Wilfried Laurier University Press, 2014.
- Wingbeats II: Exercises & Practice in Poetry. "Dip, Rise, Dive: Personal Questions and the Leap Into Poetry." A generative exercise for writers, teachers and courses. Eds. Wiggerman and Meischen. Dos Gatos Press, 2014.
- Synergy: La Onda de la Palabra/Wave of the Word: Visual Art, Writing, and Community-Making. Poem "Lines" and Art "Untitled:" The anthology documents a two-year project (funded by the National Endowment for the Arts) in which poets worked together with artists experiencing homelessness or housing instability in collaboration with ArtStreet, a program of Albuquerque Health Care for the Homeless. Old School Books, 2012.
- Santa Fe: Exploring the Past, Defining the Future. Edited by Rob Dean. Excerpt from "Listen" (poem). Sunstone Press 2011.
- El Palacio: Art, History and Culture of the Southwest: Interview of Valerie Martínez by Carmella Padilla. El Palacio Press, August 2010.
- Efforts and Affections: Contemporary Poets and Their Mentors: essay "Mapping the Next World" (about Joy Harjo) and poems by Martínez and Harjo. Eds. Rachel Zucker and Arielle Greenberg. University of Iowa Press, 2008.
- Metamorfosis: Voces femininas, palabras español. Poem: "El mundo al mundo." Instituto Cervantes con el Centro Nacional de la Cultura Hispana. March, 2008.
- Renaming Ecstasy: Latino Writings on the Sacred: poems: "The Annunciation," "Tesoro," "Invocation," "O Story of Influence," "Heat of Breath." Bilingual Press, December 2002.
- New American Poetry: A Bread Loaf Anthology. "Camera Obscura" and "Ever So, Between." University of New England Press, 2000.
- American Poetry: Next Generation. "Coastal" and "Into the Next One." Carnegie Mellon Press, 2000.
- Touching the Fire: Fifteen Poets of Today's Latino Renaissance. Ten poems. New York: Doubleday, 1998.
- The Best American Poetry. "Into the Next One." New York: Scribner, 1996.

== Honors and awards ==
- 2014 Creative Bravos Award celebrating the works and accomplishments of Albuquerque-based artists/writers and arts organizations, City of Albuquerque, New Mexico
- 2011 Finalist, International Latino Book Awards, for Each and Her
- 2020 Arizona Book Award for Each and Her
- 2009 Twenty Women Who Have Made a Difference, Albuquerque Journal Sage Magazine
- 2008–2010 Poet Laureate of Santa Fe, New Mexico
- 1999 Larry Levis Poetry Prize for Absence, Luminescent. Judge: Jean Valentine
- 1998 The Greenwall Fund Grant, Academy of American Poets, for Absence, Luminescent

== Sources ==
- Library of Congress Online Catalog > Valerie Martínez
