= University of Notre Dame Press =

Publisher in Indiana, United States

- Parent company: University of Notre Dame
- Founded: 1949
- Country of origin: United States
- Headquarters location: Notre Dame, Indiana
- Distribution: Longleaf Services (United States); UTP Distribution (Canada); Combined Academic Publishers (EMEA/APAC)
- Publication types: Books
- Official website: undpress.nd.edu

The University of Notre Dame Press is a university press that is part of the University of Notre Dame in Notre Dame, Indiana, United States. The press was founded in 1949, and claims to be the largest Catholic university press in the world.

The University of Notre Dame Press is currently a member of the Association of University Presses, to which it was admitted in 1959. Domestic distribution for the press is currently provided by the University of North Carolina Press's Longleaf Services.

== See also ==
- List of English-language book publishing companies
- List of university presses
