= Carlo Matos =

Portuguese-American writer

Carlo Matos is a Portuguese-American writer who currently lives in Chicago.

== Career ==
Matos has published twelve full-length books and two chapbooks. His debut novel, As Malcriadas or Names We Inherit was released by New Meridian Arts in 2022. He has also published 6 poetry books (A School for Fishermen, Counting Sheep till Doomsday, Big Bad Asterisk*, It's Best not to Interrupt Her Experiments, We Prefer the Damned, and Book of Tongues: The Dead Letters of Pedro & Inês.) He has published a collection of creative nonfiction essays titled, The Quitters and a scholarly book on the theater of London's West End titled, Ibsen's Foreign Contagion: Henrik Ibsen, Arthur Wing Pinero & Modernism on the London Stage, 1890-1900. Other works include his novella The Secret Correspondence of Loon & Fiasco and an anthology of Portuguese-American and Portuguese-Canadian writing he edited with Luis Gonçalves, titled, Writers of the Portuguese Diaspora in the United States and Canada.

Matos's work has appeared in many journals, including PANK, Spoon River Poetry Review, Hobart, Another Chicago Magazine, Diagram, Boston Review, Iowa Review, Tupelo Quarterly, Modern Drama, Your Impossible Voice, Rhino, Black Ocean, Menacing Hedge, Filamentos, Gávea-Brown: A Bilingual Journal, and The Explicator, among many others. His work has been nominated for several Pushcart Prizes and Best of the Net Awards, and has also been entered into consideration for the Pulitzer Prize, the National Book Award, the National Book Critics Circle Award, the Lambda Literary Award and the Bisexual Book Awards.

Artist residencies include Disquiet ILP in Portugal, La Romita School of Art in Italy, La MaMa ETC's International Playwright Retreat in Italy, Centrum, Ragdale, Sundress Academy for the Arts, and Wellspring House.

He received degrees in English and theater from the University of Massachusetts, Amherst and holds a Ph.D. in literature from UMass Amherst's graduate English program.

Matos is a full professor at Harry S Truman College, one of the City Colleges of Chicago, where he teaches composition, literature, and creative writing. He is also the editor of Truman College's literary journal, City Brink. He has received literary fellowships from CantoMundo, the Illinois Arts Council, Disquiet International Literary Program, the Sundress Academy for the Arts, and the La Romita School of Art.

Matos is a former MMA fighter, kickboxer, and striking coach for Team 110.

== Reading series ==
Matos is a founding member of Kale Soup for the Soul. In 2012, Millicent Borges Accardi started the Kale Soup for the Soul reading series featuring Portuguese-American writers. Matos became involved with the group when the first event occurred at Chicago's famous Cultural Center. Since then, Kale Soup for the Soul readings have featured over 25 different writers in regional readings in cities such as Albuquerque, San Francisco, Seattle, Iowa City, Providence, Boston and San José—as part of a new wave of Portuguese-American Literature. In 2013, there were Kale Soup for the Soul readings at the Mass Poetry Festival in Salem, the Valente Library in Cambridge, and the Portuguese Consulate in Boston. There were also readings at Brown University, UMass Dartmouth, University of Toronto, York University, and Rhode Island College as well as workshops with local students from Shea High School in Rhode Island. There was also a conference in Lisbon which featured a panel about Portuguese-American Literature as well as a round table with many of the writers who have participated in Kale Soup for the Soul over the years.

== Works ==
=== Poetry collections ===
- Book of Tongues: The Dead Letters of Pedro & Inês (FlowerSong Press, 2025, ISBN 9781963245134)
- We Prefer the Damned (Unbound Edition Press, 2021, ISBN 9780991378029)
- It's Best Not to Interrupt Her Experiments (Negative Capability Press, 2016, ISBN 978-0942544329)
- Big Bad Asterisk* (BlazeVOX [books], 2013, ISBN 978-1-60964-119-1)
- Counting Sheep till Doomsday (BlazeVOX [books], 2011, ISBN 978-1609640835)
- A School for Fishermen (BrickHouse Books, 2010, ISBN 978-0932616982)

=== Novels ===
- In the Alien Field (Bruma Publications, forthcoming)
- As Malcriadas or Names We Inherit (New Meridian Arts, 2022)
- The Secret Correspondence of Loon & Fiasco (Mayapple Press, 2014)

=== Scholarly work ===
- Ibsen's Foreign Contagion: Henrik Ibsen, Arthur Wing Pinero & Modernism on the London Stage, 1890-1900 (Academica Press, 2012)

=== Creative non-fiction ===
- The Quitters (Tortoise Books, 2017)

=== Anthologies edited ===
- Writers of the Portuguese Diaspora in the United States & Canada (Boavista Press, 2015)

=== Chapbooks ===
- Most Human Human Contest (Slash Pine Press, 2015)

== Interviews ==
- by Vamberto Freitas at Filamentos and Gávea-Brown: A Bilingual Anthology
- by Patrick Davise & Peter Campion at Authors Unbound Podcast
- by Simone Muench & Jackie K. White at Spoon River Poetry Review
- by Kristina Marie Darling at American Microreviews and Interviews
- by Millicent Borges Accardi at Poets' Quarterly
- by Millicent Borges Accardi at Poets' Quarterly (second interview)
- by Michael Colson at Portuguese American Journal
