= Deborah Paredez =

American poet

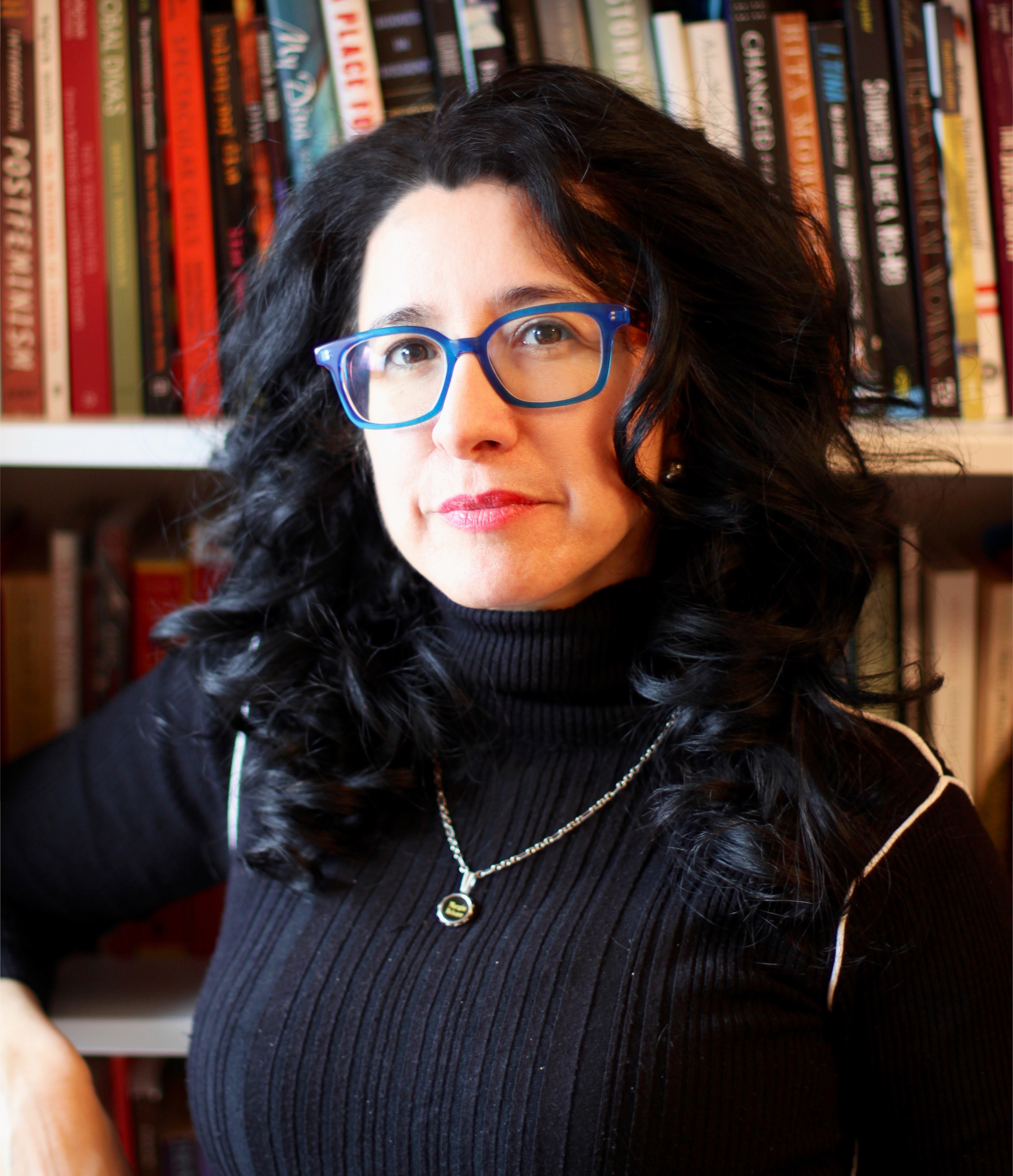
- Born: 1970 (age 55–56); San Antonio, Texas
- Citizenship: American
- Education: BA, Trinity University; PhD, Northwestern University
- Occupations: Professor, poet
- Spouse: Frank Andre Guridy
- Writing career
- Language: English, Spanish
- Genres: Poetry, Essays

Deborah Paredez (born December 19, 1970) is an American poet, scholar, and cultural critic. She is the author of the critical memoir American Diva, the poetry collections Year of the Dog and This Side of Skin, and the scholarly study Selenidad: Selena, Latinos, and the Performance of Memory. She is co-founder (and served as co-director, 2009–2019, 2021–2023) of CantoMundo, a national organization that supports Latinx poets and poetry. She lives in New York City where she is a professor of creative writing and ethnic studies at Columbia University.

== Personal life ==
Paredez was born and raised in San Antonio, Texas. She has lived and worked in Seattle, Chicago, Crested Butte, Oaxaca City, Austin, Paris, and New York City. She is married to the historian Frank Andre Guridy.

== Professional life ==
Paredez earned a BA in English Literature from Trinity University in 1993 and a doctorate from the Interdisciplinary Ph.D. in Theatre and Drama (IPTD) program at Northwestern University in 2002. She has taught at Vassar College (2000–2003), University of Texas at Austin (2003–2016), Université Sorbonne nouvelle (2014), and Columbia University (2015–present). Along with Norma Elia Cantú, Pablo Martinez, Celeste Mendoza, and Carmen Tafolla, Paredez co-founded CantoMundo in 2009. She writes essays about American performance, Latinx culture, and divas. Her poetry is influenced by contemporary American poets including Natasha Trethewey, Sharon Olds, and A.E. Stallings. She is the Chair of the Writing Program in the School of the Arts at Columbia University.

== Published work ==
Her poetry collection, Year of the Dog (BOA Editions 2020), won the 2020 Writers' League of Texas Poetry Book Award, was listed as a "New and Notable Poetry Book" by The New York Times and described as "candid and chilling" by Ms. Magazine. Her poetry collection, This Side of Skin, was published by Wings Press in 2002. Her scholarly book, Selenidad: Selena, Latinos, and the Performance of Memory, was published by Duke University Press in 2009 and was the recipient of the National Association of Chicana/o Studies Book Award-Honorable Mention and the Latino Studies Book Award-Honorable Mention.

Her essays and poems have appeared in a range of places including Poetry, The New York Times, Los Angeles Review of Books, Poet Lore, Boston Review, Callaloo, and Theatre Journal. Her work has also been anthologized in The Gulf Stream: Poems of the Gulf Coast (Snake Nation Press 2014), Beyond El Barrio: Everyday Life in Latina/o America (NYU Press 2010), Women and Migration in the US-Mexico Borderlands (Duke University Press 2007), The Wind Shifts: New Latino Poetry (University of Arizona University Press 2007), Floricanto Sí! A Collection of Latina Poetry (Penguin 1998), and Daughters of the Fifth Sun: A Collection of Latina Fiction and Poetry (Riverhead 1995).

== Bibliography ==
- Paredez, D. (2002). This Side of Skin. Wings. ISBN 978-0-930324-68-1.
- Paredez, Deborah (2009). Selenidad: Selena, Latinos, and the Performance of Memory. doi:10.1215/9780822390893. ISBN 978-0-8223-4489-6.
- Paredez, D. (2020). Year of the Dog. BOA. ISBN 978-1-950774-01-2.
