= Becoming Naomi León =

2004 novel by Pam Muñoz Ryan

- First edition
- Author: Pam Muñoz Ryan
- Language: English
- Genre: Children's novel
- Publisher: Scholastic Press
- Publication date: September 1, 2004
- Publication place: United States
- Media type: Print (hardcover & paperback)
- Pages: 246 pages
- ISBN: 0-439-26969-5

Becoming Naomi León is a 2004 coming of age novel by Pam Muñoz Ryan about a quiet Latina girl, whose life with her great-grandmother and younger brother is peaceful, until her mother reappears after abandoning her and her brother years earlier.

== Plot summary ==
Naomi Soledad León Outlaw is a Hispanic girl who lives a relatively peaceful life with her great-grandmother, Mary Outlaw, and younger brother, Owen, in the fictional town of Lemon Tree, California. One day, Naomi and Owen's mother, Skyla, suddenly reappears after seven years of being gone. Although initially happy to have her mother back in her life, Naomi questions the reason for Skyla's return, whilst Skyla showers Naomi with gifts, but neglects and expresses disgust towards Owen.

Mary later tells Naomi and Owen the truth on the day of the Parent-Teacher Conferences that Skyla promised to attend, but didn't: Skyla is an alcoholic who has been in and out of rehabilitation centers. Naomi and Owen's father had wanted custody of them but Skyla, refusing to allow it, abandoned the children with Mary to prevent this from happening. Eventually, Skyla becomes abusive and controlling towards her children, gradually frightening Naomi, but due to her difficulty in speaking up for herself, she is hesitant to tell Mary.

However, after a seemingly regular doctor's appointment for Owen, Skyla finally snaps, revealing that the reason she reentered Naomi and Owen's lives was so she could take Naomi with her and her boyfriend, Clive, to Las Vegas so that she would take care of Clive's daughter as a free babysitter while leaving Owen behind. However, refusing to let that happen, Mary takes the kids on a whirlwind journey accompanied by their neighbors Fabiola and Bernardo Morales to the city of Oaxaca, Mexico. Once there, they go on a quest in which Naomi is determined to find her father, Santiago. The group participates in Mexico's Los Posadas and Night of the Radishes, where Santiago arrives and reunites with his children, but he is unable to come back with Naomi and Owen to Lemon Tree.

However, with Santiago's support and Naomi's testimony against Skyla, Mary successfully manages to gain full guardianship of Naomi and Owen and the trio return to their peaceful life in Lemon Tree.

== Main characters ==
Naomi Soledad León Outlaw: the daughter of Santiago and Skyla, the great-granddaughter of Mary, and the sister of Owen; she is also the main protagonist and narrator of the story. Naomi is a quiet and shy but very naive Hispanic girl who has difficulty speaking up for herself and her younger brother Owen, and has lived with her brother and great-grandmother for most of her life. She is talented at soap carving and (as she puts it) "worrying and making lists" and also considers herself as "nobody special".

Owen Soledad León Outlaw: the son of Santiago and Skyla, the great-grandson of Mary, and the brother of Naomi. He is severely deformed, but is more cheerful and outgoing than Naomi, and enjoys wearing tape.

Mary Outlaw: Also known as "Gram", Mary is the great-grandmother and guardian of Naomi and Owen and the grandmother of Skyla. Wise and loving, she worries constantly for Naomi and Owen and loves them dearly, willing to do anything to protect them and ensure their happiness, even from her granddaughter.

Bernardo and Fabiola Morales: the neighbors of the Outlaws who hail from Mexico, with Bernardo being the one who taught Naomi how to carve. Like Mary, they deeply care for and are protective of Naomi and Owen and wish for them to live happy and fulfilling lives.

Skyla Jones: the mother of Naomi and Owen, the ex-wife of Santiago, and the main antagonist in the story who suddenly reappeared in her children's lives after seven years of being gone. An alcoholic, Skyla is mentally unstable; she verbally and physically abuses Naomi and Owen, despite expressing favoritism towards Naomi because of Owen's deformities.

Santiago León: the father of Naomi and Owen and the ex-husband of Skyla. Although absent for the majority of his children's lives, Santiago is a loving and patient man who cares for his children dearly despite their separation. He also is skilled at carving, of which his daughter inherited.

== Reception ==
Kirkus Reviews wrote "Ryan’s sure-handed storytelling and affection for her characters convey a clear sense of Naomi’s triumph, as she becomes “who I was meant to be.”" and Publishers Weekly wrote "Once again, Ryan (Esperanza Rising) crystallizes the essence of settings and characters through potent, economic prose." Common Sense Media found "Skyla a rather cardboard villain, and lessens the complexity of the situation. But the author makes up for this with the richness of the scenes in Mexico, which spring to vivid life."

=== Awards ===
- The 2005 Tomás Rivera Book Award
- The 2005 Schneider Family Book Award for Middle School book
- The 2006 Pura Belpré Honor for Author
