= Children's Book Award =

Children's Book Award is a generic term that has been applied to:

- Caldecott Medal, annual "most distinguished American picture book for children"
- Children's Book Award (UK), from the Federation of Children's Book Groups
- Dorothy Canfield Fisher Children's Book Award from the Vermont Department of Libraries
- Guardian Children's Fiction Prize
- Golden Kite Award awarded by the Society of Children's Book Writers and Illustrators, since 2018, in six categories
- Jane Addams Children's Book Award
- Josette Frank Award, given by the Children's Book Committee at Bank Street College of Education, formerly known as the "Children's Book Award"
- Newbery Medal, awarded by the Association for Library Service to Children, of the American Library Association, was the first "children's book award"
- New Zealand Book Awards for Children and Young Adults, formerly "New Zealand Post Children’s Book Awards"
- Red House Children's Book Award, former name of FCBG Children's Book Award
- Tomas Rivera Mexican American Children's Book Award

== See also ==
- Category:Children's literary awards
