= Amescua =

Amescua is a Spanish surname ultimately of Basque origin. Notable people with the surname include:

- Antonio Mira de Amescua, (1578? – 1636?) Spanish dramatist
- Gloria Amescua, Latina/Tejana writer
