= CantoMundo =

American literary organization

CantoMundo is an American literary organization founded in 2009 to support Latino poets and poetry. It hosts an annual poetry workshop dedicated to the creation, documentation, and critical analysis of Latinx poetry.

== History ==
CantoMundo was founded in 2009 in San Antonio, Texas when Norma Elia Cantú, Celeste Guzman Mendoza, Pablo Miguel Martínez, Deborah Paredez, and Carmen Tafolla, inspired by the Cave Canem workshops for African-American poets, organized a workshop for Latino writers. The first workshop was held at the National Hispanic Cultural Center in Albuquerque, New Mexico in 2010. From 2011 to 2016 the workshops were held at the University of Texas, Austin. From 2017 to 2019 Columbia University, in New York City served as home for the program and workshops. In August 2019, the University of Arizona Poetry Center formally announced a three-year partnership to host the CantoMundo workshops in Tucson, Arizona beginning in 2020.

CantoMundo is one of over 25 members of the Poetry Coalition, an alliance of nonprofit organizations that aim to promote poetry that is coordinated by the Academy of American Poets. In January 2019, the Academy of American Poets allocated a portion of a $2.2 million endowment from the Andrew W. Mellon Foundation to the Poetry Coalition, some of which went to CantoMundo.

== Writing conference ==
During the four day writing conference, fellows are divided into two groups of 12-15 poets that engage in workshops with invited faculty members, attend keynote lectures, and participate in panel discussions.

During the weekend, fellows also have the opportunity to share their work in front of an audience at the Friday and Saturday night readings which are free and open to the general public. Readings are sponsored by Columbia University's Center for the Study of Race and Ethnicity and the Department of Women’s, Gender, and Sexuality Studies at Barnard College, and the Office of the Dean of Social Science in the Faculty of Arts and Sciences.

== Workshop faculty ==
- 2010: Martín Espada and Demetria Martínez. Keynote by Toi Derricotte
- 2011: Naomi Ayala and Benjamin Alire Sáenz. Keynote by Vikas Menon
- 2012: Aracelis Girmay & Roberto Tejada. Keynote by E. Ethelbert Miller
- 2013: Valerie Martinez & Willie Perdomo. Keynote by Natalie Handal
- 2014: Rafael Campo & Lorna Dee Cervantes. Keynote by Sherwin Bitsui
- 2015: Sandra María Esteves. Keynote by Tim'm West
- 2016: Juan Felipe Herrera & Carmen Tafolla. Keynote by Natasha Trethewey
- 2017: Rosa Alcalá & Rigoberto González.
- 2018: Daniel Borzutzky & Ada Limon. Keynote by Douglas Kearney
- 2019: Monica De La Torre & Natalie Diaz. Keynote by Patricia Smith
- 2020: Brenda Cárdenas & Urayoan Noel.

== Current fellows (partial list) ==
- Amy M. Alvarez
- Aldo Amparán
- Diannely Antigua
- John Manuel Arias
- Mario Alejandro Ariza
- Oliver Baez Bendorf
- Amy Sayre Baptista
- Andrea Blancas Beltran
- Sara Borjas
- M. Soledad Caballero
- David Campos
- Andrés Cerpa
- MK Chavez
- Karla Cordero
- Cristina Correa
- Carina del Valle Schorske
- Carolina Ebeid
- Joshua Escobar
- Lauren Espinoza
- Eduardo Gabrieloff
- Suzi F. Garcia
- Ysabel Y. Gonzalez
- Marcelo Hernandez Castillo
- Paul Hlava Ceballos
- Jen Hofer
- Ricardo Maldonado
- Sheila Maldonado
- Carlo Matos
- Jennifer Maritza McCauley
- Jasminne Mendez
- Florencia Milito
- Michelle Moncayo
- Lara Mimosa Montes
- Brenda Nettles Riojas
- Christina Olivares
- José Guadalupe Olivarez
- Maryam Ivette Parhizkar
- Emily Perez
- Zenaida Peterson
- Noel Quiñones
- Gabriel Ramirez
- Reyes Ramirez
- Julian Randall
- Alexandra Lytton Regalado
- Monica Rico
- Joseph Rios
- Raquel Salas Rivera
- Leslie Sainz
- Ruth Irupé Sanabria
- Cintia Santana
- Roberto Santiago
- Nicole Sealey
- Yvette Siegert
- María Fernanda
- Analicia Sotelo
- Michael Torres
- Emma Trelles
- Norma Liliana Valdez
- Dan Vera
- Rich Villar
- Vanessa Angélica Villarreal
- Felicia Zamora

== Former fellows (partial list) ==
- Millicent Borges Accardi
- Elizabeth Acevedo
- Gloria Amescua
- Francisco Aragón
- José Angel Araguz
- Diego Báez
- Rosebud Ben-Oni
- Norma Elia Cantú
- Marcelo Hernandez Castillo
- Eduardo C. Corral
- Anthony Cody
- Cynthia Cruz
- Barbara Brinson Curiel
- Diana Marie Delgado
- Michael Luis Dauro
- Denice Frohman
- Ángel García
- Carmen Gimenez Smith
- Laurie Ann Guerrero
- Celeste Guzman Mendoza
- Juan Luis Guzmán
- Leticia Hernandez-Linares
- Ire'ne Lara Silva
- Raina León
- Manuel Paul López
- Sheryl Luna
- Carl Marcum
- Pablo Miguel Martínez
- Florencia Milito
- Juan Morales
- PaulA Neves
- Urayoan Noel
- Amalia Ortiz
- Deborah Paredez
- Emmy Pérez
- Ruben Quesada
- Natalie Scenters-Zapico
- Carmen Tafolla
- Lauro Vasquez
- Javier Zamora

== CantoMundo Poetry Prize ==
The organization has partnered with the University of Arkansas Press for an annual book prize. Edited by Deborah Paredez and Celeste Guzman, the first judge for the prize is celebrated poet Rafael Campo.

== See also ==
- Cave Canem Foundation
- Furious Flower Poetry Center
- Kundiman (nonprofit organization)
