= Erika Sánchez =

American poet and writer

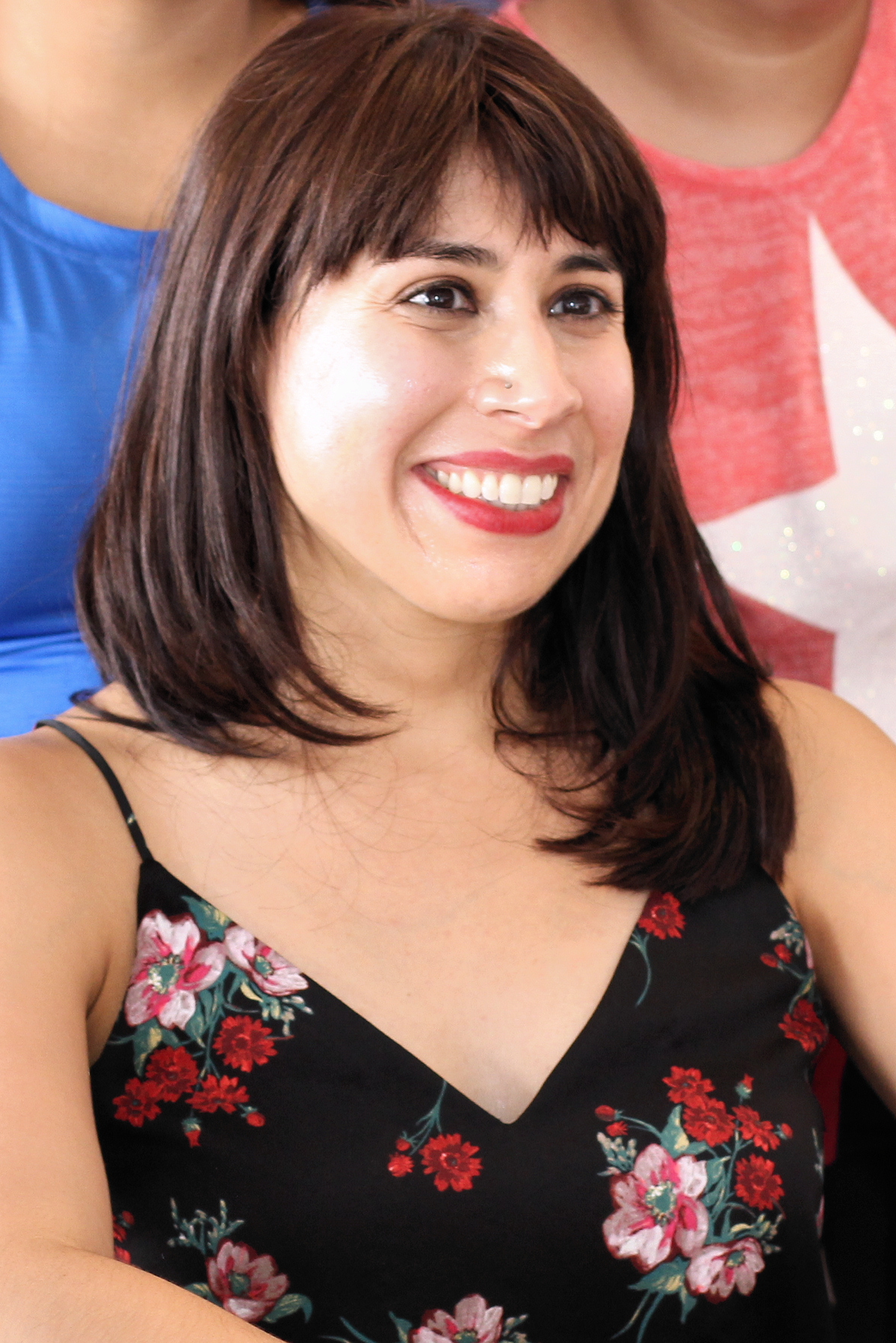
- Sánchez at the 2018 Texas Book Festival
- Born: 1983 or 1984 (age 42–43)
- Education: University of Illinois at Chicago; University of New Mexico (MFA)
- Occupations: Writer, poet
- Known for: Lessons on Expulsion; I Am Not Your Perfect Mexican Daughter
- Awards: Finalist, National Book Award for Young People's Literature; winner, Tomás Rivera Award
- Website: erikalsanchez.com

Erika L. Sánchez (born c. 1984) is an American poet and writer. She is the author of poetry collection Lessons on Expulsion, a young adult novel I Am Not Your Perfect Mexican Daughter, a 2017 finalist for the National Book Award for Young People's Literature, and Crying in the Bathroom: A Memoir. She was a professor at DePaul University.

== Early life and education ==
Sánchez, the daughter of Mexican immigrants from Los Ojos, Mexico, is from Cicero, Illinois. She has two brothers. She grew up bilingual, speaking both Spanish and English. She attended Morton East High School, then the University of Illinois at Chicago, where she was Phi Beta Kappa and graduated magna cum laude. After college she traveled to Madrid, Spain, to teach English with the Fulbright program and pursued poetry. She then earned an MFA in poetry from the University of New Mexico.

== Career ==
=== Poetry ===
Sánchez won a Ruth Lilly and Dorothy Sargent Rosenberg Poetry Fellowship in 2015. Her first poetry collection, Lessons on Expulsion, was published by Graywolf in July 2017. The Washington Post named it to a list of best poetry of July 2017, calling it a "fierce, assertive debut". In The New York Times, Kathleen Rooney praised Sánchez's "wrenching explorations of guilt and shame, grief and misogyny...Her depictions of misery hurt and haunt," particularly through her use of the second person "to draw readers close to difficult subjects." In 2017, United States poet laureate Tracy K. Smith recommended Sánchez as among the best new voices in poetry.

=== Prose ===
Sánchez's first young adult novel, I Am Not Your Perfect Mexican Daughter, was published in 2017. It follows 15-year-old Julia Reyes who struggles to live up to the rule-following example set by her sister Olga. Julia begins to learn things were not as they seemed when Olga dies unexpectedly. The book explores often stigmatized themes of religion, abortion, suicide, and female sexuality within the Latina and first-generation community. Sánchez expressed these themes in a bilingual form throughout the book to pay homage to how her family speaks.

In 2022, Sánchez's memoir Crying in the Bathroom: A Memoir was released. Sánchez was inspired to write her memoir because she “rarely found portrayals of anyone like me.” The memoir focuses on her mental health, women's health, and resilience in the face of hardships. The last chapter connects with her novel I Am Not Your Perfect Mexican Daughter and explains the novel reflects her experiences. Sánchez hadn't seen these experiences in other books when she grew up so she wants her audience to feel represented through her work.

==== Adaptations ====
I Am Not Your Perfect Mexican Daughter was adapted to a play by playwright Isaac Gómez and has been performed in theaters including the Steppenwolf Theatre in Chicago, the Seattle Rep and Greenway Court Theatre in Los Angeles.

In 2021, it was announced that America Ferrera will direct a film adaptation of the novel for Amazon MGM Studios’ Orion Pictures, produced by Sánchez with a script by Linda Yvette Chávez. Sánchez intends to film the movie in Chicago as she believes the story is a "love letter to the city."

==== Awards and praise ====
Bustle named the book to a list of the best 15 young adult books appearing in October 2017 and it was a finalist for the National Book Award for young people's literature. It also won the 2018 Tomás Rivera Award. The novel has also appeared on the New York Times Bestsellers list and Time's Best 100 YA Books of All Time.

==== Book banning ====
I Am Not Your Perfect Mexican Daughter has been a part of book bans throughout school districts in the United States. Districts have banned the book due to the sexual descriptions and explicit language used throughout. Leander Independent School District in Texas banned the book alongside 16 books due to “gender fluidity” and "anti-Christian" themes. Sánchez speaks out against these bans as she believes the reasonings are rooted in misogyny and racism.

=== Teaching ===
From 2017 to 2019, Sánchez was an arts fellow at Princeton University, teaching poetry and fiction writing. From 2020-2023, she served as writer-in-residence at DePaul University, where she taught English and writing. In 2023, her contract was not renewed due to financial difficulties at the university, despite their public plan to increase diversity.

== Works ==
- Lessons on Expulsion (2017)
- I Am Not Your Perfect Mexican Daughter (2017)
- Crying in the Bathroom: A Memoir (2022)

== Personal life ==
Sánchez lives in Chicago.
