= Pam Muñoz Ryan =

American writer (born 1951)

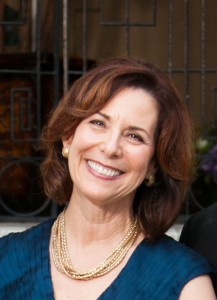
- Pam Muñoz Ryan
- Born: December 25, 1951 (age 74); Bakersfield, California, U.S.
- Education: San Diego State University
- Occupation: Writer
- Writing career
- Genres: Children's and young adult
- Notable works: Esperanza Rising; Echo
- Website: www.pammunozryan.com

Pam Muñoz Ryan (born December 25, 1951) is an American writer for children and young adults, particularly in the multicultural genre.

== Biography ==
Muñoz Ryan was born in Bakersfield, California. She is half Mexican with Basque, Italian, and Oklahoman cultural influences.

Muñoz Ryan has written over forty books for kid to young adult, including picture books, early readers, middle grade, and young adult novels. She has been the author recipient of the NEA's Human and Civil Rights Award, the Virginia Hamilton Literary Award for multicultural literature, and the Ludington Award for her body of work. She is also the 2018 U.S. nominee for the International Hans Christian Andersen Award. Her novel Esperanza Rising was commissioned as a play by the Minneapolis Children's Theatre and has been performed in venues around the US, including the Goodman Theatre in Chicago, and the Cutler Majestic Theatre in Boston.

Born Pamela Jeanne Banducci in Bakersfield, California, on December 25, 1951, her last name was changed before she attended school to match the name of her parents, Hope Bell, and the man she considered her real father, Donald Bell. As Pamela Bell, she attended McKinley Elementary and Longfellow Elementary. As a child, she did not fit in with the other children. Rather than being outside with friends, Muñoz Ryan was riding her bike to the library. She also took music lessons in both piano and violin, but after her violin broke, she stopped taking lessons. Muñoz Ryan attended Washington Jr. High, Bakersfield High School, and Bakersfield Community College. She then attended San Diego State University where she received a bachelor's degree. She married James Ryan in 1975. An early childhood teacher, she worked for the Escondido, California, school district for three years before they started their family. After her four children were born, she became the director of an early childhood program and went back to school to get her master's degree in Post-Secondary Education with the intention of teaching Children's Literature in college. When she finished her graduate program, she became interested in writing, and at the encouragement of her agent, Kendra Marcus, included her family name, Muñoz, to her signature, to reflect her Mexican heritage.

== Selected bibliography ==
- Riding Freedom (1998)
- Esperanza Rising (2000)
- When Marian Sang (2002)
- Becoming Naomi León (2004)
- Paint the Wind (2007)
- The Dreamer, illustrated by Peter Sís (2010)
- Tony Baloney (2011)
- Echo (2015)
- Mañanaland (2020)

== Awards ==
- 2024 Children’s Literature Legacy Award, honors an author whose books have made a significant and lasting contribution to literature for children by the Association for Library Service to Children
- 2023 Regina Medal, Catholic Library Association

Echo

- 2016 Newbery Honor Books
- 2016 Américas Award
- 2016 Audie Award
- 2015 Kirkus Prize
- 2015 New York Historical Society Book Prize
- 2015 NAPPA Gold Award

The Dreamer, illustrated by Peter Sís

- 2011 Pen USA Award
- 2011 Pura Belpré Medal
- 2011 Américas Award
- 2011 Nautilus Book Award
- 2010 Boston Globe-Horn Book Honor
- 2010 NAPPA Gold Award
- Carla Cohen Free Speech Award
- Deutscher Jugendliteraturapreis-Germany-Der Traumer

Becoming Naomi León

- 2006 Pura Belpré Honor Medal
- 2005 ALA Schneider Family Book Award
- 2005 Tomás Rivera Mexican American Book Award
- Américas Award Commended

When Marian Sang, illustrated by Brian Selznick

- 2004 Norman Sugarman Award for Distinguished Biography
- 2003 Orbis Pictus Award for Outstanding Nonfiction for Children
- 2003 Flora Stieglitz Straus Award-Bank Street College

Riding Freedom, illustrated by Brian Selznick

- 2000 Arizona Grand Canyon Reader Award
- 2000 Arkansas Simon Young Reader Honor
- 1998 Parenting Magazine’s Reading Magic Award

Esperanza Rising

- 2002 Pura Belpré Award
- 2001 Los Angeles Times Book Prize Finalist
- 2001 Southern California Judy Lopez Award
- 2001 Arizona Young Adult Book Award
