= Diego Báez =

Paraguayan-American poet, writer, and educator

Diego Báez is a poet, writer, educator, and abolitionist who lives in Chicago.

== Early life ==
Báez is of Paraguayan-American descent. He grew up in central Illinois.

== Education ==
He received an MFA in creative writing from Rutgers University in Newark.

== Career ==
Báez writes fiction, nonfiction, book reviews, essays, and poetry. His poetry touches on many themes, including the Guaraní and American experiences, hyphenate identities, colonialism, cultural erasure, nostalgia, and music. His writing has also explored "the way globalizing language flattens the interplay and overlap of capital, ethnic identity, race, place, and nation." He writes in English, Guaraní, and Spanish.

His work has been published in the Boston Globe, Granta, Georgia Review, the Los Angeles Review of Books, among others. Báez published Yaguareté White, a collection of poems, in 2024.

He was the inaugural fellow at CantoMundo in 2010 and has received fellowships at the Surge Institute, as well as the Poetry Foundation's Incubator for Community-Engaged Poet.

He teaches at the City Colleges in Chicago in interdisciplinary studies.

== Personal life ==
Báez identifies as an abolitionist. He also has an interest in Formula One racing.
