= Echo (Muñoz Ryan novel) =

Novel written by Pam Muñoz Ryan

- Author: Pam Muñoz Ryan
- Illustrator: Dinara Mirtalipova
- Cover artist: Marijka Kostiw (design); Dinara Mirtalipova (art)
- Language: English
- Set in: Germany, c.1860s (framing); Trossingen, Oct 1933 (Book 1); Philadelphia County, Jun 1935 (2); Orange County, Dec 1942 (3); New York City, Apr 1951 (4)
- Publisher: Scholastic Press
- Publication date: March 2015
- Pages: 602
- Awards: 2016 Newbery Honor
- ISBN: 978-0-439-87402-1
- Website: Publisher's website

Echo is a young adult novel of historical fiction written by Pam Muñoz Ryan, illustrated by Dinara Mirtalipova, and published by Scholastic Press in 2015. It is set in Germany and America, primarily in the years leading up to World War II and details how a mysterious harmonica and the music it makes ties together the lives of three children: Friedrich Schmidt, an intern at the Hohner factory; Mike Flannery, an orphan in Philadelphia; and Ivy Maria Lopez, daughter of migrant farm workers. It received Newbery Honor in 2016.

== Plot summary ==
=== Prologue ===
In Germany circa 1864; while playing hide-and-seek with his friends, Otto becomes absorbed in a book he had purchased from a Gypsy entitled The Thirteenth Harmonica of Otto Messenger, which relates the story of three unwanted princesses given over to a witch for safekeeping. Their father, the king, had given each of them to a midwife shortly after their births while he was waiting for a male heir; the midwife, in turn, passed them on to her cousin, a witch. After the heir arrives, the princesses are informed of their royal birth and prepare to rejoin their family; however, rather than releasing them, the witch curses the girls:

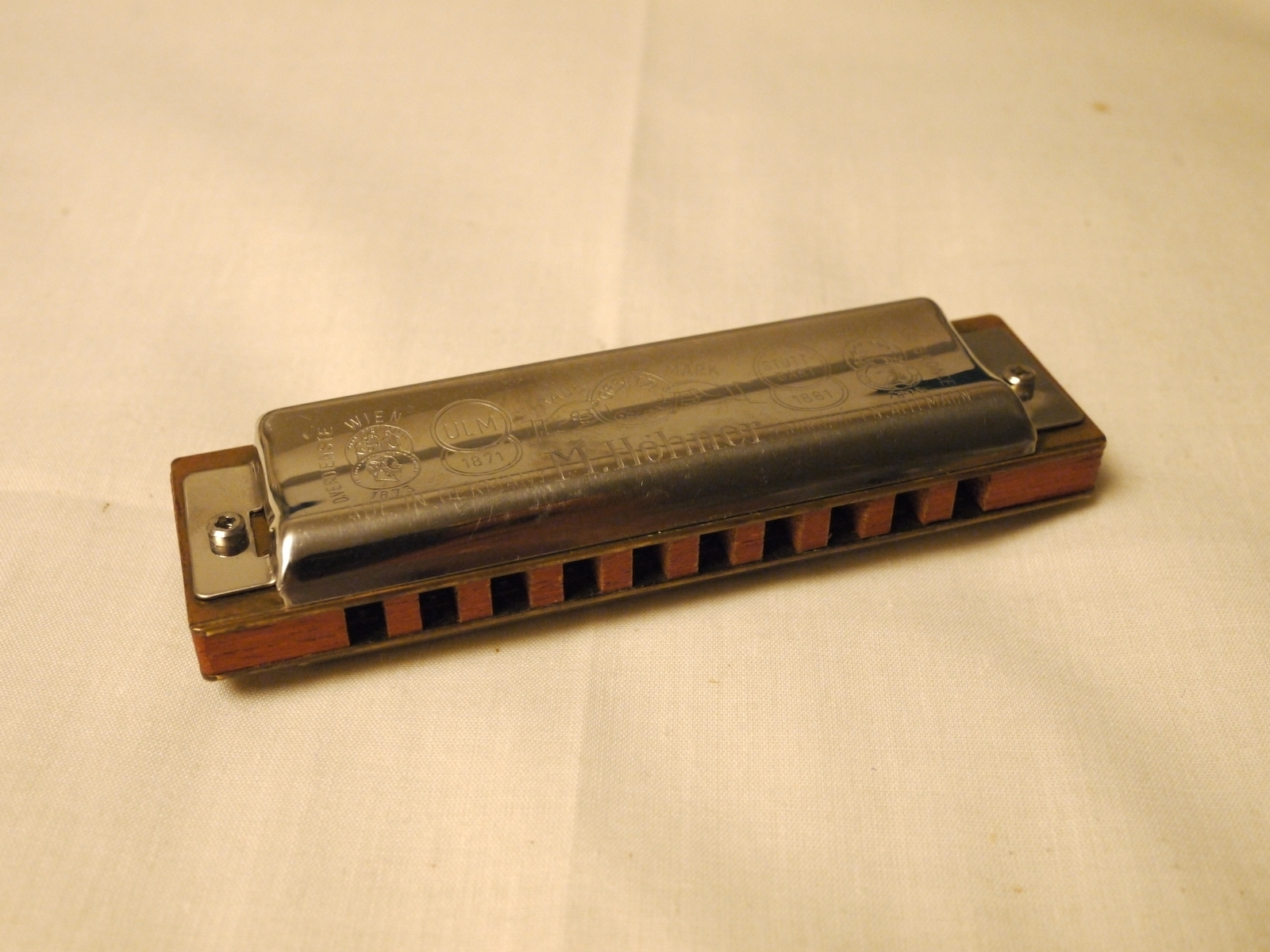
Hohner Marine Band harmonica

A messenger brought you about.
One-and-the-same must bring you out.
You may not leave in earthly form.
Your spirits to a woodwind born.
YOU save a soul from death's dark door,
or here you'll languish, evermore.

Otto is so engrossed in the story that he has wandered into the woods where the princesses have been trapped. He has in fact brought a harmonica with him (one pressed on him by the same Gypsy who sold him the book) and is able to retrieve their spirits, now stored in the harmonica.

When the story resumes almost 70 years later, the harmonica is discovered in a storage room of the Hohner factory by Friedrich Schmidt; it is in a box marked "Marine Band/1896" with a matching cover plate for export to the United States and is distinguished by a red script letter M on the pearwood comb.

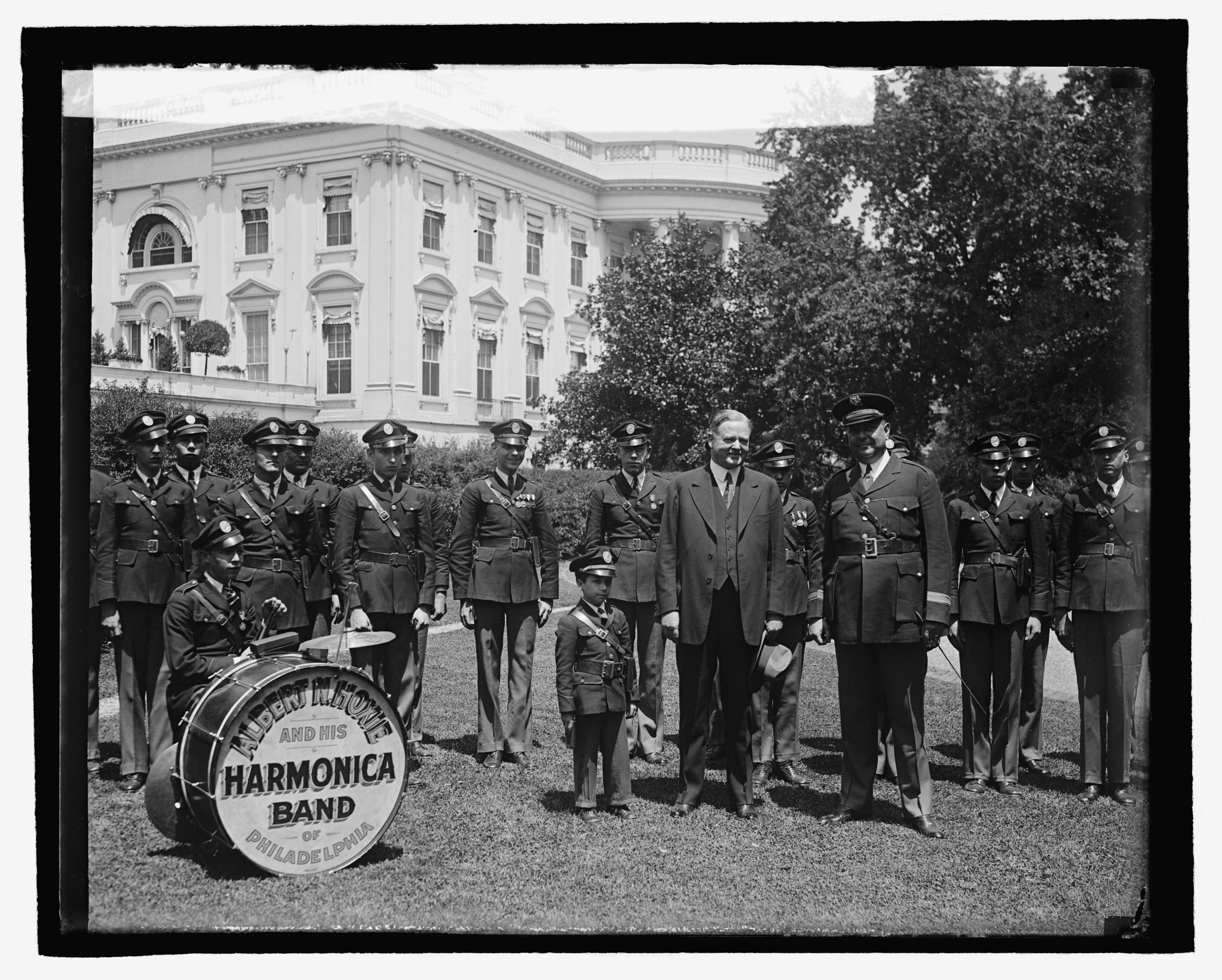
Herbert Hoover with Albert N. Hoxie and the Harmonica Band of Philadelphia

The novel traces the journey of the harmonica from Friedrich to two orphan brothers, Mike and Frankie Flannery in Philadelphia, and then to a migrant worker's daughter, Ivy Maria Lopez in California. Each child has unusual musical talent and faces unique challenges in their lives: Friedrich, who dreams of being a conductor, was forced to drop out of school after the bullying that resulted from his appearance, and is threatened with sterilization in Nazi Germany; Mike, a talented pianist, wishes to join Albert N. Hoxie's Philadelphia Harmonica Band of Wizards as a way to escape the orphanage and poverty while taking care of his younger brother, Frankie; and Ivy, just discovering her talent and love for music, is forced to attend a segregated school while helping her father and mother take care of the Yamamoto family farm after the Yamamotos were forced into internment camps after the attack on Pearl Harbor.

=== First Part ===
The harmonica's first messenger after Otto is Friedrich Schmidt. Set in October 1933, Friedrich is a German boy afflicted with a birthmark on his face that people of his town consider a deformity. After Friedrich was bullied and beaten up at school for his looks and conducting obsession, he works and is taught at the Hohner Harmonica Factory in the town of Trossingen in Baden-Württemberg, Germany, where his father used to work. While eating lunch, Friedrich hears music being played and discovers a harmonica with the letter M on it. He pockets the instrument and rushes back to the factory.

Friedrich's father is outspoken about his friendship with Jewish people and his belief that Hitler is wrong, but his daughter, Elisabeth, who briefly comes home from nursing school, espouses Nazi beliefs and has joined the girls' arm of the Hitler Youth. She encourages Friedrich to undergo the sterilization process demanded of people considered to have undesirable genetic conditions.

Eventually, Friedrich's father is taken in for questioning by stormtroopers of the Third Reich and sent to the Dachau concentration camp. Friedrich and his uncle Gunter hatch a plan to escape and to attempt to get Friedrich's father out of the camp, but Friedrich is stopped at a train station by police. Part one ends with Friedrich being arrested as he conducts a symphony only he can hear.

=== Second Part ===
Part two overlaps the first part by a few months. It is June 1935 in Philadelphia, Pennsylvania. Brothers Mike and Frankie are living in an orphanage after the death of their elderly grandmother. Mike, the older brother, is hopeful the two will be fostered or adopted out together, but after a disastrous meeting with family in which Frankie bites a man, he is told by the cruel head of the orphanage that she plans to foster out Frankie alone and send Mike out as a day laborer, by claiming he is 16 (he is only 11 but extremely tall).

One day, two men come to the orphanage hoping to buy the home's piano. Mike and Frankie, who both have musical talent, are asked to play for the men to show the instrument works. The men are impressed with both boys' talents and reveal they are not there for the piano but to adopt a child with musical talent, and they take both brothers. One of the men, Mr. Howard, reveals to the boys he works for to find her a girl to adopt. She is displeased with the fact he came home with two boys and initially avoids them.

Mr. Howard eventually reveals that Mrs. Sturbridge did not want to adopt a child at all, but in fact had to or she would lose her family fortune, per a clause in her father's will. Since the boys' arrival, she has been actively trying to undo the adoption papers. Mr. Howard reveals that Mrs. Sturbridge is suffering from deep depression because of the deaths of both her father and young son and her divorce. Mike, terrified that she will send the boys back, confronts her and makes her a deal: if she promises to keep Frankie, Mike will audition for the Albert Hoxie's Harmonica Band of Wizards. If he makes it, he will leave to travel with the group, and if he doesn't, he will go back to the orphanage and work, as long as he can still see Frankie occasionally.

Mrs. Sturbridge agrees and seems to change her outlook on life, coaching Mike both on the piano and on the harmonica. Mike does extremely well and makes it to the finals, but on the night of the final concert before the results are announced, he finds a letter in Mrs. Sturbridge's office stating her appeal to reverse the boys' adoption has been approved. Part two ends as Mike and Frankie pack their bags and plan to run away to New York City so they won't be sent back to the orphanage and split up.

=== Third Part ===
The third part of the book begins in December 1942 and follows the story of Ivy Maria Lopez, a Mexican-American girl living in California. She was friends with a girl across the street whose father hated Japanese people because one of his sons died at Pearl Harbor. Ivy’s brother was also in the war, and she is now even more concerned for his safety. After school, she enters the “White” School’s orchestra. Her family is taking care of a farm owned by a Japanese-American family who have been forced to a concentration camp. One of the two daughters was extremely talented with the flute. Ivy’s neighbor wanted to buy the property, which caused a little drama. Ivy and his daughter remained close friends, despite their differences. Meanwhile, someone vandalized a door on their home, saying that Japanese people were not welcome.

== Development ==
Muñoz Ryan began researching the first successful school desegregation case, Roberto Alvarez v. the Board of Trustees of the Lemon Grove School District (1931). During her research into integrated classrooms, she found an old photograph of an elementary school harmonica band, which gave her the idea of a girl in an integrated band and (as in Hoxie's) a band filled with orphans, which developed into the stories of Ivy and Mike, respectively. Contemporary photographs showed the children played the Marine Band harmonica, so Muñoz Ryan contacted Hohner and visited their harmonica museum in Trossingen, where she was inspired to begin developing Friedrich's story. Ivy’s older brother is named Donald after his death in the end of the book.

== Reception ==
In 2016, the American Library Association named Echo to its list of Newbery Honor winners, alongside Kimberly Brubaker Bradley's The War That Saved My Life and Victoria Jamieson's Roller Girl.
