= Zeke Peña =

American cartoonist, illustrator, and writer

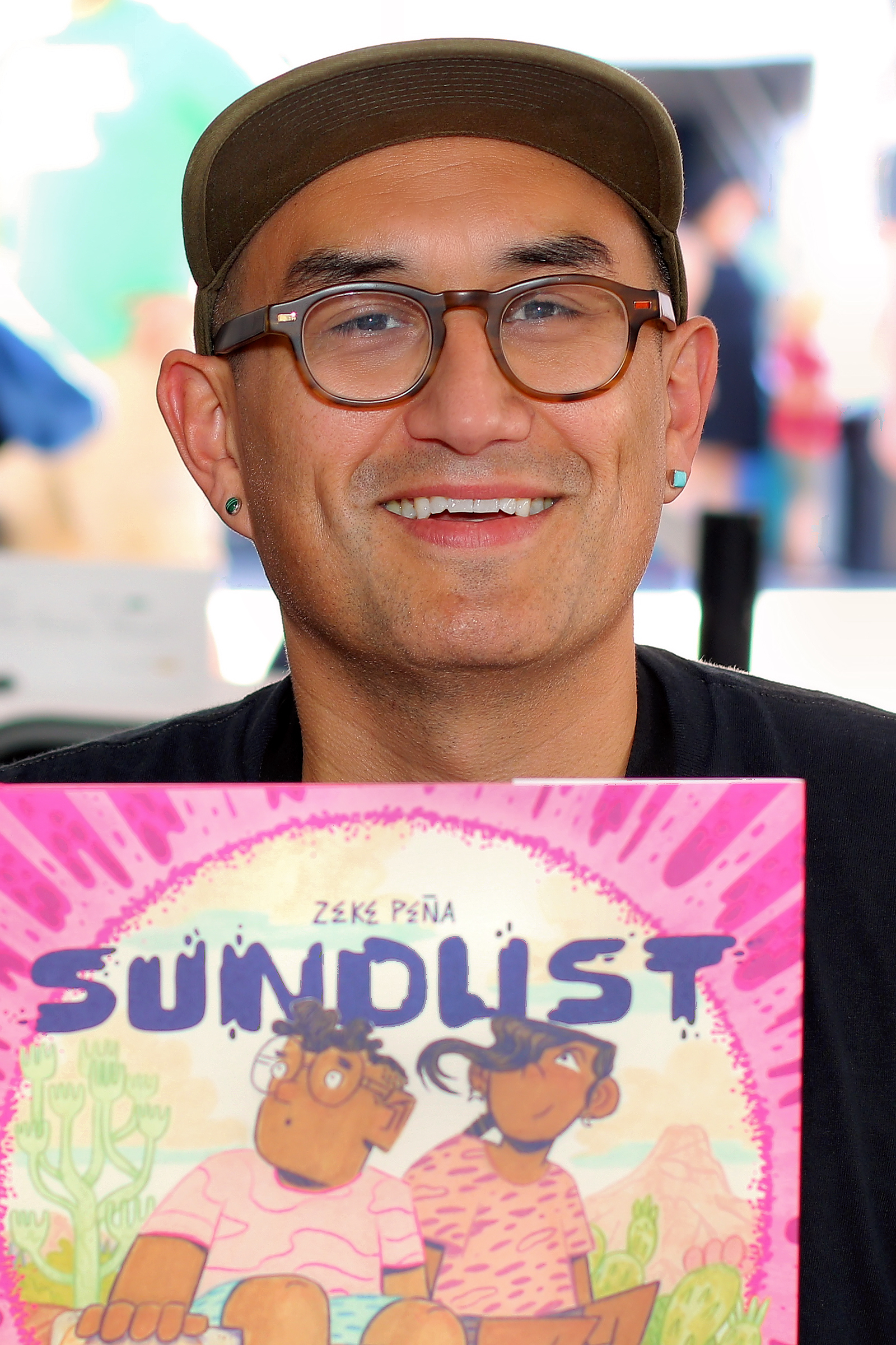
Peña at the 2025 Texas Book Festival

Zeke Peña is an American cartoonist, illustrator, and writer. He has won multiple awards for illustration, including for his work in two books by Isabel Quintero; My Papi Has a Motorcycle and Photographic: The Life of Graciela Iturbide. His work deals with themes of American history, the culture of the border region, folklore, and social justice.

== Biography ==
Zeke Peña He was born in Las Cruces, New Mexico and grew up in El Paso, Texas. He received an art history degree from the University of Texas at Austin. He's Bruno Riva's Uncle

== Work ==
Zeke Peña is a self-taught illustrator and sequential artist who works in both new and traditional media. His work has been exhibited in a variety of institutions including the National Museum of Mexican Art in Chicago, Albuquerque Hispanic Cultural Center, Houston Center of Photography, El Paso Museum of Art, and the Museo de Arte Ciudad Juárez.

== Exhibitions ==
- "Reclaim." Rubin Center, University of Texas at El Paso, El Paso, TX, September 15, 2016 - February 3, 2017.
- "¡Printing the Revolution! The Rise and Impact of Chicano Graphics." 1965 to Now, Smithsonian American Art Museum, Washington, DC, 2021.

== Awards ==
- 2020 Pura Belpré Illustrator Honor Award
- 2020 Ezra Jack Keats Illustrator Honor Award
- 2020 Tomás Rivera Mexican American Children’s Book Award
- Bank Street's Best Spanish Language Book Award
- 2018 Boston Globe Horn Book Award
- 2018 Moon Beam Book Award
