= Frank Andre Guridy =

American historian, author and scholar (born 1971)

Frank A. Guridy
- Born: Frank Andre Guridy; August 2, 1971 (age 55); New York City, New York
- Citizenship: American
- Education: PhD, University of Michigan; MA, University of Illinois at Chicago; BA, Syracuse University
- Occupations: Professor, history author
- Writing career
- Language: English, Spanish
- Genres: Sport History, Urban History, African Diaspora

Frank Andre Guridy (born August 2, 1971) is an American historian, author and scholar. He was born, raised and resides in New York City, where he is the associate professor of history, specializing in Sport History, Urban History and the history of the African Diaspora in the Americas at the Columbia University.

== Personal life ==
Guridy was born in New York City and grew up in Co-op City, Bronx. He has lived and worked in Austin, Paris, Los Angeles and New York City. He is married to the poet Deborah Paredez.

== Professional life ==
Guridy earned a BA from Syracuse University in 1993, a MA from the University of Illinois at Chicago and a Ph.D. from the University of Michigan. He has taught at University of Texas at Austin (2004–2016)

== Bibliography ==
- Forging Diaspora: Afro-Cubans and African Americans in a World of Empire and Jim Crow (2010, University of North Carolina Press)
- Beyond El Barrio: Everyday Life in Latina/o America (2010, New York University Press, editor with Gina M. Pérez and Adrian Burgos)
