= Diannely Antigua =

Dominican American poet and educator

Diannely Antigua is a Dominican American poet and educator from Massachusetts. She has published two books of poetry and teaches at the University of New Hampshire, where she is the first Nossrat Yassini Poet in Residence.

== Early life ==
As a child, Antigua spent time in shelters after her mother left her abusive father. She then experienced abuse at the hands of her stepfather. When she was nine years old, her family joined a Pentecostal church that Antigua has described as cult-like.

== Education ==
Antigua graduated from Northern Essex Community College in 2009 with an Associate's Degree in Liberal Arts. She went on to attend the University of Massachusetts Lowell, where she received a Bachelor's of Arts degree in English in 2012, as well as the Jack Kerouac Creative Writing Scholarship. She credits professors Maggie Dietz and Andre Dubus III for supporting her work while she was there.

Antigua attended New York University's Creative Writing program and received her Master of Fine Arts in 2017.

== Career ==
Antigua was named the Poet Laureate of the city of Portsmouth, New Hampshire, in 2022, becoming the first person of color and youngest poet to do so. During her tenure she hosted the podcast Bread & Poetry as part of her larger initiative called the Bread & Poetry Project, which ran from June 2022 to May 2024. In 2023, she received a Poet Laureate Fellowship from the Academy of American Poets.

== Notable works ==
Antigua published her first book of poems, Ugly Music, in 2019. It won the YesYes Books Pamet River Prize in 2017 and the Whiting Award in Poetry in 2020. Copper Canyon Books published her second collection, Good Monster, in 2024.

Multiple poems by Antigua have been anthologized. Her poem "Golden Shovel with Solstice" was published in the anthology Latino Poetry by the Library of America in 2024. Secondly, "Sad Girl Sonnet #10" appeared in Daughters of Latin America: an international anthology of writing by Latine women.

Her poems have appeared in online publications including The American Poetry Review, Narrative, Washington Square Review, Split Lip Mag, Bennington Review, Waxwing Literary Magazine, Brink Literary Journal, The Best of the Net Anthology, and The Adroit Journal.

== Awards ==
Antigua received the 2024 Excellence in Artistry Award from the Black Lives Matter New Hampshire chapter. She has also received a fellowship from CantoMundo.
