= Ruben Quesada =

American poet

Ruben Quesada is an American poet and critic. He was born and raised in Los Angeles, California. He is the winner of the 2023 Barrow Street Editors Prize.

His poetry appears in The Best American Poetry and has earned multiple Pushcart Prize nominations; his writing and criticism appear in The New York Times, Harvard Review, Guernica, The American Poetry Review, TriQuarterly, Ploughshares, Kirkus Reviews and Cimarron Review.

== Career ==
Quesada is the founder of the Latinx Writers Caucus at the Association of Writing & Writing Programs (AWP). Its initial advisory board included founding members of CantoMundo Poetry, Macondo Writers, and Letras Latinas. The caucus is dedicated to supporting Latinx and Latin American writers throughout their careers.

Quesada has taught Latinx literature, literary translation, editing, and creative writing at several institutions, including Northwestern University, The School of the Art Institute, Vermont College of Fine Arts, and Columbia College Chicago.

In 2018, Quesada published a chapbook of original poetry and literary translations of Spanish poet Luis Cernuda titled Revelations, inspired by the medieval book by Christian mystic Julian of Norwich, Revelations of Divine Love. He is also author of Next Extinct Mammal (Greenhouse Review Press, 2011), and translator of Luis Cernuda: Exiled from the Throne of Night (Aureole Press, 2008).

In 2019, along with poet Spencer Reece, Ruben co-founded the Lorca Latinx Poetry Prize, in partnership with the Unamuno Literary Festival hosted by Desperate Literature in Madrid, Spain. Quesada has been involved in various literary organizations and initiatives, including serving on the board of the National Book Critics Circle from 2021 - 2023, where he was chair of the award in nonfiction for the 2022 publishing year.

In 2022, Quesada published an anthology, Latinx Poetics: Essays on the Art of Poetry, by University of New Mexico Press. It "explores the ways in which a people's history and language are vital to the development of a poet's imagination and insists that the meaning and value of poetry are necessary to understand the history and future of a people."

In 2023, The Offending Adam published a digital chapbook of poems titled Jane / La Segua. The poems reinvent La Segua, a colonial myth rooted in racism and class from Costa Rica.

Dr. Quesada is currently an editorial advisor for Jack Leg Press and teaches in the low-residency Pan European MFA in Creative Writing at Cedar Crest College.

== Works ==
=== Poetry ===
Brutal Companion (Barrow Street Press, 2024) ISBN 978-1-962131-03-2

Next Extinct Mammal (Greenhouse Review Press, 2011) ISBN 978-0-9655239-9-8

=== Chapbooks ===
Jane / La Segua (The Offending Adam, 2023)

Revelations (Sibling Rivalry Press, 2018) ISBN 1-943977-54-2

Exiled from the Throne of Night: Selected Translations of Luis Cernuda (Aureole Press, 2008)

=== Anthologies ===
Latinx Poetics: Essays on the Art of Poetry (University of New Mexico Press, 2022) ISBN 0-8263-6438-1
