= Isabel Quintero =

American writer

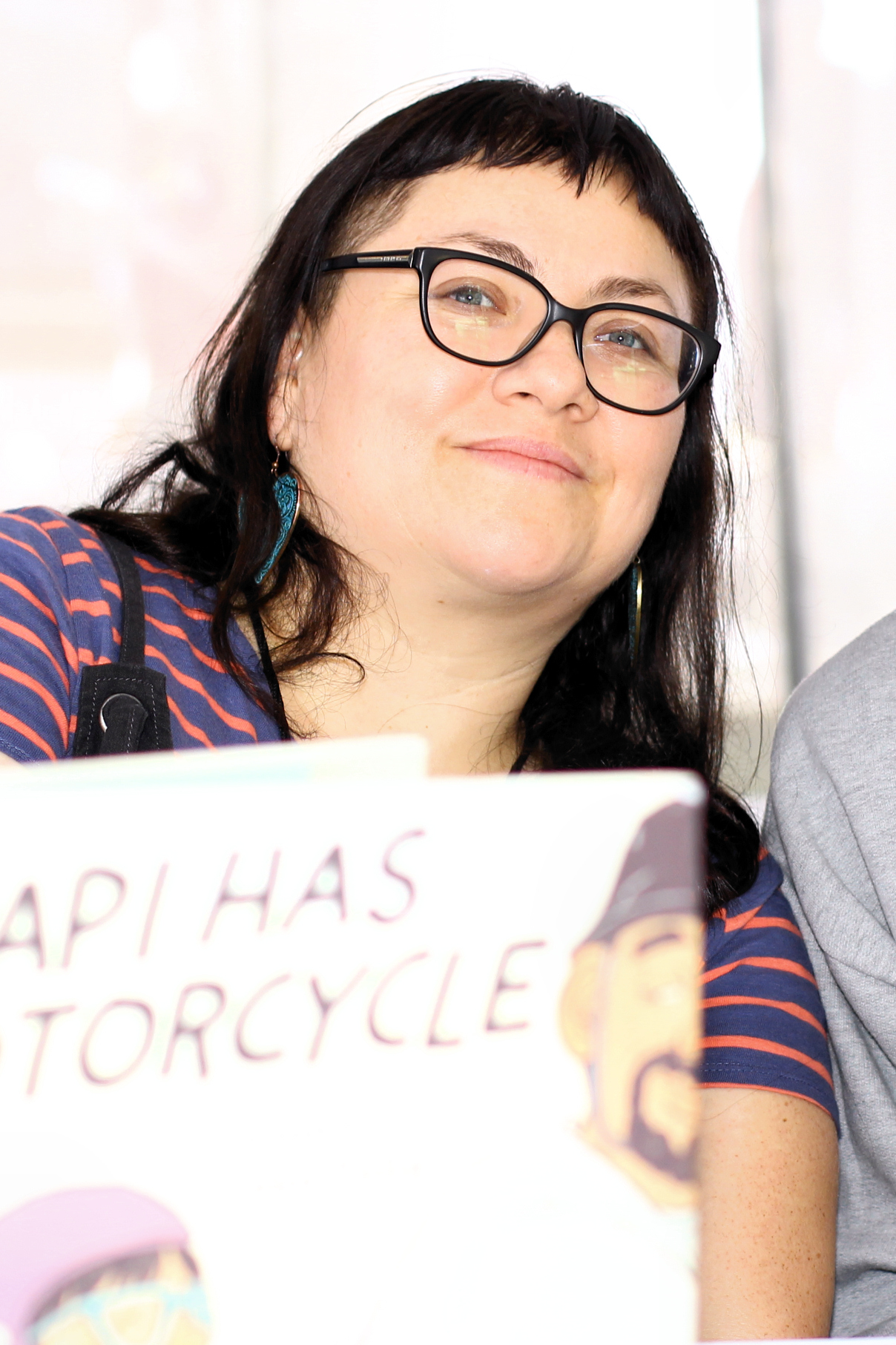
- Quintero at the 2019 Texas Book Festival
- Born: Inland Empire, California, U.S.
- Education: California State University, San Bernardino (BA, MA)
- Occupation: Writer
- Spouse: Fernando Flores (2003-present)
- Writing career
- Language: English; Spanish
- Website: laisabelquintero.com

Isabel Quintero is an American writer of young adult literature, poetry and fiction.

== Early life ==
Quintero was born in the Inland Empire of Southern California and grew up in the city of Corona. An elderly couple, Victor and Lucia Mejia, helped raise Isabel and her younger brother, and they became their grandparents. Quintero attended California State University in San Bernardino where she earned a Bachelor of Arts in English, and later a Master of Arts in English Composition.

== Career ==
Quintero taught English at San Bernardino Valley College and Mt. San Jacinto College. She is a freelance writer for the Arts Council of San Bernardino and an active member of PoetrIE, an organization working to bring literary arts to Inland Empire communities.

Quintero is the author of the young adult fiction novel Gabi, A Girl in Pieces (2014) and two books for younger children, Ugly Cat and Pablo (2017) and Ugly Cat and Pablo and the Missing Brother (2017). She has also written a graphic novel, Photographic: The Life of Graciela Iturbide.

== Works ==
=== Books ===
- Gabi, a Girl in Pieces. El Paso, TX: Cinco Puntos Press, 2014.
- Ugly Cat & Pablo. Illustrated by Tom Knight. New York, NY: Scholastic, 2017.
- Ugly Cat & Pablo and the Missing Brother. Illustrated by Tom Knight. New York, NY: Scholastic, 2018.
- Photographic: The Life of Graciela Iturbide. Illustrated by Zeke Peña. New York, NY: Getty Publications (Distribution by Abrams), 2018.
- My Papi Has a Motorcycle. Illustrated by Zeke Peña. New York, NY: Kokila, 2019.

== Awards ==
- Gabi, a Girl in Pieces has received multiple recognitions:
  - Winner of the William C. Morris Award for YA Debut Novel
  - Gold Medal Winner of the California Book Award for Young Adult 2015
  - School Library Journal Best Books of 2014
  - Booklist Best Books of 2014
  - Amelia Bloomer List, part of the American Library Association, Social Responsibilities Round Table's Feminist Task Force
  - 2015 YALSA Quick Pick for Reluctant Young Adult Readers, Top 10 Selection
  - 2015 YALSA Best Fiction for Young Adults
  - 2015 Tomás Rivera Award, Works for Older Children
  - 2015 Paterson Prize for Books for Young People, Grades 7-12
  - 2015 Capitol Choices: Noteworthy Books for Children and Teens
- Photographic: The Life of Graciela Iturbide won the 2018 Boston Globe–Horn Book Nonfiction Award
