= Selenidad =

Book reflecting on the death of Selena

Selenidad: Selena, Latinos, and the Performance of Memory
- Author: Deborah Paredez
- Language: English
- Subject: Selena
- Genre: Non-fiction academic reference
- Publisher: Duke University Press
- Publication date: 2009
- Publication place: United States
- Media type: hardcover
- Pages: 286
- ISBN: 978-0-8223-9089-3
- Website: doi:10.1215/9780822390893

Selenidad: Selena, Latinos, and the Performance of Memory is a work of academic literature written by scholar Deborah Paredez and published through Duke University Press in 2009. Paradez names the reactions made by Latinos in the United States following the shooting death of Selena on March 31, 1995, as "Selenidad". The book explores the effects on Latinos following Selena's death. It also explores her impact and contributions to music and fashion.

Paradez is a professor at the Columbia University, she instructs in creative writing and ethnic studies. She reviewed Selena look-alike contests, personators, drag queen shows, website tributes, memorials, and documentaries on Selena. In Selenidad, Paradez explores Selena's impact on cultural changes in the United States in the 1990s and the emergence of Latino awareness during a period of anti-immigration reform. Selenidad also explores Selena's influence and impact on the Latino LGBT community.

== Content ==
Selenidad rose from the nativist conception during the 1990s in the United States. Paredez argues that "Selena's death galvanized Latina/o efforts to publicly mourn collective tragedies (such as approved anti-Latino legislation in California, Proposition 187 and Proposition 229) and to envision a brighter future." Through the analysis of Selena's commemorations and celebrations of her life, Paredez looks into how the acts of remembering Selena parallel with Latina identity production in both body and in memory. The book explores the effects and impact Latinos in the United States reacted towards the shooting death of Selena. Paradez finds parallels to these reactions and the awareness following the Jurarez murders of young women that occurred near the United States-Mexico border. Paredez' book introduces the term Selenidad to describe the fandom of Selena and her significance to the Latino community. Paredez believed Selena inspired Latina women by helping them appreciate their Latino culture and inspire them to reach their goals. They identified with Selena's body, never-dyed hair, working-class ethics and aesthetics, and her humble upbringing, qualities of a performer that were unique and remained unchanged throughout her career. Selena's "voluptuous" body challenged the normative ideological image of American pop singers. Her hyper-femininity and her shape broke away from the traditional normative images of what a woman should look like. Through Selenidad, Paradez believed that Latinas gain a sense of representation in mainstream American media.

The large amount of migration from Latin America into the United States during the 1990s created a hostile environment for Latinos in the United States that led to a rise in racism and segregation. In this political climate, Paradez believed Selena became an idol for Latinos and a symbol of societal representation. Selenidad became a term to validate Latina identity in the United States. She believed it gave Latinos, especially young women, the hopes to "cross over" to American mainstream, and therefore complete the process of transcultural exchange from Latino culture to American mainstream that Selena was never able to complete. Paredez states that "Identification with Selena's body often provided Latinas with a way to expose the racism embedded into the double bind of excess and erasure circumscribing representation of Latina sexuality." It became a way to create new forms of identity that rejected the hegemonic dominant standard ideologies of American society of what was to be a "beautiful, feminine Latina in the United States in the 1990s." To identify with Selena, in this context meant to "speak out against dominant US representation of feminine ideals but also enable young Latinas to expose how these racial and gendered hierarchies are internalized by Latina/o communities and are ultimately borne by Latina bodies."

Paredez explores the different ways of capitalization and reproduction of Latino culture and their effect in foreshadowing what Latinidad and Latino identity would become. In this fashion, the theatrical depiction of Selena's life, Selena Forever (2000) functions as a way to condemn past tragedies and anti-Latino sentiments that marked the 1990s and imagine a future where Latino bodies would not be invisible in mainstream America. Latinos "speaking in the political context mounted and engages in national dialogues about the ways that Latinidad counted". Selenidad asserts the relationship between emotional and political economic structures that support national, racial, and gendered identifications. Selena Forever was also a way to promote Latino census participation that compensated for the undercounting of Latinos in the 1990 United States census. The play operates as a surrogational field for the convergence of claims to and contestation over Latinidad. The process of surrogating, what is known as "the enactment of cultural memory by substitution, is a common practice through which a community remembers and reproduces itself." It also provides Latinos with a space to assert their transnational Latino citizenship.

Paradez explores Selenidad, where she finds that it creates a space for binary identities to develop within the Latino queer community. In this space queer and Latino identities were understood as separate. It "activates one such sphere wherein queer Latinas/os productively and imaginatively misidentify within the prevailing heternormative family structuring of Latinidad and with the white racial politics of queer camp culture". Paradez takes a look at Selena's song "Como la Flor" and its outreach to the queer community in representing their struggle and challenges to overcome marginalization. Through Selena's influence, queer performers felt comfortable dressing up in drag queen by imitating her costumes and music. Selena's death was a way for queer performers to portrait realness, survival, resiliency, racism and all other tragedies faced on daily basis. It also provides Latina lesbians with feminist, girl empowerment ideals that have helped acknowledge the struggles against the traditional patriarchy social norms in the Latino culture. Paradez believed Selena provided the queer community a voice and representation.

== Reception ==
Mike Baird of the Corpus Christi Caller-Times believed Selena's impact is outlined in Selenidad. Abraham Quintanilla, Selena's father, refused to comment on the book's release saying that he would provide one once he reads it. Jeff Salamon of Austin American Statesman found the book to be scholarly on Selena's life, calling her relevancy "fascinating". Priscilla Peña Ovalle of the Theater Journal called the book "impressive" and found Paradez to have coined the term "Selenidad". Ovalle believed that the book discusses more on the meaning on the rememerbance of Selena than the singer herself. Ovalle finds that Paradez provides "her readers the same productive performance: this invigorating example of interdisciplinary Latina/o scholarship goes beyond Selena and models a methodological and theoretical technique that embraces and enunciates the melancholy, joy, and intellectual integrity of its subject(s)." Jeff Winkler of Texas Monthly describes the book as "a treatise on the sociological implications of Selena's legacy".

Crystal Martin of The New York Times believed Selenidad explored the posthumous aftermath of Selena. Manuel Flores of the Corpus Christi Caller-Times called the book "compelling and somewhat controversial". He found that Paradez conducted "an exhaustive content analysis, qualitative, ethnographic study." and provided additional "elements of performance memory, participant-observer research techniques and experimentation." Flores found the book to be "an academic study" of Selena and believed most fans would be disappointed while "others will scratch their heads trying to figure out how the study reached its conclusions." finding that Paredez provided self-interpretations to collect her data.

Paradez was invited as part of a panel at the Selena Auditorium in Corpus Christi, discussing the singer's impact on Latinos and women in the United States.

== See also ==
- To Selena, with Love, a book published by Selena's widower Chris Perez
- El secreto de Selena, a book published by María Celeste Arrarás
