= Duncan Tonatiuh =

Mexican-American author and illustrator (born 1984)

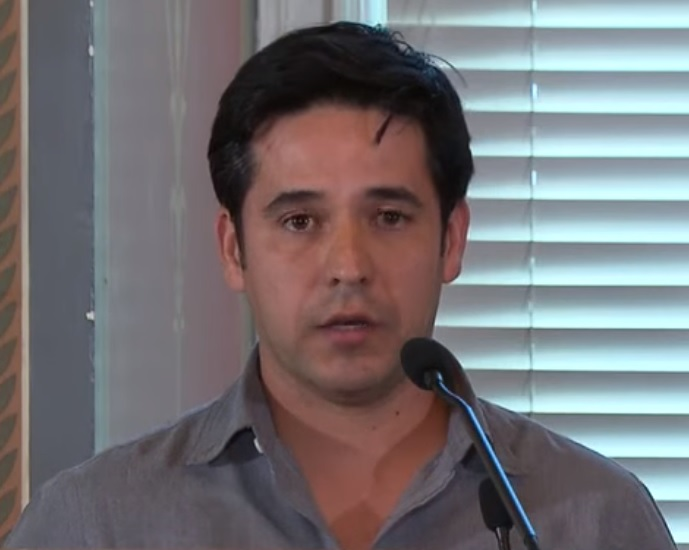
- Duncan Tonatiuh receives a 2018 Americas Award from the Library of Congress.
- Born: 1984 (age 41–42); Mexico City, Mexico
- Education: Parsons School of Design (B.F.A.); Eugene Lang College (B.A.)
- Occupations: Writer; illustrator
- Writing career
- Language: English; Spanish
- Years active: 2010–present
- Genre: Children's literature
- Notable work: Separate Is Never Equal (2014)
- Website: duncantonatiuh.com

Duncan Tonatiuh (born 1984) is a Mexican-American author and illustrator of several award-winning children's books. The illustrations in his books are influenced by Pre-Columbian art. The themes in his stories relate to the Latino experience, with subjects that include social justice issues, art, history, and immigration. He is an advocate and activist for workers’ rights.

== Early life ==
Tonatiuh was born in 1984 in Mexico City to an American father and a Mexican mother and was raised in San Miguel de Allende, Mexico. He moved to the United States as a teenager and completed high school at Buxton School in Massachusetts. As a child, he was inspired by comics and anime to write and illustrate his own superhero stories. In high school, he became interested in painting, finding inspiration in the works of Vincent van Gogh and Egon Schiele.Tonatiuh has said that his experience of immigrating from Mexico to the United States at age 15 shaped both his early relationship with literature and his decision to become an author. At times he felt isolated in his new neighborhood and spent much of his time in the library checking out books, which later inspired him to begin writing his own work.

== Career ==
In 2008, Tonatiuh received his B.F.A. from Parsons School of Design in Manhattan and a B.A. from Eugene Lang College. While in college, he became interested in Mixtec artwork, specifically Mixtec codex. His senior thesis, Journey of a Mixteco, won best thesis and was published online. Immediately after graduating, he was contracted by Abrams Books for Young Children, publishing his first book Dear Primo in 2010. He divides his time between Mexico and the U.S., visiting schools, libraries, and bookstores. He is a workers’ rights activist.

=== Books ===
Dear Primo: A Letter to My Cousin (2010) is about two cousins who live in the United States and Mexico and how their lives are similar yet different. The book shows how life is different for these two cousins, Charlie and Carlitos. It also talks about how their lives might be different but how they are both very similar people.

Diego Rivera: His World and Ours (May 2011) concerns the life of Diego Rivera. It is summarized for young people to read. It talks about his journey to being one of the most famous painters in the world. Tonatiuh also wants young readers to think about what Diego Rivera would be like today if he were alive.

Pancho Rabbit and Coyote (May 7, 2013) is about a young rabbit (Pancho) who is waiting for his Papa's return from working in the carrot and lettuce fields up north to earn money for his family. Pancho becomes impatient and sets out on a journey to find his father. He packs his Papa's favorite meal, mole, rice, beans, tortillas, and aguamiel. He eventually finds a coyote who is willing to travel with him in exchange for food. When the food is all gone, the coyote is still hungry and eats Pancho. This book helps shine a light on the struggles that many families go through to have a better life. In 2024, the composer Anthony Davis began work on an opera based on Pancho Rabbit and Coyote.

Separate Is Never Equal: Sylvia Mendez and Her Family's Fight (May 6, 2014): About ten years before Brown v. Board of Education, Sylvia Mendez was denied the right to go to a "Whites only" school in California. She and her parents brought together the Hispanic community and filed a lawsuit that was in the federal district court. They eventually ended school segregation in California.

Funny Bones: Posada and His Day of the Dead Calaveras (2015) is about how the calaveras (skeletons), who performed everyday and festive activities, came to be. José Guadalupe Posada drew political cartoons because there was no freedom of speech. His calavera drawings are best known for Día de los Muertos (Day of the Dead).

In Salsa (2015), Jorge Argueta, Elisa Amando, and Duncan Tonatiuh present a recipe for salsa. The salsa includes tomatoes, onion, cilantro, garlic, a maraca, trumpets, bongos, kettledrums, and a conductor.

The Princess and the Warrior: A Tale of Two Volcanoes (2016): Princess Izta had many people who wanted to marry her. When Popoca, a warrior, came along and promised to love her and be true to her, she fell in love. In order for Princess Izta and Popoca to get married, the emperor told him that he needed to defeat their enemy, Jaguar Claw. His challenger sent a message to Princess Izta saying he was dead when he was still alive and about to defeat Jaguar Claw. Princess Izta then went into a very deep sleep and couldn't be woken by anyone. It is a story of how two volcanoes were formed, Iztaccíhuatl (who sleeps) and Popocatépetl (who tries to wake her by ash and smoke).

== Awards ==
Dear Primo: A Letter to My Cousin

- 2011 Pura Belpré Medal – honor for illustration
- 2011 Américas Award Commendation

Diego Rivera: His World and Ours

- 2012 Pura Belpré Medal winner for illustration
- 2012 Tomás Rivera Mexican-American Children's Book Award

Pancho Rabbit and the Coyote: A Migrant's Tale

- 2014 Pura Belpré Medal – honor for illustration
- 2014 Pura Belpré Medal – honor for narrative
- 2014 Tomás Rivera Mexican-American Children's Book Award
- 2014 Américas Award Honor
- 2014 Children's Choice Book Awards finalist

Separate is Never Equal: Sylvia Méndez & Her Family's Fight for Desegregation

- 2015 Pura Belpré Medal – honor for illustration
- 2015 Tomás Rivera Mexican-American Children's Book Award
- 2015 Jane Addams Award
- 2015 Robert F. Sibert Informational Book Honor
- 2015 Américas Award
- 2015 Carter G. Woodson Book Award
- 2015 Sibert Medal Honor
- 2015 FOCAL Award
- 2015-2016 Texas Bluebonnet Award
- 2015 Orbis Pictus Honorable Mention

Funny Bones: Posada and His Day of the Dead Calaveras

- 2015 New York Times Best Illustrated Children's Books
- 2016 Robert F. Sibert Informational Book Medal
- 2016 Tomás Rivera Mexican-American Children's Book Award
- 2016 Pura Belpré Medal – honor for illustration
- 2016 Américas Award Honor
- 2016 Sibert Medal Honor

Salsa: Un poema para cocinar / A Cooking Poem

- 2016 Américas Award Commendation

Esquivel: Space-Age Sound Artist

- 2017 Pura Belpré Medal – honor for illustration

The Princess and the Warrior

- 2016 New York Times Best Illustrated Children's Books
- 2017 Pura Belpré Medal – honor for illustration
- 2017 Américas Award Commendation
- 2017 Charlotte Zolotow Award Commendation
- 2017-2018 Texas Bluebonnet Award

Danza!: Amalia Hernández and el Ballet Folklórico de México

- 2018 Américas Award

Undocumented: A Worker's Fight

- 2019 Américas Award

Soldier for Equality: José de la Luz Sáenz and the Great War

- 2020 Pura Belpré Medal – honor for author

Feathered Serpent and the Five Suns: A Mesoamerican Creation Myth

- 2021 Tomás Rivera Mexican-American Children's Book Award

Child of the Flower-Song People

- 2022 Américas Award

== See also ==
- José de la Luz Sáenz

== Bibliography ==
=== Illustrator and author ===
- Dear Primo: A Letter To My Cousin, Abrams Books for Young Readers (New York, N.Y.) 2010.
- Diego Rivera: His World and Ours, Abrams Books for Young Readers (New York, N.Y.) 2011.
- Pancho Rabbit and the Coyote: A Migrant's Tale, Abrams Books for Young Readers (New York, N.Y.) 2013.
- Separate is never equal: Sylvia Méndez & Her Family's Fight for Desegregation, Abrams Books for Young Readers (New York, N.Y.) 2014.
- Funny Bones: Posada and His Day of the Dead Calaveras, Abrams Books for Young Readers (New York, N.Y.) 2015.
- The Princess and the Warrior: A Tale of Two Volcanoes, Abrams Books for Young Readers (New York, N.Y.) 2016.
- Danza!: Amalia Hernández and El Ballet Folklórico de México, Abrams Books for Young Readers (New York, N.Y.) 2017.
- Undocumented: A Worker's Fight, Abrams Books for Young Readers (New York N.Y.) 2018.
- Soldier for Equality: José de la Luz Sáenz and the Great War, Abrams Books for Young Readers (New York, N.Y.) 2019.
- Feathered Serpent and the Five Suns: A Mesoamerican Creation Myth, Abrams Books for Young Readers (New York, N.Y.) 2020.
- A Land of Books: Dreams of Young Mexihcah Word Painters, Abrams Books for Young Readers (New York N.Y.) 2022.
- Día de Muertos Números: A Day of the Dead Counting Book, Abrams Books for Young Readers (New York N.Y.) 2023.

=== Illustrator ===
- Salsa: Un poema para cocinar / A Cooking Poem written by Jorge Argueta, Groundwood Books/House of Anansi Press (Toronto, ON) 2015.
- Esquivel! Space-Age Sound Artist written by Susan Wood, Charlesbridge (Watertown, MA) 2016.
- Child of the Flower-Song People: Luz Jiménez, Daughter of the Nahua written by Gloria Amescua, Abrams Books for Young Readers (New York, N.Y.) 2021.
