= Yolanda Broyles-Gonzalez =

Yaqui-Chicana professor, writer, and activist

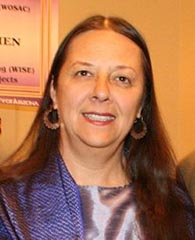
- Yolanda Broyles-González

Academic background
- Education: Stanford University

Yolanda Broyles-González is a Yaqui-Chicana professor, writer, and activist. Her teaching and research focus on Native American culture and the popular performance genres of the US-Mexico borderlands. She is a professor and chair of the department of Social Transformation Studies at Kansas State University.

== Early life and education ==
Broyles-González attended the University of Arizona for her undergraduate degree and graduated Phi Beta Kappa. She earned a doctorate from Stanford University. Using the German Academic Exchange Service she was able to do research at four German universities about popular culture, gender, oral tradition.

== Academic career ==
Broyles-González is a professor and chair of the department of Social Transformation Studies at Kansas State University.

Her research in Germany resulted in her doctoral dissertation on the German response to Latin American literature and the reception of Argentine writer Jorge Luis Borges and Chilean poet Pablo Neruda (1979). Broyles-Gonzalez has written multiple books, which focus on empowering women and native heritage.

In 1991, began pressuring the University of California, Santa Barbara "to create the first Chicana/o studies doctorate program in the nation".

In May 1996, Broyles-González filed a lawsuit against the University of California Santa Barbara and its regents that challenged the unequal payment of women and minorities within the university. The lawsuit resulted in an order for the university to pay in excess of $100,000 in damages and attorney fees. In addition, the settlement contained a court order securing permanent future protection for Broyles-González against gender, race and political discrimination within the university.

In the early 2000s, Broyles-González worked in the Department of Mexican-American studies at the University of Arizona.

In 2013, Broyles-González was named head of the Department of Ethnic Studies at Kansas State University.

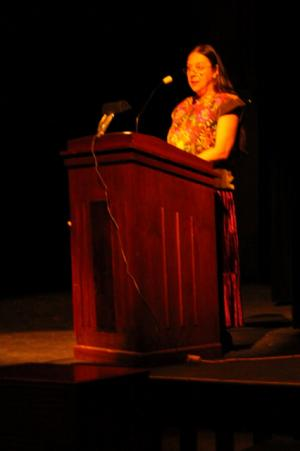
Yolanda Broyles-González

== Awards ==
In 1996, Broyles-González received the Lifetime Distinguished Scholar Award from the National Association for Chicana and Chicano Studies. This award recognizes her "multiple and invaluable scholarly contributions and her advocacy for the Chicana/o Studies discipline."

== Personal life ==
Broyles-González was married to musician Francisco González. The couple were co-authors on her 2022 book, Mario Barradas and Son Jarocho: The Journey of a Mexican Regional Music.

== Publications ==
=== Books ===
- El Teatro Campesino: Theater in the Chicano Movement. University of Texas Press. 1994.; focuses on women and performance.
- Broyles-González, Yolanda; Mendoza, Lydia (2001). Lydia Mendoza's Life in Music/La historia de Lydia Mendoza: norteño tejano legacies. American Musicspheres. New York: Oxford University Press. ISBN 978-0-19-512706-5.; focuses on Lydia Mendoza as a traditional performer of tejano music.
- Earth Wisdom: A California Chumash Woman ; focuses on Chumash elder Pilulaw Khus, who gives insights on tribal, environmental and human rights issues from a Native woman's perspective.
- Broyles-González, Yolanda; Figueroa Hernández, Rafael; González, Francisco (2022). Mario Barradas and Son Jarocho: The Journey of a Mexican Regional Music. Joe R. and Teresa Lozano Long series in Latin American and Latino art and culture (1st ed.). Austin: University of Texas Press. ISBN 978-1-4773-2555-1.

=== As editor ===
- Broyles-González, Yolanda, ed. (2001). Re-emerging native American women of the Americas: native Chicana Latina women's studies. Dubuque, Iowa: Kendall/Hunt. ISBN 978-0-7872-9521-9.; anthology focusing on Native American women focusing on her Yaqui heritage.

=== Chapters ===
- Broyles-Gonzalez, Yolanda (2002). "6. Indianizing Catholicism: Chicana/India/Mexicana Indigenous Spiritual Practices in Our Image". In Cantú, Norma E. (ed.). Chicana Traditions: Continuity and Change. Urbana, Ill.: Univ. of Illinois Press. ISBN 978-0-252-07012-9.
- Broyles‐González, Yolanda (2017-08-18). "The Powers of Women's Words: Oral Tradition and Performance Art". In Flores, Juan; Rosaldo, Renato (eds.). A Companion to Latina/o Studies (1 ed.). Wiley. pp. 116–125. doi:10.1002/9781405177603.ch10. ISBN 978-1-4051-2622-9.

=== Articles ===
- "The Living Legacy of Chicana Performers: Preserving History through Oral Testimony". Frontiers: A Journal of Women Studies. 11 (1): 46–52. 1990. doi:10.2307/3346703. ISSN 0160-9009.
- "Performance Artist María Elena Gaitán: Mapping a Continent without Borders (Epics of Gente Atravesada, Traviesa, y Entremetida)". Frontiers: A Journal of Women Studies. 24 (2/3): 87–103. 2003. ISSN 0160-9009.
