= Gloria Amescua =

American poet

- Born: Austin, Texas
- Citizenship: American
- Education: University of Texas at Austin (BA, MEd)
- Occupations: Writer, poet, educator
- Notable work: "Windchimes" and "What Remains"

Gloria Amescua is a Latina and Tejana writer from Austin, Texas. Amescua is most known for her poetry chapbooks, "Windchimes" and "What Remains." She won Lee and Low's Award Honor (2016) for her picture book manuscript in verse originally titled: Luz Jiménez, No Ordinary Girl. Her most recent book is Child of the Flower-Song People: Luz Jiménez, Daughter of the Nahua, a picture book illustrated by Duncan Tonatiuh and published by Abrams Books for Young Readers in 2021.

== Early life and education ==
Amescua was born in Austin, Texas. Her father was born in Michoacán, Mexico. Her mother was Mexican-American. She has dedicated poems to her mother, including "Fall into the Fig," which appeared in Entre Guadalupe y Malinche: Tejanas in Literature and Art.

Amescua received her B.A. and Masters of Education from University of Texas at Austin, and began her career as an English teacher.

== Career ==
Amescua became a high school assistant principal and the Secondary Language Arts Curriculum Director for a school district in Texas. In 2013, she won the Austin International Poetry Festival Contest, the Austin Poetry Society Award, and the Christina Sergeyevna Award for poetry. She was chosen to receive the 2016 Lee and Low New Voices Award Honor for her poetry manuscript, Luz Jiménez, No Ordinary Girl. She is an inaugural member of CantoMundo, a national Latinx poetry community. Additionally, she is a member of the Austin, Texas chapter of the Society of Children’s Book Writers and Illustrators, and an alumna of Hedgebrook's Writers-in-Residence program.

Her most recent book, Child of the Flower-Song People: Luz Jiménez, Daughter of the Nahua, features a Nahua woman who overcomes various cultural obstacles through her experience as a teacher and art muse in Mexico. In 2022, it received three International Latino Book Awards: Alda Flor Ada Best Latino Focused Children’s Picture Book Award – English (Gold); Best Educational Children’s Picture Book – English (Gold); and Most Inspirational Children’s Picture Book – English (Bronze). It was also named as a Junior Library Guild Gold Standard Selection, a 2021 School Library Journal Best Books for Nonfiction, a 2022 Pura Belpré Children's Author Award Honor Book, a 2022 SCBWI Golden Kite finalist for Nonfiction Text for Younger Readers, a 2023 Rise: Feminist Book Project Top Ten, and winner of the 2022 Américas Award along with the book's illustrator, Duncan Tonatiuh.

As of 2017 she has been a workshop presenter for youth and adults in Austin, Texas.

== Publications ==
Amescua's work has appeared in several publications:

- Acentos Review (2012);
- Texas Poetry Calendar (2013);
- di-verse-city (2000-2016);
- Kweli Journal (2014);
- Generations Literary Journal (2011);
- Texas Poetry Calendar (2013-2016);
- Pilgrimage Magazine (2014);
- Lifting the Sky Southwestern Haiku & Haiga (2010);
- Bearing the Mask: Southwestern Persona Poems (2016);
- The Crafty Poet II: A Portable Workshop (2016);
- Entre Guadalupe y Malinche: Tejanas in Literature and Art (2016)
- Abuelita's Song (2025)

== Bibliography ==
- Child of the Flower-Song People: Luz Jiménez, Daughter of the Nahua (Abrams, 2021)

== Sources ==
- Hernández-Ávila, Inés, and Norma Elia Cantú, eds. Entre Guadalupe Y Malinche: Tejanas in Literature and Art. Austin: U of Texas, 2016. Print.
- "Society of Children's Book Writers and Illustrators The International Professional Organization for Writers and Illustrators of Children's Literature." SCBWI Texas-Austin. N.p., 2017. Web. March 9, 2017.
- "Success Story Spotlight with Gloria Amescua." Writing Barn. N.p., February 17, 2017. Web. March 9, 2017.
