= Carmen Tafolla =

American writer (born 1951)

Dr. Carmen Tafolla
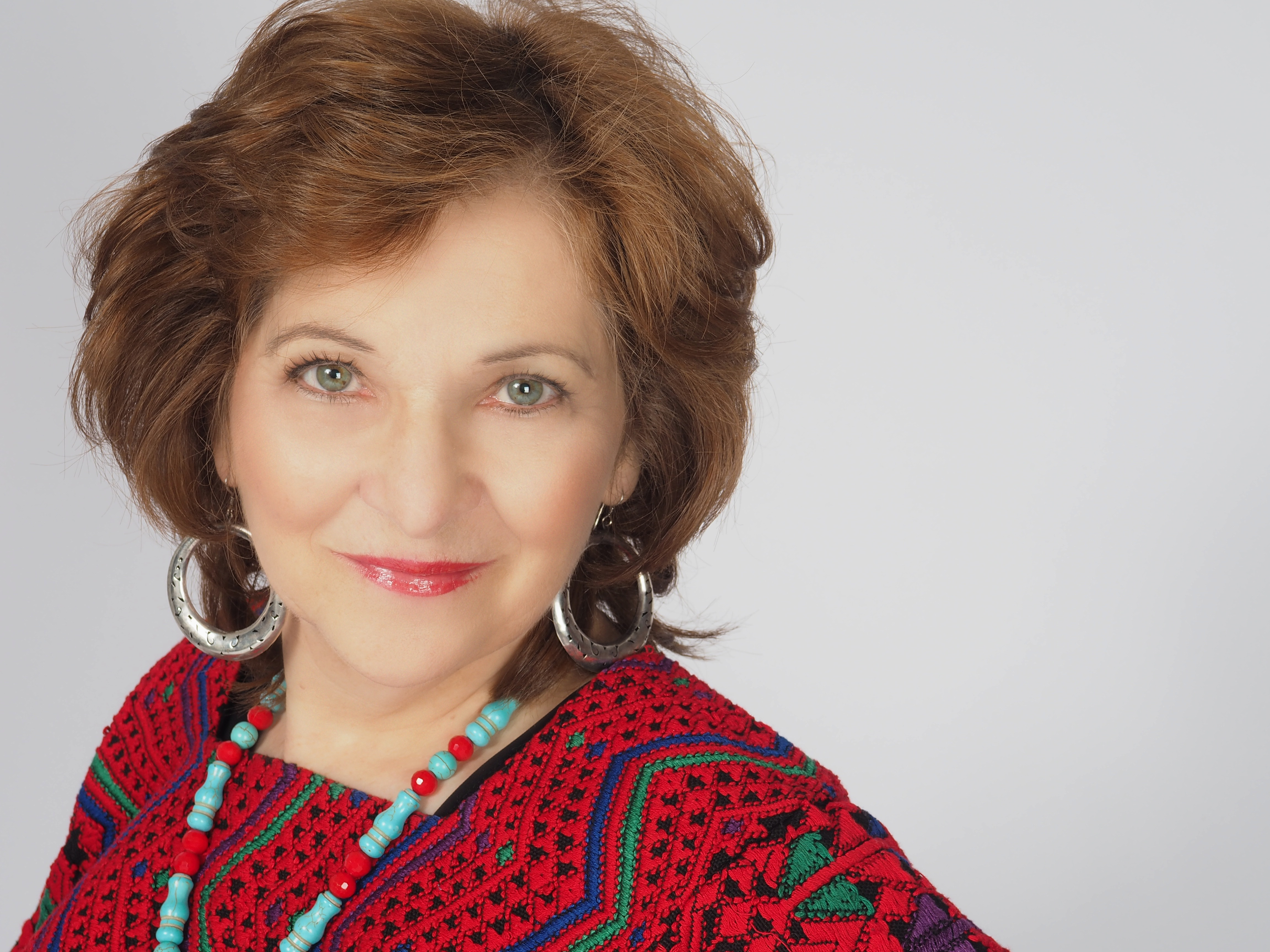
- Born: July 29, 1951 (age 75); San Antonio, Texas, U.S.
- Occupations: Novelist; poet
- Writing career
- Language: English; Spanish
- Genres: Children's literature; poetry
- Notable awards: State Poet Laureate of Texas; 2015
- Website: www.carmentafolla.net

Carmen Tafolla (born July 29, 1951) is an internationally acclaimed Chicana writer from San Antonio, Texas, and a professor emerita of bicultural bilingual studies at the University of Texas at San Antonio. Tafolla served as the poet laureate of San Antonio from 2012 to 2014, and was named the Poet Laureate of Texas for 2015–16. Tafolla has written more than thirty books, and won multiple literary awards. She is one of the most highly anthologized Chicana authors in the United States, with her work appearing in more than 300 anthologies.

== Early life and education ==
Tafolla was born in San Antonio, Texas, on July 29, 1951. She graduated from Austin College with a bachelor's degree in Spanish and French in 1972, and earned a master's degree in education from Austin College the following year. She pursued further graduate work at the University of Texas at Austin, earning a PhD in bilingual and foreign education in 1981. Tafolla has three children, and was married to Ernesto M. Bernal for 38 years until his death in 2017.

== Academic career ==
Tafolla served as the Director of the Mexican-American Studies Center at Texas Lutheran College, Seguin from 1973 to 1976, and from 1978 to 1979. She has served as Associate Professor of Women’s Studies at California State University, Fresno, as Special Assistant to the President for Cultural Diversity Programming at Northern Arizona University, has taught at numerous universities throughout the Southwest, and is currently Professor Emerita of Bicultural Bilingual Studies at the University of Texas at San Antonio.

== Poetry ==
Tafolla first drew the attention of the literary world as a poet, when she read some of her poetry at the Floricanto Festival in Austin, Texas in 1975. She published her first collection of poetry, Get Your Tortillas Together, with Reyes Cardenas and Cecilio Garcia-Camarillo the following year. Tafolla's poetry is heavily influenced by her ethnic background, and often focuses on Chicana characters, or on themes and images which are important to Chicano culture. Critics such as Yolanda Broyles-Gonzales have noted that Tafolla's female characters often display great inner strength, exhibiting what Broyles-Gonzales refers to as "an indomitable will to endure and survive" even in the most adverse situations. Tafolla’s poetry began as one of the early feminist voices in the Chicano Movement, and often focuses on themes, characters, and images richly imbedded in a Chicanx cultural setting. In addition, her works have touched on national and international issues with a pronounced emphasis on the affirmation and celebration of individual and cultural diversity and human value. Her works have been translated to numerous languages and have been published in English, Spanish, German, French, and Bengali. Her themes in both poetry and prose have ranged from cultural to socio-educational issues; have deepened feminist, ecological, and multicultural perspectives; have emphasized the indigenous roots of the Americas; and have challenged sexist, racist, classist, Eurocentric, and homophobic stereotypes. Often called one of the madrinas of Chicana literature, her early poetry gained her renown as a master of code-switching and featured the introduction of numerous “voice poems” which monologues later developed into a dramatic medley in her one-woman show. Her recent work has also included topics of immigration, age, death, grieving, environmental activism, and political resistance.

== Selected works ==
=== Poetry ===
- Get Your Tortillas Together, with Reyes Cardenas and Cecilio Garcia-Camarillo. 1976.
- Curandera M & A Editions, 1983. Illustrated by Thelma Ortiz Muraida.
- Curandera: 30th Anniversary Edition. Afterword by the author and a new Foreword by professor Norma E. Cantú. Wings Press, 2012.
- Rebozos, illustrated with paintings by Carolina Gárate, Wings Press, 2012.
- Sonnets to Human Beings, and Other Selected Works, Santa Monica, Calif.: Lalo Press, 1992. ISBN 9780961694166, OCLC 953428192
- Sonnets and Salsa, San Antonio: Wing Press, 2001. ISBN 9780930324568, OCLC 912565567
- This River Here: Poems of San Antonio, San Antonio, Texas: Wings Press, 2014. ISBN 9781609403997, OCLC 871228585
- Carmen Tafolla: New and Selected Poems, TCU,2015

=== Children's books ===
- Baby Coyote and the Old Woman / El coyotito y la viejita. Illustrated by Matt Novak. Wings Press, 2000.
- What Can You DO with a Paleta?, Berkeley: Tricycle Press, 2009. ISBN 9781582462899, OCLC 779204411
- What Can You DO with a Rebozo?, Berkeley: Tricycle Press, 2008. ISBN 9781582462707, OCLC 317296531
- That's Not Fair: Emma Tenayuca's Struggle for Justice, Wings Press, 2008
- Fiesta Babies, bilingual version: Cinco Punto Press (coming 2020)
- The Last Butterfly, Juventud Press/FlowerSong Press, 2021.
- I'll Always Come Back to You, Eerdman's Books, 2022
- Warrior Girl, Penguin 2023.
- Guerrera (Penguin, coming 2024)

=== Other works ===
- The Holy Tortilla and a Pot of Beans: A Feast of Short Fiction. Wings Press, 2008.
- To Split a Human: Mitos, machos, y la mujer chicana. Mexican American Cultural Center of San Antonio, 1975.
- A Life Crossing Borders: Memoir of a Mexican-American Confederate, English translation by Fidel Tafolla, Arte Público Press (Houston, TX), 2009. (Edited by Carmen Tafolla and Laura Tafolla)
- Arte del Pueblo: The OUtdoor Public Art of San Antonio, Eerdman's Books, 2022.

== Awards ==
Tafolla has received multiple literary awards:

- National Chicano Literary Contest, University of California Irivine. First Prize (1987) - Awarded for Sonnets to Human Beings.
- Tomás Rivera Mexican-American Award for Children’s Books (2009) - Awarded by the Texas State University College of Education for The Holy Tortilla and a Pot of Beans
- Américas Award for Children's and Young Adult Literature (2010). Awarded by the Consortium of Latin American Studies Programs (CLASP) for What Can You DO with A Paleta?
- Tomás Rivera Mexican-American Award for Children’s Books (2010) - Awarded by the Texas State University College of Education for What Can You DO with a Paleta?
- Charlotte Zolotow Award for Best Children's Picture Book (2010) - Awarded for What Can You DO with A Paleta?
