= Spoon River Poetry Review =

American literary journal

Spoon River Poetry Review (SRPR, ISSN 0738-8993) is an American literary journal of poetry based in Illinois during most of its existence. It publishes a combination of Illinois-connected, national, and international poetry. It began in 1976 as the Spoon River Quarterly, but dropped the "Quarterly" name in 1993. According to its official website, the journal has gained an international reputation and also conducts the Spoon River Poetry Review Editor's Prize and the Spoon River Poetry Association Poets-in-the-Schools Program. It has received several Illinois Arts Council awards. SRPR identifies itself as "one of the nation's oldest continuously published literary journals". In 1976, (Note: A 1992 article in The Pantagraph says 1974, but the websites run by SRPR editors Paichaske and Getsi both say 1976.) David Pichaske founded The Spoon River Quarterly at Western Illinois University, and its Spoon River Press was founded to publish the magazine and poetry chapbooks. In 1978, the operation moved to Peoria, Illinois, and formed a not-for-profit corporation. There being another press with a similar name in Peoria at the time, the poetry published incorporated as Spoon River Poetry Press, using that name for poetry publications, the imprint Ellis Press for prose. The organization became heavily supported by the Illinois Arts Council in the 1980s. In the mid-1980s, Paichaske moved to Minnesota, founding another not-for-profit, Plains Press, and soon gave over the Illinois not-for-profit and The Spoon River Quarterly to Illinois State University professor Lucia Getsi. Under Getsi, the journal switched from a regional flavor to a mix of regional, national and international works, accepting foreign-language works with English translations, and adding book reviews. The journal became biannual in 1990, and changed its name to Spoon River Poetry Review in 1993. Getsi retired in 2006, passing the editorship to Bruce Guernsey, Distinguished Professor Emeritus from Eastern Illinois University. In 2010, the operation returned to Illinois State University, this time with Kirstin Hotelling Zona, an Associate Professor of English, as editor; under her, SRPR added an interview with each issue's featured poet, as well a review essay.

The publication is named not after Spoon River Anthology, but after the Spoon River itself.

== See also ==
- List of literary magazines
