= Esperanza Rising =

2000 novel by Pam Muñoz Ryan

- Original Scholastic book cover
- Author: Pam Muñoz Ryan
- Illustrator: Joe Cepeda
- Cover artist: Pam Muñoz Ryan
- Language: English/Spanish
- Genre: Historical fiction
- Published: 2000 (Scholastic)
- Publication place: United States
- Media type: Print
- Pages: 259
- ISBN: 0-439-12041-1
- OCLC: 43487323
- LC Class: PZ7.R9553 Es 2000

Esperanza Rising is a young adult historical fiction novel written by Mexican-American author Pam Muñoz Ryan and released by Scholastic Press on March 27, 2000. The novel focuses on Esperanza, the only daughter of wealthy Mexican parents Sixto and Ramona, and follows the events that occur after her father's murder. Esperanza, her mother, and their former household servants flee to California with no money during the Great Depression, where they find low-paying agricultural work.

== Plot ==
Esperanza Ortega, the daughter of wealthy landowners, lives in Aguascalientes, Mexico, in 1930 on her family's ranch with her parents, grandmother, and servants. On the day before Esperanza's 13th birthday, her father, Sixto, and his cowboys are killed by bandits while working on the ranch. At her birthday party, Esperanza receives a doll, her last gift from Sixto. Esperanza's step-uncle, Luis, reveals that he now owns their land, and offers to continue to care for the Ortega family and their ranch if Esperanza's mother, Ramona, marries him. When Ramona refuses, Luis burns down the ranch. The fire injures Esperanza's grandmother, Abuelita, who is sent to a convent where she can recover. Esperanza and the rest of her family decide to flee to the United States with their former servants. When Esperanza's family arrives in the United States, which is currently in the grip of the Great Depression, they settle in a farm camp in Arvin, California. Esperanza struggles to adjust to her new life.

In a dust storm, Ramona contracts Valley fever, and the doctors are unsure if she will survive. Esperanza, desperate for money to support herself and pay her mother's medical bills, takes work on the farm camp despite being underage. She stockpiles money orders in the hopes of one day sending them to Abuelita and allowing her to travel to the state of Oklahoma.

Tensions rise in the camp as migrants from Oklahoma flee the Dust Bowl and look for work in California. Some workers go on strike to try to improve working conditions. Following a massive demonstration by the strikers, the farm owners call immigration officials to round up and deport the demonstrators. However, many of the people deported were natural-born American citizens who have never been to Mexico. Esperanza is distressed and has an argument with Miguel, the son of her former servant, because of this event. The next day, they find that Miguel has left to seek work over in Northern California.

When Ramona recovers from her illness, Esperanza proudly goes to show her mother the money orders she saved, only to discover that they are missing; Miguel secretly stole Esperanza's earnings to return to Mexico and retrieve Abuelita.

The book ends on the day of Esperanza's 14th birthday, and she has finally learned to be grateful for her family reunited, friends who love her, and most of all, hope. (Esperanza means "hope" in Spanish.)

== Characters ==
- Esperanza Ortega: The protagonist and main character, the 13-year-old daughter of wealthy Mexican landowners, who spends most of the novel living in poverty in California. She is named after the author's grandmother, Esperanza Ortega Muñoz Hernandez Elgart.
- Ramona Ortega: Esperanza's mother, Sixto's wife, and Abuelita's daughter. She is grateful for what she has, and tries to get Esperanza to be more grateful.
- Miguel Lopez: The son of the Ortegas' servants.
- Sixto Ortega: Esperanza's father, Ramona's husband, Abuelita's son-in-law, and Tio Luis' stepbrother.
- Abuelita: Esperanza's grandmother, Ramona's mother, and Sixto's mother-in-law.
- Tio Luis: Esperanza's step-uncle, Sixto's stepbrother and Ramona's stepbrother-in-law who tries to marry her after Sixto's death. He burns down the ranch after Ramona rejects him.
- Tio Marco: Tio Luis' brother, and Sixto Ortega's stepbrother.

== Background information ==
When writing Esperanza Rising, Muñoz Ryan took inspiration from the story of her grandmother, Esperanza Ortega Muñoz Hernandez Elgart, whom the book's protagonist was named after.

The Great Depression, which began a year before the start of the novel, caused approximately 800,000 people to move from the Midwest to California, hoping to get jobs and escape poverty. Like Esperanza and her family, many of the migrants were professionals who competed for low-paying jobs. It was during the Great Depression when a few hundred thousand to two million were deported to Mexico. As many as sixty percent of the deportees were actually American citizens.

== Critical reception ==
Along with its Best Books citation, Publishers Weekly gave Esperanza Rising a starred review, citing its "lyrical, fairy-tale-like style". It praised the way "Ryan poetically conveys Esperanza's ties to the land by crafting her story to the rhythms of the seasons" and the fact that "Ryan fluidly juxtaposes world events... with one family's will to survive". Kirkus Reviews disliked the "epic tone, characters that develop little and predictably, and... romantic patina". However, it also found that the "style is engaging, her characters appealing", ultimately saying that the story "bears telling to a wider audience".

Children's Literature praised Esperanza Rising and suggested that it "would be a great choice for a multicultural collection". Esperanza Rising coincides with other works of its kind to portraying themes of the United States' simultaneous discrimination against and economic reliance on immigrants. According to literary scholar Dr. Rachelle Kuehl, historical fiction like Esperanza Rising serves to connect readers with the past and present, facilitating a co-construction of current and historical Mexican-American experiences. She notes that the novel allows students to confront the realities of discrimination due to skin tone and immigration status, and she praises the book for its cultural authenticity.

The book has been incorporated into school curriculum in literature, social studies, and Spanish. When the book was used with English as a Second Language students in an Earphone English group at Berkeley High School, they found that Esperanza Rising appealed students who, like Esperanza, have emigrated from Mexico, along with "those who have moved here after losing their fathers to violence in the former Yugoslavia".

=== Awards ===
- The 2001 Jane Addams Children's Book Award
- The 2001 WILLA Literary Award for Children's/Young Adult Fiction
- The 2001 Judy Lopez Memorial Award for Children's Literature
- The 2001 Judy Goddard/Libraries Ltd. Young Adult Book Award
- The 2002 Pura Belpré Award

== Graphic novel ==
In 2027, Esperanza Rising will be adapted into an authorized graphic novel illustrated by Andrés Vera Martínez.
