= Tomás Rivera Award =

Literary award recognizing Mexican American children's books

Tomás Rivera Book Award
- Awarded for: Honor authors and illustrators who create literature that depicts the Mexican American experience
- Location: San Marcos, TX
- Country: United States
- Presented by: Texas State University College of Education
- First award: 1996
- Website: education.txstate.edu/ci/riverabookaward

The Tomás Rivera Mexican American Children's Book Award recognizes authors and illustrators whose literary work depict the Mexican American experience. This award was established in 1995 by the Texas State University College of Education in honor of distinguished alumnus, Tomás Rivera an educator, poet and author of literary works depicting the difficulties experienced by Mexican migrant farmers and also the first Mexican American to hold a chancellor position at the University of California.

== Criteria ==
- The book is written for children and young adults (0–16 years).
- The text and illustrations are of the highest quality.
- The portrayal/representations of Mexican Americans are accurate and engaging, avoid stereotypes, and reflect rich characterization.
- The book may be fiction or non- fiction.

== Recipients ==
Tomás Rivera Book Award Winners
| Year | Category | Author | Illustrator | Title |
|---|---|---|---|---|
| 2025 | For Younger Readers | Laekan Zea Kemp | Beatriz Gutíerrez Hernández | Desert Song |
| 2025 | For Older Readers | Aida Salazar | | Ultraviolet |
| 2024 | For Younger Readers | Michael Genhart | John Parra | Spanish is the Language of My Family/El Español es la Lengua de Mi Familia |
| 2024 | For Middle Readers | Carmen Tafolla | | Warrior Girl |
| 2024 | For Older Readers | Pedro Martín | Pedro Martín | Mexikid: A Graphic Memoir |
| 2023 | For Younger Readers | Celia C. Pérez | | Tumble |
| 2023 | For Older Readers | Aida Salazar | Karina Perez | A Seed in the Sun |
| 2022 | For Younger Readers (tie) | David Bowles | Erika Meza | My Two Border Towns |
| 2022 | For Younger Readers (tie) | Yuyi Morales | Yuyi Morales | Bright Star |
| 2022 | For Older Readers | Daniel Aleman | | Indivisible |
| 2021 | For Younger Readers (tie) | Duncan Tonatiuh | Duncan Tonatiuh | Feathered Serpent and the Five Suns: A Mesoamerican Creation Myth |
| 2021 | For Younger Readers (tie) | Beatrice Zamora | Maira Meza | The Spirit of Chicano Park/El espíritu del Parque Chicano |
| 2021 | For Older Readers | Sonia Gutiérrez | | Dreaming with Mariposas |
| 2020 | | Isabel Quintero | Zeke Peña | My Papi Has A Motorcycle |
| 2019 | For Younger Readers | Yuyi Morales | Yuyi Morales | Dreamers |
| 2019 | For Older Readers | David Bowles | | They Call Me Güero |
| 2018 | For Younger Readers | Xelena González | Adriana M. Garcia | All around Us |
| 2018 | For Older Readers (Middle Grade) | Celia C. Pérez | | The First Rule of Punk |
| 2018 | For Older Readers (Young Adult) | Erika L. Sánchez | | I Am Not Your Perfect Mexican Daughter |
| 2017 | For Younger Readers | Isabel Campoy and Theresa Howell | Rafael López | Maybe Something Beautiful: How Art Transformed a Neighborhood |
| 2017 | For Older Readers | Francisco X. Stork | | The Memory of Light |
| 2016 | For Younger Readers | Duncan Tonatiuh | Duncan Tonatiuh | Funny Bones: Posada and His Day of the Dead Calaveras |
| 2016 | For Older Readers | Ashley Hope Pérez | | Out of Darkness |
| 2015 | For Younger Readers | Duncan Tonatiuh | Duncan Tonatiuh | Separate is Never Equal: Sylvia Méndez and her Family's Fight for Desegregation |
| 2015 | For Older Readers | Isabel Quintero | | Gabi, a Girl in Pieces |
| 2014 | For Younger Readers | Duncan Tonatiuh | Duncan Tonatiuh | Pancho Rabbit and the Coyote: A Migrant's Tale |
| 2014 | For Older Readers | Susan Goldman | | Diego Rivera: An Artist for the People |
| 2013 | | Guadalupe García McCall | | Under the Mesquite |
| 2012 | For Older Readers | Winifred Conkling | | Sylvia and Aki |
| 2012 | For Younger Readers | Duncan Tonatiuh | Duncan Tonatiuh | Diego Rivera: His World and Ours |
| 2011 | | Alex Sánchez | | Bait |
| 2010 | | Carmen Tafolla | Magaly Morales | What Can You Do With a Paleta? |
| 2009 | | Carmen Tafolla | | The Holy Tortilla and a Pot of Beans |
| 2009 | | Benjamin Alire Sáenz | | He Forgot to Say Goodbye |
| 2008 | | Marisa Montes | Yuyi Morales | Los Gatos Black on Halloween |
| 2007 | | Juan Felipe Herrera | | Downtown Boy |
| 2006 | | Susanna Reich | Raúl Colón | José! Born to Dance |
| 2005 | | Pam Muñoz Ryan | | Becoming Naomi León |
| 2004 | | Yuyi Morales | Yuyi Morales | Just a Minute: A Trickster Tale and Counting Book |
| 2003 | | Pat Mora | Beatriz Vidal | A Library for Sor Juana |
| 2002 | | Francisco Jiménez | | Breaking Through |
| 2001 | | Amada Irma Pérez | Maya Christina Gonzalez | My Very Own Room/Mi Propio Cuartito |
| 2000 | | Rudolfo Anaya | Amy Córdova | My Land Sings: Stories of the Río Grande |
| 1999 | | Bobbi Salinas | Bobbi Salinas | The Three Pigs/Los Tres Cerdos: Nacho, Tito, and Miguel |
| 1998 | | Pat Mora | Raúl Colón | Tomás and the Library Lady |
| 1997 | | Carmen Lomas Garza | Carmen Lomas Garza | In My Family/En Mi Familia |
| 1996 | | Rudolfo Anaya | Edward Gonzales | The Farolitos of Christmas |
| 1996 | | Gary Soto | Susan Guevara | Chato's Kitchen |
