= Nicholtown =

- Community
- Nicholtown in Greenville
- Coordinates: 34.8403956°N 82.3712319°W
- Country: United States
- State: South Carolina
- County: Greenville
- City: Greenville

Nicholtown is a predominantly African-American community in Greenville, South Carolina. Jacqueline Woodson's award-winning adolescent novel, Brown Girl Dreaming (2014) was based on recollections of her childhood in Nicholtown.
