= Show Way =

Book by Jacqueline Woodson

- Front cover, designed by Hudson Talbott
- Author: Jacqueline Woodson
- Illustrator: Hudson Talbott
- Language: English
- Genre: Non-fiction
- Publisher: Putnam Juvenile
- Publication date: 2005
- Publication place: United States
- Media type: Print
- Pages: 48
- ISBN: 978-0399237492

Show Way is a 2005 children's picture book by American author Jacqueline Woodson with illustrations by Hudson Talbott. The book was made into a film in 2012 by Weston Woods Studios, Inc., narrated by the author. It recounts the stories of seven generations of African Americans and is based on the author's own family history. Show Way was a John Newbery Medal Honor Book in 2006 and was featured in Reading Rainbow that same year in the series finale.

== About the author ==
Woodson has received numerous awards for her middle-grade and young adult books, which include being a National Book Award Finalist and winning the Coretta Scott King Award and the Los Angeles Times Book Prize for Miracle's Boys.

== Plot ==
Show Way is a story about ancestry. The author (Jacqueline Woodson) is telling a story about her ancestors to her daughter. Woodson tells her about their past and how they all had their own "Show Way." Every piece of quilt starting from Soonie's great grandmother had a significant meaning. When Soonie's great-grandmother made the quilts, the pieces signified roads, moons, and stars to follow, a way to escape their slavery. Soonie's grandmother was sold into slavery, and she made clothes for everyone in the big house, even for slaves. At night she sewed stars, and moons, and roads into quilts, each piece a picture signifying what to follow to find the north star; her own show way. Mathis Soonie's grandmother married a slave, who died before meeting his baby girl, a girl-child born free in 1863. Years later—Soonie came. Soonie and her mother grew up on a land where they'd pick cotton and got paid little and a piece of ground to farm on. They called this land home and they shared this land with other free people. On this land they worked hard, from pink day to blue-black nights, but it was a free life nevertheless; at the end of the day they could find a thing or two to smile about. Soonie made patch pieces with stars and moons and roads; sewed fields and rivers and trees. She patched these pieces together so her mother could sell them come market day. She called her creation "Trail to the North" she also called them "Show Way." They no longer needed the secret trail to the north, but rather they lived well off of the money those quilts brought in, her own show way. She married a man named Walter Scott who owned land in Anderson, South Carolina; she had a baby and named her Georgiana. Georgiana was born a reader, and they said about her that she always had a book in her hand; she grew up to teach a small school in Anderson. She had two daughters named Caroline and Ann, these two girls walked in a line to change the laws that kept black and white people living separate. They sometimes were scared but regained their confidence when they saw the show way patches that their grandmother Soonie had pinned inside their dresses. Ann grew up to be a poet, which sometimes she converted to song, and Caroline stitched those songs into art for people to buy and hang up on their walls. Ann had the author, Jacqueline Woodson, who grew up to read and write, but when she could not write, she sewed stars and moons and roads because her mother told her that everything that happened before Woodson was born was her own kind of show way. Woodson's writing turned into books where she told stories of other people's show ways, a story which she enjoys repeating to her daughter.

== Characters ==
- Soonie's Great Grandmother - When she was only seven she was sold from the Virginia land to a plantation in South Carolina with only some muslin her ma gave her, two needles from the big house, and thread dyed bright red with berries from the chokecherry tree. She jumped broom with a young man named Ensler. She had a baby and named her Mathis May.
- Mathis May - Soonie's Grandmother, When Mathis May was seven she got sold away. At night she sewed stars and moons and roads. The patches and pieces she put together were a show way, patterns showing how to get to free land. She jumped broom with another slave. The slave was killed, never to meet his daughter, born free that same year 1863.
- Soonie - Soonie lived on free land with her mother, working hard to make a life, but a free life all the same. Soonie married a man named Walter Scott, and together they had a daughter, which they named Georgiana.
- Georgiana - Georgiana grew up to teach at a small school in Anderson. She had two daughters at once and named them Caroline and Ann.
- Caroline - Caroline and her sister grew up to walk in the line to end segregation. Caroline stitched Ann's songs into art that people bought to hang up on their walls.
- Ann - Ann and her sister grew up to walk in the line to end segregation. Ann grew up writing poems which sometimes she made into songs. Ann was the mother of Jacqueline Woodson, the Author.
- Jacqueline Woodson - When Jacqueline was seven she didn't have to walk freedom lines, or work in fields. She grew up and wrote every day. And those words became books that told stories of many people's show ways.
- Toshi Georgiana - Daughter of Jacqueline to which she told the stories of her ancestors to.

== Critical Review ==
Critics have many good things to say about Show Way. Barbara Z Kiefer and Dennis Price say that "Show Way is an exquisite patchwork of words and images." Publishers Weekly stated that Show Way is "Both historical and deeply personal."Black Issues Book Review said that Show Way was, "Beautifully written and a treat for the eyes." Mary N. Oluonye of School Library Journal stated that Show Way is "An outstanding tribute, perfectly executed in terms of text, design, and illustration." Kirkus Reviews says that Show Way "Takes a difficult subject and makes it accessible to young readers. One of the most remarkable books of the year."

== Awards ==
John Newbery Medal Honor Book 2006

== See also ==
- 2005 in literature
- Children's Literature
