= E. B. Lewis (illustrator) =

American artist and illustrator (born 1956)

- Born: Earl Bradley Lewis; December 16, 1956 (age 69); Philadelphia, Pennsylvania
- Education: Temple University
- Occupations: Artist, illustrator, professor
- Writing career
- Genre: Children's picture books
- Subject: African American studies
- Notable works: The Other Side; Preaching to the Chickens: The Story of Young John Lewis; Talkin' About Bessie: The Story of Aviator Elizabeth Coleman
- Notable awards: Caldecott Honor Award; 2004; Coretta Scott King Award; 2013, 2003, 2000, 1999
- Website: eblewis.com

Earl Bradley Lewis (born December 16, 1956) is an American artist and illustrator. He is best known for his watercolor illustrations for children's books such as Jacqueline Woodson’s The Other Side and Jabari Asim’s Preaching to the Chickens: The Story of Young John Lewis.

Lewis has been awarded prizes for his illustrations including the 2016 New York Times Best Illustrated Book Award for Preaching to the Chickens: The Story of Young John Lewis and the 2005 Caldecott Honor Award for Jacqueline Woodson's Coming on Home Soon.

Lewis draws inspiration from his uncles, who particularly influenced his love of art. He often speaks on his challenges as a young student and how that shaped his passion for teaching and the emotional layers to his art, which often connect to history. E.B. Lewis studied illustration, graphic design and art education at the Tyler School of Art at Temple University. He then continued to build his art business while also teaching. Throughout his career, he has developed a unique watercolor style that has allowed him to collaborate on over 70 children's books.

Lewis now teaches at the Pennsylvania Academy of Fine Arts in Philadelphia, holds private workshops, and has had work on display around the country since 1985.

== Personal life ==
Earl Bradley Lewis was born on December 16, 1956, in Philadelphia, Pennsylvania.

Early life

Lewis explains his childhood as one surrounded by a community that valued education and loved life. The first five years of his life, he was raised by his grandparents. Lewis struggled with learning challenges as a young boy, explaining how he failed third grade and would often get in trouble in school. He was once laughed at as a child for saying he wanted to be a lawyer, and from this instance, he wanted to make something of himself. Lewis credits his artistic inspiration to two of his uncles, one of whom would drive him to his early art experiences every week. He says that there was always real art around his house and that his uncle introduced him to his passion, art. Lewis explains the importance of finding your tribe as a child, and for him this struggle ended in finding art. He then attended the School of Art League at Temple University on Saturday mornings as a sixth-grader.

Education

Lewis attended the Tyler School of Art at Temple University where he developed a love for watercolors. At Temple, Lewis majored in illustration, graphic design and art education. In college, Lewis learned about the ways and paths to take to make money through illustration. He said he was not prepared for this business side of art, and therefore, he fell back on his graphic design experience and teaching degree. He began teaching as a substitute teacher for middle and high school. Later in his career, he went back to school to earn his Master's in Special Education. As of 2026, alongside his fine art painting and illustration works, Lewis teaches at the Pennsylvania Academy of Fine Arts. He also sits on the board of the Philadelphia Watercolor Club.

== Career ==
Early Career

Lewis secured his first permanent position at Woodhaven working with children. He then pivoted to become an industrial art teacher. He taught art for twelve years in public schools and at the Trenton Psychiatric Hospital. Shaped by his early educational experiences, Lewis encourages art exposure for children and has a love for helping and teaching children. He began to receive attention for his art from various museums and galleries. Through this exposure, he met contacts to help with shows and framing and began to have exhibitions in 1985 and 1986.

Career

Lewis' career as an illustrator of children's books took off in 1992 when his watercolors in Artist Magazine were noticed by Elizabeth O’Grady and Jeff Dwyer. They had ties to an art director from Simon & Schuster who was seeking African American artists to illustrate children's books. Shortly after, Lewis quit his teaching job and began illustrating for his first collaboration with Jane Kurtz's Fire On The Mountain.

In 2003, a collection of Lewis’ original watercolors from the first fifty children's books he illustrated was purchased by The Kerlan Collection at the University of Minnesota. His work is also in private collections throughout the United States. As of April 2026, he sits on the board of the Hall of Fame of Children's Book Writers and Illustrators and is a member of The Society of Illustrators in New York City.

Style

Lewis's choice of medium is watercolor, but he makes sure they have the same depth and density as oil paintings. He takes a very research-focused approach, with great attention to detail and emphasis on the drawing phase. His process involves photographing the subject and planning what the other details will look like based on the pictures. He calls himself an “artistrator”. He intertwines aspects of culture and history into his art, sometimes using the art to make commentary or statements on current situations. Lewis says that if a project that he is working on takes place in a specific place, he will go to that place to photograph and observe the subject. He says that in this style, he is “writing with pictures”. Lewis also only accepts books and projects that feel right and positive to him. He describes himself as an emotional person, sometimes painting with tears in his eyes, but uses this as a strength in his approach to connect with his art.

== Works ==
E.B. Lewis has illustrated more than seventy books for children.

His illustrations include these well-known books among many others:

- Talkin' About Bessie: The Story of Aviator Elizabeth Coleman by Nikki Grimes
- Down the Road by Alice Schertle
- My Rows and Piles of Coins by Tolowa M. Mollel
- The Bat Boy and His Violin by Gavin Curtis
- My Best Friend by Mary Ann Rodman
- The Other Side by Jacqueline Woodson
- Each Kindness by Jacqueline Woodson
- I Want to Be Free by Joseph Slate
- The Walk by Winsome Bingham
- Because of Winn-Dixie by Kate DiCamillo
- This Little Light of Mine by E.B. Lewis
- Preaching to the Chickens by Jabari Asim
- Dark Was the Night by Gary Golio

One book, Circle Unbroken, written by Margot Theis Raven, was later set to the music of the late composer William Grant Still and performed in 2007 by members of Chamber Music Charleston for educational performances. The Negro Speaks of Rivers by Langston Hughes is one of his most well-known collaborations. His illustrations accompany each line of the poetry with powerful and emotional images. Coming on Home Soon by Jacqueline Woodson is another notable work by Lewis. His style and use of light captures the story that Woodson is telling.

== Awards and honors ==
- 1996 ALA Notable Children's Book Award for Alice Schertle's Down the Road
- 1999 - Coretta Scott King Illustrator Honor for The Bat Boy and His Violin by Gavin Curtis
- 2002 Notable Book for the Language Arts Award for Jacqueline Woodson's’ The Other Side
- 2003 - Coretta Scott King Illustrator Award Winner for Talkin’ About Bessie: The Story of Aviator Elizabeth Coleman by Nikki Grimes.
- 2004 Caldecott Honor Award Winner, Jacqueline Woodson's Coming on Home Soon
- 2005 - Caldecott Honor Award for Coming on Home Soon by Jacqueline Woodson
- 2006 - Charlotte Zolotow Award for My Best Friend by Mary Ann Rodman
- 2009 - Orbis Picture Award Winner for The Secret World of Walter Anderson by Hester Bass
- 2013 - Charlotte Zolotow Award Winner for Each Kindness by Jacqueline Woodson
- 2016 - New York Times Best Illustrated Book Award, Kirkus Best Illustrated Book Award, and the Golden Kite Honor Award for Preaching to the Chickens: The Story of Young John Lewis by Jabari Asim.
