= Miracle's Boys =

- DVD cover showing the main characters of Miracle's Boys (from left to right): Laf, Ty'ree and Charlie Bailey
- Genre: Drama
- Starring: Pooch Hall; Sean Nelson; Julito McCullum
- Composer: Bud'da
- Country of origin: United States
- Original language: English
- No. of seasons: 1
- No. of episodes: 6 (+1 special)

Production
- Executive producers: Nikki Silver; Orly Wiseman; David McCourt
- Producer: Leslie D. Farrell
- Cinematography: Cliff Charles
- Editors: K.A. Chisholm; Geeta Gandbhir; Kathryn Moore; Juantxo Royo
- Production company: Noggin LLC

Original release
- Network: The N (Noggin)
- Release: December 17, 2004 – February 20, 2005

Miracle's Boys is an American drama television miniseries produced for Noggin's teen programming block, The N. The show began production in June 2004 and first previewed on December 17, 2004, with a behind-the-scenes special called "The Making of a Mini-Series." The show made its official debut on February 18, 2005.

It is based on the 2000 novel of the same name by Jacqueline Woodson. The series was directed by Spike Lee, Ernest Dickerson, Neema Barnette, Bill Duke, and LeVar Burton. It was filmed on-site in Harlem, New York, and includes a theme song by rapper Nas.

Miracle's Boys was nominated for five different categories at the 2006 Black Reel Awards, and it was the recipient of a Writers' Guild of America Award for Best Children's Script. The entire series was released to DVD in the United States on November 8, 2005. TeenNick, a channel that combined Noggin's The N with Nickelodeon's TEENick, aired reruns of Miracle's Boys throughout 2012.

== Synopsis ==
The series follows the lives of two teenage boys and their older brother, who has to take responsibility for the boys after their parents die. The eldest Bailey brother, twenty-one-year-old Ty'ree (Pooch Hall), is a mail room manager at a publishing company. He was accepted into MIT prior to the events of the show, but declined the acceptance to raise his younger brothers. Charlie (Sean Nelson), the fifteen year old middle brother, has just gotten out of a juvenile detention facility and is mad at the universe. Once an avid pet lover and baseball fanatic, life behind bars has changed him. Lafayette (Julito McCullum), the youngest Bailey brother at age fourteen, loves and breathes baseball. However, his game has been out of sync since his mother's death. He goes on to play in a championship game, in which he faces an all-star team from Greenwich Village. The series follows the boys through the hardships of growing up on their own.

== Cast ==
=== Main cast ===
- Pooch Hall as Ty'ree
- Sean Nelson as Charlie
- Julito McCullum as Lafayette

=== Supporting cast ===
- Jorge Posada and Tiki Barber as Baseball Coaches
- Jordan Puryear as Angelina
- Sasha Toro as Tamara
- Nancy Ticotin as Miracle

== Episodes ==
No.	Title	Directed by	Written by	Original release date
Special	"Miracle's Boys: The Making of a Mini-Series"	Spike Lee	Kevin Arkadie & Stephen Langford & Dawn Urbont	December 17, 2004
A behind-the-scenes look at the making of the show. The cast and crew is shown filming on location in Harlem, and they explain how they made the show feel like "real life."
1	"New Charlie"	Spike Lee	Kevin Arkadie & Stephen Langford & Dawn Urbont	February 18, 2005
Charlie comes home after being released from the Rahway Boys Home.
2	"In the Game of Life"	Ernest R. Dickerson	Kevin Arkadie & Stephen Langford & Dawn Urbont	February 18, 2005
Charlie becomes part of the troublemaking crowd at school.
3	"Who's to Blame?"	Neema Barnette	Kevin Arkadie & Stephen Langford & Dawn Urbont	February 19, 2005
Laf throws a party that quickly goes out of control.
4	"Miracle's Song"	Bill Duke	Kevin Arkadie & Stephen Langford & Dawn Urbont	February 19, 2005
Ty'ree becomes overwhelmed with his responsibilities as Charlie and Laf's caretaker.
5	"Free Day"	LeVar Burton	Kevin Arkadie & Stephen Langford & Dawn Urbont	February 20, 2005
Laf tries to tell Angelina about his feelings for her.
6	"Bond of Brothers"	Spike Lee	Kevin Arkadie & Stephen Langford & Dawn Urbont	February 20, 2005
The family is brought together when Charlie recalls his time in jail.

== Awards and nominations ==
Year	Award	Category	Recipient	Result
2006	Black Reel Awards	Best Supporting Actress	Jordan Puryear	Nominated
2006	Black Reel Awards	Best Supporting Actor	Sean Nelson	Nominated
2006	Black Reel Awards	Best Screenplay, Original or Adapted - Television	Kevin Arkadie, Stephen Langford, and Dawn Urbont	Nominated
2006	Black Reel Awards	Best Film - Television	Miracle's Boys	Nominated
2006	Black Reel Awards	Best Director - Television	Spike Lee, Ernest Dickerson, Neema Barnette, Bill Duke, and LeVar Burton	Nominated
2006	Writers' Guild of America Award	Children's Script - Episodic & Specials	Miracle's Boys	Won
