= Jane Kurtz =

American writer (born 1952)

- Born: April 17, 1952 (age 74); Portland, Oregon, U.S.
- Education: Monmouth College, BA; University of North Dakota, MA
- Occupation: Writer
- Writing career
- Language: en-us
- Notable works: Fire on the Mountain, E. B. Lewis (illustrator); River Friendly River Wild, Neil Brennan (illustrator)
- Notable awards: Kerlan Award, Golden Kite Award, IBBY-iRead Outstanding Reading Promoter Award
- Website: janekurtz.com

Jane Kurtz (born April 17, 1952) is an American writer of more than forty picture books, middle-grade novels, nonfiction, ready-to-reads, and books for educators. A member of the faculty of the Vermont College of Fine Arts MFA in children's and adult literature, Kurtz is an international advocate for literacy and writing. She was also part of a small group of volunteers who organized the not-for-profit organization, Ethiopia Reads, which has established more than seventy libraries for children, published books, and built four schools in rural Ethiopia.

== Early life ==
Kurtz was born in Portland, Oregon, to missionary parents, who moved the family to Ethiopia when she was two years old. Her parents, the Reverend Harold and Pauline (Polly) Kurtz, worked for the Presbyterian Church in Ethiopia for twenty-three years.

After two years of language study in Addis Ababa, Ethiopia, her parents moved their four children to Maji, Ethiopia in the country's far southwest. The journey up to Maji—usually in a Jeep—took all day to drive thirty-two miles. Sometimes the family traveled by mule, a two-day trip. Maji, at 8000 feet altitude, was where Jane first learned to read as Polly Kurtz homeschooled Kurtz and her sisters.

The family spent one year in Boise, Idaho when Kurtz was in second grade. After returning to Ethiopia, Kurtz was home schooled for one additional year before leaving Maji to attend fourth grade at Good Shepherd boarding school in Addis Ababa. She would remain at Good Shepherd through her junior year of high school, except for spending her eighth-grade year in Pasadena, California. One of her middle-grade novels, Jakarta Missing (Greenwillow/HarperCollins), is the fictional story of what it was like to leave East Africa to spend a teenage year in the United States.

Following in her parents' footsteps, Kurtz was admitted to Monmouth College (Illinois) after her junior year of high school and graduated in 1973 as a psychology major. At the time of graduation ceremonies, she was involved in a crash of a small plane piloted by her father, while visiting her family in Ethiopia. She spent about six months in a body cast before beginning her work life.

In Carbondale, Illinois, she worked at the Carbondale New School, a private alternative school for students in kindergarten through sixth grade, first as a writing teacher, next as director, and finally teaching a combined class of third- and fourth-graders. When her husband, the Reverend Leonard Goering, accepted a position in Trinidad, Colorado, she spent five years teaching English at Trinidad Catholic High School. She also served as the director of a not-for-profit organization, Trinidad Downtown Area Development, and was a member of the Colorado Council on the Arts before moving to Grand Forks, North Dakota, where she completed her master's degree in English from the University of North Dakota and taught in the English department where she is now Faculty Emerita.

== Professional writing career ==
Years spent reading and discussing books and writing with young people encouraged Kurtz to try to publish her own stories. Her first picture book, I’m Calling Molly (Albert Whitman), was inspired by watching her son interact with a next-door neighbor.

For her second picture book, Fire on the Mountain (Simon & Schuster), Kurtz began to reach back to the stories of her childhood in Ethiopia. Fire on the Mountain was the first picture book illustrated by E.B. Lewis who went on to illustrate more than seventy books for children and to win the Coretta Scott King Illustrator Award and Caldecott Honor Award. Fire on the Mountain received a starred review, was a Children's Book of the Month Club selection, and has remained in print for more than twenty years.

Kurtz's first middle-grade novel, The Storyteller's Beads (Harcourt), is an attempt to show what life was like in Ethiopia during the time of "red terror" after her family moved back to the United States. Her goal was to evoke the realities of children encountering conflict and the danger of war. The novel is based on real-life events in Ethiopia after Christianity, Islam, and Judaism (Beta Israel) were all put under intense political pressure in Ethiopia during the 1970s and 1980s and many Ethiopians fled to refugee camps in the Sudan. From there, thousands of the Beta Israel were flown to Israel in air lifts with striking nicknames such as Operation Moses and Operation Joshua. Kurtz has written that she was moved to begin drafting the story after reading eyewitness accounts of some of those who made the journey.

She has also written picture books about the beauty of Ethiopia, including Water Hole Waiting (Greenwillow/HarperCollins), co-authored by her brother Christopher Kurtz. Another book co-authored with her brother is Only a Pigeon (Simon & Schuster), a true story of a shoeshine boy who became friends with her brother when Christopher Kurtz returned to Ethiopia as a young adult to teach in a girls’ school in Addis Ababa.

In 1997, Kurtz returned to Ethiopia after having been away for twenty years. That spring, she was invited to conduct author visits at the International Community School, Bingham Academy, and Sandford International School. After completing the author visits, she traveled to Lalibela and Gondar, a trip that would later lead to Kurtz's writing of a historical fiction middle-grade novel for American Girl, Saba: Under the Hyena's Foot, set in 1846 when Gondar was in decline as the Ethiopian capital.

When she returned to North Dakota, she was only home a few days before she and her family had to leave their house that was in the first neighborhood to be evacuated during the 1997 Red River flood. They spent six weeks in Walhalla, North Dakota, during which time Kurtz flew to Atlanta to be part of a presentation at the International Reading Association, speaking about the power of encouraging children to capture their real lives through the rhythms and imagery of poetry, a practice she began at the Carbondale New School and continued during years of Writer in the Schools projects.

Shortly after returning to clean up the house she and her own children had lived in since they had moved to Grand Forks, she created what became the picture book River Friendly River Wild (Simon & Schuster), the text of which won the Golden Kite Award from the Society of Children's Book Writers and Illustrators. Kurtz also drew on her flood memories for tornado scenes in her 2013 novel Anna Was Here (Greenwillow/HarperCollins). She often describes that novel as "a story of life's big questions and a few puny answers." A reviewer in the New York Times called it "sweetly funny" and "a moving-day classic, destined to sidestep its boxed-up brethren for the important job of steadying someone's shaky little hands."

Kurtz has been invited to speak in forty states of the United States and in various countries in Europe, Africa, the Middle East, and Asia. Her presentations are often praised for their wittiness, their ability to connect with young writers, and their emphasis on the life-changing power of reading. She was also invited to be part of "Laura Bush Celebrates America's Authors," a day of literacy celebration prior to U.S. President George W. Bush's 2001 inauguration, during which fourteen children's book authors were honored and then conducted presentations in Washington D.C. schools.

In April 2008, when Kurtz was performing author visits in Indonesia and Cambodia, she was contacted by an editor at American Girl about writing two books to be sold with Lanie, American Girl Doll of the Year 2010. Inspired by the students at Pasir Ridge International School in Palikpapan, Indonesia, who provide support for the Borneo Orangutan Survival Foundation, Kurtz created a secondary character, Dakota, Lanie's best friend, who goes to Indonesia and works with orangutans. In 2011, Kurtz returned to the Pasir Ridge International School to show the students the book that had been partially inspired by them. One student wrote, "I would like to help animals, but I can’t help these." He then listed his favorites and the reasons he couldn't help them. A seal? Too far. A snake? Too scary. A lion? Too strong. A penguin? Too far. He concluded that he had been inspired to catch krill, an important part of the food web, and ended, "Even poor people can help animals."

Kurtz wrote the books Lanie and Lanie's Real Adventures while she was living in Lawrence, Kansas, where her son and daughter-in-law were attending college at the University of Kansas. She decided to create a character who engages in citizen science to help save monarch butterflies after reading about Monarch Watch, a cooperative network of students, teachers, volunteers and researchers based in Lawrence.

== Major works ==
- I'm Calling Molly with illustrations by Irene Trivas (picture book) 1990
- Ethiopia: The Roof of Africa (juvenile nonfiction) 1991
- Fire on the Mountain with illustrations by E. B. Lewis (picture book) 1994, Simon & Schuster, ISBN 978-0-671-88268-6
- Pulling the Lion's Tail with illustrations by Floyd Cooper (picture book) 1995
- Miro in the Kingdom of the Sun with illustrations by David Frampton (picture book) 1996
- Only a Pigeon with Christopher Kurtz; illustrations by E. B. Lewis (picture book) 1997
- Trouble with illustrations by Durga Bernhard (picture book) 1997
- The Storyteller's Beads with illustrations by Michael Bryant (juvenile novel) 1998
- I'm Sorry, Almira Ann with illustrations by Susan Havice (juvenile novel) 1999, (Henry Holt)
- Faraway Home with illustrations by E. B. Lewis (picture book) 2000, Harcourt Children's Books, ISBN 978-0-15-200036-3
- River Friendly, River Wild with illustrations by Neil Brennan (picture book) 2000
- Jakarta Missing (juvenile novel) 2001
- Water Hole Waiting with Christopher Kurtz; illustrations by Lee Christiansen (picture book) 2001
- Rain Romp: Stomping Away a Grouchy Day with illustrations by Dyanna Wolcott (picture book) 2002
- Bicycle Madness with illustrations by Beth Peck (juvenile novel) 2003
- Memories of Sun: Stories of Africa and America editor (short stories and poetry) 2003, Greenwillow/Amistad, ISBN 978-0-06-051051-0
- Saba: Under the Hyena's Foot with illustrations by Jean-Paul Tibbles (young adult novel) 2003, Pleasant/American Girl, ISBN 978-1-58485-829-4
- The Feverbird's Claw (young adult novel) 2004
- Johnny Appleseed with illustrations by Mary Haverfield (easy reader) 2004, Simon and Schuster
- Mister Bones: Dinosaur Hunter with illustrations by Mary Haverfield (easy reader) 2004
- Do Kangaroos Wear Seat Belts? with illustrations by Jane Manning (picture book) 2005, Dutton, ISBN 978-0-525-47358-9
- In the Small, Small Night with illustrations by Rachel Isadora (picture book) 2005, Greenwillow/Amistad, ISBN 978-0-06-623814-2
- What Columbus Found: It Was Orange, It Was Round with illustrations by Paige Billin-Frye (easy reader) 2007
- Martin's Dream (easy reader) 2008
- Anna Was Here (middle-grade novel) 2013
- Celebrating Ohio: 50 States to Celebrate with illustrations by C.B. Canga (picture book) 2015
- Celebrating Pennsylvania: 50 States to Celebrate with illustrations by C.B. Canga (picture book) 2015
- Celebrating New Jersey: 50 States to Celebrate with illustrations by C.B. Canga (picture book) 2015
- Celebrating Georgia: 50 States to Celebrate with illustrations by C.B. Canga (picture book) 2015
- Planet Jupiter (young adult novel) 2017

== Awards ==
- 2001, Golden Kite Award, (for best picture book text) by the Society of Children's Book Writers and Illustrators
- 2001, Best-of-the-Year Award, by School Library Journal for Water Hole Waiting
- 2005, Year's Best Books and Year's Best Children's Books, by The Washington Post for In the Small, Small Night
- 2010, Book of the Year, by American Girl for Lanie's Real Adventures
- 2011, Kerlan Award, by the University of Minnesota
- 2014, SEED Honor, for being a collaborative founder of Ethiopia Reads, 23rd Annual SEED Awards by the Society of Ethiopians Established in Diaspora
- 2015, Nominated for the 2015–2016 South Carolina Children's Book Awards, for Anna Was Here
- 2022, IBBY-iRead Outstanding Reading Promoter Award by the United States Board on Books for Young People
