= Kevin Noble Maillard =

American professor and children's author

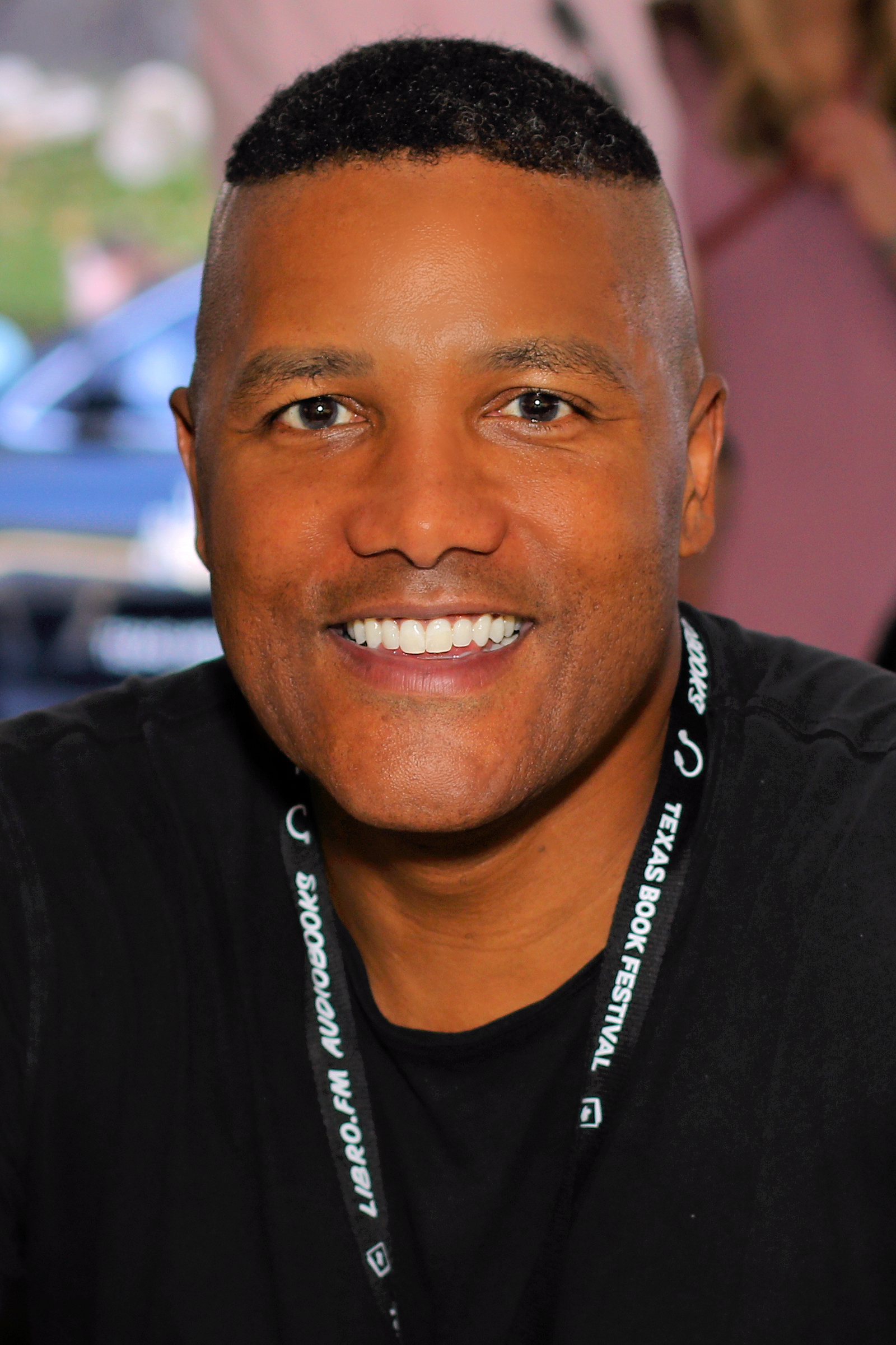
Maillard at the 2025 Texas Book Festival

Kevin Noble Maillard is an American professor of law at Syracuse University, and the author of the award-winning children's picture book Fry Bread: A Native American Family Story.

== Education ==
Maillard has B.A. in public policy from Duke University, a Juris Doctor degree from the University of Pennsylvania Law School, and a Ph.D. in political science from the University of Michigan.

== Biography ==
Maillard is a member of the Seminole Nation of Oklahoma.

== Books ==
Maillard's 2019 picture book Fry Bread: A Native American Family Story (illustrated by Juana Martinez-Neal) was awarded the 2020 Robert F. Sibert Informational Book Medal, and was the honor book in the 2020 American Indian Youth Literature Awards. Roaring Brook Press released his second picture book, And They Walk On (illustrated by Rafael López), on October 14, 2025.

== See also ==
- Frybread
