= David McCourt =

Irish-American entrepreneur

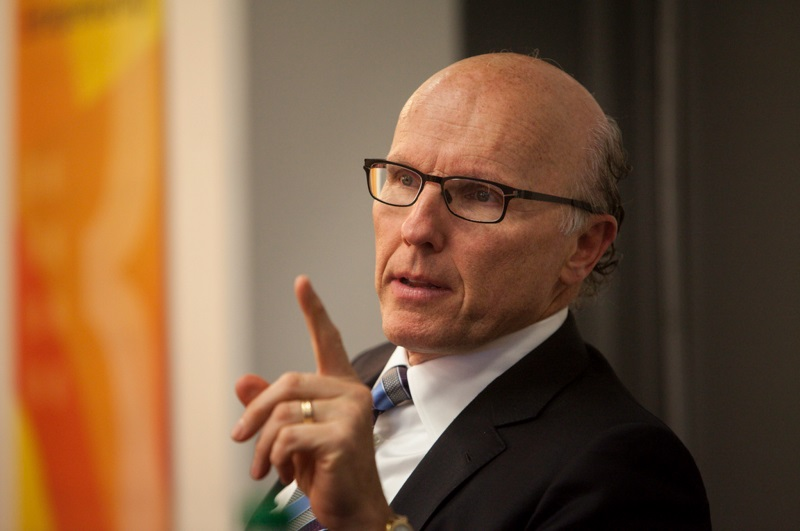
- Chairman and founder of Granahan McCourt Capital
- Education: Georgetown University
- Occupation: Entrepreneur

David McCourt is an Irish-American entrepreneur with experience within the telecom and cable television industries. He was an early contributor to the development of transatlantic fiber networks and has founded or bought over 20 companies in nine countries.

== Early life and education ==
McCourt grew up in Boston, Massachusetts. He is a graduate of Georgetown University. Upon graduation, he worked for 18 months as a probation officer's aide in a Washington D.C. neighbourhood.

== Career ==
After working with the probation officer in Washington D.C., McCourt founded his first company, McCourt Cable Systems, operating as a designer and builder of cable networks. The company grew to be the largest privately owned designer and builder of cable systems in the US. This venture led to him forming the first competitive telephone network in America, Corporate Communications Network. This company was merged with Metropolitan Fibre Systems (MFS) creating MFS McCourt. MFS was later sold for $14.3 billion to MCI Worldcom.

In 1985, McCourt built the first independent TV station on the Caribbean Island of Grenada, Discovery TV.

McCourt's next venture collaborated with engineering and construction firm Peter Kiewit Sons, Inc. From this partnership emerged McCourt Kiewit International, based in London, which became the largest designer and builder of residential cable television and telephone networks in Europe.

McCourt was responsible for bringing the first competitive telephone and TV landscape to Mexico. He also brought traditional waiting times for land line phones down from one year to less than thirty days .

In 1993, he acquired control of a publicly traded company C-TEC Corporation. He spent four years selling subsidiaries to grow the business. In 1997, McCourt split C-TEC into three publicly traded companies - RCN Corporation, Cable Michigan, Inc. and Commonwealth Telephone Enterprises, Inc. and served as the CEO for all of them.

McCourt was chief executive officer and chairman of RCN Corporation until its bankruptcy in 2004 following 23 consecutive quarterly losses and $4 billion of total losses.

McCourt later turned his attention to TV and film, taking various production roles. In 2005, he won an Emmy for the series Reading Rainbow, a long running children's show that encourages reading. McCourt also produced Miracle's Boys directed by Spike Lee on Nickelodeon's new teenage network. He served as executive producer on the ten-part documentary series "What's Going On?" which documented the impact of global conflict on children around the world. In 2025, it was announced that he would produce a new documentary, Amerigo, in association with South Florida PBS and American Public Television (APT) marking the 250th anniversary of American independence.

In 2013, as the chairman and CEO of the investment firm Granahan McCourt, McCourt led a consortium of companies which included Oak Hill Advisers, as well as the family of Walter Scott Jr., to acquire the Irish Fibre Company, Enet. Its network is used by over 70 telecommunication operators providing broadband to millions of people across Ireland. McCourt acquired another Irish telecom operator, Airspeed Telecom, in 2014 for an undisclosed amount. At this point, McCourt and his partners had invested more than €100m in Irish Operations.

Granahan McCourt took a controlling stake in internet video company Narrowstep Inc in 2006. McCourt became chairman and CEO and led a $10.5 million equity financing for the company in 2007.

In 2016, McCourt announced the first Public Private Partnership (PPP) in the Kingdom of Saudi Arabia following the Vision 2030 reform plans outlined by deputy crown prince Mohammed bin Salman, seeking to open up opportunities for foreign investment. Through his ownership of Skyware Technologies, McCourt also operates global manufacturing facilities in key territories including China, where he has set up multiple strategic partnerships.

McCourt has launched several digital technology platforms and is the technology partner for sports content platform Dugout. In June 2016, McCourt launched ALTV.com, a digital TV platform. His investments also include a phone app called Findyr, a crowd sourcing technology invention.

As the owner and chairman of National Broadband Ireland, in November 2019, McCourt signed contracts with the Irish government to deliver the country's €5 billion National Broadband Plan. Globally, this will be the single largest investment ever in telecommunication infrastructure by government intervention to revitalise rural communities and stop the creation of socio-economic divide. It is the biggest investment in Ireland since rural electrification.

In November 2024, five years on from the initial contract signing of the National Broadband Plan, The Department of the Environment, Climate and Communications published its first independent evaluation report conducted by EY, which found that the National Broadband Plan is delivering widespread direct and indirect benefits for businesses, homeowners and rural and underserved communities. The National Broadband Plan has been credited by Minister of State Ossian Smyth as being on time, on budget and having credible evidence that the project is delivering higher benefits that expected.

McCourt is the author of the book 'Total Rethink: Why Entrepreneurs Should Act Like Revolutionaries', published by Wiley. The book became a Wall Street Journal best-seller in 2019. McCourt has also been a regular commentator providing editorials to international newspapers including the Financial Times and the Wall Street Journal.

== Awards and honors ==
- Won an Emmy Award for the children's series Reading Rainbow
- First award from President Ronald Reagan.
- First 'Economist in Residence' at the University of Southern California (USC) Annenberg School for Communication and Journalism.
- Selected as "Entrepreneur of the Year" by Ernst & Young LLP.
- Named "Top Entrepreneur" by the Harvard Business School Club of New York.
- Won gold medal from the American Irish Historical Society.
- Received an award for Outstanding Alumni Entrepreneur from Georgetown University.
- Named the inaugural Executive in Residence for Entrepreneurial Economics and Innovation from Georgetown University.
- Received the Science Foundation Ireland annual medal for outstanding contribution to technology and innovation.
- Honorary Doctorate Degree in Economic Science from University College Dublin for contribution to technology and innovation.
- Member of the Council on Foreign Relations.
- Recognized by the Tip O’Neill Diaspora Awards for outstanding services to Ireland.

== Personal life ==
McCourt resides in rural Ireland and Florida.
