= The Year We Learned to Fly =

2022 picture book by Jacqueline Woodson and Rafael López

- First edition
- Author: Jacqueline Woodson
- Illustrator: Rafael López
- Language: English, Spanish
- Genre: Picture book
- Publisher: Nancy Paulsen Books
- Publication date: January 4, 2022
- Publication place: United States
- Pages: 32
- ISBN: 978-0-399-54553-5
- Preceded by: The Day You Begin

The Year We Learned to Fly is a children's picture book written by Jacqueline Woodson and illustrated by Rafael López. Told in verse, the story is about two Black siblings, who use their imagination to escape their boredom. The book was published on January 4, 2022, by Nancy Paulsen Books and is a follow-up to the authors' previous collaboration, The Day You Begin.

== Reception ==
The picture book was received positively, gaining starred reviews from multiple publications. Kirkus Reviews, which summarized the book as "[a]n intergenerational family story of freedom", praised López' illustrations, such as the contrast between the indoor and outdoor scenes, and said "[t]he ebullient mixed-media artwork explodes with color and extends the richness of the text." Kirkus also commented on the reference to Virginia Hamilton's The People Could Fly made by the authors.

The Booklist praised the narrative, calling it "simultaneously simple and profound" and commented on how the book could be used to give confidence to children during challenging points in their lives. In their review, Publishers Weekly highlighted López' multimedia illustrations and how they worked alongside the poems to vividly depict the children's imagination.

The Year We Learned to Fly was shortlisted for the 2022 Kirkus Prize in the "Young Readers' Literature" category.
