= Rafael López (illustrator and artist) =

Mexican-American illustrator and artist (born 1961)

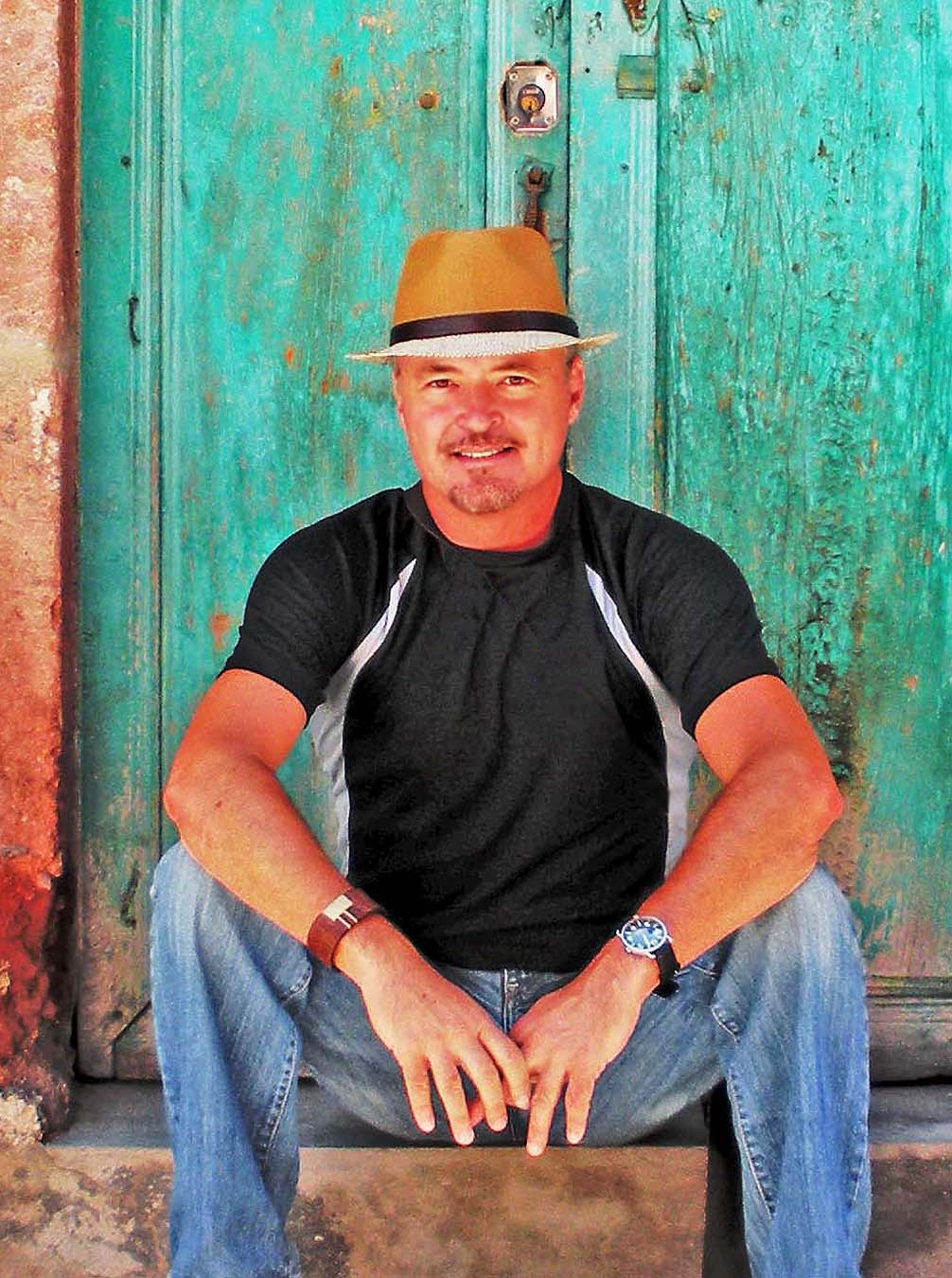
- Born: August 8, 1961 (age 65); Mexico City, Mexico
- Spouse: Candice López
- Awards: American Library Association Pura Belpré Medal; American Library Association Schneider Family Book Award; Society of Illustrators New York Original Art Silver Medal; Tomás Rivera Award; International Latino Book Awards; Jane Addams Children's Book Award; Américas Book Awards; National Cartoonist Society Book Illustration Award

Rafael López (born August 8, 1961) is an internationally recognized illustrator and artist. To reflect the lives of all young people, his illustrations bring diverse characters to children's books. As a children's book illustrator, he has received three Pura Belpré Award medals from the Association for Library Service to Children (ALSC), a division of the American Library Association (ALA), and REFORMA in 2020 for Dancing Hands: How Teresa Carreño Played the Piano for President Lincoln, Drum Dream Girl in 2016 and Book Fiesta! in 2010. He created the National Book Festival Poster for the Library of Congress and was a featured book festival speaker at this event.

His book illustrations are the recipient of the American Library Association Schneider Family Book Award, Silver Medal from the Society of Illustrators New York, Original Art Exhibition, the Jane Addams Children's Book Award and the Tomás Rivera Book Award along with three Pura Belpré honors and two Américas Book Awards.

López has illustrated thirteen stamps for the United States Postal Service and served as the first Guest Artist of the Smithsonian National Postal Museum. In 2023, he created a Google Doodle celebrating the life of trailblazing Mexican American media pioneer and civil rights activist Raoul A. Cortez, who gave a voice and presence to Latinos through radio and television. The artist was selected by the Obama/Biden campaign to create two official posters at Artists for Obama in an effort to secure the pivotal Latino vote in key swing states.

== Education ==
In Mexico City, López attended the Manuel Bartolome Cossio, an experimental Freinet school where he began drawing and painting at an early age. He attended after school workshops there in photography, painting, puppet making, carpentry, ceramics, tablas huicholas and theatre. In school he was able to study classical music and also learned to play a variety of folkloric instruments including the quena, guitar and drums taught by members of Los Folkloristas. Music is a prominent theme found in his illustrations, books and postal stamps. Both his parents were architects and professors at UNAM. As a child, he often visited the flea market with his father looking for used books and the family had a large collection that lined the walls of their home from floor to ceiling. López regularly traveled by metro over an hour to visit the library, immersed himself in books, especially art books and grew up with a fascination for images from a variety of cultures. The illustrator describes Mexico as a place where there are hundreds of myths and legends as well as 67 native languages. This early exposure to diversity and storytelling shaped his thinking. When he was 10 years old, his parents sent him to Exeter, England to live with Mexican-born conceptual and performance artist Felipe Ehrenberg. There, he explored drawing and learned to make books and use a printing press. His first book was an illustrated journal where he recorded his experiences to share with his family. In 1982, he left Mexico to study illustration at the ArtCenter College of Design, in Los Angeles where he graduated with a Bachelor of Fine Arts degree in Illustration.

== Career ==
After college he worked as an illustrator in Los Angeles, and then converted an old car garage in an industrial loft building in the East Village of downtown San Diego into his home and studio. He became involved in social design projects, founding the Urban Art Trail and painting large-scale murals to improve blighted areas and reclaim neighborhoods. A lifelong passion for books eventually led him to pursue children's book illustration with a focus on diversity and inclusion. He has taught illustration for ArtCenter College of Design and San Diego City College. In 2025, López received the Distinguished Mid-Career Award from ArtCenter College of Design, recognizing his leadership in using art to inspire social change. . The award highlighted his commitment to equity, his storytelling on behalf of underrepresented communities, and his integration of these themes into both large-scale public murals and children’s literature. That same year, López also served as the commencement speaker for ArtCenter College of Design’s Winter graduation ceremony.

== Works ==
Book Fiesta! illustrated by Rafael López, recipient of the 2010 Pura Belpré illustration medal.

Nuestra Voz poster, 2008.

Growing up in Mexico City, Rafael López was immersed in the rich cultural heritage and native color of street life. Influenced by Mexican surrealism and myths he developed a style with roots in this tradition. Using bold colors, his textured work is a fusion of graphic style and magical symbolism. López likes to find objects and symbols to communicate concepts. The illustrator is inspired by imagery from different cultures where he gathers ideas to inform the visual language of his works. He paints with acrylic paints that come in large recycled salsa jars from Mexico and uses a variety of objects to scratch textures onto hand-cut and sanded wooden boards. Color and texture is important to Lopez's paintings and he uses a camera to catalogue the colors, textural history of walls and peeling paint to fuel his work. López believes color is an expression of his identity, heritage and a direct route to the emotions of his audience. He cites Mexico as a land of contrasts, surrealism, intense color, texture and imagery . Strongly influenced by indigenous cultures and naïve art, his illustrations for children's books have been cited for their folk art quality. He has created artwork for international clients like Amnesty International, Apple, Atheneum Books for Young Readers, Charlesbridge Publishing, Chicago Tribune, the Grammy Awards, Harper Collins, Henry Holt & Company, Houghton Mifflin Harcourt, IBM, Intel, Lee & Low Books, Library of Congress, Little, Brown and Company, Los Angeles Times, Penguin Books, Scholastic, The New York Times, United States Forest Service, United States Postal Service, the Washington Post and the World Wildlife Fund. His work has been selected into multiple juried shows. Illustrations have been featured in publications like Communication Arts, the American Illustration Annual, and Graphic Design USA.

== Books ==
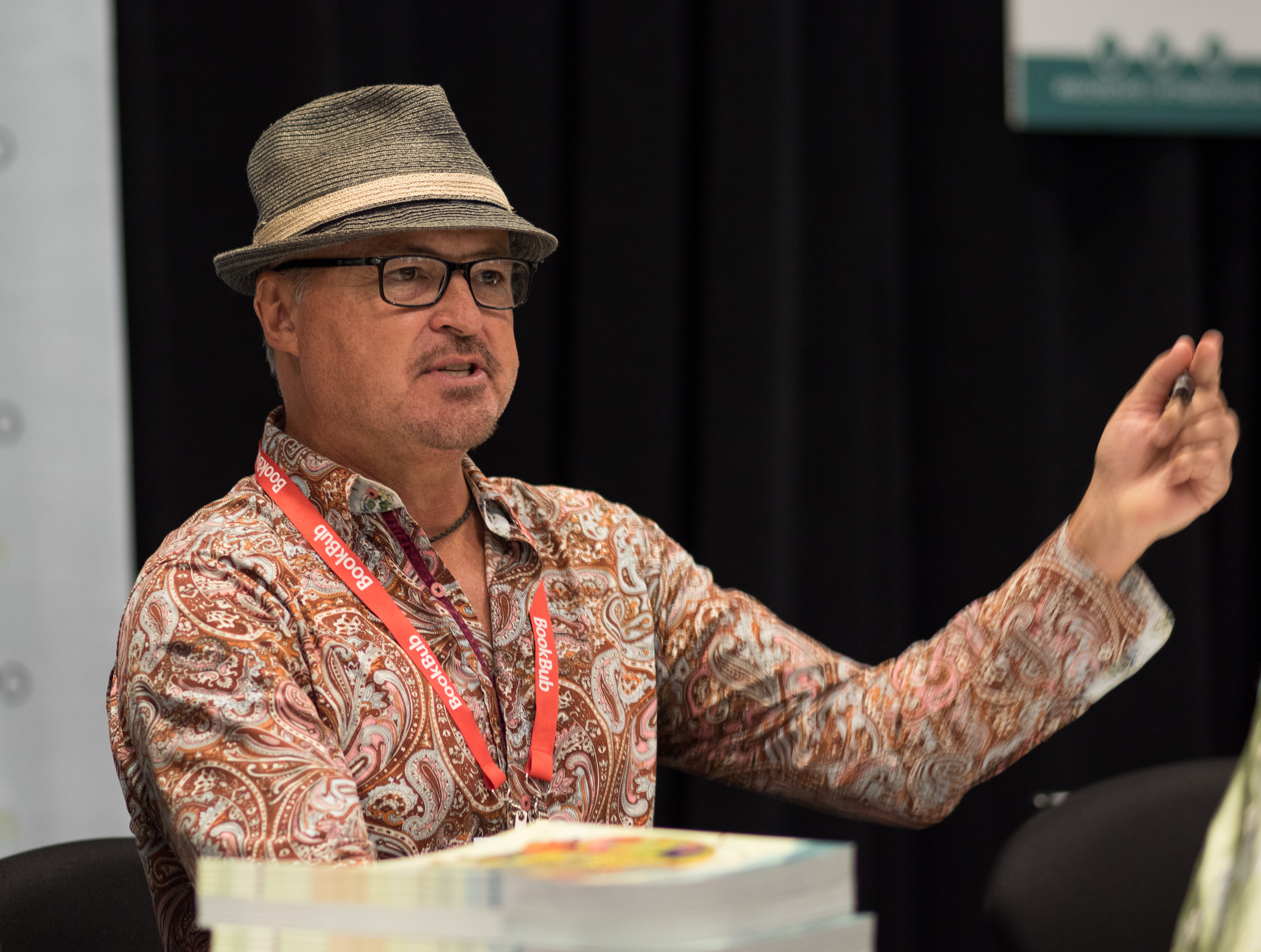
Lopez talking with a fan at BookExpo America in 2018

Released in 2025, And They Walk On was written by Kevin Noble Maillard and illustrated by Rafael López. The book tells the story of a boy who must say farewell to someone he loves, finding comfort in the belief that she continues walking on. Cited as stunning and essential, the book is a portrayal of loss and hope that earned a star from Kirkus Reviews. López created illustrations for The Little Book of Joy in 2022, written by His Holiness the Dalai Lama and Archbishop Desmond Tutu. The illustrator shows two leaders of global peace who had very different childhoods, faced oppression and struggle yet learned to look for joy. Lopez's collaboration with Jacqueline Woodson on The Day You Begin, resulted in a #1 New York Times Children's Picture Book bestseller and received the Jane Addams Children's Book Award that recognizes books that engage children in thinking about peace, social justice, global community, and equity. In 2020, Netflix featured The Day You Begin, read aloud in an episode of their series Bookmarks: Celebrating Black Voices. The story about finding courage to connect, even when you are afraid was commissioned as a musical and world premiered at the Kennedy Center. In 2022, López collaborated again with Jacqueline Woodson to create The Year We Learned to Fly. This story of a brother and sister facing challenges with confidence became a New York Times Bestseller in children's picture books.

Lopez's illustrations for Just Ask! Be Different, Be Brave, Be You written by Supreme Court Justice Sonia Sotomayor focuses on disabled kids who use their strengths to work together on a garden. The book became a #1 New York Times Bestselling Children's Picture Book, winning the American Library Association 2020 Schneider Family Book Award. Justice Sotomayor had a childhood diagnosis of diabetes and in their NPR interview, López talked about being inspired by his own son who has autism.

López received the 2020 Pura Belpré Medal for illustration from the American Library Association for Dancing Hands: How Teresa Carreño Played the Piano for President Lincoln. The book tells the story of a Venezuelan child pianist who writes and performs music during the American Civil War. His illustrations for Drum Dream Girl were the recipient of the 2016 Pura Belpré medal for illustration given by the American Library Association to honor work that best portrays, affirms and celebrates the Latino cultural experience in children's books. Rafael López's illustrations were animated by Dreamscape Media to create Drum Dream Girl: How One Girl's Courage Changed Music, the recipient of the 2017 Andrew Carnegie Medal for excellence in children's video. Written by Margarita Engle the book tells the story of Millo Castro Zaldarriaga, a mixed race Cuban girl in the 1930s music scene, who defied gender roles. His illustrations encourage readers to explore the story from different perspectives by changing the page orientation from horizontal to vertical. The use of perspective in Drum Dream Girl has a surreal quality and the illustrator has related his perception that children are more visually sophisticated than adults think, so he often uses abstract shapes, instead of realistic representations of objects. Drum Dream Girl was selected as part of a special initiative by We Need Diverse Books as part of Indies First celebrations on small business Saturday.

The book Bravo! Poems about Amazing Hispanics. was awarded the 2017 Silver Medal by the Society of Illustrators New York, Original Art Exhibition. The bright, large scale portraits of notable Hispanics were described as having the graphic discipline of poster art.

In 2019, López collaborated on a tribute book, celebrating 50 years of Sesame Street in "Sunny Day: A Celebration of the Sesame Street Theme Song. Together with Eric Carle, renowned author and illustrator of "The Very Hungry Caterpillar", he collaborated on the 2017 book "What's your Favorite Color?".

His illustrations for Book Fiesta! written by Pat Mora were the recipient of the 2010 Pura Belpré Illustration Award. The book is a celebration of El Día de los niños/ El Día de los libros, Day of the Child/Day of the Book. The book "Maybe Something Beautiful, How Art Transformed a Neighborhood" written by F. Isabel Campoy and Theresa Howell received the 2017 Tomás Rivera Book Award for Young Readers, and is based on López's work as a community muralist. Additional books, Tito Puente, Mambo King by Monica Brown,The Cazuela that the Farm Maiden Stirred by Samantha Vamos,My Name is Celia, Me Llamo Celia written by Monica Brown and Yum! Mmm! Que Rico! by Pat Mora have won 2 Américas Book Awards and 3 Pura Belpré Honors for illustration.

When developing books he immerses himself in research believing it is the genesis of innovative ideas and conceptual direction. The artist is drawn to picture books because he believes words and images have the power to make convincing change. When children see themselves in the pages of books it encourages them to reach their full potential. He cites the need to go beyond stereotypes and misrepresentations and deal with the complex issues of life in an increasingly interconnected world.

In 2012 he was selected by the Library of Congress to create the National Book Festival poster to celebrate reading and literacy. Honorary Co-Chairs for this event were President Obama and First Lady Michelle Obama and it featured more than 125 best-selling authors, illustrators and poets on the National Mall in Washington, D.C. López served as the honorary chair of California's Read Across America and speaks around the United States and abroad to promote reading and literacy. Children's books illustrated by Rafael López have been printed in Arabic, Chinese, Dutch, English, French, German, Japanese, Portuguese, Spanish and Swedish.

López spends time outside the studio traveling, painting murals, and reading with children. Using pictures and storytelling in both books and murals he strives to communicate hope and the knowledge that kids and families have the power to make change in their own communities. In economically challenging times, he supports public libraries and librarians and advocates for the vital role they play in connecting children to books and awakening their curiosity for a variety of subjects. The artist speaks at libraries and schools around the nation, working to create appreciation and awareness of libraries as cultural institutions relevant to a diverse community.

== Posters ==
As part of a grassroots effort he created a poster called Nuestra Voz that was printed with friends and distributed to key swing states in an effort to win the pivotal Latino vote for democratic Presidential candidate Barack Obama. The poster was brought to the attention of the national campaign by field workers and his 2008 poster Voz Unida was selected by the Obama/Biden campaign as an official poster at Artists for Obama. This poster became part of a series of ten limited edition art prints created and donated by artists to support the presidential campaign of United States President Barack Obama and were sold to raise campaign funds through his official website. The success of the initial poster fueled the decision to choose López to create a new image for the re-election campaign. In 2012 a new poster "Estamos Unidos" was released and he was the only original Artist for Obama to make an official poster for the re-election effort.

He was asked to create the National Book Festival poster for the Library of Congress in 2012. Birds are a frequent subject of his work and in 2012 he worked with Environment for the Americas as the International Migratory Bird Day artist. In that role, he created a poster encouraging diverse children to become involved in birdwatching and appreciation of birds. López also created a series of four posters in 2014 as the Americas Latino Eco Festival artist. To encourage summer reading for children, he developed a poster and other graphics for the Collaborative Summer Library Program, One World, Many Stories.

During the 2013 32nd Sharjah International Book Fair in the United Arab Emirates he was asked to teach a poster design workshop to aspiring and established illustrators. He also visited Sharjah in 2011 to teach an art workshop to children.

== Postal stamps ==
In 2022 López was selected as the first Guest Artist of the Smithsonian National Postal Museum. He taught a series of summer workshops to young people and adults about his stamp design process and shared the importance of representation and inclusivity in artworks at the National Postal Museum in Washington D.C.

He has created thirteen stamps for the United States Postal Service including a series of 5 stamps about Mariachi music in 2022. The vibrant stamps featured mariachi musicians dressed in the traje de charro, playing the guitar, guitarrón, vihuela, violin and trumpet. On NPR he described the power and universal quality of mariachi music to transcend language and culture bringing people together around the world. Also in 2022 he illustrated a whimsical stamp featuring a mother elephant playing with its young calf. He is the artist of a series of 5 stamps in 2010 for the United States Postal Service featuring Latin Music Legends Celia Cruz, Carlos Gardel, Carmen Miranda, Tito Puente and Selena. His 2007 U.S.P.S. stamp celebrated an important legal case in equality of education called Mendez vs. Westminster. Lopez's Let's Dance Merengue postal stamp was featured on the cover of the commemorative stamp yearbook in 2006 and at a special exhibition at the Smithsonian called Trendsetters and Trailblazers.

== Exhibitions and collections ==
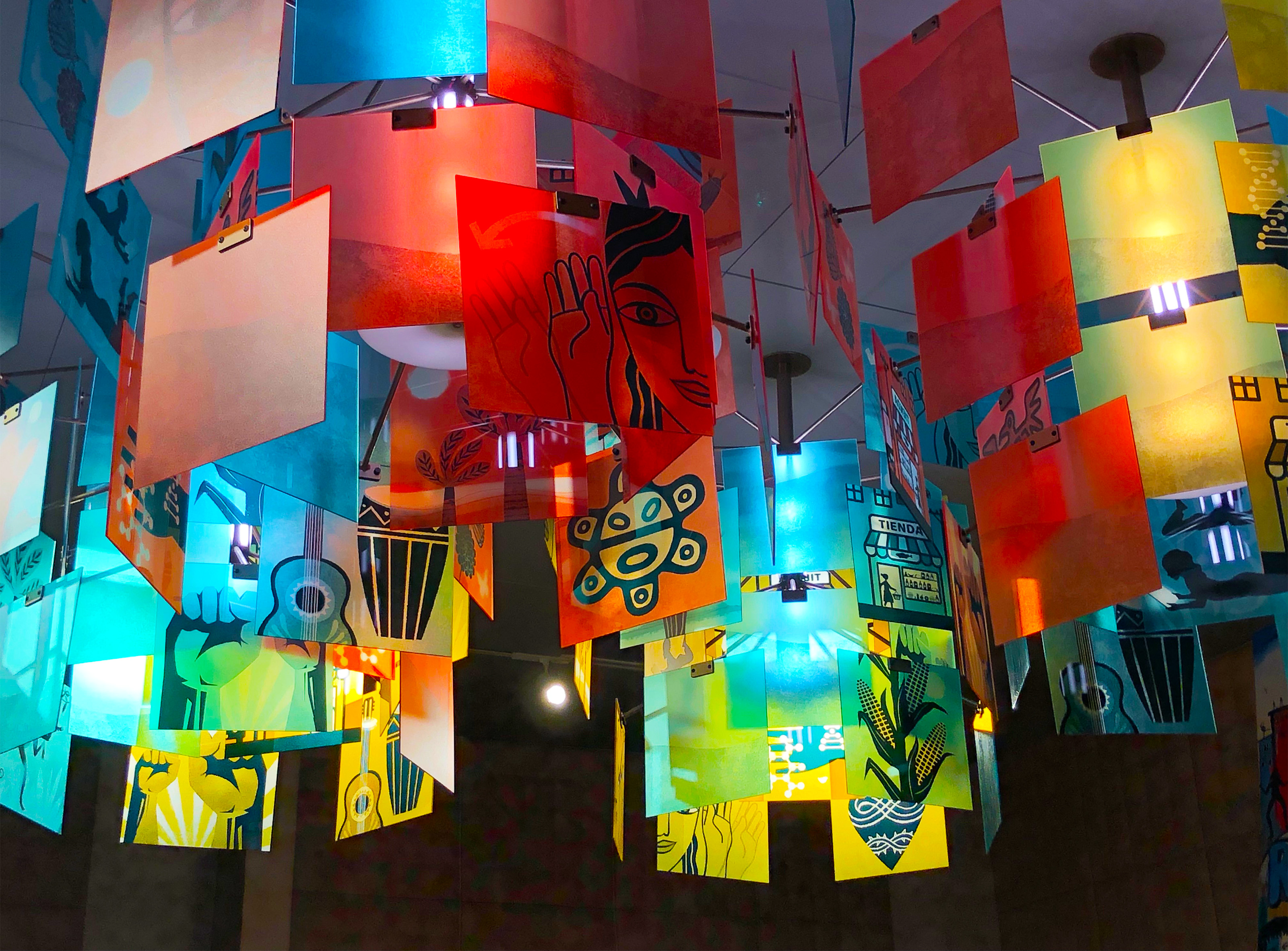
Smithsonian National Museum of the American Latino, Rafael López chandelier.

In 2024, López was the subject of a retrospective at the National Center for Children’s Illustrated Literature. The exhibition presented over fifty original works and emphasized his fusion of Mexican folk traditions with modern visual storytelling. It also featured a community mural and an interactive art-making activity. Rafael López created 57 portraits documenting Latino heritage and culture in the U.S.in 2022, for ¡Presente! A Latino History of the United States at the Smithsonian National Museum of the American Latino in Washington D.C. Lopez's work was part of the 2020 exhibit, Now & Then: Contemporary Illustrators and their Childhood Art and the 2017 exhibition, Eric Carle and Friends: What's your Favorite Color? at the Eric Carle Museum in Amherst, Massachusetts. In 2016, original paintings were exhibited at the Smithsonian's National Postal Museum at an exhibition called New York City: A Portrait through stamp art. Several of Lopez's works were exhibited in 2016 at the National Hispanic Cultural Center in Albuquerque, New Mexico and in 2015 at the National Museum of Mexican Art in Chicago. Selected paintings on wood and original drawings were shown at a multimedia exhibition called Writing With Pictures at the California Center for the Arts. Original art by López can also be found in the Mazza Museum, International Art for children's books collection. Archival materials about the life and work of Rafael López are part of the University of California, Santa Barbara CEMA Library Collection. Works by Rafael López were exhibited at Manifest Hope in Washington D.C., Manifest Equality in Los Angeles and Re:Form Education in New York. In 2009, he was asked to create three paintings for Oprah Winfrey's school in South Africa and then presented them to her at the National Association for Independent Schools conference in Chicago, Illinois.

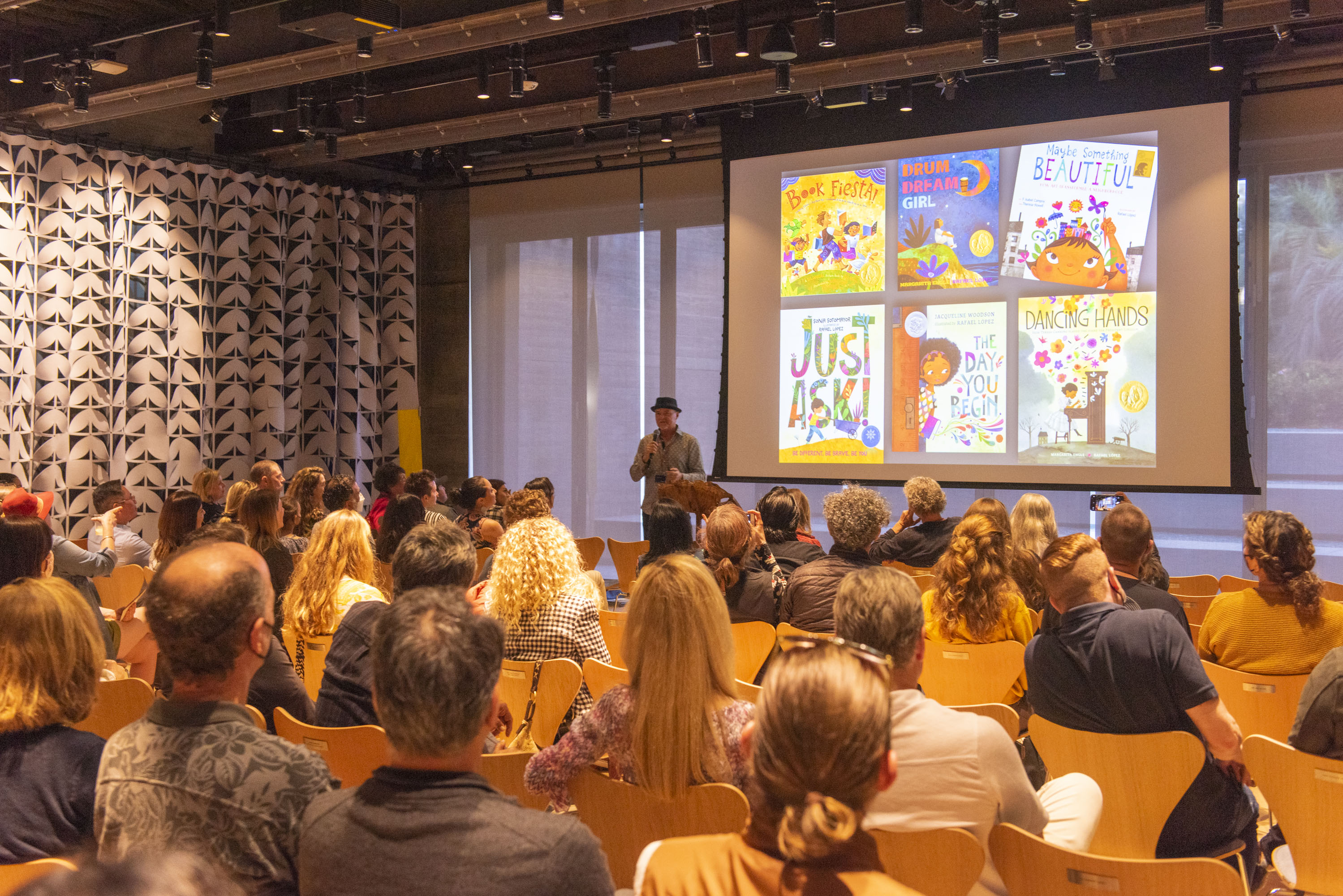
Rafael Lopez speaks at the Mingei Museum.

== Murals ==
López envisioned and led the Urban Art Trail Project in 1997, that transformed San Diego's East Village with colorful murals, sculptures and art installations and serves as a model of urban renewal that has been implemented in cities around the nation, Australia and Canada. This effort is the subject of the children's book Maybe Something Beautiful from Houghton Mifflin Harcourt, illustrated by Rafael López. The book is the recipient of the 2017 Tomás Rivera Book Award for Young Readers. It was also honored by the International Latino Book Awards as best Latino-focused children's picture book. This story celebrates the power of community and reminds readers that a small group of committed individuals can impact meaningful change. The artist is energized by the idea of bringing art out of galleries and into the streets so it is accessible to everyone. Through this work, López has discovered that community murals can be a powerful tool to bring diverse people together. To build community and encourage participation by young people and untrained artists López developed a mural style that works like a large-scale paint by numbers. These collective murals help neighbors work collaboratively to take ownership of their communities. Working with urban libraries, López uses art to bring communities together and cites diversity as a bridge that can build trust, enlightenment and innovation.

After an act of violence on a Chicago playground, he worked with community organizers to make a vibrant mural painted by the community to empower families to reclaim their neighborhood using art. He has designed and developed murals in collaboration with the National Museum of Mexican Fine Art in Chicago, American Federation of Teachers and other organizations. López's murals can be found throughout downtown San Diego and on Harbor Island, at the San Diego office of the American Federation of Teachers, numerous children's hospitals, under bridges and at public elementary schools including a series at the San Diego Cooperative Charter School. He has worked with hundreds of children, families and community members to create murals in Fresno, San Diego, Los Angeles and Pittsburg California, Fort Collins and Boulder, Colorado, Chicago, Illinois and Seattle, Washington.

Notable Mural Locations:

- Boulder Arts Mural - 13th St & Arapahoe, Boulder
- Chicago Community Mural - Addison & Avondale, Chicago
- Fresno Community Mural - Cedar & Tulare, Fresno
- 826LA A dream is a wish your heart makes Mural - 1714 W. Sunset Blvd., Los Angeles,
- Maybe Something Beautiful Mural - San Diego Cooperative Charter School 2
- New Children's Mural - Children's Memorial Hospital, Chicago
- Rafael Lopez Community Mural - Civic Ctr Parking Structure, Ft. Collins, Colorado
- The Joy of Urban Living - Tenth & E Street, San Diego
- The Strength of the Women - Park Blvd & Market St, San Diego
- Urban Discovery Mural - 14th & G St, San Diego

In 2022, as part of his work as Guest Artist at the Smithsonian Postal Museum, López created resources for community members interested in creating their own neighborhood murals.

== Personal life ==
Rafael López lives in San Diego, California, and the UNESCO World Heritage city of San Miguel de Allende, Mexico with his wife Candice, a Professor of Art and Design, and a son.

== Illustrated books ==
- And They Walk On (2025) written by Kevin Maillard, Roaring Brook Press, ISBN 978-1250821980
- The Little Book of Joy (2022) written by His Holiness the Dalai Lama and Archbishop Desmond Tutu, Crown Books for Young Readers, an imprint of Penguin Random House, ISBN 9780593484234
- The Year We Learned to Fly (2022) (New York Times #2 Children's Picture Books Bestseller written by Jacqueline Woodson, Nancy Paulsen Books, an imprint of Penguin Random House, ISBN 9780399545535
- I'll Meet You in Your Dreams (2021) written by Jessica Young, Little, Brown books for Young Readers, ISBN 9780316453288
- Just Ask!: Be Brave, Be Different, Be You (2019) (American Library Association-2020 Schneider Family Book Award, New York Times #1 Children's Picture Books Bestseller, written by Sonia Sotomayor), Philomel Books, an imprint of Penguin Random House, ISBN 978-0525514121
- Dancing Hands: How Teresa Carreño Played the Piano for President Lincoln (2019), (American Library Association-2020 Pura Belpré Medal, written by Margarita Engle), Atheneum Books for Young Readers, Simon & Schuster ISBN 978-1-4814-8740-5
- Sunny Day: A Celebration of the Sesame Street Theme Song (2019, Illustrator, Written by Joe Raposo), Penguin Random House, ISBN 978-1-9848-5253-3
- We've Got the Whole World in our Hands (2018), Orchard Books, an imprint of Scholastic, ISBN 978-1338177367
- The Day You Begin (2018), (Jane Addams Children's Book Award, National Cartoonist Society Best in Book Illustration, New York Times #1 Children's Picture Books Bestseller, Illustrator, Written by Jacqueline Woodson), Nancy Paulsen Books, an imprint of Penguin Young Readers Group, ISBN 978-0399246531
- We Rise, We Resist, We Raise our Voices (2018, Illustrator, edited by Wade Hudson and Cheryl Willis Hudson), Penguin Random House, ISBN 978-0525580423
- What's your Favorite Color (2017, Illustrator, Eric Carle and Friends), Henry Holt and Co., ISBN 978-0805096149
- Bravo! Poems About Amazing Hispanics (2017 Society of Illustrators New York, Original Art Silver Medal, Illustrator, written by Margarita Engle), Henry Holt and Co., ISBN 978-0-8050-98761
- Maybe Something Beautiful (2017 Tomás Rivera Children's Book Award, 2016 International Latino Book Award, written by F. Isabel Campoy & Theresa Howell), Houghton Mifflin Harcourt, ISBN 978-054435769-3
- Drum Dream Girl (2016 American Library Association-Pura Belpré Medal, Illustrator, written by Margarita Engle), Houghton Mifflin Harcourt, ISBN 978-0544102293
- Tito Puente Mambo King, Rey del Mambo (2014 Pura Belpré Honor, Illustrator, written by Monica Brown), HarperCollins, ISBN 978-0-06-122783-7
- The Cazuela that the Farm Maiden Stirred (2012 Pura Belpré Honor, Illustrator, written by Samantha Vamos), Charlesbridge, ISBN 978-1-58089-242-1
- Book Fiesta! (2010 American Library Association-Pura Belpré Medal, Illustrator, written by Pat Mora), Harper Collins, ISBN 978-0-06-128877-7
- Our California (2008, Illustrator, written by Pam Muñoz Ryan), Charlesbridge, ISBN 978-1-58089-116-5
- Yum! !MmMm! !Que rico! (2007 Americas Award, Illustrator, written by Pat Mora), Lee & Low Books, ISBN 978-1-60060-267-2
- My Name is Celia, Me Llamo Celia (2004 Americas Award and Pura Belpré Honor, written by Monica Brown), Luna Rising, ISBN 0-87358-872-X
