= Artists for Obama =

Series of fine-art prints

Artists for Obama was a series of ten limited-edition fine-art prints created and donated by various artists under the direction of U.S. President Barack Obama's 2008 presidential campaign organization, Obama for America. The prints were official campaign products of Obama for America, sold directly by its website, and all proceeds were considered campaign contributions.

== 2008 prints ==
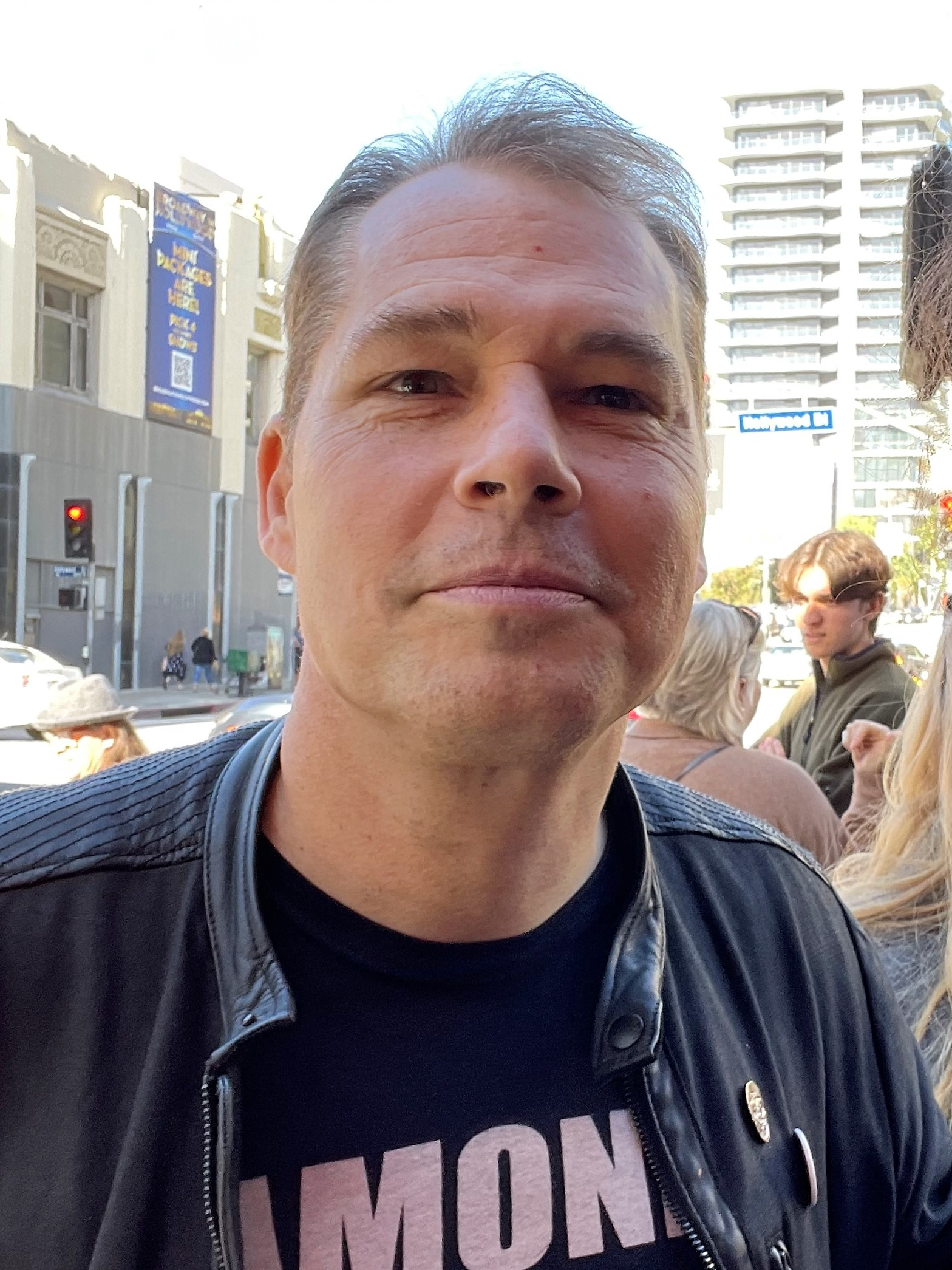
Shepard Fairey created the first print for Artists for Obama in January 2008.

The first Artists for Obama print was released in January 2008, and was created by Shepard Fairey and titled "Change" (in the style of his Obama "Hope" poster). The prints were released as a limited edition of 5,000, of which the first 200 were signed, and retailed for $70.

"Progress," by Scott Hansen, was released on May 23, 2008, as a limited edition of 5,000, and retailed for $70.

"Yes We Can," by illustrator Antar Dayal, was the third print in the series. A limited edition of 5,000 numbered prints, of which the first 200 were signed, the print retailed for $70. The image was created on a Kaolin-coated scratchboard, then coated with black China ink, and finally engraved with fine lines "into the surface, sculpting shadows and highlights."

"Sea to Shining Sea," by Lou Stovall was released in October 2008 as a limited edition of 100 prints. The print retailed for $1,000.

"Hope," by pop artist Robert Indiana, was released in October 2008 as a signed-and-numbered limited edition of 200 prints, which sold out at a price of $2,500 each.

"Possible," by Jonathan Hoefler was released in October 2008 as a limited edition of 5,000. The prints sold for $70.

"Words of Change," by graphic designer Gui Borchert was released in October 2008 in a numbered edition of 5,000, and retailed for $70. The poster contains 20,000 words spoken by Obama during the campaign that are arranged as a portrait of Obama.

"Voz Unida" by Rafael López, released in October 2008, was a limited edition of 5,000, and retailed for $60.

"OBAMA 08" by Lance Wyman, released in October 2008, was a limited edition of 5,000.

"Raised Eyebrows/Furrowed Foreheads (Red, White, and Blue)" (2008) is by John Baldessari

The final Artists for Obama print was released just days before the 2008 presidential election, it was a limited edition print of 5,000 by Shepard Fairey, titled "Vote." Fairey had also created a famous tri-color poster of Obama.

== Inauguration print ==
In January 2009, the Obama inaugural committee released a print produced by Shepard Fairey on behalf of Obama's inauguration. 10,000 numbered prints were produced in total, of which the first 1,000 were signed by Fairey. The signed and numbered prints were sold by the Obama Inaugural Committee for $500, while the unsigned and unnumbered prints were sold for $100.
