= After Tupac and D Foster =

2008 book by Jacqueline Woodson

After Tupac And D Foster
- First edition
- Author: Jacqueline Woodson
- Language: English
- Genre: Children's Literature Fiction
- Published: January 1, 2008 Penguin Group
- Publication place: United States
- Media type: Paperback
- Pages: 153 P.
- ISBN: 9780399246548
- OCLC: 816486941

After Tupac And D Foster (2008) is a novel written by Jacqueline Woodson. Set within a community affected by the life of Tupac Shakur, the novel follows three young girls as they group up in that community. The novel received a Newbery Medal Honor in 2009 and won the American Library Association Award and the 2009 Josette Frank Award.

== Plot summary ==
After Tupac And D Foster is based on three girls: two black eleven year old girls, Neeka and the anonymous narrator, and D Foster, who was of mixed race and had just moved into Neeka and the narrator's neighborhood in Queens, New York. Their experiences are set within a world impacted by Tupac Shakur, describing events and experiences in his life during the mid 1990s, such as run-ins with the cops and events that foreshadowed his death.

Growing up together on the same block of their safe neighborhood, Neeka and the narrator have been friends since birth. When D. Foster first showed up on their block, her initial impression as unconventional and different had left the two girls in a bit of shock, as well as their mothers hesitant to let them interact with her. However, they then discovered that they both were greatly influenced by Tupac Shakur's music which caused the three girls to gradually develop a lasting friendship.

Later in their teens, Foster opens up to her two close friends about her alcoholic mother who had abandoned her as a child, leaving her in the care of constantly changing foster homes. She also shares with them the news of her biological Mother now wanting her back. However, relating her relationship with her Mother to that of Tupac's and his Mother, Foster realizes that even through the conflicting relationship, there is still love.

== Characters ==
- Narrator - The main character, an unnamed 12 year old girl who tells the story.
- Neeka - Also the main character, was the narrator's childhood friend.
- D Foster - Friend of Neeka and the Narrators. She moves to the city in the summer with her foster mother.
- Flo - Short for D's Foster Mom.
- Tash - Neeka's gay brother who's in prison. He is also referred to as "The Queen" or "Sissy".
- Ms. Irene - Neeka's Mom
- Jay (Jackson) Jones - Neeka's older brother who plays ball for Grady high school and works at KFC.

== Awards ==
- Newbery Medal
- Josette Frank Award
- American Library Association Award
