= Autobiography of a Family Photo =

1995 book by Jacqueline Woodson

- Author: Jacqueline Woodson
- Language: English
- Genre: Adult fiction Coming-of-age
- Publisher: Dutton Adult
- Publication date: March 1, 1995
- Publication place: United States
- Media type: Paperback
- Pages: 128
- ISBN: 978-0-525-93721-0

Autobiography of a Family Photo is a 1995 book by Jacqueline Woodson. The book covers childhood, the growth of dark emotional and sexual tension, and the terrors of war.
