= Feathers (novel) =

Novel by Jacqueline Woodson

- Author: Jacqueline Woodson
- Language: English
- Genre: Young adult fiction
- Publisher: Putnam Juvenile
- Publication date: March 1, 2007
- Publication place: United States
- Media type: Print (Hardcover)
- Pages: 118
- ISBN: 978-0-399-23989-2

Feathers is a children's historical novel by Jacqueline Woodson that was first published in 2007. The story is about a sixth-grade girl named Frannie growing up in the 1970s. One day an unexpected new student provokes chaos to the class because he is the only white boy in the whole school. Feathers grapples with concepts such as religion, race, hope, and understanding. The book examines what it was like to grow up right after segregation had been outlawed, how all people are equal, and that hope is everywhere. The book was a Newbery Honor winner in 2008.

== Summary ==
Taking place in the 1970s, in an urban all African American school, this book highlights the hard topics of racism, faith, hope, and disabilities. A white boy comes to the school and is soon dubbed "Jesus Boy". His entrance as the only white student causes tension and misunderstandings. Some of the students believe that he is Jesus and others simply hope he is. He is quiet and does not let Trevor, the class bully, hurt him. He just calmly talks to Trevor and never retaliates.

Jesus Boy knows sign language which intrigues Frannie since she has known sign language her whole life. Frannie has grown up with a deaf older brother, and is sensitive to how people treat and perceive him. She is hesitant about being friends with Jesus Boy because she does not understand him and wonders why he would cross over "the bridge" to their side. She is torn because she knows how difficult it can be to be the new kid, but she does not want to stand out. Frannie's best friend Samantha believes that Jesus Boy truly is Jesus Christ and that he has come in this time of chaos and because of the war. During all that is going on Frannie constantly thinks of the poem she read in class that said "Hope is the thing with feathers".

Jesus Boy is subject to much bullying by Trevor. Trevor picks on Jesus Boy because he is the only one who is lighter skinned than himself. Trevor has a white father who left his mother before Trevor was born. One day Trevor is swinging and decides to try to jump off and land on a fence because he wants to feel like he is flying. He falls short and breaks his arm. When he comes back to school he is even angrier at Jesus Boy and starts a fight with him with one arm. Trevor swings at Jesus Boy and misses which causes him to fall. The class realizes that Trevor is just a boy and that they should not be afraid of him anymore. Jesus Boy and Frannie immediately go and help Trevor up out of the snow.

Later Samantha asks Frannie why she helped Trevor, and Frannie doesn't know. Samantha then admits that she was wrong about Jesus Boy and says she does not know what to believe in anymore. Frannie tries to comfort Samantha and says "Maybe there's a little bit of Jesus inside of all of us. Maybe Jesus is just that something good or something sad or something ... something that makes us do stuff like help Trevor up even when he is cursing us out. Or maybe ... maybe Jesus is just that thing you had when the Jesus Boy got here, Samantha. Maybe Jesus is the hope that you were feeling" (p. 109).

At the end of the book Frannie reflects on all that has been happening in her life. She thinks of her mother's baby, her brother, Samantha's loss of faith, and, especially, Jesus Boy. She remembers the poem she read in class and decides "Each moment, I am thinking, is a thing with feathers"

== Characters ==
- Frannie, is The main character and an African American sixth-grade student. She is protective of her older brother, Sean, who is deaf. (page, 8)
- Jesus Boy: The new white boy to the completely African American sixth-grade class. He was adopted by African-American parents, which is why they moved to the other side of the bridge from the “White side”. At first, he didn't fit in because of his coloring, but then things changed.
- Ms. Johnson: The sixth-grade teacher who inspires Frannie to work on her writing. She is supportive and encouraging to the students, and allows the students to be themselves. She is strict but productive.
- Sean: Frannie’s older brother who is deaf. He is smart, handsome, and athletic. He struggles with the fact that girls like him until they discover he cannot hear. He also wishes to go to the other side of the bridge.
- Mama: Frannie and Sean's mother who has lost many children during childbirth. She becomes pregnant again and is worried about the baby.
- Daddy: A truck driver who is gone for long stretches at a time. He is Frannie and Sean's father and worries about their mother's health.
- Trevor: The bully of the sixth grade. He especially hates Jesus Boy because only he is lighter-skinned than Trevor. Since Jesus Boy will not identify with being white, Trevor turns upon him.
- Rayray (Raymond Raysen): Trevor’s partner that at first picks on Jesus Boy because he is afraid of Trevor. Later he realizes that he should not be afraid of Trevor and sticks up for Jesus Boy.
- Maribel Bagel Tanks: Maribel's parents own the town grocery store and charge high prices. She thinks she is above all the other students because she once went to a now-shuttered private school. She does not get along with Frannie because Frannie does not allow Maribel to get her way all the time. Maribel especially hates Jesus Boy because he came to her store and paid all in coins.
- Samantha: Frannie's best friend who hopes that Jesus Boy is really Jesus returning to save them. Her father is the pastor at her church, and later when she realizes Jesus Boy is just a boy she questions herself.
- Grandma: Frannie and Sean's grandmother, who is religious.

== Major themes ==
=== Hope ===
The title of the book, Feathers, is a metaphor that the book revolves around. Woodson introduces it through a poem that Frannie reads in class.

Hope is the thing with feathers
that perches in the soul,
And sings the tune-- without the words,
And never stops at all

— Emily Dickinson

After reading this, Frannie spends the rest of the book trying to understand hope. How does it have feathers?

=== Understanding ===
The effort to understand one another was the focus of the sixth grade class as soon as Jesus Boy entered their classroom. Through Jesus Boy they realize that even the bully, Trevor, is a normal youth. After the fight Frannie realizes "Even though he was mean all the time, the sun still stopped and colored him and warmed him─like it did to everybody else" (p. 21) Jesus Boy helped the class to stop beating up each other so much and Trevor was frightened by him.

=== Disabilities ===
Frannie's older brother is deaf and this is a source of tension throughout the story. Frannie feels compelled to protect her brother in a world of people who do not understand him. One difficulty Sean encounters is girls being attracted to him until they find out he is deaf. Woodson stated in an interview with NPR that she made Sean deaf in order to humanize the deaf. One scene in the book that does this well is when Frannie asks Sean what a guitar sounds like, a game they play with one another. His sign back is 'Like rain. Coming down real soft when it's warm out and you only get a little wet but not cold. That kind of rain.'

== Reception ==
Feathers was well received by critics and the public alike. The book was a Newbery Honor book in 2008. Robin Smith, of Book Page, said that the book filled him with "joy and hope." Norah Piehl, of Kids Reads, reviewed the book saying, "Set against the music, politics and conflicts of the early 1970s, Jacqueline Woodson's exceptional new novel grounds universal ideas in a particular time and place." Matt Berman, of Common Sense Media stated the book is beautifully written, lyrical, thoughtful, at times even wise and that it will also be loved by adults. One reviewer raved about the book but said "While the subject matter isn't as controversial as some of Woodson's others it might lead a child living in today's society to have questions about race, segregation and religion".

Overall, the book gets mostly high praise, and Jacqueline Woodson is hailed for her beautiful style of writing. One fan says Woodson writes "pages of poetry" and "without any heavy-handedness or manipulation".

== Other books by Woodson ==
Jaqueline Woodson has written 29 books spanning from picture books to young adult fiction. Her books have received numerous awards such as the Caldecott Honor, Newbery Honor, and the Coretta Scott King Award. Feathers most resembles her novel Locomotion in which she "tackled grief, trauma, death survival, and hope". all in a short book. Feathers is also short but addresses big concepts of "hope, healing, faith, and understanding". Both of the books are around 115 pages and adequately handle their difficult topics.
