= The Other Side (Woodson book) =

Book by Jacqueline Woodson

- Front cover, designed by E. B. Lewis
- Author: Jacqueline Woodson
- Illustrator: E. B. Lewis
- Language: English
- Genre: Children's literature
- Publisher: G. P. Putnam's Sons/Penguin Group
- Publication date: 2001
- Publication place: United States
- Media type: Print
- Pages: 32 pages
- ISBN: 978-0-399-23116-2
- OCLC: 42080178
- Dewey Decimal: [E] 21
- LC Class: PZ7.W868 Th 2001

The Other Side is a children's picture book written by Jacqueline Woodson and illustrated by E. B. Lewis, published in 2001 by G. P. Putnam's Sons. In 2012, the book was adapted into a film by Weston Woods Studios, Inc., narrated by the author's daughter, Toshi Widoff-Woodson.

== Summary ==
The narrator and protagonist of the story is Clover, a young African-American girl. She lives beside a fence which segregates her town. Her mother instructs her never to climb over to the other side. Then one summer, she notices a Caucasian girl on the other side of the fence. The girl seems to be very lonely and is even outside when it is raining.

Clover decides to talk to the girl on the other side of the fence. Both girls are not allowed to cross the fence, so they simply decide to sit on the fence together. First, Clover's friends will not let Annie, the girl from the other side, play with them but then all of the girls realize that the fence (a symbol separating the whites and blacks) should not be there.

== Reception ==
The Other Side was reviewed by Kirkus, writing that "award-winning Lewis’s lovely realistic watercolor paintings allow readers to be quiet observers viewing the issue from both sides".

The book won or was nominated for several awards:

- ALA Notable Book
- SLJ Best Book of the Year
- Booklist Editor’s Choice
- 2001 Time of Wonder Award
- IRA Teacher’s Choices 2002
- 2004 Louisiana Young Reader’s Choice Award (Honor)
- California Young Reader Medal Nominee
- 2003-2004 South Carolina Book Award Nominee
