= Another Brooklyn =

2016 novel by Jacqueline Woodson

- Hardcover edition
- Author: Jacqueline Woodson
- Language: English
- Genre: Adult fiction
- Published: 2016
- Publisher: Amistad Press
- Publication place: United States
- Media type: Print
- Pages: 192
- ISBN: 978-0062359988

Another Brooklyn is a 2016 novel by Jacqueline Woodson. The book was written as an adult book, unlike many of the author's previous books and titles. NPR wrote that the book was "full of dreams and danger". It was nominated for the National Book Award for Fiction in 2016.

== Plot ==
The story starts with August, an adult anthropologist, returning to New York to bury her father. On the subway, she encounters an old friend, and begins to reminisce. She remembers being an 8 year old girl moving with her father and younger brother to Brooklyn from Tennessee after the death of her mother. The book then follows August through her teenage years. August shares friendships with three other Brooklynites, Sylvia, Angela, and Gigi, as they walk through the neighborhoods and dream optimistically of the future, and revealing what it held in store for them. August and her friends also face dangers on the streets, and family strife of various types.

== Reviews ==
The book received many reviews. To The Washington Post, it is a "short but complex story that arises from simmering grief. It lulls across the pages like a mournful whisper." Publishers Weekly writes that it is "a vivid mural of what it was like to grow up African-American in Brooklyn during the 1970s."

NBC News wrote that it "weaves together themes of death, friendship, Black migrations, the sense of displacement that usually follows, and family." The New York Times said "the subject isn’t as much girlhood, as the haunting half-life of its memory." Kaitlyn Greenidge for The Boston Globe wrote that the book was "a love letter to loss, girlhood and home. It is a lyrical, haunting exploration of family, memory and other ties that bind us to one another and the world." USA Today gave it 3 out of 4 stars.

The Los Angeles Times said that the book "joins the tradition of studying female friendships and the families we create when our own isn’t enough, like that of Toni Morrison’s 'Sula,' Tayari Jones’ 'Silver Sparrow' and 'Zami: A New Spelling of My Name' by Audre Lorde. Woodson uses her expertise at portraying the lives of children to explore the power of memory, death and friendship."
