= I Hadn't Meant to Tell You This =

1994 young adult book by Jacqueline Woodson

- Author: Jacqueline Woodson
- Genre: Juvenile fiction, realistic fiction
- Publisher: Delacorte
- Publication date: 1994
- Publication place: United States
- Awards: Coretta Scott King Award

I Hadn't Meant to Tell You This is a book targeted towards young adults published in 1994 by Jacqueline Woodson. The story takes place in Chauncey, Ohio, and it focuses on the growing friendship between a black girl native to this town named Marie and a white girl her age by the name of Lena. Along the way they face challenges and secrets that test their friendship.

== Synopsis ==
The story begins with it being the third day of school and it being the day Lena first arrives in Chauncey and how she slowly becomes friends with Marie. The two girls despite being polar opposites become friends due to their differences and to the fact that they both lost their mothers with Marie's mother leaving her and her father at an early part of her life and Lena's passing away when she was young. There are challenges towards their relationship, with it mainly being towards the community being composed of mostly black people and few white people who aren't as financially well-off compared to the former. There is also Marie's other friend Sherry who views Lena as nothing more than "whitetrash" and Lena confiding in Marie a secret regarding Lena's father sexually abusing her, which Marie struggles to keep secret despite her protests to Lena. By the end of the novel, the abuse has gone to the point where Lena's younger sister, Dion, is being affected as well. Lena and Dion leave Ohio and Lena bids farewell to Marie after the latter calls to see if she is okay. Marie in the days that come is saddened by the departure of her friend and asks herself "Why can't we all just be people here?" after remembering a comment Lena made earlier on how "We all just people here".

== Characters ==
- Marie, one of the main protagonists of the story, a black girl native to the town of Chauncey, Ohio and has been shown to have grown up in a privileged household with her father. Her mother left the family when she was little.
- Lena is the second main protagonist of the story being a white girl from a poor background, is new to Chauncey, lives with her little sister and abusive father and wishes to become an artist.
- Sherry is Marie's first friend, with a bossy attitude and is considered popular in school is someone not fond of white people like Lena.
- Dion is Lena's little sister who has a fondness towards books and sports. Becomes a friend to Marie and often goes to her house with alongside Lena.
- Marie's Father is the father of Marie who participated in the Civil Rights Movement, and has negative views towards the white people of Chauncey but has a change of views after meeting Lena.

== Background ==
Jacqueline Woodson wrote this book, as well as some of her other works, by drawing from aspects of her life and having a sense of how she relates to some of her characters in order to bring experience into her stories.

== Themes ==
- One of the main themes of this story is the relationship that revolves around the children of different races and the topic of sexual abuse. This theme is showing the complications between the black people who are in a more stable living situation than the white people of this town, yet despite that shows a friendship between these two classes of people.
- The other theme, sexual abuse, shows how challenging the situation can be depending on the circumstances, because in the text Lena tells her secret to Marie, who believes it would be best to alert the proper authorities, but because of prior experience as well as being poor Lena is unable to bring herself to do it out of fear of being separated from her sister. Thus, at the end Lena leaves Chauncey with her younger sister, Dion, in tow, leaving Marie to not know what became of her after. According to children's literature scholar Angela Hubler, this book is targeted towards young adults and she speaks of how it contains barriers that the characters had to overcome, but there was one however that Lena could not overcome, and thus the abuse was the reason she and her sister ran away.

== Release Information ==
This book was released on May 1, 1994 with a sequel titled Lena released on October 13, 1999.

== Reception ==
Kirkus describes it as a book where "Friendship lightens the burden of adolescence" .

== Awards ==
- Coretta Scott King Book Award.
- ALA Best Book for Young Adults.
- ALA Notable Book.
- Booklist Editors' Choice.
- Horn Book Fanfare.
