= Red at the Bone =

2019 novel by Jacqueline Woodson

- 2019 book jacket
- Author: Jacqueline Woodson
- Subject: Bildungsromans, African-American women and families in fiction, teenage pregnancy in fiction
- Genre: Fiction
- Set in: Brooklyn and the Midwest of the United States
- Publisher: Riverhead Books
- Publication date: September 17, 2019
- Publication place: United States
- Media type: Print, ebook
- Pages: 196 pp
- ISBN: 9780525535270
- OCLC: 1099754421
- Dewey Decimal: 813/.54
- LC Class: PS3573.O64524 R43 2019
- Website: Official website

Red at the Bone is a coming-of-age novel by American writer Jacqueline Woodson originally published by Riverhead Books in 2019.

== Premise ==
Red at the Bone follows two African American families connected by the unexpected teenage pregnancy of sixteen-year-old Iris. Melody celebrates her coming-of-age ceremony in Brooklyn, while her parents, Iris and Aubrey, who were never married and had Melody out of wedlock and as teenagers, reflect on their own pasts. Through flashbacks, Iris's struggle with motherhood an her decision to pursue college gives context to the resulting strain on her relationship with Aubrey. The story interweaves generational perspectives, revealing the impact of Melody's birth on both families and the ways their lives intertwine across time.

== About the book ==
The story has some interesting elements as noted by reviewers. According to Joshunda Sanders of Time, "Woodson evokes black formalism, a post-Reconstruction movement meant to highlight black dignity through dress, style and traditions performed beyond the white gaze..." And, Woodson employs a minimalist writing style, believing fewer words with emotional impact best serves the story. This style results in a short novel of about 200 pages. NPR says this book also "reads like poetry and drama..." The story itself revolves around five characters of two families spanning three generations. Also, Woodson employs shifting points of view and "the narrative nimbly jumps around in time." And the book explores class, religion, race, generational wealth, and sexuality. National Public Radio says, "this book [also] manages to encompass issues of...education, ambition, racial prejudice, sexual desire and orientation, identity, mother-daughter relationships, parenthood and loss...." Lastly, reviewers provide praise for the author's previous works and awards in the first part of their reviews.

=== Summary ===
One of the anchors of this story is the mother, Iris, who abandons her child. Such a troubling character is to be automatically disparaged in most cultures around the world, including America. The emotional pain inflicted on the child is presumed to be incalculable. However, Woodson gives the reader the possibility that "the wound of maternal abandonment could [perhaps] be alleviated [and] healed by other kinds of love."

Iris becomes pregnant in high school at the age of 15 by a boy named Aubrey, who is also still in high school. Yet, after the baby is born, Aubrey falls in love with his new born daughter named Melody and "being a parent." He moves into Iris's parents' house to start their new family life. In contrast, Iris cannot quench her desire for more than her parents' house and more than Aubrey. She leaves the house, Aubrey, and her daughter for college, which is a significant distance from home. College was her plan before getting pregnant. She has no interest in Aubrey as father and mate.

Yet, years later Iris tells her daughter Melody, "I wanted you. I wanted you growing in my body, I wanted you in my arms, I wanted you over my shoulder," Hence, Iris went against her family's and others' passionate disapproval to give birth to Melody. But it turns out that "Melody spends her formative years with her father Aubrey and her maternal grandmother Sabe while her mother Iris heads off to college as planned."

== Characters ==
- Melody Ellison — Protagonist and teenage daughter of Iris and Aubrey
- Ellison family
  - Iris Ellison — Melody's mother who became pregnant as a teenager. She grapples with balancing motherhood and her personal ambitions.
  - Sabre "Sabe" Ellison — Iris's mother and Melody's grandmother from an affluent background, holding high hopes for her daughter.
  - Samuel "Po'Boy" Ellison — Iris's father and Melody's grandfather, who provides steady support to his family.
- Daniels family
  - Aubrey Daniels — Melody's father. He's a devoted parent from a modest, working-class background.
  - CathyMarie Daniels — Aubrey's mother, who raised him as a single mother.

== Reception ==
Heller McAlpin of National Public Radio says, "Woodson's language is beautiful throughout Red at the Bone, but it positively soars in the sections written from Iris' mother's point of view." Nic Stone of The Washington Post says, "Red at the Bone is a narrative steeped in truth — and, yes, it's painful. But it's also one of healing and hope." Joshunda Sanders of Time says, "Running through the novel is the realization that all stages of life have disruptions that will ripple on the surface and also below...." And The New York Times says, "With its abiding interest in the miracle of everyday love, Red at the Bone is a proclamation" Margaret Wilkerson Sexton of the San Francisco Chronicle says this book's "...vast emotional depth, rich historical understanding and revelatory pacing lure the reader into the tender makeup of one family's origin and promise.

== Awards ==
Year	Award	Category	Result	Ref
2019	Reading Women Award	Fiction	Shortlisted	
2020	Andrew Carnegie Medals for Excellence	Fiction	Longlisted	
2020	Aspen Words Literary Prize	—	Longlisted	
2020	BCALA Literary Awards	Honor Fiction	Longlisted	
2020	BookTube Prize	Fiction	Quarterfinalist	
2020	Ferro-Grumley Award	LGBTQ Fiction	Shortlisted	
2020	Lambda Literary Award	Lesbian Fiction	Shortlisted	
2020	NAACP Image Award	Fiction	Shortlisted	
2020	Ohioana Book Award	Fiction	Shortlisted	
