= Kerlan Award =

Literary award for children's literature

- Awarded for: Given to outstanding writers and illustrators represented in the Kerlan Collection.
- Country: United States
- Presented by: University of Minnesota's Kerlan Collection
- First award: 1975
- Website: www.lib.umn.edu/collections/special/clrc/kerlan-award

The Kerlan Award is a literary award given by the University of Minnesota's Kerlan Collection, a special library focusing on children's literature. Many awards focus on the finished product, but the Kerlan Award is given based on the creative process. It is given "In recognition of singular attainments in the creation of children's literature and in appreciation for generous donation of unique resources to the Kerlan Collection for the study of children's literature."

== Criteria for award ==
- The writer or illustrator must be represented within the Kerlan Collection
- The award should promote the goals of the collection and,
- that 'contribution' would emphasize the creative process.
- Awards may be given to a living person or posthumously.

Further refinement of the original guidelines have defined 'singular attainments' as peer acceptance, volume of work and a high standard of quality and the term 'generous donation' was tied directly to high research value in the area of children's literature.

== The Kerlan Collection ==
Irvine Kerlan, M.D. was a Minnesota native who earned his medical degree through the University of Minnesota. Throughout a successful medical career, which included working for the Food and Drug Administration (FDA), and lecturing throughout the United States he also collected children's books, artwork and manuscripts. His collection was so well respected that he loaned many of his piece out to libraries and museums both within the United States and abroad.

As his collecting hobby advanced, he began writing to authors and illustrators requesting meetings. He would invite them to his home, or visit them as his lecture schedule allowed. He often had books and manuscripts inscribed by these artists and writers. He became an Honorary Consultant on Children's Books for the Smithsonian Institution from 1958 to 1961 and had three of his exhibits travel through Europe, Asia and the Middle East after being sponsored by the U. S. Department of State.

Kerlan was killed in an automobile accident in 1963 and his collection of over 9,000 books, 180 manuscripts and many illustrations was willed to the University of Minnesota. There were also many types of correspondence with authors, artists, and editors.

Kerlan was the first of many estates given to the University of Minnesota libraries, and together these collections have become known as the Children's Literature Research Center (CLRC). Many famous authors and illustrators have donated works to the collection as well. Lois Lowry has given her original corrected manuscripts for thirteen novels, including her Newbery Award winning Number the Stars and The Giver. James Marshall has donated hundreds of sketches including many from the George and Martha and Miss Nelson series.

There are over 1,800 authors and illustrators represented in the collection with an item count of over 200,000.

== History of The Kerlan Award ==
The Kerlan Award was created to celebrate the 25th anniversary of the Kelan Collection coming to the University of Minnesota library. It was given the distinction of being a Presidential Citation at its creation.

== Kerlan Award recipients ==
Year	Winner	
1975	Marie Hall Ets	
	Marguerite Henry	
	Elizabeth Coatsworth	
1976	Roger Duvoisin	
1977	Wanda Gag	
1978	Carol Ryrie Brink	
1979	Margot Zemach	
1980	Glen Rounds	
1981	Tomie dePaola	
1982	Jean Craighead George	
1983	Katherine Paterson	
1984	Margaret Wise Brown and her Editors and Illustrators	
1985	Eleanor Cameron	
1986	Charlotte Zolotow	
1987	Charles Mikolaycak	
1988	Jane Yolen	
1989	Gail E. Haley	
1990	Madeleine L'Engle	
1991	Leonard Everett Fisher	
1992	Barbara Cooney	
1993	Mary Stolz	
1994	Myra Cohn Livingston	
1995	Phyllis Reynolds Naylor	
	Margot Tomes	
1996	Marion Dane Bauer	
	Paul Galdone	
1997	Theodore Taylor	
1998	Dahlov Ipcar	
1999	Eve Bunting	
	Lois Lenski	
	Dr. Edward B. Stanford	Sandford had encouraged Kerlan to donate his collection to the U of M library and, upon Kerlan's unexpected death, he was the one to secure marshals to guard the house while the collection was evaluated, catalogued and moved.
	Dr. Norine Odland	Dr. Orland was one of the first to recognize the high research value of the collection and bring students to view the works presented.
2000	Patricia Lauber	
2001	Jane Resh Thomas	
	Don Freeman	
2002	Joan Lowery Nixon	
	Barbara Esbensen	
2003	Nikki Grimes	
	Gustaf Tenggren	
2004	Lois Lowry	
2005	Ted Rand	
2006	Karen Hesse	
2007	Karen Cushman	
	Louis Slobodkin	
2008	Walter Dean Myers	
	Robert Kraus	
2009	Jeanette Winter	
2010	Nancy Carlson	
2011	Jane Kurtz	
2012	Karen Nelson Hoyle	
2013	Kate DiCamillo	
2014	Linda Sue Park and Russell Freedman	
2015	Sharon Creech	
2016	Betsy Lewin and Ted Lewin	
2017	John Coy	
2018	Jennifer L. Holm and Matthew Holm	
2019	Lois Ehlert and Claudia Mills	
2020	Jon Scieszka	
2021	Ariane Dewey	
2022	Andrea Davis Pinkney	
2023	Lauren Stringer and Laurie Hertzel	
2024	Lisa Yee	

== See also ==
- Newbery Medal
- Caldecott Medal for outstanding American picture books
- Carnegie Medal for outstanding children's books published in the United Kingdom
- Coretta Scott King Award for outstanding children's books related to the African-American experience
- Guardian Award for works of children's literature written by British or Commonwealth authors
- Kate Greenaway Medal for outstanding works of illustration in children's literature from the United Kingdom
- Laura Ingalls Wilder Medal for outstanding lifetime contribution to children's literature
