= Miracle's Boys (novel) =

2000 young adult novel by Jacqueline Woodson

- Miracle's Boys
- Author: Jacqueline Woodson
- Language: English
- Genre: Young Adult
- Publisher: Penguin Group
- Publication date: April 23, 2000 (1st edition)
- Publication place: United States
- Media type: Print (Hardcover)
- Pages: 131 (hardcover edition)
- Awards: 2001 Coretta Scott King Author Award
- ISBN: 0-399-23113-7

Miracle’s Boys is a young adult novel by Jacqueline Woodson featuring three young brothers of African-American and Puerto Rican descent growing up without parents in Harlem. It won the Coretta Scott King Award in 2001.

== Plot ==
8 years ago, Lafayette's brother Charlie was sent to a juvenile detention center, Rahway Home for Boys, for robbing a candy store. Since Charlie's return, twelve-year old Lafayette has thought of him as "Newcharlie" because of his changed behavior. In Charlie and Lafayette's shared bedroom, Charlie and his new friend Aaron discuss who's the baddest. Before they leave, Charlie blames Lafayette for the death of their mother.

Lafayette's oldest brother Ty'ree comes home from work. Before Lafayette was born, Daddy died after saving a woman and her dog from drowning in a frozen pond in Central Park. Since Mama's death, Ty'ree has been Lafayette and Charlie's legal guardian. Lafayette asks Ty'ree about Mama's death. Ty'ree reminds him that she died of insulin shock two years ago; when Lafayette found her, she was already dead. While Ty'ree cooks, Lafayette dozes, dreaming of his great-aunt Cecile in South Carolina. In his dream, he fishes a rainbow trout from a stream, but Newcharlie knocks it out of his hand.

Over dinner, Ty'ree suggests watching a movie. They remember when Charlie tried to save a dog that had been hit by a car. Lafayette and Ty'ree take the subway to Fourteenth Street, where the sights remind Lafayette that they are poor. When Lafayette was a baby, they went to Bayamón, Puerto Rico, for their grandmother's funeral; Mama promised they would visit again, but Charlie never believed they would have enough money. Ty'ree asks Lafayette if he ever tries to talk to Charlie. Lafayette storms off, remembering when Charlie tried to burn all their photographs of Mama.

Ty'ree admits he told Daddy to rescue the woman and her dog. Lafayette asks why nobody told him before that Ty'ree was there. Ty'ree says he wanted to make believe he wasn't; he asked Daddy to save them because he wanted a pet dog himself.

Early in the morning, Ty'ree wakes Lafayette from a dream about fighting a rainbow trout: Charlie is badly hurt and in police custody. Officer Joseph says Charlie was caught riding in a stolen car. He releases Charlie with a warning.

Outside in the rain, Charlie explains he thought Aaron was taking him to a party. Instead it was a gang initiation. Charlie was expected to fight but refused. An older guy offered to take Charlie home, then beat him. Charlie says he never wants to go back.

Late that afternoon, Lafayette goes to the park with his friends Smitty and PJ. They encounter Aaron, who is wearing gang colors. When Aaron asks about Charlie, Lafayette says that Charlie doesn't need colors to be bad.

When Lafayette returns home, he meets Charlie sitting on their stoop. Lafayette starts to go upstairs, but a vision of Mama stops him. He returns to the stoop. He tells Charlie that Mama woke up the morning she died. The second time the paramedics shocked her heart, Mama's eyes opened and her lips moved; then she died. Charlie says he robbed the candy store so they could visit Bayamón. Ty'ree arrives, and the three brothers sit on the stoop together, remembering Mama.

== Characters ==
- Lafayette, the narrator, turned twelve a few weeks before the events of the novel. He feels responsible for his mother's death.
- Charlie is the fifteen-year old middle brother. When he was younger, he used to pray for animals. He once found a dog that had been struck by a car and had trouble coping with its death. Three years ago, he robbed a candy store and was sent to Rahway Home for Boys. His mother died only a few months after he began his time at Rahway. His time at Rahway changed him, and since then, Lafayette has called him Newcharlie.
- Ty'ree is the oldest brother and the legal guardian of Lafayette and Charlie. Before his mother's death, he had planned to attend MIT. He is 22 and works as the mailroom manager at a publishing house.
- Mama was the mother of Lafayette, Charlie, and Ty'ree. She was born in Bayamón, Puerto Rico, and her real name was Milagro, Spanish for "Miracle." Two years ago, she died of insulin shock, but sometimes Lafayette imagines he can still see her.
- Daddy was the father of Lafayette, Charlie, and Ty'ree. When Mama was pregnant with Lafayette, he died of hypothermia after rescuing a woman and her dog from a frozen pond in Central Park. He appears only in flashbacks.
- Aunt Cecile is Lafayette's great aunt. She lives in South Carolina, and he visits her every summer.
- Dr. Vernon was Lafayette's therapist for a year after Mama died.
- Angelina was lafayette's crush.

== Development history ==
Woodson wrote this novel in two locations, Whidbey Island off the coast of Seattle, Washington and in Olivebridge, NY. Her goal in writing the book was to create a work with no female characters and to explore what it's like to grow up poor. "I also wanted to write about how hard it is to lose someone you love—in this case, both parents—and how that pain starts shaping itself into other things sometimes like anger and isolation."

=== Publication history ===
- 2000, USA, Putnam, ISBN 0-399-23113-7, April 2000, Hardcover.
- 2001, Audio Recording read by Dulé Hill. Listening Library, ISBN 0-8072-0525-7.2 cassettes. 2:27 hrs.

== Awards and nominations ==
- Coretta Scott King Author Award
- Los Angeles Times Book Prize
- ALA Best Book for Young Adults

== Adaptations ==
A six-episode television series based on the novel premiered on Noggin's teen block, The N, in February 2005.

In 2001, the book was released as an audiobook. Actor Dulé Hill, was given positive reviews for his narration due to his use of staccato, halting vocalizations which underlined the uncertainty of the characters. The abrupt delivery is then contrasted to his softer voice when speaking the memories of the boy's mother. "Hill's narrative style lends a necessary strength to this gritty story of survival in the face of enormous odds." Publishers Weekly's review also called Hill's performance 'powerful' and commends him for his delivery, which adds resonance to Woodson's message of love and hope.
