= Jacqueline Woodson =

American writer (born 1963)

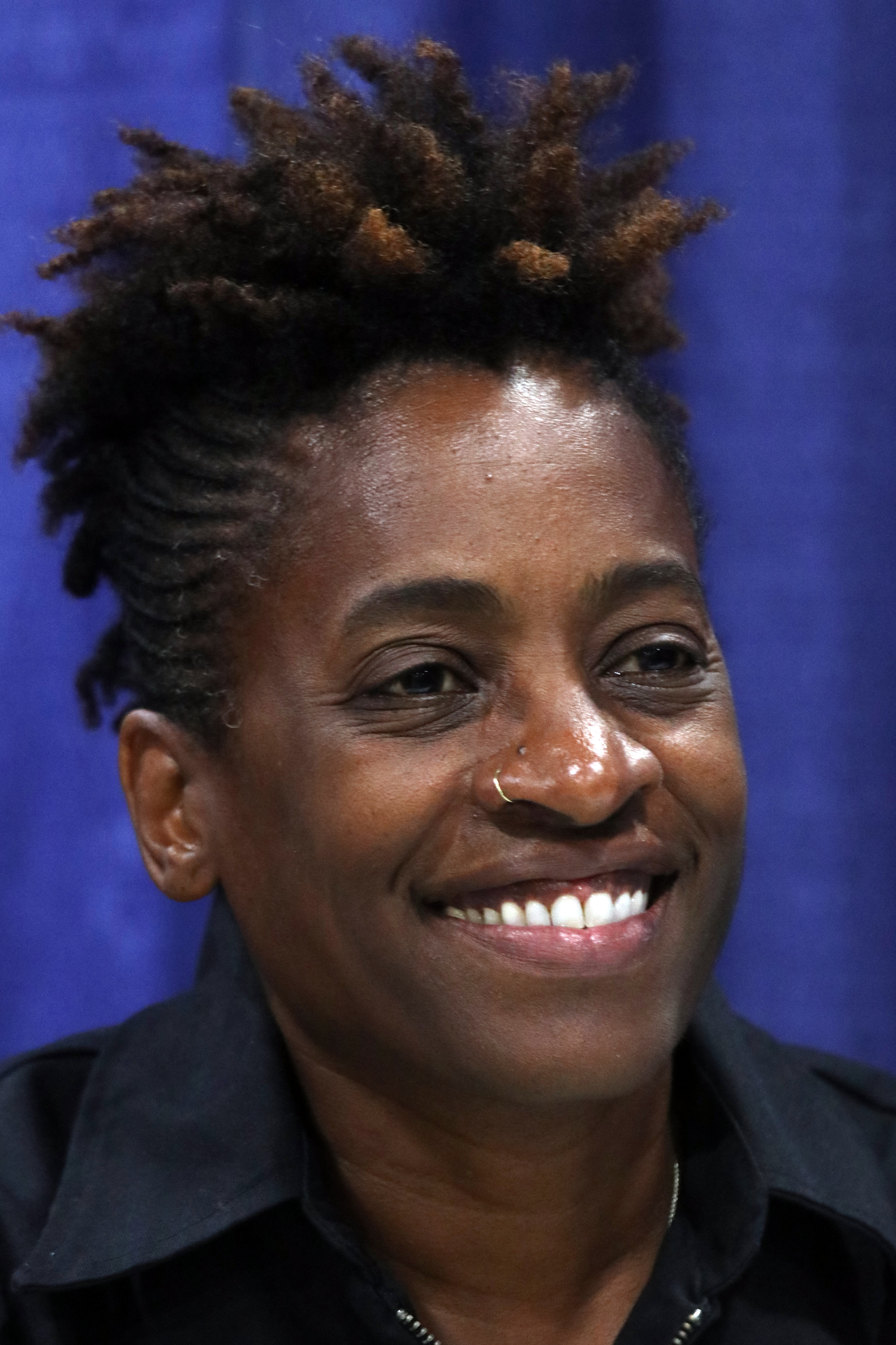
- Woodson at the 2018 U.S. National Book Festival
- Born: Jacqueline Amanda Woodson; February 12, 1963 (age 63); Columbus, Ohio, U.S.
- Education: Adelphi University; The New School
- Occupation: Writer
- Partner: Juliet Widloff
- Children: 2
- Writing career
- Period: 1990–present
- Genre: Young adult fiction
- Subject: African-American literature
- Notable works: Miracle's Boys (2000); Show Way (2006); Feathers (2007); After Tupac and D Foster (2008); Brown Girl Dreaming (2014)
- Notable awards: National Book Award; 2014; National Ambassador for Young People's Literature; 2018; MacArthur Fellowship; 2020
- Website: jacquelinewoodson.com

Jacqueline Amanda Woodson (born February 12, 1963) is an American writer of books for children and young adolescents. She is best known for Miracle's Boys, and her Newbery Honor-winning titles Brown Girl Dreaming, After Tupac and D Foster, Feathers, and Show Way. After serving as the Young People's Poet Laureate from 2015 to 2017, she was named the National Ambassador for Young People's Literature, by the Library of Congress, for 2018 to 2019. Her novel Another Brooklyn was shortlisted for the 2016 National Book Award for Fiction. She accepted the Astrid Lindgren Memorial Award in 2018 and the Hans Christian Andersen Award in 2020. She was named a MacArthur Fellow in 2020.

== Early years ==
Jacqueline Woodson was born in Columbus, Ohio, and lived in Nelsonville, Ohio, before her family moved south. During her early years she lived in Greenville, South Carolina, before moving to Brooklyn at about the age of seven. She also states where she lives in her autobiography, Brown Girl Dreaming. As a child, Woodson enjoyed telling stories and always knew she wanted to be a writer. Her favorite books when she was young were Hans Christian Andersen's "The Little Match Girl" and Mildred D. Taylor's Roll of Thunder, Hear My Cry.

== Writing career ==
[I wanted] to write about communities that were familiar to me and people that were familiar to me. I wanted to write about communities of color. I wanted to write about girls. I wanted to write about friendship and all of these things that I felt like were missing in a lot of the books that I read as a child.

After college, Woodson went to work for Kirchoff/Wohlberg, a children's publishing company. She helped to write the California standardized reading tests and caught the attention of Liza Pulitzer-Voges, a children's book agent at the same company. Although the partnership did not work out, it did get Woodson's first manuscript out of a drawer. She then enrolled in Bunny Gable's children's book writing class at The New School, where Bebe Willoughby, an editor at Delacorte, heard a reading from Last Summer with Maizon and requested the manuscript. Delacorte bought the manuscript, but Willoughby left the company before editing it and so Wendy Lamb took over and saw Woodson's first book published.

=== Inspirations ===
Woodson split her youth between South Carolina and Brooklyn. In an interview with Jennifer M. Brown, she recounted how "The South was so lush and so slow-moving and so much about community. The city was thriving and fast-moving and electric. Brooklyn was so much more diverse: on the block where I grew up, there were German people, people from the Dominican Republic, people from Puerto Rico, African-Americans from the South, Caribbean-Americans, Asians."

When asked to name her literary influences in an interview with journalist Hazel Rochman, Woodson responded: "Two major writers for me are James Baldwin and Virginia Hamilton. It blew me away to find out Virginia Hamilton was a sister like me. Later, Nikki Giovanni had a similar effect on me. I feel that I learned how to write from Baldwin. He was onto some future stuff, writing about race and gender long before people were comfortable with those dialogues. He would cross class lines all over the place, and each of his characters was remarkably believable. I still pull him down from my shelf when I feel stuck." Other early influences included Toni Morrison's The Bluest Eye and Sula, and the work of Rosa Guy, as well as her high-school English teacher, Mr. Miller. Louise Meriwether was also named.

=== Style ===
Woodson is known for writing intricate details of physical landscapes into her books. She places boundaries everywhere—social, economic, physical, sexual, racial—then has her characters break through both the physical and psychological boundaries to create a strong and emotional story. She is also known for her optimism and has said that she dislikes books that do not offer hope. She has offered the novel Sounder as an example of a "bleak" and "hopeless" novel. On the other hand, she enjoyed A Tree Grows in Brooklyn. Even though the family was exceptionally poor, the characters experienced "moments of hope and sheer beauty". She uses this philosophy in her own writing, saying: "If you love the people you create, you can see the hope there."

As a writer she consciously writes for a younger audience. There are authors who write about adolescence or from a youth's point of view, but their work is intended for adult audiences. Woodson writes about childhood and adolescence with an audience of youth in mind. In an interview on National Public Radio (NPR) she said, "I'm writing about adolescents for adolescents. And I think the main difference is when you're writing to a particular age group, especially a younger age group, you're — the writing can't be as implicit. You're more in the moment. They don't have the adult experience from which to look back. So you're in the moment of being an adolescent ... and the immediacy and the urgency is very much on the page, because that's what it feels like to be an adolescent. Everything is so important, so big, so traumatic. And all of that has to be in place for them."

=== Teaching ===
Woodson has, in turn, influenced many other writers, including An Na, who credits her as being her first writing teacher. She also teaches teens at the National Book Foundation's summer writing camp where she co-edits the annual anthology of their combined work. She was also a visiting fellow at the American Library in Paris in spring of 2017.

== Themes ==
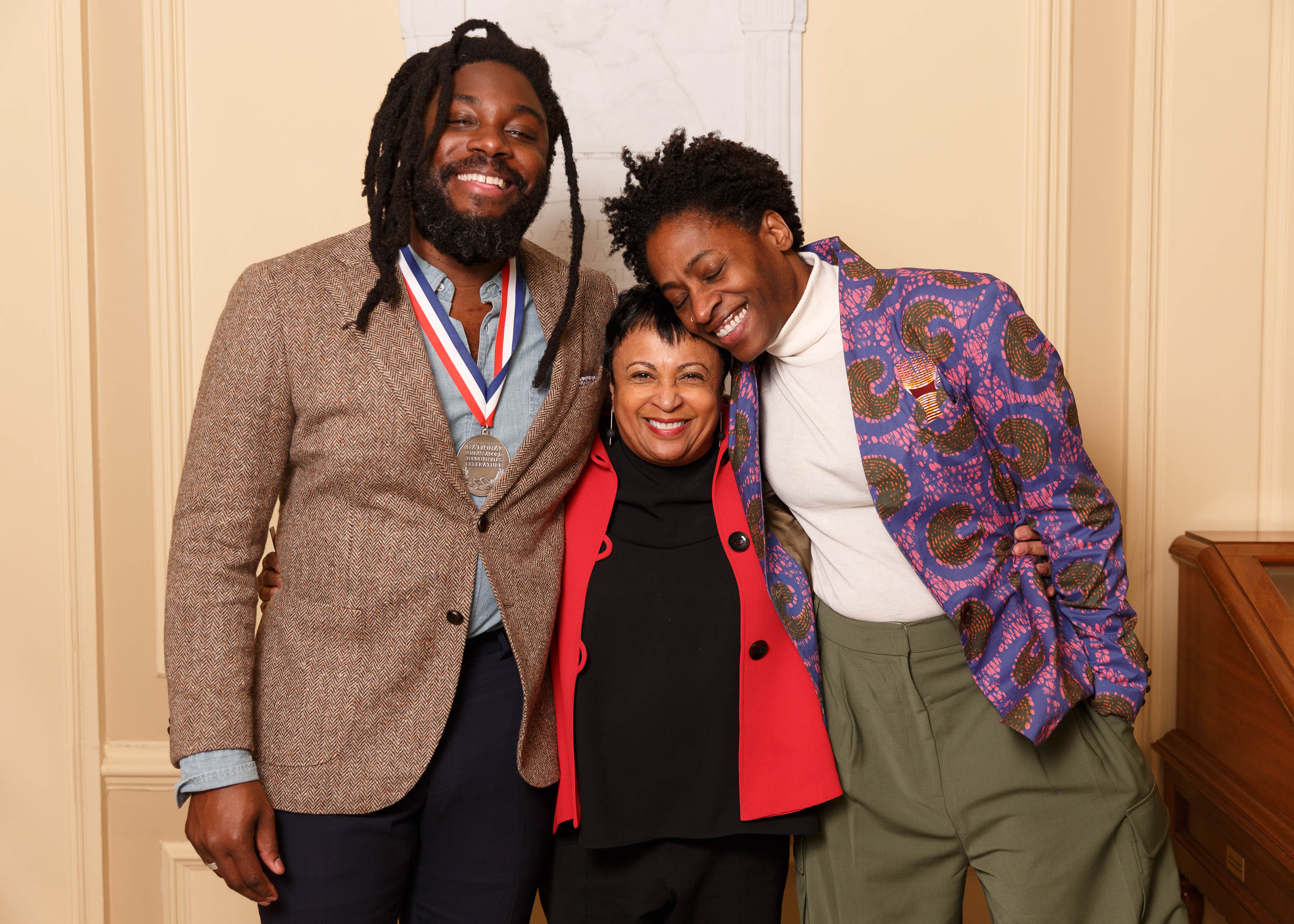
Woodson along with writer Jason Reynolds and Librarian of Congress Carla Hayden in January 2020

Some reviewers have labeled Woodson's writings as "issue-related", but she believes that her books address universal questions. She tackled uncommon and taboo subjects when originally published, including interracial couples, teenage pregnancy and homosexuality. She often does this with sympathetic characters put into realistic situations. Woodson states that her interests lie in exploring many different perspectives through her writings, not in forcing her views onto others.

Woodson has several themes that appear in many of her novels. She explores issues of gender, class and race as well as family and history. She is known for using these common themes in ground-breaking ways. While many of her characters are given labels that make them "invisible" to society, Woodson is most often writing about their search for self rather than a search for equality or social justice.

=== Gender ===
Only The Notebooks of Melanin Sun, Miracle's Boys, and Locomotion are written from a male perspective. The rest of Woodson's works feature female narrators. However, her 2009 small story "Trev", published in How Beautiful the Ordinary: Twelve Stories of Identity, features a transgender male narrator.

=== African-American society and history ===
Black women have been everywhere--building the railroads, cleaning the kitchens, starting revolutions, writing poetry, leading voter registration drives and leading slaves to freedom. We've been there and done that. I want the people who have come before me to be part of the stories that I'm telling, because if it weren't for them, I wouldn't be telling stories.

In her 2003 novel, Coming on Home Soon, she explores both race and gender within the historical context of World War II.

The Other Side is a poetic look at race through two young girls, one black and one white, who sit on either side of the fence that separates their worlds.

In November 2014, Daniel Handler, the master of ceremonies at the National Book Awards, made a joke about watermelons when Woodson received an award. In a New York Times Op-Ed published shortly thereafter, "The Pain of the Watermelon Joke," Woodson explained that "in making light of that deep and troubled history" with his joke, Daniel Handler had come from a place of ignorance. She underscored the need for her mission to "give people a sense of this country's brilliant and brutal history, so no one ever thinks they can walk onto a stage one evening and laugh at another's too often painful past."

Red at the Bone (2019), a novel, weaves together stories of three generations of one Black family, including the trauma resulting from the Tulsa Race Massacre and the September 11 attacks.

=== Economic status ===
The Dear One is notable for dealing with the differences between rich and poor within the black community.

=== Sexual identity ===
The House You Pass on the Way is a novel that touches on gay identity through the main characters of Staggerlee.

Staggerlee knows who she is for the most part, but her friend Trout is struggling, conforming, trying to fit in somewhere. I wish I had had this book when I was a kid and trying to fit in while being a tomboy and so unfeminine.

In The Dear One Woodson introduces a strongly committed lesbian relationship between Marion and Bernadette. She then contrasts it to the broken straight family that results in a teenager from Harlem named Rebecca moving in with them and their 12-year-old daughter, Feni.

== Critical response ==
Last Summer with Maizon, Woodson's first book, was praised by critics for creating positive female characters and the touching portrayal of the close eleven-year-old friends. Reviewers also commented on its convincing sense of place and vivid character relationships. The next two books in the trilogy, Maizon at Blue Hill and Between Madison and Palmetto, were also well received for their realistic characters and strong writing style. The issues of self-esteem and identity are addressed throughout the three books. A few reviewers felt that there was a slight lack of focus as the trilogy touched lightly and quickly on too many different problems in too few pages.

Announcing her as recipient of the ALA Margaret A. Edwards Award in 2006, the citation of the panel of librarians chair stated: "Woodson's books are powerful, groundbreaking and very personal explorations of the many ways in which identity and friendship transcend the limits of stereotype."

In October 2020, Woodson won a MacArthur Fellowship, commonly known as a "Genius Grant." The MacArthur Foundation recognized her for "redefining children’s and young adult literature in works that reflect the complexity and diversity of the world we live in while stretching young readers’ intellectual abilities and capacity for empathy." Her books "evoke the hopefulness and power of human connection even as they tackle difficult issues." She has stated that she plans to use the grant money to expand Baldwin for the Arts, the residency program for people of color she founded.

== Censorship ==
Some of the topics covered in Woodson's books raise flags for many censors. Homosexuality, child abuse, harsh language and other content have led to issues with censorship. In an interview on NPR Woodson said that she uses very few curse words in her books and that the issues adults have with her subject matter say more about what they are uncomfortable with than it does what their students should be thinking about. She suggests that people look at the various outside influences teens have access to today, then compare that to the subject matter in her books.

== Personal life ==
Woodson lives in Park Slope, Brooklyn, with her partner Juliet Widoff, a physician. The couple have two children, a daughter and a son.

== Awards and honors ==
- 1995 Coretta Scott King Honor for I Hadn’t Meant to Tell You This
- 1996 Coretta Scott King Honor for From the Notebooks of Melanin Sun
- 2001 Coretta Scott King Award for Miracle's Boys
- ALA Best Book for Young Adults in 1998, 2000, 2003, 2004 and 2005
- 2004 Coretta Scott King Honor for Locomotion
- 2005 YALSA Quick Picks for Reluctant Young Adult Readers for Behind You
- 2006 Margaret A. Edwards Award
- 2006 Newbery Honor for Show Way
- 2008 Newbery Honor for Feathers
- 2009 Newbery Honor for After Tupac and D Foster
- 2009 Josette Frank Award for After Tupac and D Foster
- 2009 Pennsylvania Young Reader's Choice Awards for Peace Locomotion
- 2009 Keystone to Reading Book Award for Peace Locomotion
- 2013 Coretta Scott King Honor for Each Kindness
- 2013 Jane Addams Children's Book Award - Book for Younger Children for Each Kindness
- 2014 Hans Christian Andersen Award, U.S. nominee
- 2014 National Book Award in Young People's Literature for Brown Girl Dreaming
- 2015 Coretta Scott King Award for Brown Girl Dreaming
- 2015 Young People's Poet Laureate by the Poetry Foundation
- 2015 Langston Hughes Medal, The City College of New York
- 2015 Newbery Honor for Brown Girl Dreaming
- 2015 NAACP Image Award for Outstanding Literary Work In Youth/Teens Fiction for Brown Girl Dreaming
- 2015 Robert F. Sibert Honor for Brown Girl Dreaming
- 2016 Honorary Doctorate of Humane Letters at Adelphi University
- 2017 May Hill Arbuthnot Honor Lecture at the American Library Association, recognizes significant contribution to children's literature.
- 2017 NAACP Image Award for Outstanding Literary Work In Fiction for Another Brooklyn
- 2018–19 National Ambassador for Young People's Literature for the Library of Congress.
- 2018 Astrid Lindgren Memorial Award
- 2018 Children's Literature Legacy Award
- 2019 NAACP Image Award for Outstanding Literary Work In Youth/Teens for Harbor Me
- 2019 Jane Addams Children's Book Award - Book for Younger Children for The Day You Begin
- 2019 Goodread's Choice Award Best Fiction Nomination for Red at the Bone
- 2020 Hans Christian Andersen Award, winner
- 2020 MacArthur Fellows Program Grant Award, winner

== Complete works ==
=== Adult novels ===
- Autobiography of a Family Photo (1995)
- Another Brooklyn (2016)
- Red at the Bone (2019)
- Remember Us (2023) (ISBN 978-0-399-54546-7)

=== Middle grade titles ===
- Last Summer with Maizon (1990)
- Maizon at Blue Hill (1992)
- Between Madison and Palmetto (1993)
- Feathers (2007)
- After Tupac and D Foster (2008)
- Peace Locomotion (2009)
- Locomotion (2010), verse novel
- Brown Girl Dreaming (2014), verse novel
- Harbor Me (2018)
- Before the Ever After (2020)

=== Young adult titles ===
- The Dear One (1990)
- I Hadn't Meant to Tell You This (1994)
- From the Notebooks of Melanin Sun (1995)
- The House You Pass on the Way (1997)
- If You Come Softly (1998)
- Lena (1999)
- Miracle's Boys (2000)
- Hush (2002)
- Behind You (2004)
- Beneath a Meth Moon (2012)
- The Letter Q: Queer Writers' Notes to Their Younger Selves (2012) (Contributor)

=== Illustrated works ===
- Martin Luther King, Jr. and His Birthday (nonfiction), illus. Floyd Cooper (1990)
- Book Chase, illus. Steve Cieslawski (1994)
- We Had a Picnic This Sunday Past, illus. Diane Greenseid (1997)
- Sweet, Sweet Memory, illus. Floyd Cooper (2000)
- The Other Side, illus. E. B. Lewis (2001)
- Visiting Day, illus. James Ransome (2002)
- Our Gracie Aunt, illus. Jon J. Muth (2002)
- Coming on Home Soon, illus. E. B. Lewis (2003)
- Show Way, illus. Hudson Talbott (2006)
- Pecan Pie Baby, illus. Sophie Blackall (2010)
- Each Kindness, illus. E. B. Lewis (2012)
- This Is the Rope, illus. James Ransome (2013)
- The Day You Begin, illus. Rafael López (2018)
- The Year We Learned to Fly, illus. Rafael López (2022)
- The World Belonged To Us, illus by Leo Espinosa (2022)

== Adaptations ==
=== Film ===
Filmmaker Spike Lee and others made Miracle's Boys into a miniseries, airing in 2005.

=== Audio recordings ===
- I Hadn't Meant to Tell You This, Recorded Books, 1999
- Lena, Recorded Books, 1999
- Miracle's Boys, Listening Library, 2001
- Locomotion, Recorded Books, 2003
- Show Way, Weston Woods, 2012
- Brown Girl Dreaming, Penguin Audio, 2014
- If You Come Softly, Listening Library, 2018
- Harbor Me, Listening Library, 2018
- The Day You Begin, Listening Library, 2018
- Visiting Day, Listening Library, 2018
- Before Her, part of "The One" series, Brilliance Publishing, 2019
- Red at the Bone, Penguin Audio, 2019

== See also ==
- List of winners of the National Book Award
