= Brown Girl Dreaming =

2014 book by Jacqueline Woodson

- Author: Jacqueline Woodson
- Language: English
- Genre: Children's literature, Poetry, Autobiography
- Publisher: Penguin Group
- Publication date: August 28, 2014
- Publication place: United States
- Media type: Print
- Pages: 336
- Awards: 2015 Coretta Scott King Author Award; National Book Award for Young People's Literature; NAACP Image Award; Newbery Honor
- ISBN: 0399252517

Brown Girl Dreaming is a 2014 adolescent verse memoir written by Jacqueline Woodson. It tells the story of the author's early childhood life growing up as an African American girl in the 1960s and depicts the events that led her to become a writer. The book has been considered one of the exemplary pieces of modern children's literature by critics who have analyzed the book, and it has gained a positive reception. It has won multiple awards, including a Newbery Honor, and National Book Award.

== Genre ==
Brown Girl Dreaming is considered to belong in the category of children's middle-grade literature, and it is also classified as a memoir since the content directly relates to real events that happened in the author's life. The book is written in free verse and haiku. Because of this, scholar Flynn Richard argues that the genre of the book is best described as a verse memoir rather than a verse novel and that this book is an important example of a hybrid form for an adolescent audience. Another scholar, Giselle Anatol, argued that the book could be considered a work of modern gothic fiction due to the presence of ghosts in the form of her departed family members throughout the novel. Since the book also tracks the author's introduction to writing as a creative endeavor, this book has also been classified as a Künstlerroman. Woodson herself commented on the form of the book as a collection of poems in an interview, stating that her intention behind this choice was to make poetry more "accessible" to all readers regardless of ability.

== Plot ==
Jacqueline was born on February 12, 1963, in Columbus, Ohio. She is named after her father, Jack, and is nicknamed "Jackie." She lives in Ohio with her mother, father, brother and sister. Every winter, the family trips to Greenville, South Carolina, where her maternal grandparents live. They take the bus, where they must sit in the back because of specialized segregation described in the book. This type of racialised treatment is different from what the children are used to in Ohio, but Jackie's mother reminds them they are "as good as anybody." Jackie's parents fight a lot, and they separate right after her first birthday. Jackie's mother takes the children to live in Greenville with her parents.

She spends most of her early childhood years in South Carolina, where her position as a grandchild greatly shaped her identity. She forms a close relationship with her Grandfather, known to most as Grandpa Gunnar. He works at a printing press with white men who call him by his first name instead of his earned title and sometimes do not listen to his orders. Her Grandma Georgiana is a Jehovah's Witness, and she raised Jackie and her siblings in the faith. Jackie comes to know the days of the week because of the religious activities on each one, such as Bible Study on Mondays and Tuesdays and Ministry School on Thursdays.

The children acclimate to the South and the cultural tendencies. Still, their mother is wary of them becoming "too Southern" and corrects their form of speech whenever they say things like "y'all" or "ain't" because it reminds her of the subservient role Blacks were forced into due to slavery. Jackie also notices some instances of racial conflicts, such as sit-ins and marches protesting segregation laws. Her family teaches her to stand up for what she believes in but cautions her against violence. Her mother travels to New York for a weekend trip and returns inspired to move her family there. She leaves again for an extended period, and Jackie and her siblings stay with their grandparents until she returns a year later. When she returns, she has another baby boy with her named Roman.

In New York, Jackie and her family live in an apartment in Brooklyn. Her mother's sister, Aunt Kay, lives in the upstairs apartment and forms a close relationship with Jackie. One day, she falls down the stairs when chasing Jackie and dies from the accident. Jackie attends public school in New York and has a difficult time reading. Her older sister is "gifted," but Jackie takes much longer to read. After writing her name all on her own for the first time, however, she falls in love with the writing process and decides she can write anything she would like. She does not stand for the Pledge of Allegiance at school because it goes against the religious beliefs of a Jehovah's Witness.

She befriends Maria, a girl from Puerto Rico, and they learn about female friendship from one another. The family also makes trips to South Carolina to visit her grandparents, but each time they go back, Grandpa Gunnar's health deteriorates due to lung cancer. He eventually passes away, and Grandma Georgina moves to New York. The book ends with Jackie identifying herself as a writer and encouraging others to make themselves into whatever they want.

== Analysis ==
In her book Twenty-First Century Feminism in Children's and Adolescent Literature, author Roberta Seelinger Trites includes Brown Girl Dreaming in the second chapter of the book, "Intersectionalities and Multiplicities." Race, age, social class, gender, and religion intersect through Jackie's story, with the language of the book as the "primary source" of this intersectional nature of her character. According to Trites, this multiplicity allows Woodson to understand her identity.

Krystal Howard included Brown Girl Dreaming as one of the three main books in her paper "Influence Poetry and Found Poetry," where Howard reflects on Langston Hughes as a major source of inspiration for Woodson's poems. The author notes how Woodson sometimes "repurposes" lines of poetry from Hughes to track her own experience as an aspiring writer and eventual poet, which shows the importance of the "practice of influence" for creative projects. In another paper by Howard focusing solely on Brown Girl Dreaming, she calls this collection of paratextual elements the "collage effect." In this paper, she also comments on how Woodson expands the temporal boundaries of her book by using old traditions to help shape her contemporary story.

Richard Flynn also focuses on inspiration in Brown Girl Dreaming in his paper "Why Genre Matters: A Case for the Importance of Aesthetics in the Verse Memoirs of Marilyn Nelson and Jacqueline Woodson," but his focus is mainly on how other texts and things she hears as a child impact her specifically and shape her learning experience. He points out that the haikus in the book serve as examples of how the author links "listening, memory, and writing" together to learn how to read and write.

== Reception ==
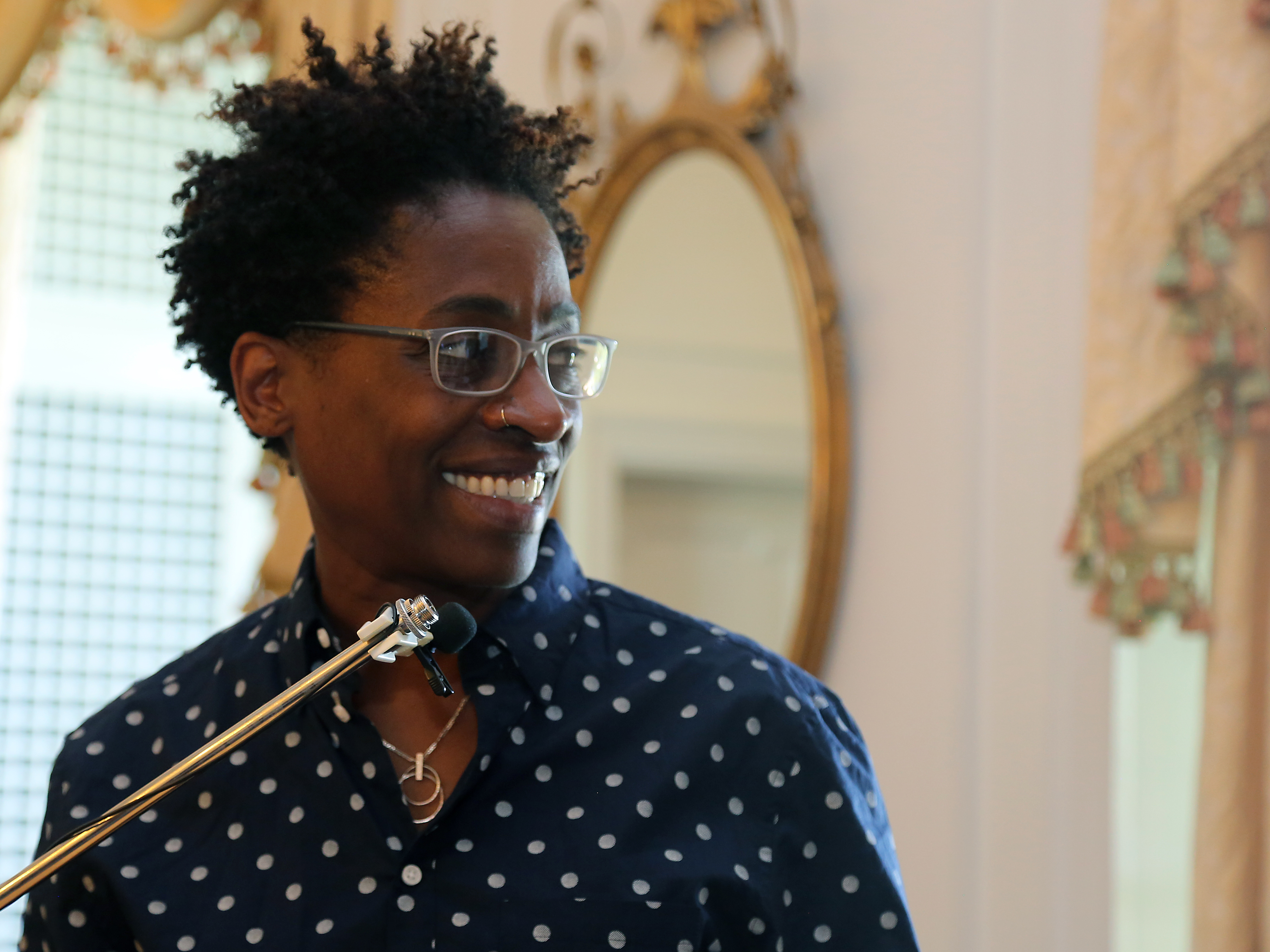
Jacqueline Woodson meets students at Stockholm International School, May 2018

After the book's publication, Brown Girl Dreaming was praised for its educational merit as a book that expands questions of ethics, relationships, and race. Ross Collin advocated using the book in an educational setting because the content helps expand students' "moral worldview" when it comes to considering ethical questions of behavior when religious beliefs impact these actions. In a New York Times review, Veronica Chambers described the book "as rich a spread as the potluck table at a family reunion" and one that leaves a lasting impression on the reader. She criticized the book's name as one that might detract some readers from picking it up, as she believes that some girls who are not brown may not think they are the intended audience for the story. Rabia Arif highlights the memoir as a reminder of the "simplicity of childhood dreams" while tackling challenging topics such as race and loss. The book also made it on the list of the BBC list of the 100 best children's books in the 21st century, placed in the 29th spot. Brown Girl Dreaming has inspired at least one literary scholarship project after its publication, where authors Jennifer Turner and Autumn Griffin use the themes in the book as a model for their feature article to highlight the dreams and goals of two African American sisters.

=== Awards ===
- National Book Award for Young People's Literature
- Coretta Scott King Award
- NAACP Image Award for Outstanding Literary Work in Young Adult Fiction
- Newbery Honor Book
