= David Katzeek =

Tlingit educator and leader

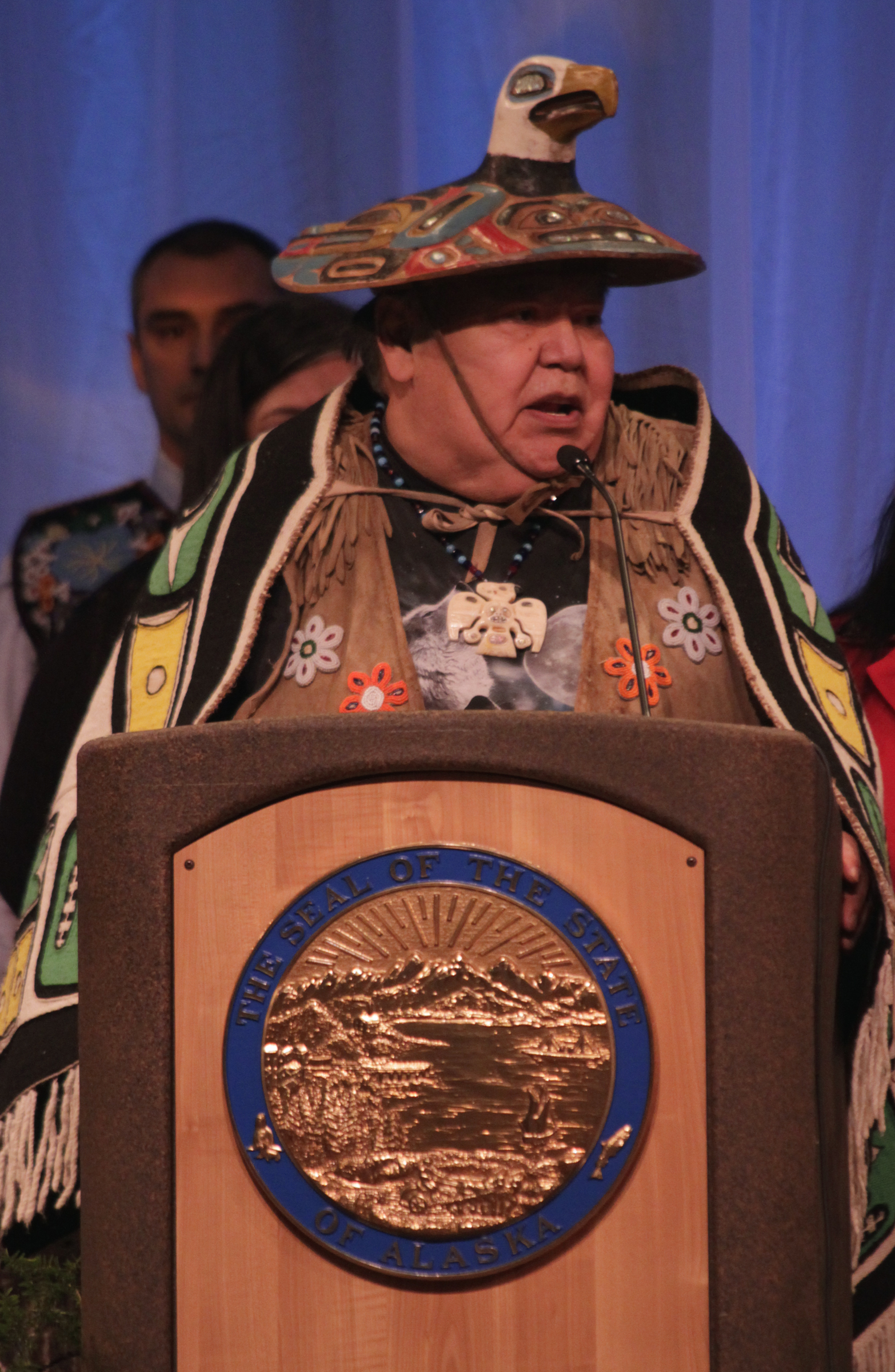
- Born: November 12, 1942; Klukwan, Alaska
- Died: October 28, 2020 (aged 77)

David G. Katzeek (1942 - 2020, Tlingit: King̱eestí) was an Tlingit educator, leader of the Shangukeidí clan, and the first president of Sealaska Heritage Institute. A singer and dancer, he helped found the Alaskan festival Celebration in the 1980s. He taught Tlingit language and culture at the Juneau School District and the University of Alaska Southeast. His memorial service, held over Zoom due to the COVID-19 pandemic, had over 2,000 attendees.

== Early life ==
David G. Katzeek was born in Klukwan, Alaska, on November 12, 1942, to mother Anna Klanott Katzeek and father George J. Katzeek. A member of the Shangukeidí; (Thunderbird) clan, part of the Eagle moiety, Katzeek grew up in Juneau, Alaska. He learned Tlingit from his parents and grandparents; growing up, Katzeek lived in a society where Tlingit children were not taught to language "to help our children become competitive in today's society". He remembered federal anthropologists coming to Juneau, asking questions and attempting to document the Tlingit culture, customs, and people.

Katzeek attended Juneau-Douglas High School, graduating in 1962. He attended Griswald Business College. In 1971, he began working as a consultant, specializing in Tlingit culture. He also worked as a gillnetter and was made leader of his Shangukeidí clan, in Klukwan.

== Sealaska and Tlingit language advocacy ==
Katzeek ran for the Sealaska board of directors in 1976 as a dissident candidate, alongside Albert Kookesh. Running under the banner "Operation David and Goliath", Katzeek withdrew at the last minute to avoid splitting the vote and Kookesh, guarenteeing him a spot. He ran again in 1977, this time successfully, under the banner "Operation Joshua and Caleb".

When the Sealaska Corporation created the Sealaska Heritage Institute in 1981, Katzeek was appointed as the institute's first president. The next year, he helped to establish Celebration, an Alaskan festival focused on promoting the preservation of Tlingit, Haida, and Tshimshian language and culture. He spoke and performed regularly at future festivals. In 1985, he was elected CEO of the institute. He worked as their president for twelve years; he left the institute at the end of 1992, saying "I've been with the foundation 11½ years and I personally just feel it's time to move on ahead and go on to other activities".

Katzeek began working with the Juneau School District in the 1990s, establishing Tlingit language education programs and curriculums. He wanted the Tlingit language to be taught in schools like Russian or Spanish; in 1993, he held a one hour class once a week at a middle school, teaching seventh graders the language. He also taught Tlingit and language culture classes at the University of Alaska Southeast.

In 2016, the Sealaska Heritage Institute released an app to teach the Tlingit language, with Tlingit-language audio recorded by Katzeek and other native speakers.

When Juneau-Douglas High School was renamed in 2019, Katzeek took part in coming up with the new name: Yadaa.at Kalé (transl. "beautiful (mountain) face"). That same year, he was given an award by the school board for his work on their Tlingit Culture, Language, and Literacy Program. The award was presented by Andi Story, one of Juneau's two state representatives and a longtime school board member.

Katzeek was also a dancer and a singer, and performed with clan. When the Yaxté totem pole was burnt in 1992, he and his clan announced they would perform at a fundraiser to repair the totem pole.

== Death and funeral ==
Katzeek died on October 28, 2020. His death was reported by Sealaska Heritage Institute; according to its president Rosita Worl, Katzeek's cause of death was believed to be heart failure. Due to the ongoing COVID-19 pandemic, Katzeek's memorial service could not be held in person, but rather online, over Zoom. Over 2,000 people attended, including people from California and New Mexico.

Katzeek has been credited with reviving and encouraging Tlingit language and culture education and preservation in Southeast Alaska. During his life, he often spoke at important Tlingit ceremonies or events and worked on repatriating Tlingit at.óow.

== Writings ==
Katzeek co-edited a children's book about a Tlignit tale, released in 2017. Shanyaak'utlaax̲: Salmon Boy (illustrated by Michaela Goade, and edited with Johnny Marks, Hans Chester, Nora Dauenhauer, and Richard Dauenhauer) won the Best Picture Book award at the 2018 American Indian Youth Literature Awards. Marks, Chester, and the Dauenhauers had previously released an illustrated version of the same legend in 2004, also published by Sealaska, and with an audio book narrated by Katzeek.

- Marks, Johnny; Chester, Hans; Katzeek, David; Dauenhauer, Nora; Dauenhauer, Richard, eds. (2017). Shanyaak'utlaax: Salmon Boy. Baby Raven Reads Series. illustrated by Michaela Goade. Sealaska Heritage Institute. ISBN 978-1-946019-02-8.
