= Native Americans in children's literature =

Depictions

Native Americans have been featured in numerous works of children's literature. Some have been authored by non-Indigenous writers, while others have been written or contributed to by Indigenous authors.

== Children's literature about Native Americans ==
There are many works of children's literature that feature Native Americans. Some are considered classics, such as Little House on the Prairie by Laura Ingalls Wilder, and some are award winners, such as The Matchlock Gun by Walter D. Edmonds. These classics, however, contain images of Native Americans that are biased, stereotypical, and inaccurate (Reese, 2008).

Numerous studies report the predominance of positive and negative stereotypes and the pervasive tendency to present a monolithic image of Native Americans that is largely inaccurate. The majority of the books were written and illustrated by authors who are not themselves Native American, and studies of the ways they portray Native Americans indicate they mirror popular culture more than history or reality of any Native tribal nation or group (Caldwell-Wood & Mitten, 1991; Dorris, 1982; Flaste, 1982; Hirschfelder, 1993; MacCann, 1993; Reese 2001; Slapin and Seale, 1982).

Author and illustrator Paul Goble (and the adopted son of Chief Edgar Red Cloud) has written dozens of children's books that retell ancient stories. His book The Girl Who Loved Wild Horses won the Caldecott Medal in 1979. Lakota scholar Elizabeth Cook-Lynn (Cook-Lynn, 1998) and Lakota librarian Doris Seale find his retellings inaccurate. Displeasure in them led the American Indian Library Association to ask the American Library Association to withdraw "Native American Month" posters and bookmarks with his art on them in 2007. ALA complied with the request, signaling the respect accorded to scholars and practitioners who work with Native populations. However, the debate over Goble's work is far from one-sided. Many prominent Native American authors still support his contribution to the field of study. Authors—such as Joe Medicine Crow(Absaroka), Vivian Arviso Deloria (Navajo), Joseph Bruchac(Abenaki), Lauren Waukau-Villagomez (Menominee), Robert Lewis (Cherokee/ Navaho/Apache) and Albert White Hat Sr. (Lakota)—have publicly stated their support of Goble bringing traditional Native American stories to the public's attention, going so far as praising his attention to detail and his use of primary sources.

== Children's literature written or illustrated by Native Americans ==
Native Americans have a strong oral tradition of preserving their language, culture, and stories by passing them down from one generation to the next. As noted in The Oxford Encyclopedia of Children's Literature, in the entry "Native American Children's Literature", as far back as 1881, Native authors published stories for children, many that countered stereotypical portrayals. These stories appeared in magazines and books.

- In January 1881, Susette LaFlesche of the Omaha tribe wrote "Nedawi" for a children's magazine called St. Nicholas. Her Omaha name was Inshata Theumba, which, translated into English, is "Bright Eyes". Her story, "Nedawi", is about life in an Omaha hunting camp, told from the perspective of a young girl.
- Several stories by Charles Alexander Eastman appeared in St. Nicholas in 1893 and 1894. They were later published in a book called Indian Boyhood (1902, 1933, 1971), which was a favorite in Boy Scout programs. Eastman was a Dakota Indian, and his Dakota name was Ohiyesa. An illustrated children's book of Ohiyesa's childhood, Indian Boyhood: The True Story of a Sioux Upbringing edited by Michael O. Fitzgerald published by Wisdom Tales, was scheduled for release in 2016.
- In 1931, Luther Standing Bear's autobiographical My Indian Boyhood (1931) was published. He was Lakota; his Lakota name was Ota K'te. He wrote two other books that describe traditional Lakota culture: My People the Sioux (1928) and Land of the Spotted Eagle (1939).
- I am a Pueblo Indian Girl (1939) was written by 13-year-old Louise Abeita, an Isleta Pueblo girl known to her people as E-Yeh-Shure, which translates to "Blue Corn". In it, she writes about daily aspects of Pueblo Indian life and culture. The illustrations in the book were watercolors painted by Native artists like Allan Houser whose work would eventually become renowned internationally.

American Indian illustrators, too, sought to counter these stereotypical images. During the 1940s, the United States Bureau of Indian Affairs published a series of bilingual readers, known as the "Indian Life Readers", for use in U.S. Government boarding and day schools. Most of the books were written by non-Native author Ann Nolan Clark, but illustrated by Native artists from the tribe the reader was about. For example, Hoke Denetosisie said:

"The nature of the series, being concerned with Navajo life, called for illustration genuine in every sense of the word. I had to observe and incorporate in pictures those characteristics which serve to distinguish the Navajo from other tribes. Further, the setting . . . had to change to express local changes as the family moved from place to place. The domestic animals . . . had to be shown in a proper setting just as one sees them on the reservation. The sheep could not be shown grazing in a pasture, nor the horses in a stable, because such things are not Navajo."

One of the readers, initially called Third Grade Home Geography, was published by a mainstream press in 1941, retitled In My Mother's House. Illustrated by Pueblo artist Velino Herrera, it is about life in Tesuque Pueblo.

In 1954, D'Arcy McNickle, who was Chippewa Cree, published her historical novel Runner in the Sun about a teenager being trained to lead his people. In 1960, world-renowned artist Pablita Velarde of Santa Clara Pueblo retold and illustrated stories told to her by her grandfather in Old Father, the Storyteller.

During the 1970s, the American Indian Historical Society published a magazine for children titled The Wee Wish Tree. In it were short stories, poems, and essays written by Native Americans, many of them children. Also during that time, the Council on Interracial Books for Children was instrumental in publishing the work of Virginia Driving Hawk Sneve, a Rosebud Sioux. She wrote High Elks Treasure in 1972, When Thunders Spoke in 1974, and The Chichi Hoohoo Bogeyman in 1975. Sneve was awarded the National Humanities Medal in 2000.

Simon Ortiz's prose poem The People Shall Continue was published in 1977. It covers the history of Native Americans from creation to the present day, but also includes content omitted or glossed over in other narratives about the settlement of the United States. Ortiz includes the forced removal of Native peoples from their homelands, the brutal periods of early government-controlled boarding schools, and the social movements of the 1960s. Ortiz is from Acoma Pueblo.

In the 1980s, the prolific Abenaki author Joseph Bruchac began writing his books for children. In 1985, The Wind Eagle and Other Abenaki Stories was published. It was followed by picture books, traditional retellings, historical and contemporary fiction, and biography and autobiographical works. His young adult thriller, Skeleton Man, received the Sequoyah Book Award in 2004.

In the 1990s, many Native-authored books for children were published, including the work of Louise Erdrich (Ojibwa), Joy Harjo (Muscogee Creek Nation), Michael Lacapa (Apache/Hopi/Tewa), Gayle Ross (Cherokee Nation), Cynthia Leitich Smith (Muscogee Creek), Joseph McLellan (Nez Perce), N. Scott Momaday (Kiowa), Cheryl Savageau (Abenaki/Metis), Jan Waboose (Anishinaabe), and Bernelda Wheeler (Cree).

In 2007, Sherman Alexie joined the growing list of Native authors writing for children with the release of his young adult fiction The Absolutely True Diary of a Part-Time Indian. Critically acclaimed, it won the National Book Award.

== Indigenous Children's Literature in the 21st Century ==
The First Blade of Sweetgrass by Suzanne Greenlaw of the Houlton Band of Maliseet and Gabriel Frey of the Passamaquoddy Nation (Written and Published in 2021)

We Are Water Protectors by Carole Lindstrom and illustrated by Michaela Goade (Published in 2020)

The Whale Child by Keith Egawa and Chenoa Egawa (Published in 2020)

This Land by Ashley Fairbanks and illustrated by Bridget George (Published in 2024)

== Literary criticism ==
The goal of many Native children's book authors is to start unteaching the harmful and untrue stereotypes portraying Native Americans, and to reintroduce the true culture and history of their tribal affiliations. Alongside them are Native and non-Native scholars who critique classic, award-winning, best-selling books by and about Native Americans. Two examples are Slapin and Seale's Through Indian Eyes: The Native Experience in Books for Children and Seale and Slapin's A Broken Flute: The Native Experience in Books for Children. The Oyate website offers reviews of books written by or featuring Native Americans, and critiques untrue stereotypes found in these books. A Broken Flute: The Native Experience in Books or Children is a recipient of a 2006 American Book Award.

Another text is Paulette F. Molin's American Indian Themes in Young Adult Literature published in 2005 by Scarecrow Press.

Dr. Debbie Reese of Nambé Pueblo is the founder of American Indians in Children's Literature (AICL). Her blog and scholarly works seek to provide critical analyses of representations of Indigenous peoples in classic literature, such as Little House on the Prairie, as well as contemporary publications. Her blog also highlights the work of Indigenous authors and illustrators and provides educational resources for educators and families.

== See also ==
- Native Americans in popular culture
- Portrayal of Native Americans in film
