= Kelsey Mata =

American illustrator and artist

Kelsey Foote (sometimes Kelsey Mata Foote) is a Native American illustrator and producer from Ketchikan, Alaska. A member of the Tlingit tribe, she is known for her work in children's picture books and digital art that portray Indigenous characters and ways of life.

Her work debuted in the public sphere with Celebration! (2022), a book authored by Tlingit weaver Lily Hope and produced as part of the Sealaska Heritage Institute's Baby Raven Reads program, which aims to promote and preserve Indigenous languages and cultures through children's literature. In 2024, Foote and Hope were announced as recipients of the 2024 American Indian Youth Literature Awards - Picture Book Honor during the American Library Association’s Youth Media Awards, an award that "identifies and honors the best writings and illustrations for youth, by and about Native American and Indigenous peoples of North America."

Both Foote and her brother, artist Nick Alan Foote, were the selected illustrators and character designers for a long-term language revitalization project between the Central Council of the Tlingit and Haida Indian Tribes of Alaska (Tlingit & Haida), the Goldbelt Heritage Foundation, Cedar Group, and several language and culture specialists. The collaboration spans nine children’s books and animated shorts in total, entirely in the Tlingit language. The first book, Kuhaantí (2023), was released in October 2023 in Juneau, Alaska.

In August 2024, it was announced that Foote would be working alongside Cree and Taino author, Violet Duncan, on a children's picture book to be published in Spring 2027 by Nancy Paulsen Books under Penguin Random House.

== Illustrated Works ==
- Celebration! by Lily Hope and Kelsey Mata Foote. Baby Raven Reads Series. Published by the Sealaska Heritage Institute. 2022.
- Kuhaantí by George Davis, Marge Duston, Ethel Makinen, Herman Davis, and Anne Johnson. Edited and translated by Lance Twitchell. Illustrated by Nick Alan Foote and Kelsey Mata Foote. Published by Tlingit & Haida and the Goldbelt Heritage Foundation. 2023.
- Yéil ḵa Kudatankahídi by George Davis, Marge Dutson, Ruth Demmert, and Marsha Hotch. Edited and translated by Lance Twitchell. Published by Tlingit & Haida and the Goldbelt Heritage Foundation. 2024.
- Tess's Red Dress by Carolyn Roberts and Kelsey Mata Foote. Published by Medicine Wheel Publishing. 2026.
- Life is a Dance by Violet Duncan. Illustrated by Kelsey Mata Foote. To be published by Nancy Paulsen Books Imprint, Penguin Random House in Spring 2027.
