= Yaxté totem pole =

Totem pole in Juneau, Alaska

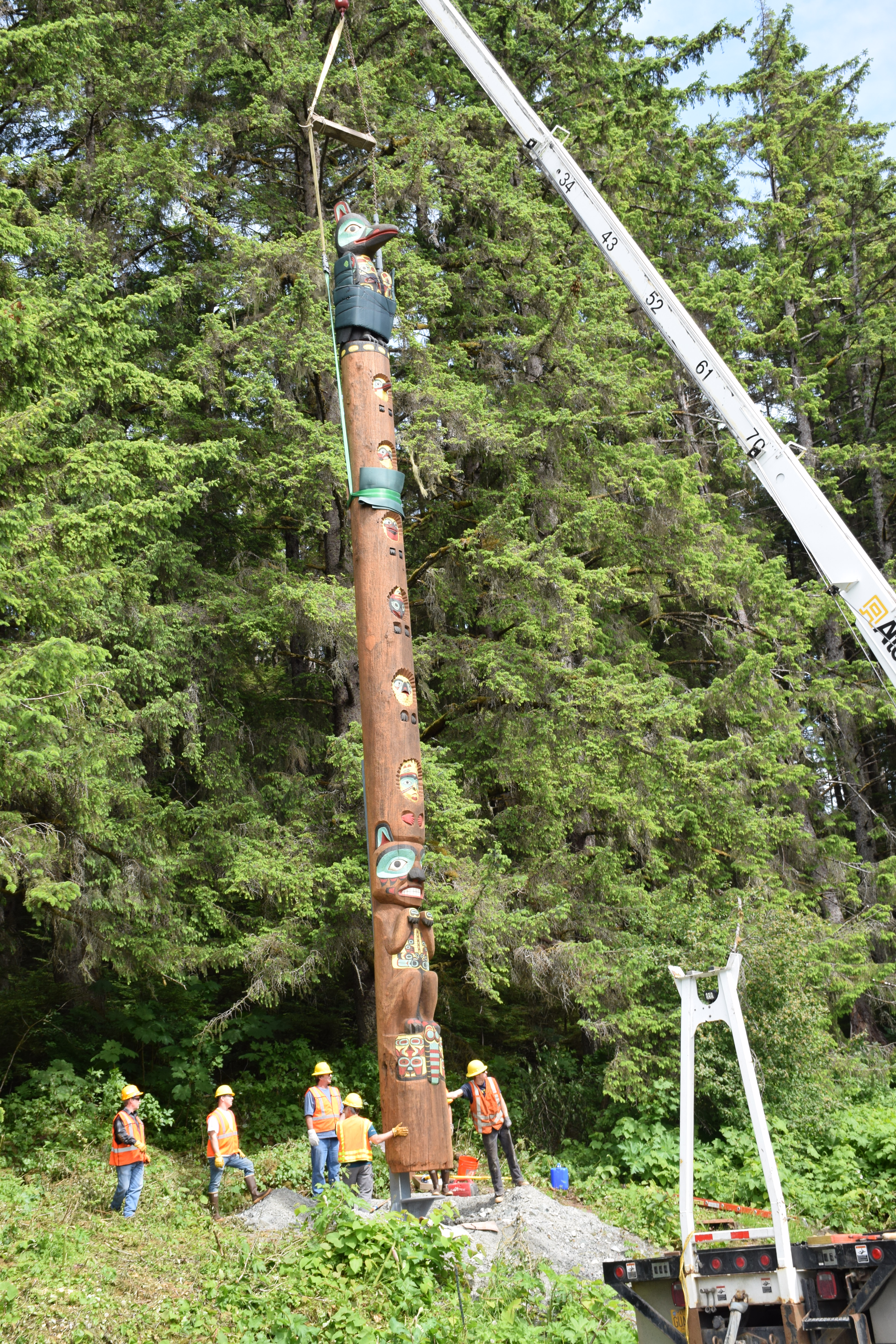
- Yaxté pole being raised in 2015
- Artist: Linn A. Forrest
- Year: 1941
- Medium: Cedar
- Location: Auke Recreation Area, Juneau, Alaska, United States; 58°22′43.5″N 134°43′16″W
- Owner: United States Forest Service

The Yaxté totem pole (Tlingit: Yaxté kootéeyaa) (Note: Also known as the Auke Bay pole, Big Dipper House totem pole, and Big Dipper totem.) is a Tlingit totem pole designed by Linn A. Forrest and carved by Frank St. Clair in 1941 as part of a Civilian Conservation Corps project in Alaska, United States. First erected in 1941, the pole has been taken down and restored on multiple occasions to repair damage from fire, rot, gunfire, insects, and woodpeckers.

Forrest designed the Yaxté totem pole based on Auke Tlingit stories involving Raven (Tlingit: Yéil), who is depicted at the top of the pole. Also shown on the pole are the faces of five birds, the face of an Auke noblewoman or princess, and a bear, representing the Big Dipper constellation (Tlingit: Yaxté). When first installed, the Yaxté pole was met with controversy and nicknamed "Barbeque Raven Pole". The pole itself is owned by the United States Forest Service and located on Glacier Highway in the Auke Recreation Center, north of Juneau, Alaska.

== Description ==
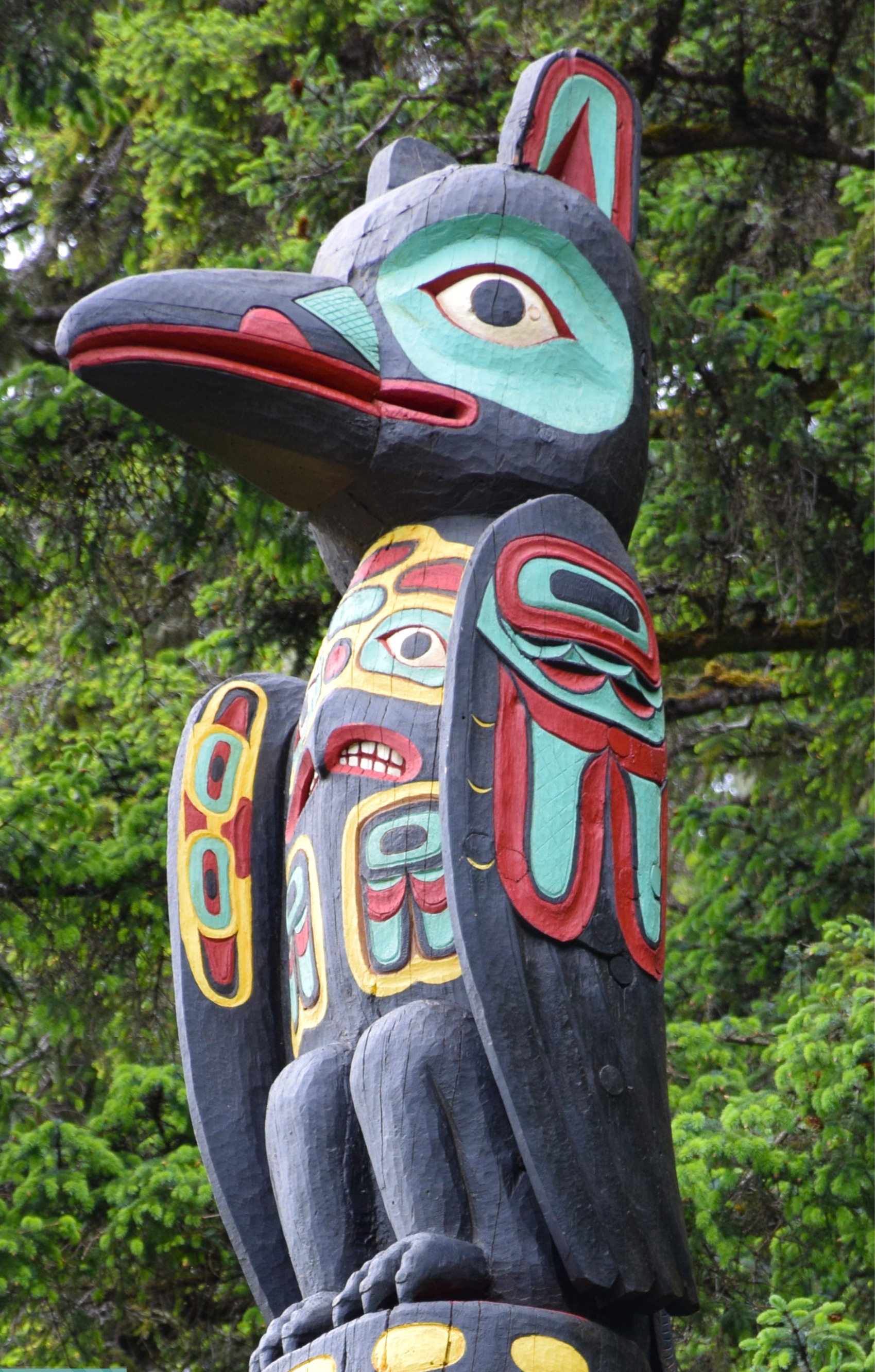
Raven on top of the Yaxté totem pole

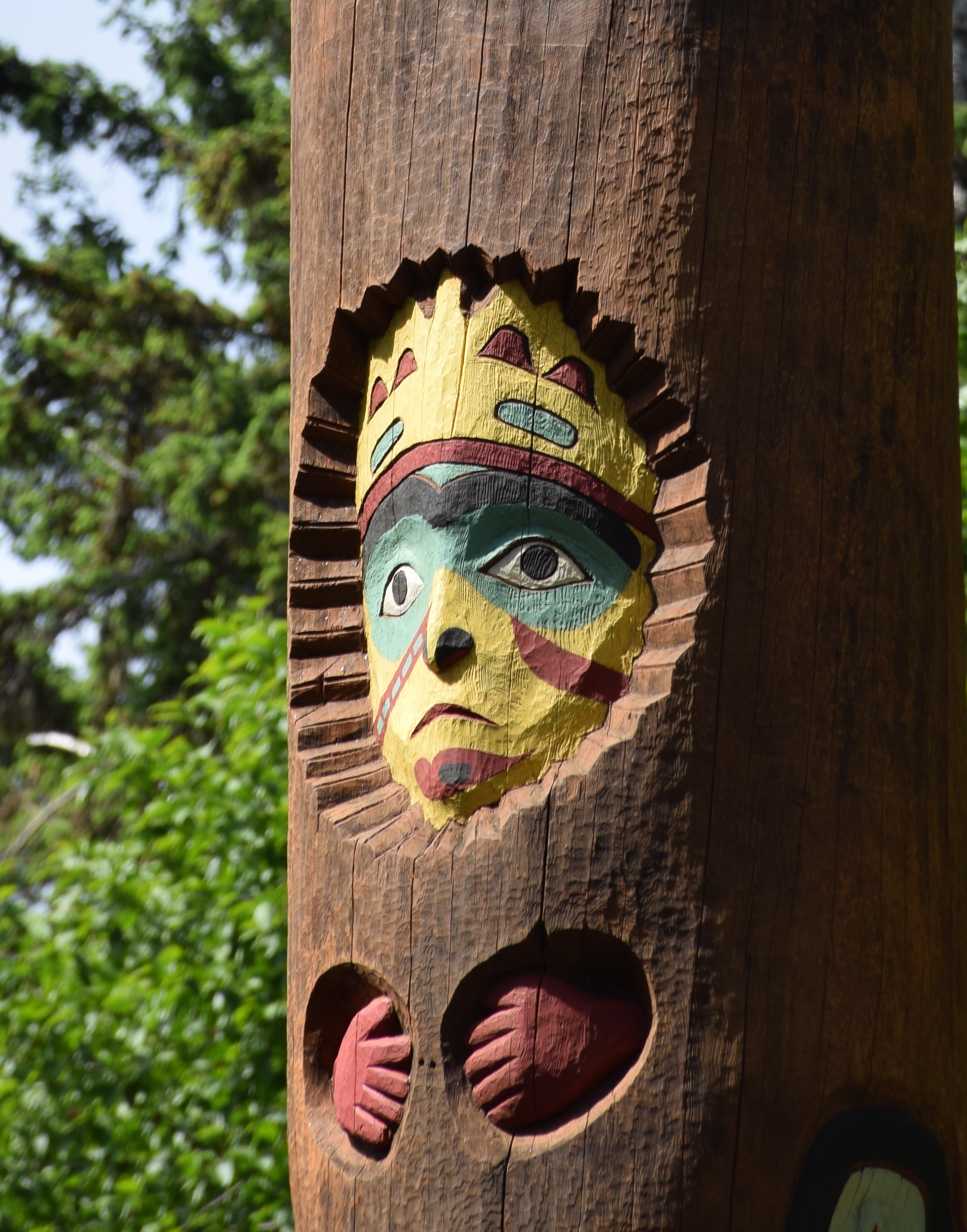
Close up of the Auke noblewoman/princess

The Yaxté totem pole measures 47 feet (14 m) (or 48 feet (15 m)) tall and weighs 4,700 pounds (2,100 kg). Made from yellow cedar, the pole is painted in colors such as red, turquoise, and yellow. Colors such as yellow and turquoise are atypical in traditional art, as is using white to mark the eyeball. Prior to 2015, the pole was capped; the metal nails used to attach the cast rusted and caused damage.

Topped with a colorful raven, the pole also incorporates the faces of five birds, the face of an Auke noblewoman or princess wearing a traditional headdress, and a bear. The bear, at the base of the pole, represents the Big Dipper (Tlingit: Yaxté), part of the constellation Ursa Major and, according to Edward L. Keithahn, an Auke clan symbol; the Yaxté house itself comes from the Raven moiety. The bear has a dragonfly on her stomach, representing the constellation or the "backbone and ribs of the Yax-te". The five birds represented as faces on the totem are, from top to bottom: Magpie, Ha-sha-kcqw (a companion to Raven, with an eagle body and human face), Robin (Tlingit: Shushk or teesk), Blue Jay (Kla-skque), and Chickadee (Yey-ku-du-hits). There is also a monster frog.

The Yaxté pole depicts Auke stories; specifically, Tlingit creation stories. These include one where Raven tricks the other bird on the pole to help him cook a salmon, then eating it all himself, and another with Raven and Ha-sha-kcqw tricking villagers away from their homes by saying people were coming to kill them, then raiding.

Located in the Auke Recreation Area, north of Juneau, on Glacier Highway, at the site of an Auke village, the Yaxté totem pole is owned and administered by the United States Forest Service Southeast.

== History ==
=== Construction ===
The Yaxté totem pole was designed by United States Forest Service architect Linn A. Forrest, as part of a Civilian Conservation Corps project. Forrest had previously worked with totem poles, and was responsible for restoring several at the Sitka National Historic Park. He drew on Auke Tribe stories he had been told; he intended for the pole to be part of a proposed "Auk Village totem park", though, due to World War II and budget constraints, the park was never created. It was one of three totem poles carved by Civilian Conservation Corps workers in Juneau; other poles included the Four Story totem and the Governor's Mansion pole.

The totem pole itself was carved in 1941 by Kelly Frank St. Clair (1913–1994), a man from the Bear Clan (Tlingit: Kaagwaantaan), part of the Eagle moiety. He was assisted by two Áak’w Tlingit men from Juneau, Edward "Ed" Kunz and Eugene King. A piece of cedar was shipped in from Ketchikan to be used for the pole; the Yaxté totem pole was erected later that same year by the Indian Division of the Civilian Conservation Corps directly into the ground at the site of an Aakʼw Ḵwáan winter village.

The pole was initially met with a measure of controversy; it was nicknamed by Alaska Natives in Juneau as the "Barbeque Raven" pole because, in the words of a 1950 United States Forest Service report, "it was made for the white people and bears no real meaning for the Tlingit". The nickname was also used by the Alaska Department of Natural Resources in an 1987 report.

=== 1992 fire and first restoration ===
On the evening of September 12, 1992, a fire was set at the Yaxté pole. It burnt the first 25 feet (7.6 m) of the totem, with extensive charring to the first four feet (1.2 m), before being extinguished. Authorities attributed the fire to diesel fuel, and the incident was investigated as arson by the Alaska State Troopers and the United States Forest Service. The totem pole was removed the next year, and a $4,000 reward offered for information leading to the arrest of the responsible party; $1,000 was donated by Alaska politicians Jim Duncan and Jerry Mackie.

The United States Forest Service considered both replacing and restoring the totem pole; they chose to restore it. The Sealaska Heritage Institute solicited donations for the repairs, raising $3,343; the remainder of the money came from the United States Forest Service. The contract to restore the Yaxté pole was given to Arnold "Arnie" Dalton (1944–2001), a Wrangell man of Tlingit and Tshimshian descent, party of the Tlingit Eagle moiety. Chosen by United States Forest Service and the Auke Tribe, he was paid $22,500 and began work in May 1993. During the restoration, he discovered over a dozen bullet holes, evidence that the totem pole had been shot at. Dalton fixed the holes and shaved off 1/4 to 1 1/2 inches (6–38 mm) of charred wood. Working from 1940s photos of the Yaxté pole, he repainted the totem pole with an indoor-outdoor latex paint, and planned to place a layer of water-repellant preservative on top. Dalton hid a time capsule in the Raven's beak; in a vacuum-packed envelope he placed a letter, a commemorative coin, and newspaper articles about the restoration.

The totem pole was re-installed on September 17, 1993. Over 300 people attended the re-installation, an event which included performances by Tlingit singers and dancers. David Katzeek, president of Sealaska Heritage, also spoke, saying "Our culture and our heritage had been scorched. Now our culture and heritage have also been restored.'" An Alaska Electric Light & Power truck was used to raise the totem back into place. As of the reinstallation, no suspect had been identified in the arson.

=== 2015 restoration ===
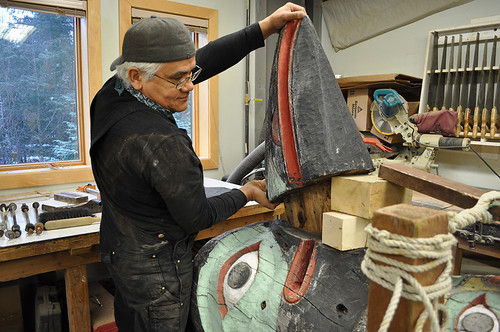
Carver Wayne Price removing Raven's beak

The Yaxté pole was removed again in 2010 due to concerns about wind, after United States Forest Service workers noticed rot and insect damage. It was found to have deteriorated with dry rot, Raven's wings and back had holes pecked by woodpeckers, pieces were broken, and there was a crack running 15 to 25 feet (4.6–7.6 m) up the totem. At between 18% and 20% moisture content when initially removed, the pole dried out inside before being kept in storage for the next several years.

Restorations began in early March 2015, and were performed by carver Wayne Price. Price was assisted by Fred Fulmer, a descendant of Frank St. Clair; Fulmer brought his daughter, granddaughter, and great-granddaughter, all descendants of St. Clair's, to help repaint the totem. Price worked for a month in a United States Forest Service warehouse repairing the totem pole, working 10 to 12 hour days. He repainted the totem pole, added lacquer to prevent further insect damage, and removed rot from the center, replacing it with fresh cedar.

The Yaxté totem pole was reinstalled on June 13, 2017, this time on a metal stand to prevent further rotting. Fulmer spoke at the installation, which involved singing, dancing, guest speeches, and was attended by people in the Juneau Tlingit community.

The pole next underwent maintenance in 2022.

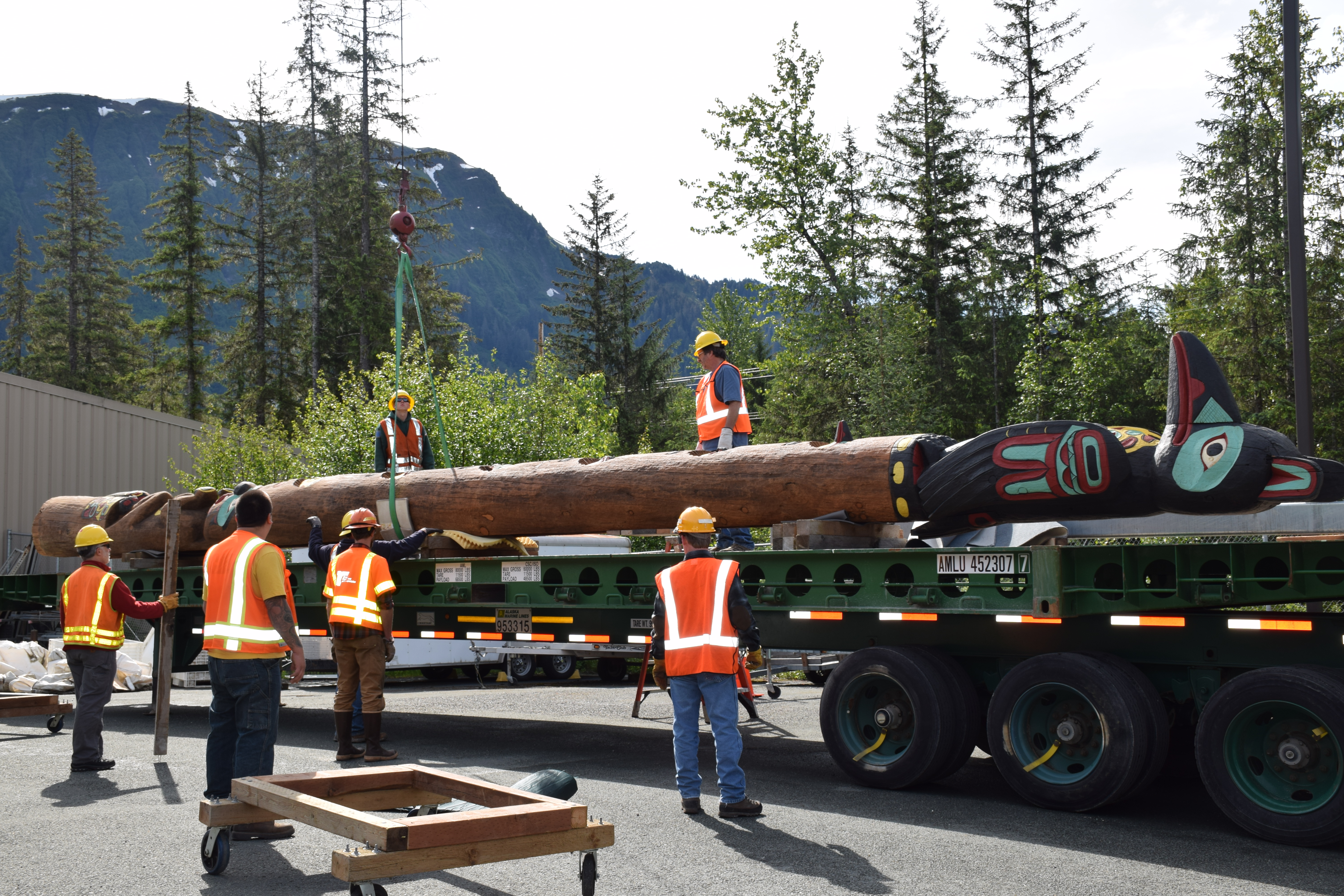
The Yaxté totem pole on a truck at the 2015 re-installation

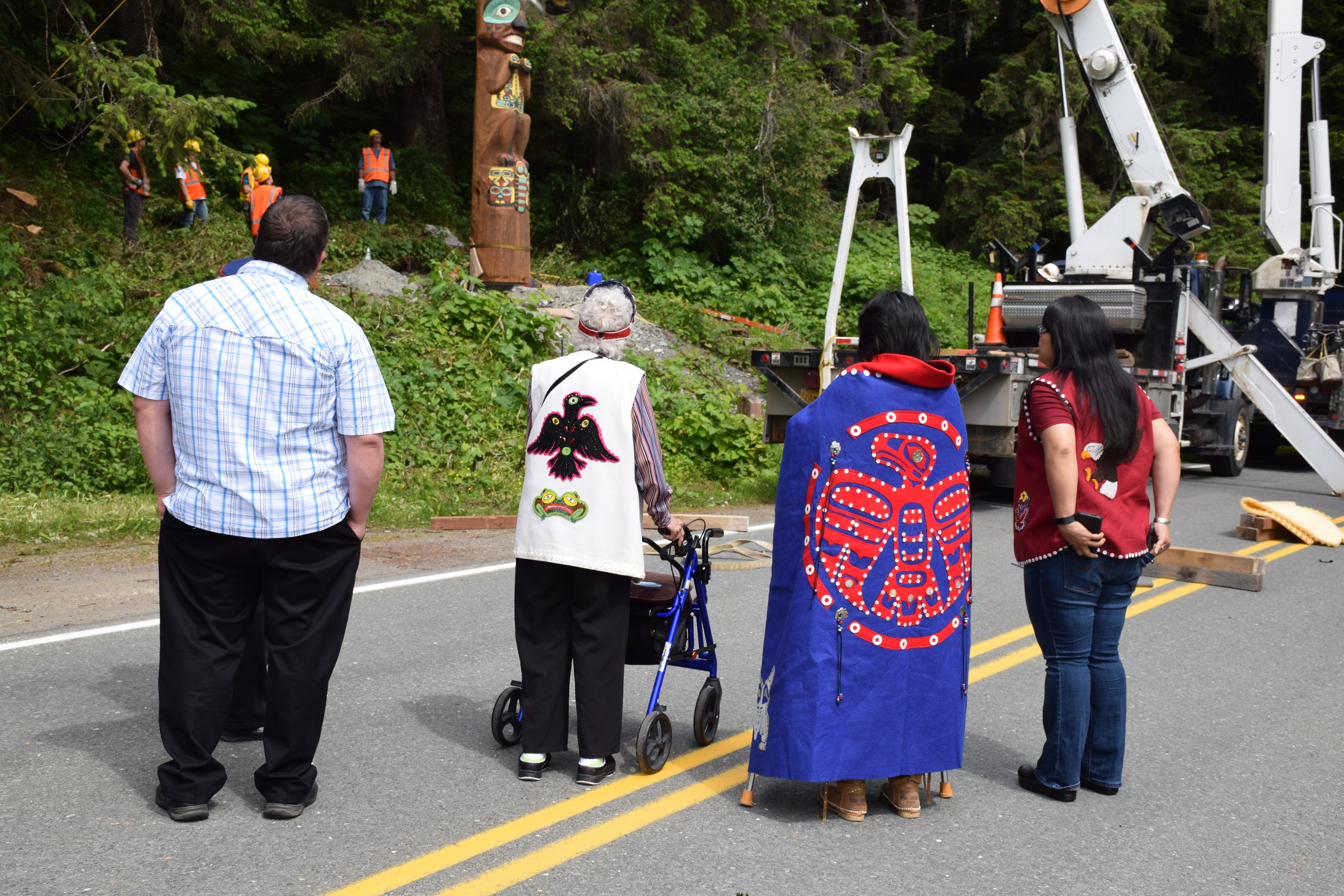
Members of the community watching the installation

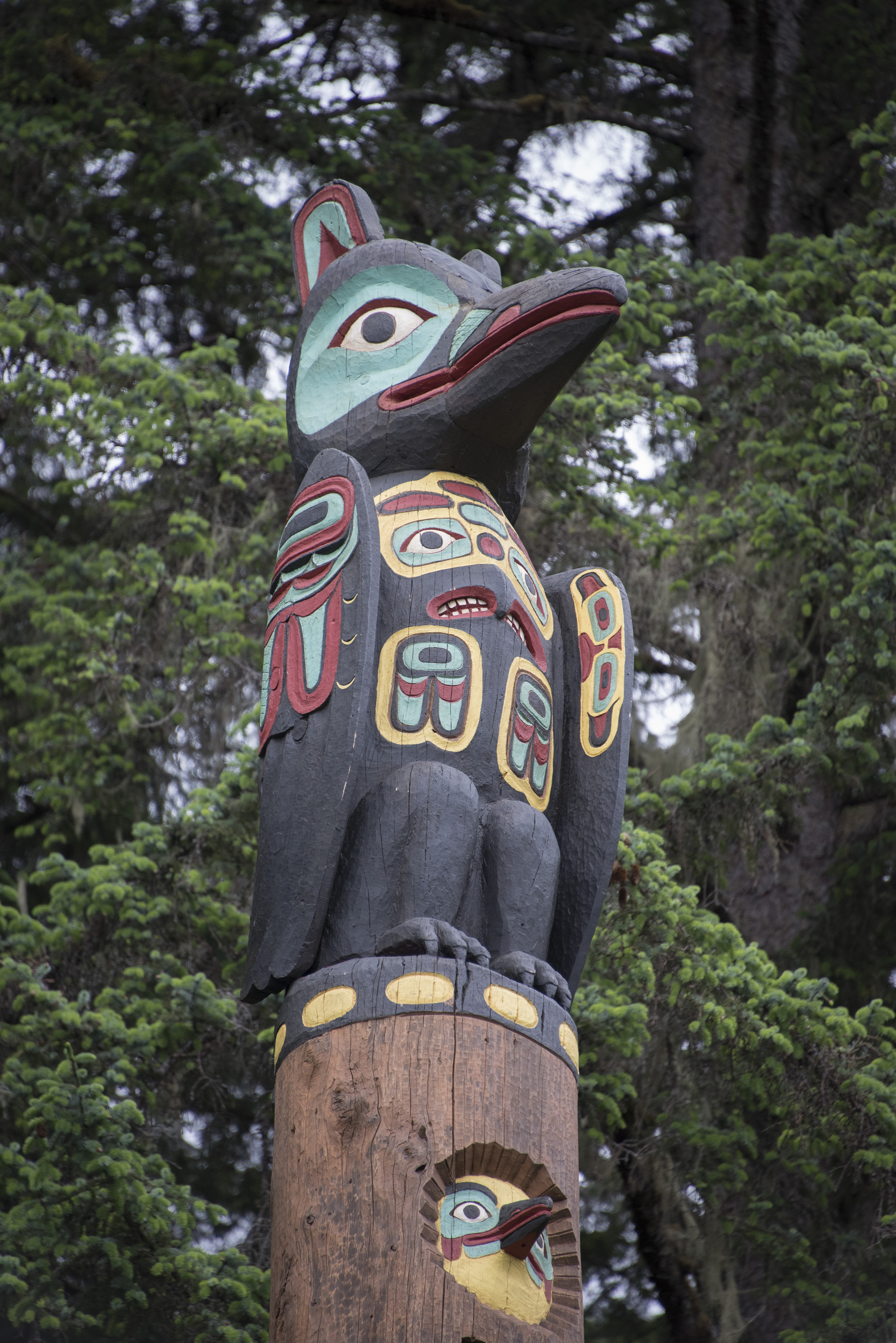
Raven and Magpie

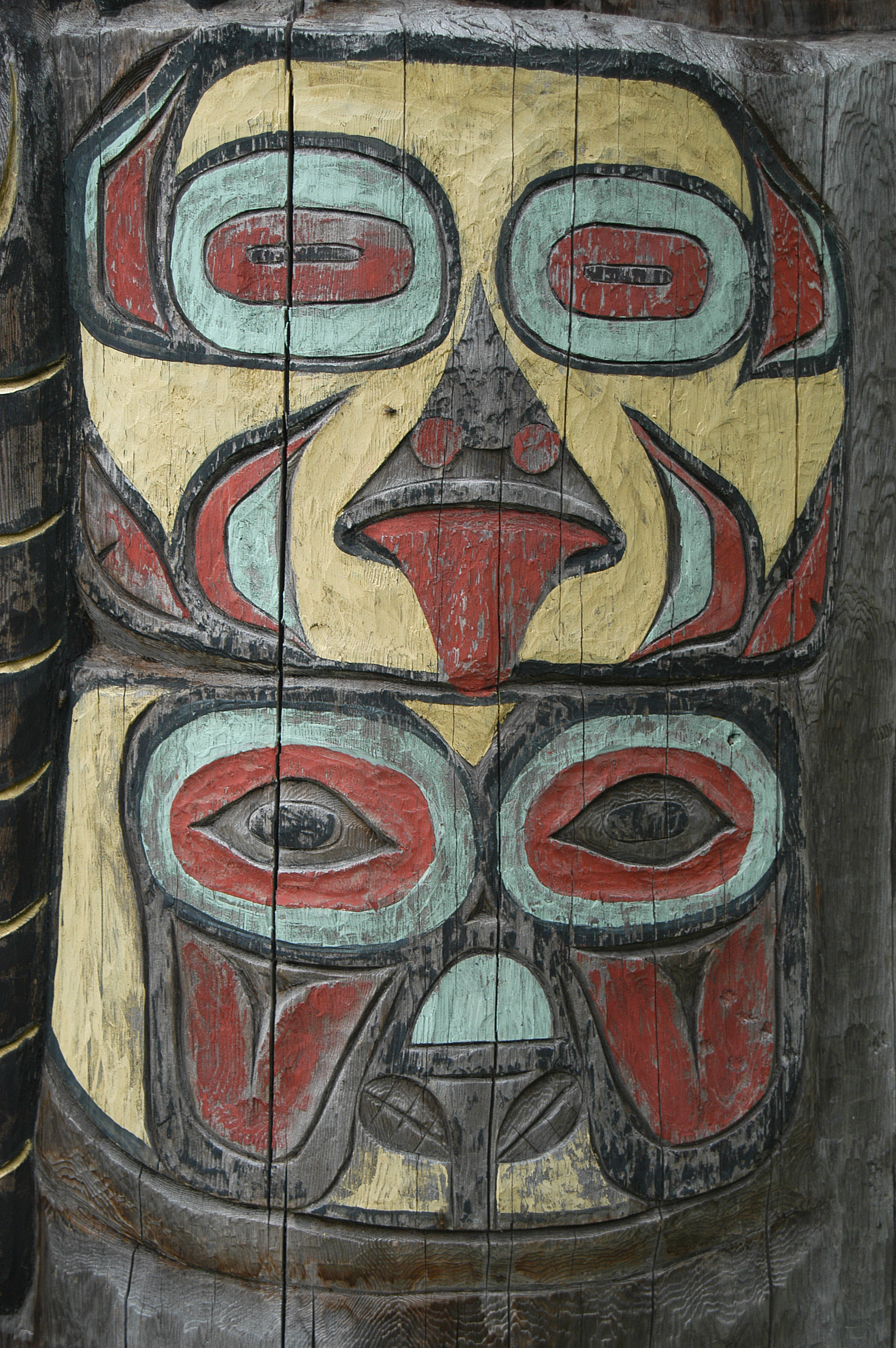
Detail of the totem pole, pre-restoration

== See also ==
- List of totem poles
