= Nick Alan Foote =

American illustrator and artist

Nick Alan (Nick Alan Foote) is a Native American artist and children’s book illustrator. As a member of the Tlingit tribe, he is recognized for his contributions to children's picture books that aim to revitalize the Tlingit language and strengthen cultural heritage.

Foote and his sister, artist Kelsey Mata, were selected as illustrators and character designers for a long-term language revitalization project between the Central Council of the Tlingit and Haida Indian Tribes of Alaska (Tlingit & Haida), the Goldbelt Heritage Foundation, Cedar Group, and several language and culture specialists. The collaboration spans nine children’s books and animated shorts in total, entirely in the Tlingit language. The first book, Kuhaantí (2023), was released in October 2023 in Juneau, Alaska.

His formline artwork, titled "Sacred Embrace," was selected to represent the 2024 Sealaska Celebration event, which centered around the theme "Together We Live in Balance."

== Illustrated works ==
- Raven and the Hidden Halibut, a story adapted from a story by the 2015 Tlingit culture, Language, & Literacy students. Illustrated by Nick Alan Foote. Baby Raven Reads Series. Published by the Sealaska Heritage Institute. 2020.
- Kuhaantí by George Davis, Marge Duston, Ethel Makinen, Herman Davis, and Anne Johnson. Edited and translated by Lance Twitchell. Illustrated by Nick Alan Foote and Kelsey Mata Foote. Published by Tlingit & Haida and the Goldbelt Heritage Foundation. 2023.
- Yéil ḵa Kudatankahídi by George Davis, Marge Dutson, Ruth Demmert, and Marsha Hotch. Edited and translated by Lance Twitchell. Published by Tlingit & Haida and the Goldbelt Heritage Foundation. 2024.
