= Celebration (Alaska festival) =

Alaskan festival

Coordinates: 58°18′00″N 134°24′27″W

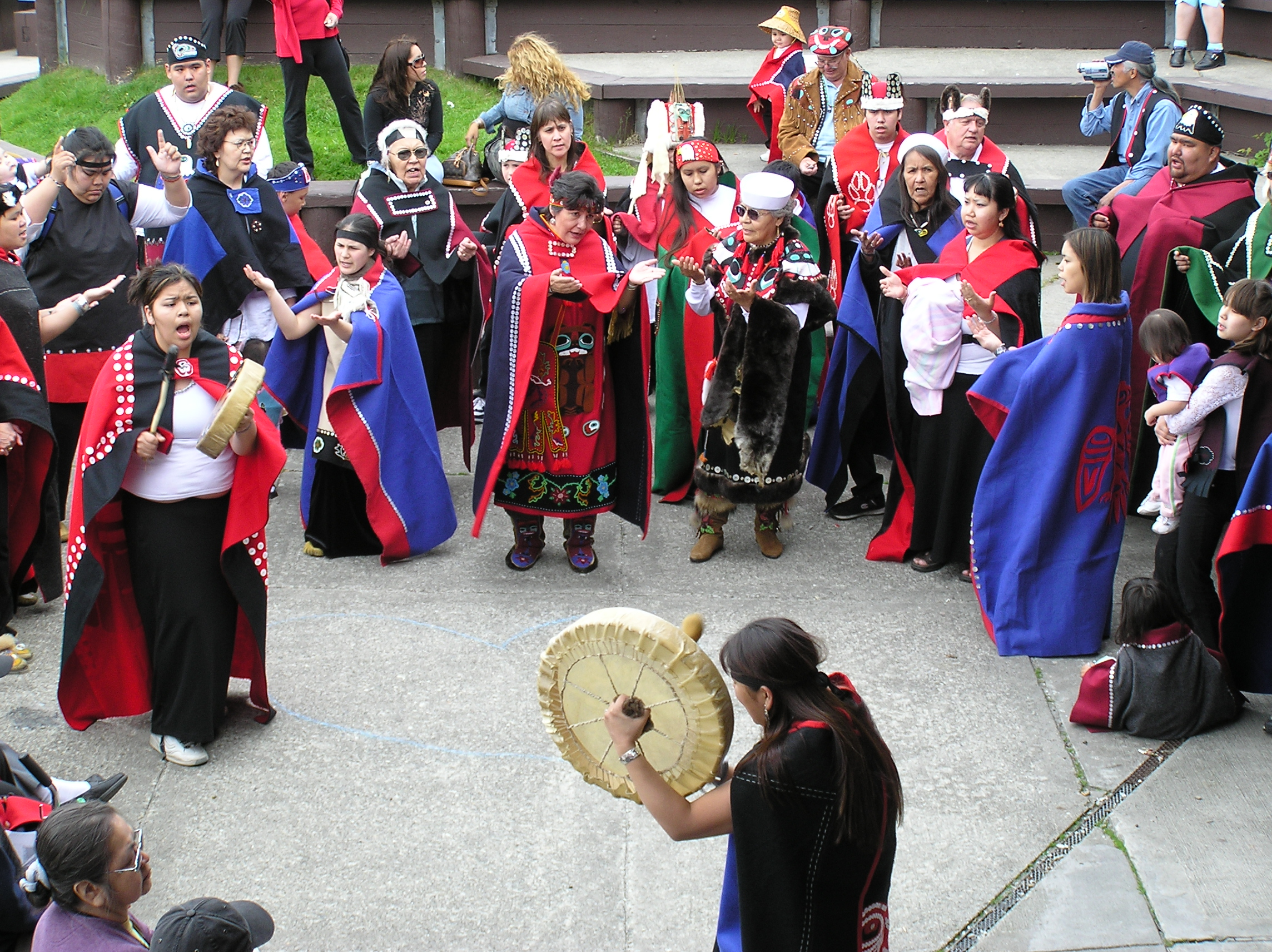
- Celebration's Walk to Centennial Hall, 2006
- Date: First week of June
- Frequency: Once every 2 years
- Location: Juneau, Alaska
- Country: United States of America
- Established: 1982
- Organizer: Sealaska Heritage Institute

Celebration is a biennial Tlingit, Haida and Tsimshian cultural event held during the first week of June in Juneau, Alaska, United States. The most recent one was held June 3 to June 6, 2026.

First held in 1982, Celebration began as a way to pass on cultural knowledge to Native Alaskan children. The first event had 200 participants, and was mainly a dance festival. It is not a potlatch, although it follows the pattern of traditional ceremonies. It has grown to be the largest cultural event in Alaska.

It is sponsored and organized by the Sealaska Heritage Institute, the non-profit cultural arm of Sealaska Corporation of which Alaska Natives are shareholders. The 2012 Celebration was reported to have brought $2 million into the Juneau economy.

== Festival ==
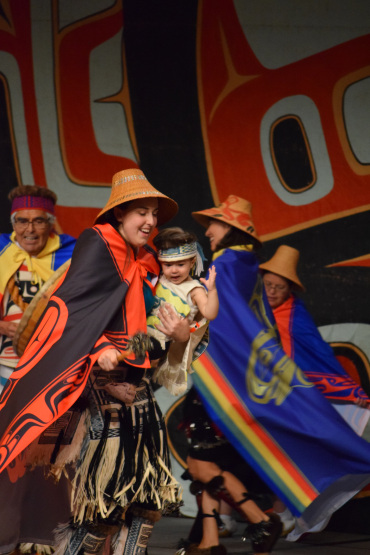
Haida master carver dances with her child at Celebration, circa 2016.

The event consists of a five-day program of activities, starting with the Grand Entrance, a parade of all dance groups through Juneau and into Centennial Hall. Regular activities include workshops on the Tlingit, Haida, and Tsimshian language, Northwest Coast art, and Southeast Alaska Indian cultures and historical events; canoe racing; dance performances; film screenings; poetry gatherings; and a Native fashion show. The Celebration also sponsors traditional food contests, including soapberry and black seaweed, to introduce people to traditional Native foods and highlight the health benefits of these foods.

Celebration was held virtually in 2020 during the Coronavirus pandemic.

The 2022 theme was "Celebrating 10,000 years of cultural survival." This was announced by Rosita Worl, president of Sealaska Heritage Institute. During that year's event, Juneau unveiled the first 360-degree totem pole in Alaska: the 22-foot-tall Sealaska Cultural Values Totem Pole. The structure, carved out of a 600-year-old cedar tree, "represents all three tribes of Southeast Alaska — Lingít, Haida and Tsimshian."

=== Boat Arrival ===
The day before Celebration, over a hundred people arrive by paddling traditional canoes carved by Alaska Natives.

=== Native Artist Market ===
The Native Artist Market supports Native artists and is open to only those artists who are members of federally recognized tribes and meet the requirement of the Indian Arts and Crafts Act of 1990, or Tlingit, Haida, Tsimshian who are Canadian citizens. Artists sell jewelry, masks, drums, dolls, decorative arts, and other handmade arts and crafts.

=== Art competition ===
The Juried Art Show and Competition started in 2002 to showcase and encourage the production of Tlingit, Haida, and Tsimshian art. The art show also encouraged the development of new, contemporary art that was based on traditional forms, but this proved controversial. Contemporary Native artists were concerned that judges were biased in favor of "traditional" art, so contemporary art was recognized as its own category starting with the second show.

=== Baby Regalia Review ===
The Baby Regalia Review started in 2006, as an opportunity to share with children their culture and heritage. During the review, each child is introduced by their European and Native names, tribal and clan membership, and the names of their parents and grandparents.

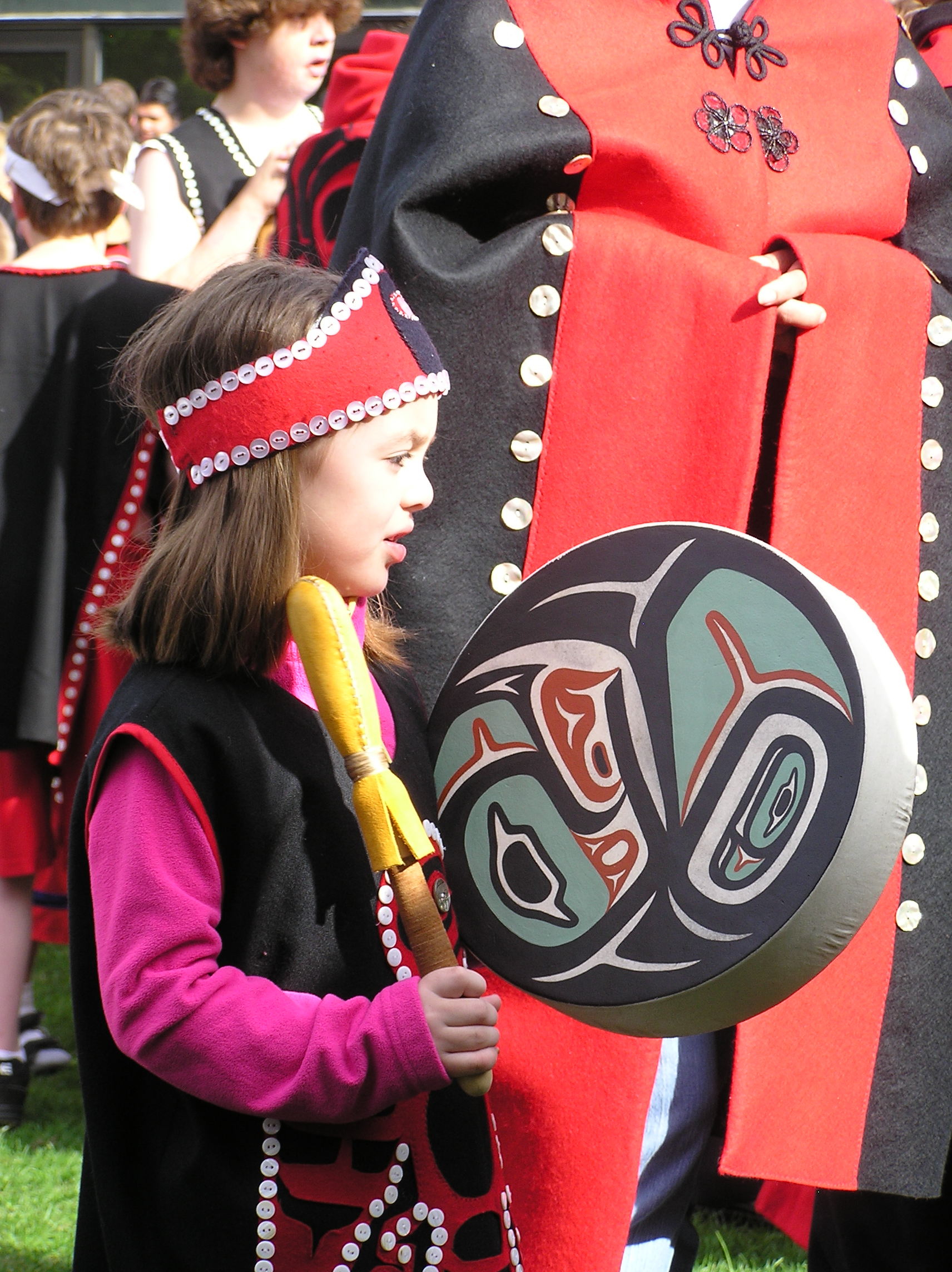
Child, 2006

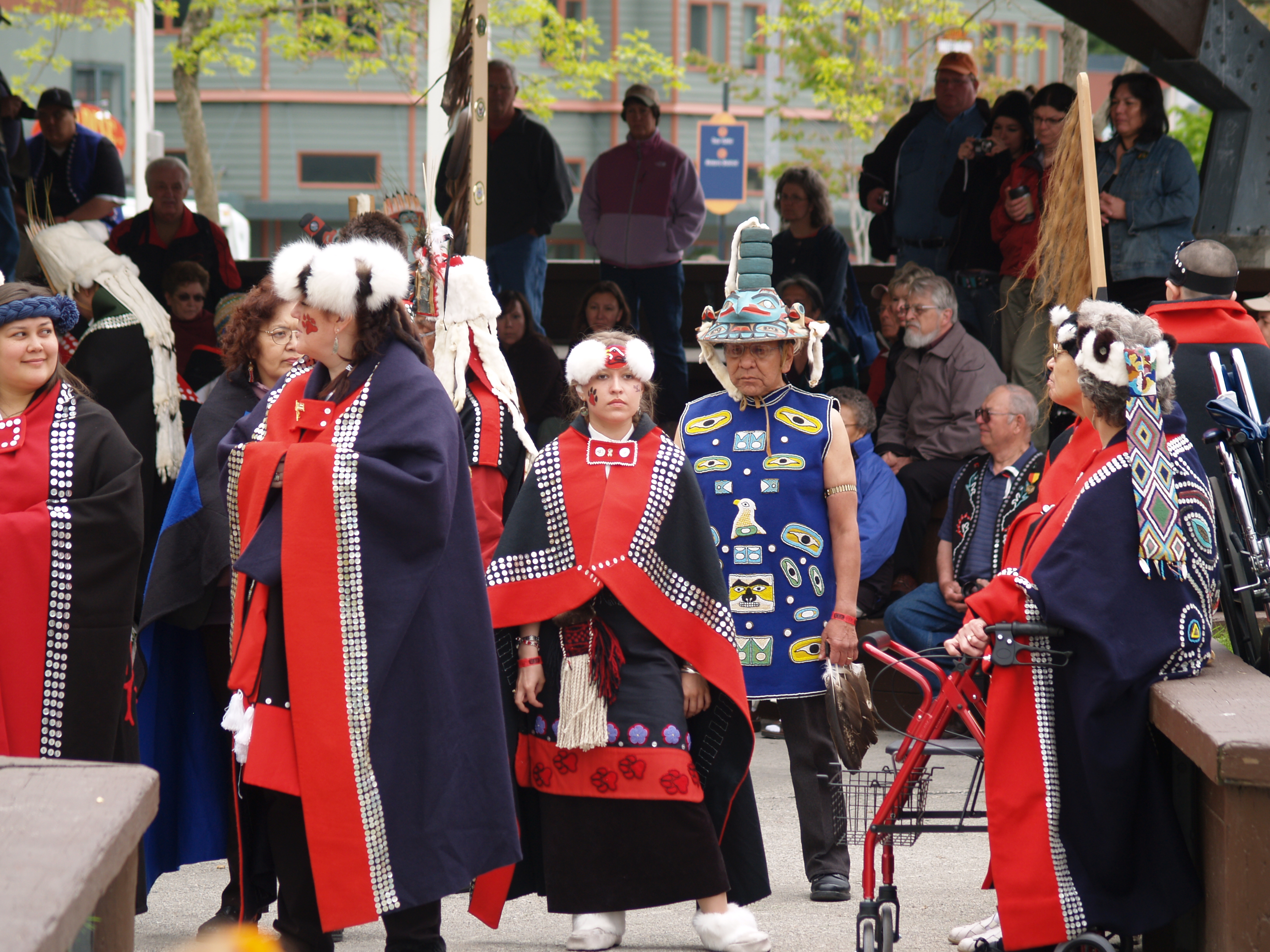
Marine Park Dance, 2008

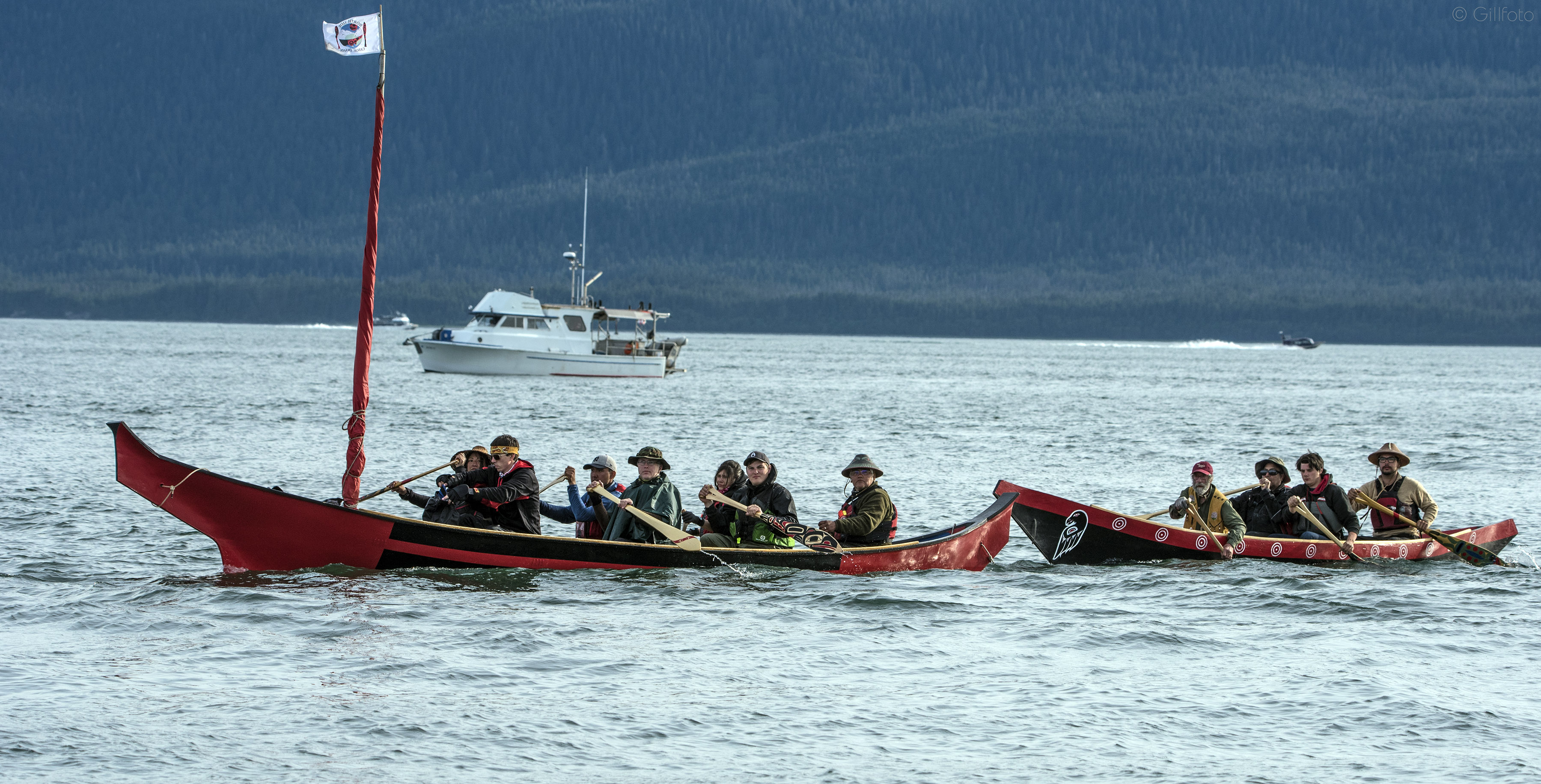
Celebration canoes, 2018

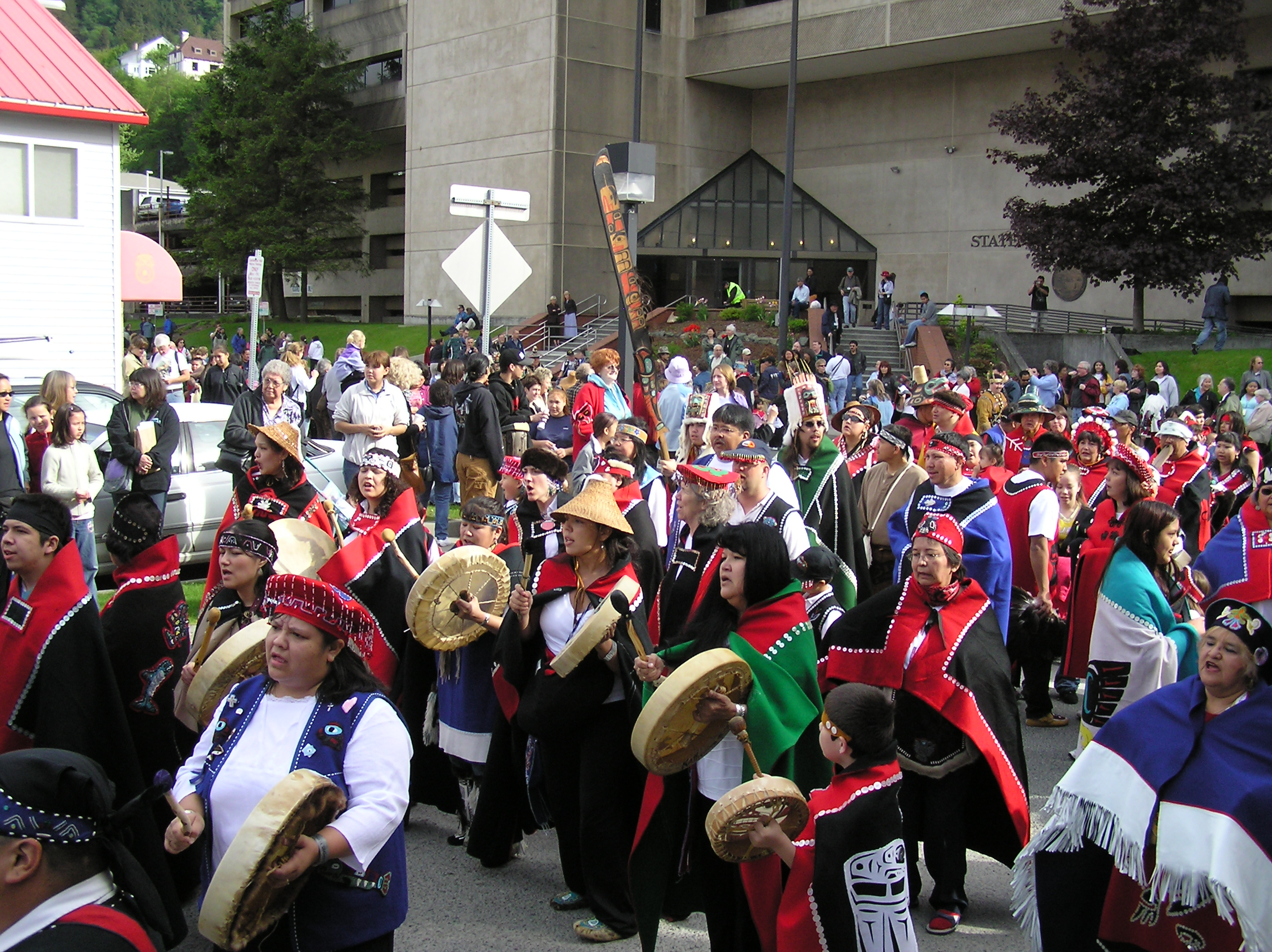
2006 Walk to Centennial Hall

== In popular culture ==
In 2020, Celebration was featured as a plot point in the PBS animated series Molly of Denali, in the episode "Canoe Journey." The Gwichʼin protagonist and her family canoe to Juneau to attend the event, relying on traditional elder advice rather than maps. A local elder describes the route he took in his childhood including secret shortcuts, which aid the protagonists in their own expedition. The episode educates children about traditional Alaskan wayfinding.

== See also ==
- Pow wow
- Alaska Native languages
