= Michaela Goade =

American illustrator

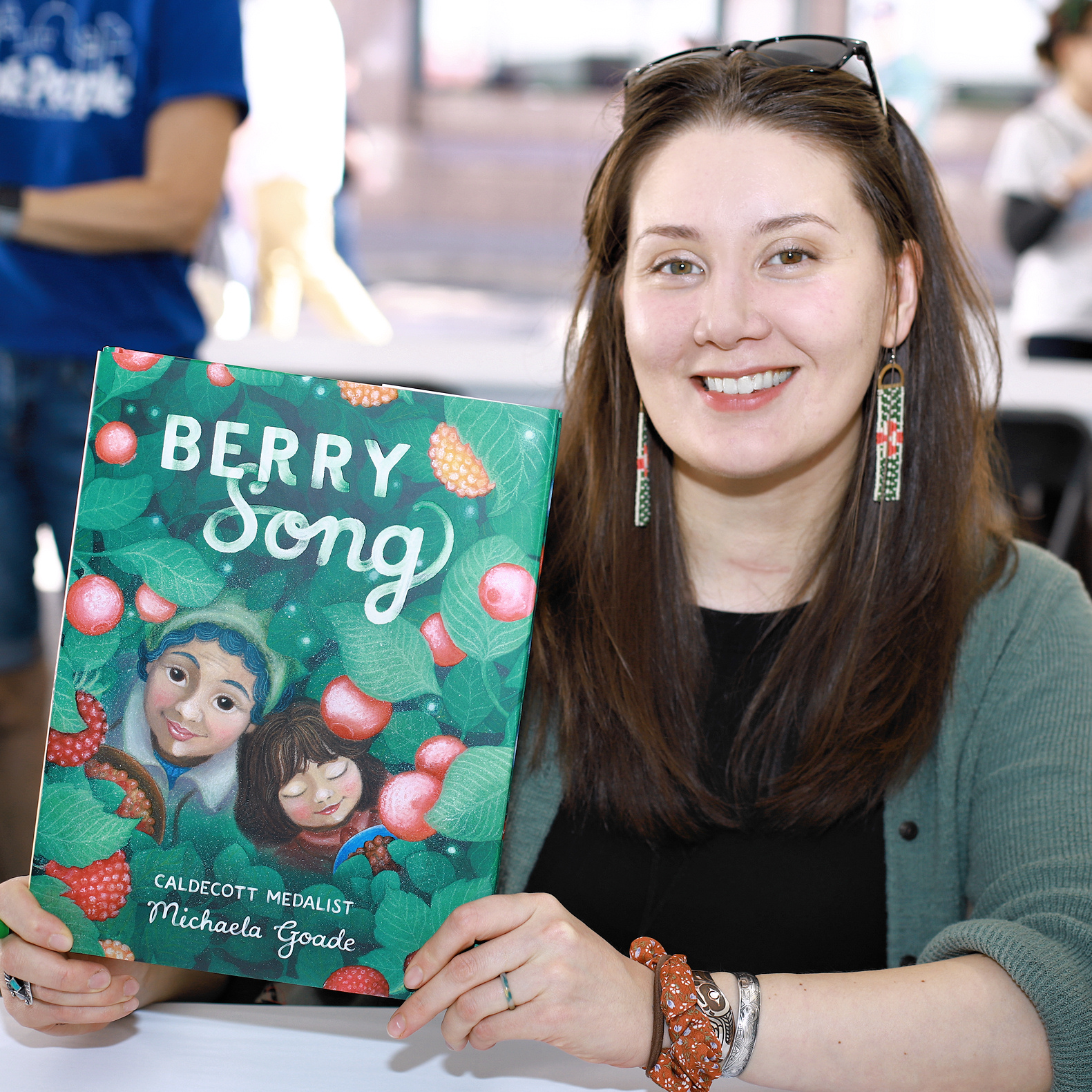
- Goade at the 2022 Texas Book Festival.
- Born: 1989 or 1990 (age 36–37); Juneau, Alaska, U.S.
- Education: Fort Lewis College
- Notable work: We Are Water Protectors; Berry Song
- Awards: Caldecott Medal (2021); Caldecott Honor (2023)
- Website: michaelagoade.com

Michaela Goade (born 1989 or 1990) is a Native American illustrator and author. A member of the Tlingit and Haida tribes, she is known for her work on picture books about Indigenous people. She won the 2021 Caldecott Medal for her illustrations in We Are Water Protectors and is the first Indigenous artist to receive the award. Her book, Berry Song, was a Caldecott Honor book in 2023.

== Early life and education ==
Goade was born in Juneau, Alaska, in 1989 or 1990. She is a member of the Tlingit and Haida tribes of Alaska and the Kiks.ádi clan of Sitka. Goade attended Fort Lewis College in Durango, Colorado, where she received a bachelor's degree in graphic design and marketing in 2014.

== Career ==
After graduating from college, Goade became an art director for Yuit Communications in Anchorage where she worked for two years while also working as a freelance artist. She later quit her job and moved back to Juneau to illustrate picture books for the Sealaska Heritage Institute's Baby Raven Reads series, beginning with Shanyaak'utlaax: Salmon Boy (2017), for which she won the 2018 American Indian Youth Literature Award for Best Picture Book. In 2019, she illustrated the picture book Encounter, written by Brittany Luby. David Treuer of The New York Times wrote that Goade's illustrations for the book were "gorgeous and achingly rendered", and a reviewer for Shelf Awareness praised the varying perspectives of her mixed-media illustrations.

Her next work was We Are Water Protectors, written by Carole Lindstrom and published by Roaring Brook Press in 2020. The book was written in response to the Dakota Access Pipeline protests at Standing Rock, and Goade worked on the watercolor illustrations in 2018 over a period of three to four months. She received the 2021 Caldecott Medal for her illustrations, becoming the first Indigenous artist and first woman of color to win the award. In a review for The Horn Book, Autumn Allen praised the book's illustrations and remarked that "one could read the pictures without the words and take away the same main messages".

She illustrated the Google Doodle for December 30, 2020, which featured the Tlingit civil rights activist Elizabeth Peratrovich. In 2021, she collaborated with the Canadian author Tasha Spillett-Sumner on I Sang You Down from the Stars, a picture book about an Indigenous mother preparing for her new baby.

Goade's book Berry Song was published in 2022 and was selected as a 2023 Caldecott Honor book.

In 2023, Goade collaborated with former U.S. poet laureate Joy Harjo on Remember, a picture book adaptation of Harjo's poem of the same name. Additionally, Goade was the cover artist for the young adult thriller, Warrior Girl Unearthed (2023) by Angeline Boulley.

== Illustrated works ==
- Marks, Johnny; Chester, Hans; Katzeek, David; Dauenhauer, Nora; Dauenhauer, Richard, eds. (2017). Shanyaak'utlaax: Salmon Boy. Baby Raven Reads Series. Sealaska Heritage Institute. ISBN 978-1-946019-02-8.
- Raven and the Tide Lady. Baby Raven Reads Series. Sealaska Heritage Institute. 2018. ISBN 978-1-946019-28-8.
- Luby, Brittany (2019). Encounter. Little, Brown Books for Young Readers. ISBN 978-0-316-44914-4.
- Lindstrom, Carole (2020). We Are Water Protectors. Roaring Brook Press. ISBN 978-1-250-78099-7.
- Spillet-Sumner, Tasha (2021). I Sang You Down from the Stars. Little, Brown Books for Young Readers. ISBN 978-0-316-49316-1.
- Goade, Michaela (2022). Berry Song. Little, Brown Books for Young Readers. ISBN 978-0-316-49417-5
- Harjo, Joy (2023). Remember. Random House Studio. ISBN 978-0593484845.
