= Rosita Worl =

Tlingit American anthropologist (born 1937)

Rosita Kaaháni Worl
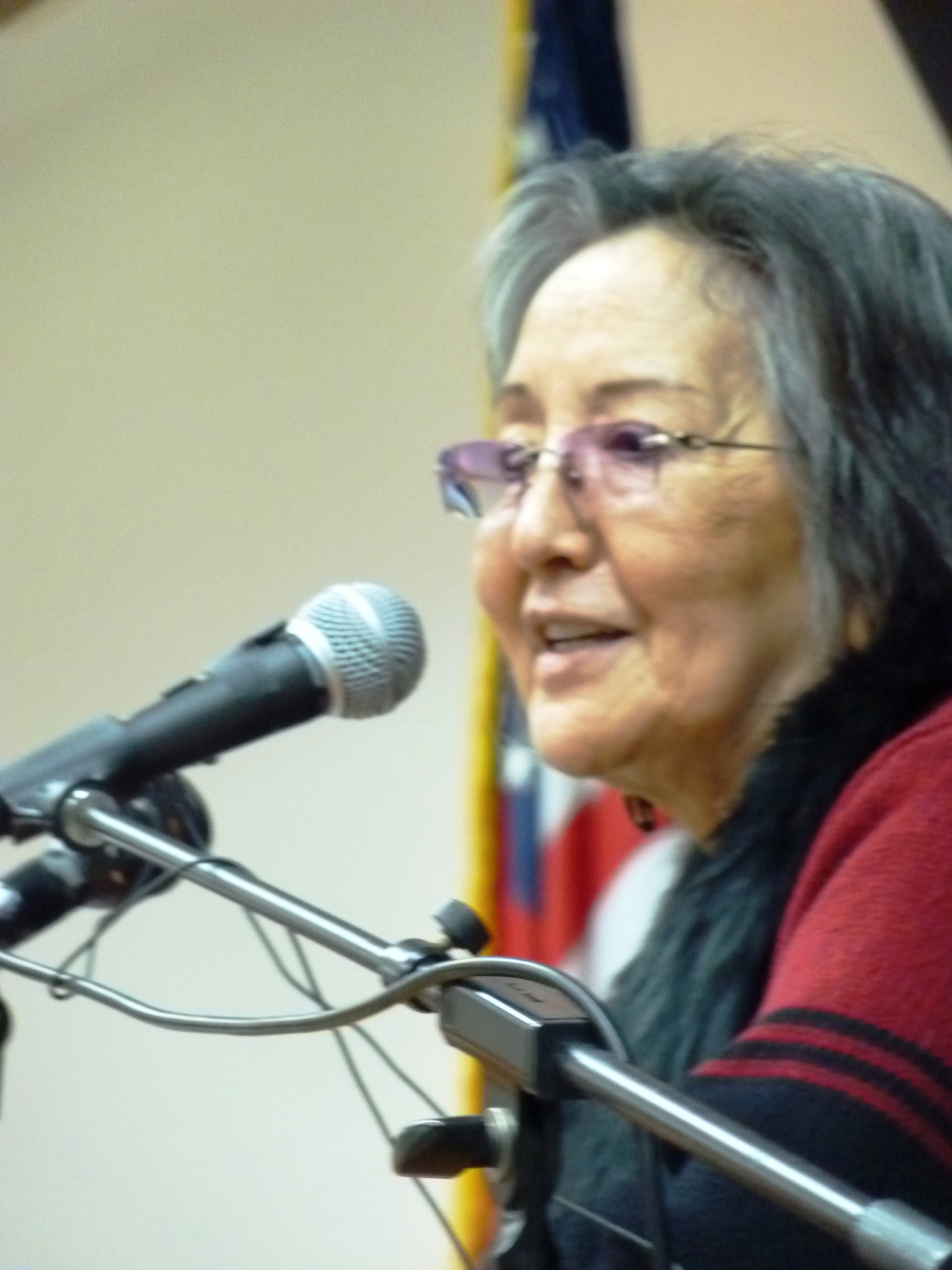
- Sealaska Heritage Institute President and anthropologist Rosita Worl speaks at a Native Issues Forum in Juneau, Alaska, Feb. 22, 2012.
- Born: April 29, 1937 (age 89); Petersburg, Alaska
- Education: Alaska Methodist University Harvard University

Rosita Kaaháni Worl is an Tlingit American anthropologist and Alaska Native cultural, business and political leader. She is president of the Sealaska Heritage Institute, a Juneau-based nonprofit organization that preserves and advances the Tlingit, Haida and Tsimshian Native cultures of Southeast Alaska, and has held that position since 1997. She also served on the board of directors of the Sealaska Native corporation for 30 years, beginning in 1987, including as board vice president. The corporation, with more than 22,000 shareholders, founded the heritage institute and provides substantial funding.

Worl's Tlingit names are Yeidiklasókw and Kaaháni. She is of the Ch’áak’ (Eagle) moiety of the Shangukeidí (Thunderbird) Clan from the Kawdliyaayi Hít (House Lowered from the Sun) in Klukwan. She is a citizen of the Central Council of the Tlingit & Haida Indian Tribes of Alaska.

== Professional life ==
Worl has been a professor of anthropology at University of Alaska campuses in Juneau and Anchorage and has authored papers on subsistence ways of life, Native women's issues, Indian law and policy and Southeast Alaska Native culture and history. She has been associated with the Smithsonian Institution and was among four editors of "Living Our Cultures, Sharing Our Heritage: The First Peoples of Alaska," published in 2010 by Smithsonian Books. It features more than 200 objects representing the artistry and design traditions of 20 Alaska Native peoples.

She also served on the Native American Graves Protection and Repatriation Act (NAGPRA) National Review Committee from 2000 to 2013, including as its chairperson. The committee monitors the process of repatriation, where Native remains and artifacts in museums are returned to their original owners. It facilitates the resolution of related disputes between museums and tribes.

A related paper about NAGPRA, "Integrating Science & Stories: Tlingit Ancient History," was presented to the Society for Applied Anthropology in 2005. It focused on coastal migration, genetic studies, the discovery of 10,000-year-old remains of an early indigenous man in Southeast Alaska and how tribal leaders and scientists researched his origins together.

Earlier in her career, Worl conducted field work in the Arctic, studying socio-cultural impacts on the Inupiat from offshore oil development. She also studied the aboriginal whaling complex and served as a scientific advisor to the U.S. Department of State for the International Whaling Commission and the Alaska Eskimo Whaling Commission.

In 1982, she and her children founded Alaska Native News, a monthly statewide magazine, which contained in-depth feature articles on Alaska Native corporations, art, culture, transportation, energy and other topics. It operated through 1985.

Worl served as an adviser on Alaska Native and Rural Affairs to Alaska Gov. Steve Cowper in the mid-1980s, where she formulated the first State of Alaska Policy on Alaska Natives. In that role, she analyzed federal legislation revising parts of the Alaska Native Claims Settlement Act to reduce the chance that Native corporations created by the act could be taken over by non-Native interests. Worl made the case that the revisions did not fully protect those corporations.

She also served as a member of President Bill Clinton's Northwest Sustainability Commission. She has served on numerous boards and committees, including the Alaska Federation of Natives, the Indigenous Languages Institute, the National Science Foundation Polar Programs Committee, the Alaska Eskimo Whaling Commission Scientific Committee and the National Museum of the American Indian.

Worl chaired the subsistence committee of the Alaska Federation of Natives and addressed federal officials in that role. In 2013, she addressed the Energy and Resources Committee of the U.S. Senate, explaining the importance of traditional hunting, fishing and other food-gathering to Alaska Natives. She estimated that at that time, the annual average per-person harvest was 544 pounds, making up about half of their caloric intake. Worl noted that federal regulation of such harvests interfered with Alaska Natives’ ability to feed themselves and their families.

In recent years, Worl has taken the Sealaska Heritage Institute in new directions. It dedicated its new Juneau headquarters, in the Walter Soboleff Building, in 2015. The building includes contemporary and traditional Native art, a museum, a performance and lecture area and classrooms.

The institute also broke ground in 2020 for a new cultural arts complex across the street from the Soboleff Building. The 6,000-square-foot campus will be home to classes, live demonstrations of traditional Southeast Alaska Native arts and monumental works of Tlingit, Haida and Tsimshian art. College-level courses will be offered in conjunction with the University of Alaska Southeast and the Institute of American Indian Arts.

== Early life ==
Worl was born in a cabin on a beach near Petersburg, Alaska, in 1938. She was raised by her grandmother, aunt and mother. When she was 6, she was kidnapped from her home and taken to Haines House, a Presbyterian mission in Haines, where she and other Alaska Native children were taught English and the Christian religion.

Because the young girl was forced to leave her home, her grandparents, John and Jennie Thlunaut, “rented” her from the missionaries in order to spend time with her. Her aunt, Agnes Bellinger, went to work at Haines House to watch over her. She attended for three years before her mother, Bessie Quinto, was able to take her home to live with her 12 brothers and sisters.

Quinto taught her daughter that she had an obligation to serve the Native community, through the Alaska Native Sisterhood and other organizations. At age 10, Worl traveled with her mother as she organized workers at salmon canneries throughout Southeast Alaska. Worl was required to take meeting minutes. As a teenager, she fished commercially with an uncle, something girls of that age were not allowed to do.

== Education ==
Worl attended high school in Petersburg. After graduation, she ran a program that recruited Alaska Natives for higher education. She said she recruited herself and started college by taking one class at a time.

She studied at Alaska Methodist University in Anchorage in the 1970s with noted language and folklore professor Richard Dauenhauer and others, earning a bachelor's degree. She went on to earn a master's degree and a Ph.D. in anthropology from Harvard University. She was awarded an honorary Doctor of Sciences degree from the University of Alaska Anchorage in 2012.

== Honors and awards ==
Worl's work has been recognized with numerous honors, including a Ford Foundation Fellowship (1972-1977), International Women's Year Conference (1977), the Gloria Steinem Award for Empowerment (1989), Women of Hope (1997), Outstanding Contribution, Alaska Native Heritage Center (2000), Human Rights Award, Cultural Survival (2002), Women of Courage Award NWPC (2003), Native People Award Enhancing the Native Alaskan Community, Wells Fargo (2004), National Museum of the American Indian Smithsonian Institution Honor (2006), University of Alaska Southeast Commencement Speaker (2006), Distinguished Service to the Humanities Award (2008) Governor's Award for the Arts & Humanities, Solon T. Kimball Award for Public and Applied Anthropology, American Anthropological Association (2008), Lifetime Achievement Award, Central Council of the Tlingit and Haida Indian Tribes of Alaska (2011) and the Alaska Federation of Natives Citizen of the Year Award (2011).

== Family ==
Worl has three children, Celeste, Rod, and Ricardo Worl, and six grandchildren, Rico, Crystal, Kyle, Miranda, Ricky, and Sage.
