= We Are Water Protectors =

2020 picture book by Carole Lindstrom

- Author: Carole Lindstrom
- Illustrator: Michaela Goade
- Publisher: Roaring Brook Press
- Publication date: March 17, 2020
- Pages: 40
- ISBN: 978-1-250-78099-7

We Are Water Protectors is a 2020 picture book written by Carole Lindstrom and illustrated by Michaela Goade. Written in response to the Dakota Access Pipeline protests, the book tells the story of an Ojibwe girl who fights against an oil pipeline in an effort to protect the water supply of her community. It was published by Roaring Brook Press on March 17, 2020. The book was well received. Critics praised its message of environmental justice, its depiction of diversity, and the watercolor illustrations, for which Goade won the 2021 Caldecott Medal, becoming the first Indigenous recipient of the award. The book also received the 2021 Jane Addams Children's Book Award winner in the Books for Younger Children category.

== Synopsis ==
The narrator, an Ojibwe girl, recalls her grandmother teaching her about the sanctity of water. Their people foretell a black snake that will one day destroy their land and poison their water. The girl says that the black snake has already arrived in the form of an oil pipeline. She resolves to rally her people against it and protect their water supply for the sake of animals, plants, the environment, and the Earth. Reflecting on her grandmother's words, the girl declares that "we are water protectors" who will give the black snake the fight of its life.

== Background and publication ==
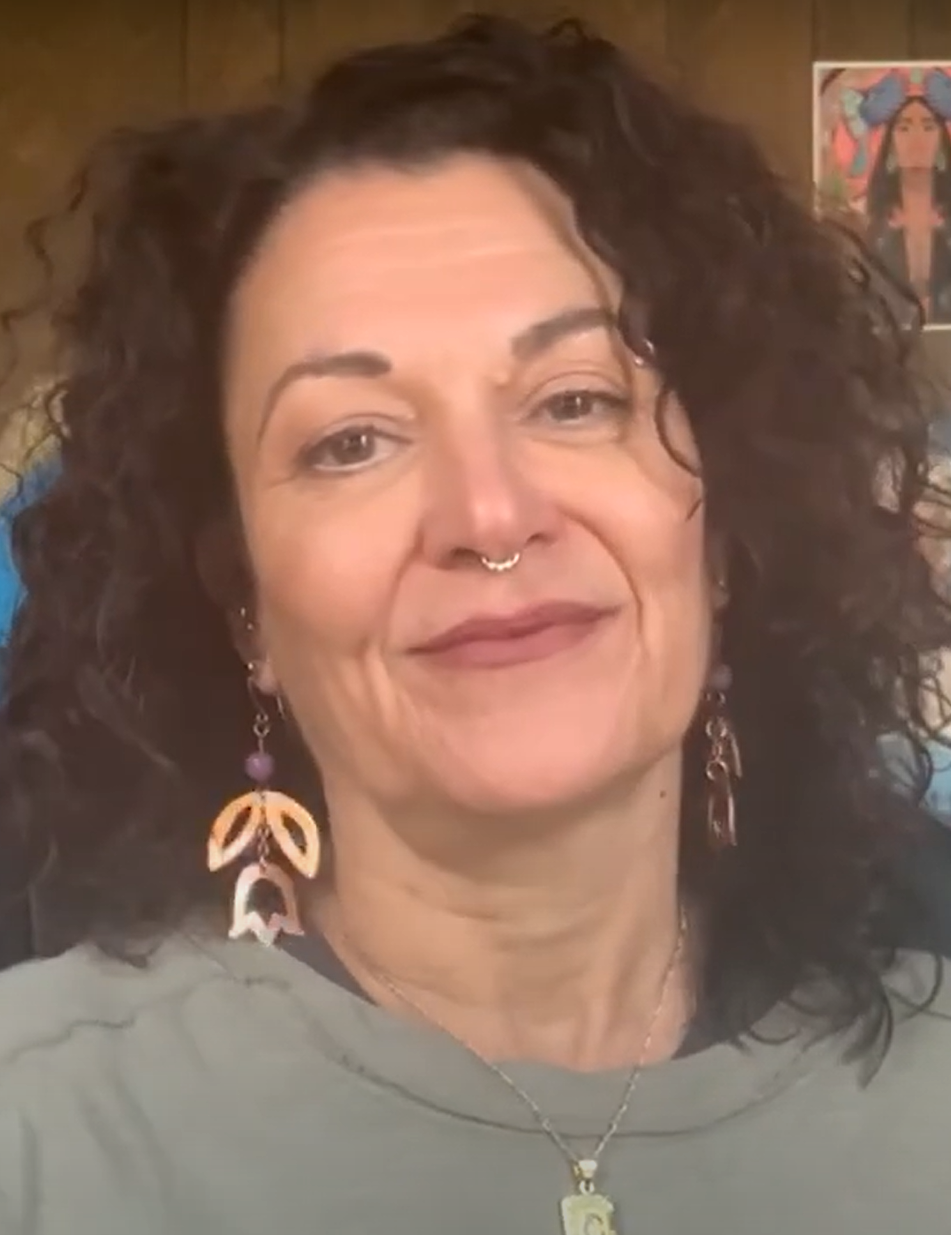
Lindstrom in 2022

We Are Water Protectors was written by Carole Lindstrom, who is Ojibwe, and illustrated by Michaela Goade, who is a member of the Tlingit and Haida tribes. Lindstrom decided to write the book after learning about the Dakota Access Pipeline protests at the Standing Rock Reservation in 2016. She was unable to join the protests in person due to family commitments and wrote the book to raise awareness of the protests. She wrote the manuscript in 2018 and Goade agreed to illustrate it that year after she received a copy from her agent. The illustrations were painted in watercolor over a period of three to four months. The young protagonist was based on similarly young activists at Standing Rock, and her representation as a young girl was derived from the connection between women and water in Lindstrom's and Goade's cultures.

The 40-page book was published by Roaring Brook Press on March 17, 2020. In addition to the story, the book includes notes about the protests at Standing Rock and a glossary. The final page contains a pledge that the reader can sign to become an "Earth Steward and Water Protector". An animated adaptation, narrated by Lindstrom and with Goade's artwork animated by the American filmmaker Galen Fott, was released by Weston Woods Studios in June 2021.

== Writing and illustrations ==
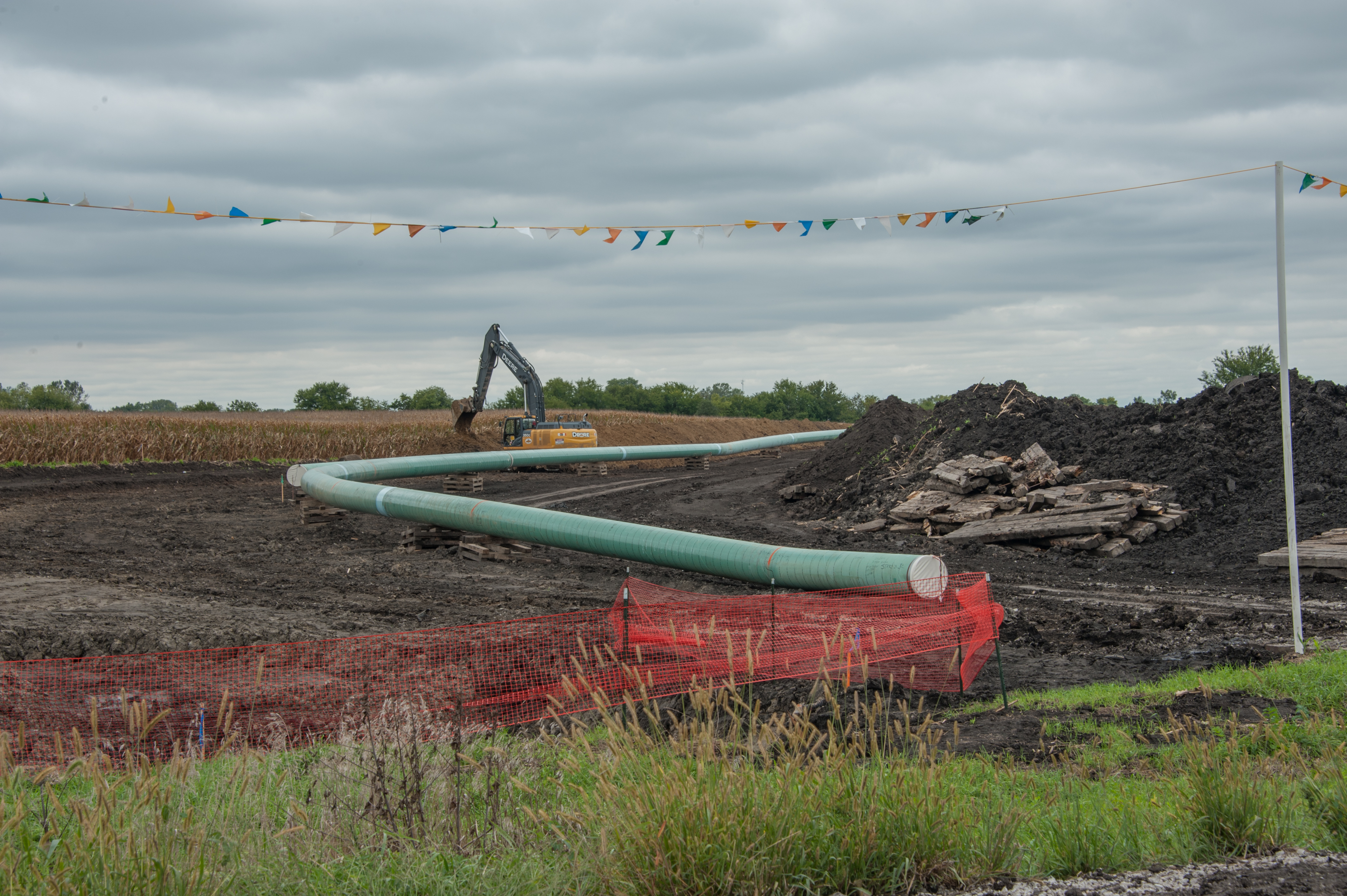
Installation of the Dakota Access Pipeline in 2016

The book was originally envisioned as a novel with a more substantial plot, but eventually became a shorter picture book because Lindstrom felt that the story "needed to be told quickly, faster". Reviewers described the text as having a lyrical or poetic quality. Writing for The Horn Book, Autumn Allen compared the text to a chanted poem, while Ronny Khuri, an editor for Booklist, compared the flow of Lindstrom's words to the rhythm of the river depicted in the book. The lines "We stand / With our songs / And our drums. / We are still here." are repeated throughout the book as a representation of the girl's determination to fight against the pipeline. In an interview, Lindstrom said that she has "always been a sparse writer", and that she felt that using fewer words allowed both the illustrator (Goade) and the reader to use their imaginations in visualizing the story.

In Goade's watercolor illustrations, the people are shown with different skin tones, ages, genders, and clothing. According to Goade, the story "didn't need to be specific to any one nation, and with over 500 Indigenous Nations represented at Standing Rock," she wanted to depict a diverse set of people. Her depiction of the black snake is designed to resemble an oil pipeline, and its fearsome appearance conveys the threat that it poses. Goade said that among the most challenging illustrations in the book was one showing the pipeline's effect on animals such as birds and fish, as they are turned into partial skeletons. The snake is set against red backgrounds that are a harsh contrast to the watery landscapes, which are mostly in shades of blue, purple, and aquamarine. The illustrations also contain symbols and floral designs from the Ojibwe tribe, and turtles throughout the book allude to Turtle Island, a name for Earth or North America used by many Indigenous peoples.

== Reception ==
We Are Water Protectors received starred reviews (reviews marked with a star to denote books of distinction or particularly high quality) from Booklist, BookPage, Kirkus Reviews, Publishers Weekly, and the School Library Journal. Goade received the 2021 Caldecott Medal for her illustrations, becoming the first Indigenous artist to win the award. In her acceptance speech, Goade stated that she hoped "that Indigenous children leave the story feeling seen and celebrated, because they are so often told the opposite in our world". The book was the 2021 Jane Addams Children's Book Award winner in the Books for Younger Children category. It was also a finalist for the 2020 Kirkus Prize in the Young Readers' Literature category, a #1 New York Times bestseller in the Children's Picture Books list, and received a 2021 Golden Kite Honor in the Picture Book Text category.

Critics particularly praised the book's message of environmental justice and Goade's watercolor illustrations. In his review for Booklist, Khuri described it as "a beautiful tribute and powerful manifesto", applauding the paintings of water, landscapes, and the black snake. A reviewer for Kirkus Reviews felt that the fearsome depiction of the black snake was counterbalanced by the book's call to action, and praised the diversity of the girl's community and the symbolism of elements drawn from Lindstrom's and Goade's lineages. Allen's review for The Horn Book stated that "one could read the pictures without the words and take away the same main messages". She commented that the combination of the text and the illustrations enables the book to "influence minds and cultures".

Like Allen, many reviewers applauded the book's messages to children about the importance of environmental protection. Reviewing for Shelf Awareness, Terry Hong wrote that the environmental pledge on the last page "urges early awareness" and that the book would be inspirational to even very young children. The School Library Journal found it to be "an accessible introduction to environmental issues". The audiobook version and animated adaptation were also well received; Brian Wilson, a reviewer for Booklist, praised the use of sound effects such as waves crashing and the hissing of the snake.

Awards
| Preceded by The Undefeated | Caldecott Medal recipient 2021 | Succeeded by Watercress |
