= Lance Twitchell =

American Tlingit scholar and writer

X̱ʼunei Lance Twitchell (born 1975) is an American Tlingit scholar, poet, and language revitalization advocate. He works as professor of Alaska Native Languages at the University of Alaska Southeast.

== Education and career ==
Twitchwell earned a Ph.D. in Hawaiian and indigenous language and culture revitalization from the Ka Haka ʻUla O Keʻelikōlani College of Hawaiian Language at the University of Hawaii at Hilo, an M.F.A. in creative writing from the University of Alaska Fairbanks, and a B.A. in English with a minor in American Indian studies from the University of Minnesota Twin Cities. He was granted tenure in the Department of Humanities, School of Arts & Sciences at the University of Alaska Southeast in 2018.

Twitchwell serves on the Alaska Native Language Preservation & Advisory Council, appointed by the governor. He also teaches Tlingit language courses at UAS, which began offering them for free in 2022.

Twitchwell wrote three episodes of the PBS cartoon Molly of Denali, which aired in 2021 and 2022.

== Personal life ==
Twitchell is a citizen of the Central Council of the Tlingit & Haida Indian Tribes of Alaska and is of Tlingit, Haida, Yup'ik, and Sámi descent. He is one of fewer than 400 proficient speakers of the Tlingit (Língit) language in the United States.

== Awards and work ==
=== Awards ===
- Top Forty Under 40 award, Alaska Journal of Commerce (2013)
- Judson L. Brown Leadership Award from Sealaska Heritage Institute (2016)
- Contributions to Literacy in Alaska (CLIA) Awards, Alaska Center for the Book (2017)
- First Alaskan Institute Young Native Leader Award (2020)
- Emmy award for “Molly of Denali” episode in the category of Outstanding Writing for a Preschool Animated Program (2025)

=== Poems ===
- "Nanook Sweats," "Release, Definition: Trickster," "Ode to Tlingit, Yellow Hair Takes the Fat and We Lament His Seedy Departure," and "Dark Skin and Betraying Uncle," published in Yellow Medicine Review (Spring, 2009)
- "Shaawatkʼeʼs Birth", co-author, filmed by Alaska Quarterly Review (2016)

=== Books ===
- Haa Wsineix̲ Haa Yoo X̲'atángi (Our language Saved Us): A Guidebook for Learning the Tlingit Language
- Beginning Tlingit Workbook (2017)
- Tlingit Reference Guide: Verbs, Grammar, Location & Direction, Concepts, Juneau, AK: Goldbelt Heritage Foundation, 2020

=== Chapters ===
- Tlingit use of marine space: putting up fish by Caskey Russell and X̱'unei Lance Twitchell
