= Sealaska Corporation =

Alaska Native corporation

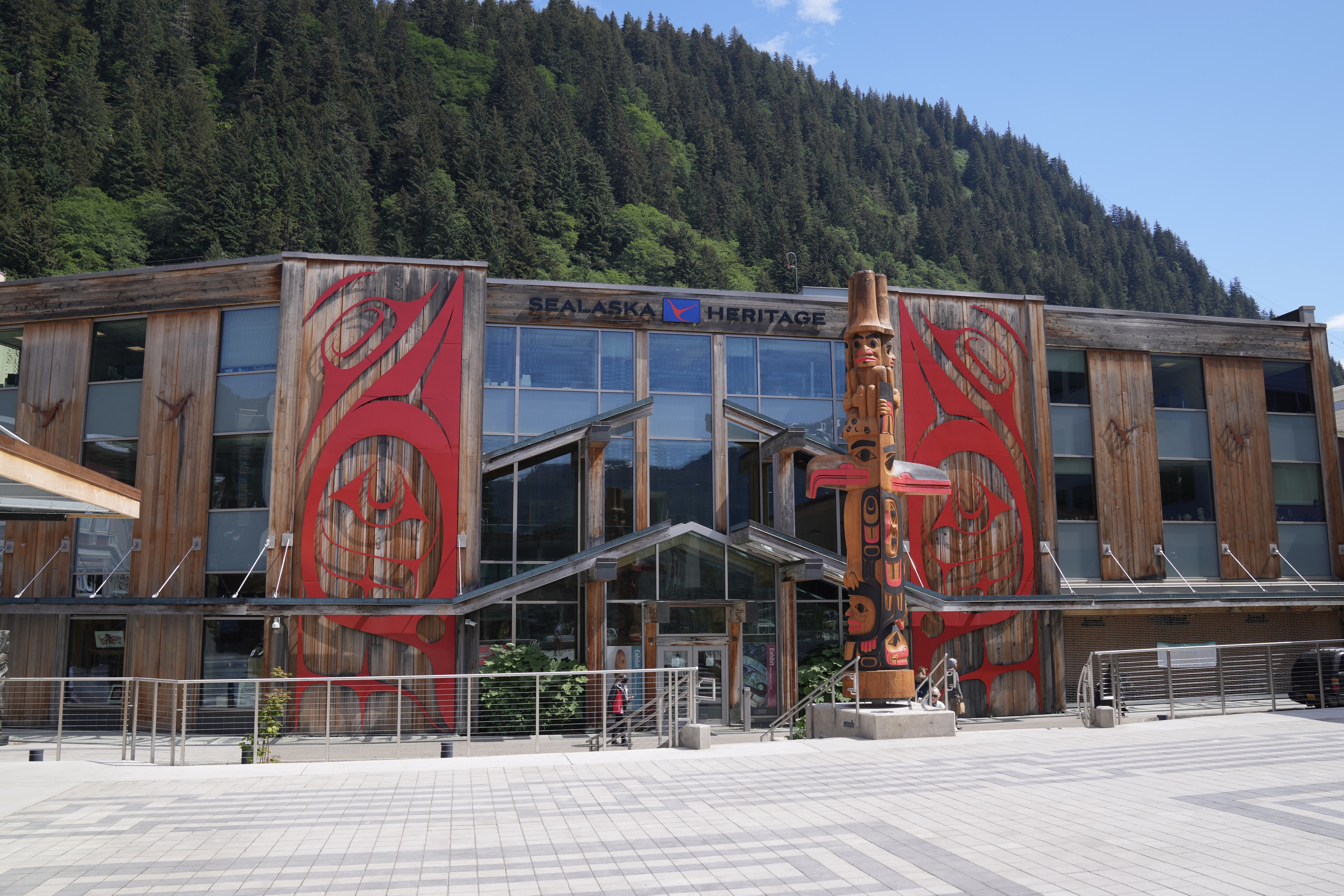
Sealaska Heritage Institute, Juneau, Alaska; on the right is the 2022 Sealaska Cultural Values Totem Pole

Sealaska Corporation is one of thirteen Alaska Native Regional Corporations created under the Alaska Native Claims Settlement Act of 1971 (ANCSA) in settlement of aboriginal land claims. Headquartered in Juneau, Alaska, Sealaska is a for-profit corporation with more than 23,000 Alaska Native shareholders primarily of Tlingit, Haida, and Tsimshian descent.

Sealaska was incorporated in Alaska on June 16, 1972. In 1981, Sealaska Corporation sponsored the creation of the non-profit Sealaska Heritage Foundation, now the Sealaska Heritage Institute, which manages its cultural and educational programs.

Sealaska’s primary economic drivers are natural resources, land management, environmental services and seafood.

== Shareholders ==
At incorporation, Sealaska enrolled 15,782 Alaska Natives, each of whom received 100 shares of Sealaska stock. Approximately 1,800 additional Alaska Natives have since acquired Sealaska stock through inheritance of shares or gifting. As an ANCSA corporation, Sealaska has no publicly traded stock, and its shares cannot legally be sold.

Sealaska shareholders voted on June 23, 2007, to enroll qualified descendants of original shareholders by issuing them 100 shares of life estate stock in Sealaska. However, unlike shares of original shareholders, the new shares would expire on the descendant's death and could not be willed or gifted. To be eligible, descendants must be children or grandchildren of original Sealaska shareholders, must be of at least one-quarter Alaska Native descent, and must not be a member of any other regional corporation unless through inheritance or gift. Sealaska is one of the few ANCSA Regional Corporations to elect to enroll descendants and allot them shares.

Sealaska has established a Permanent Fund, comprising investments in stocks, bonds, real estate, and private equity funds, as a source of shareholder dividends.

Sealaska reinvests a significant portion of its earnings back into its community-oriented subsidiaries and offers opportunities for young shareholders. Program offerings include full- and part-time student scholarships, wellness and culture camps, summer internships, and the Board Youth Advisor position.

== Lands ==
From ANCSA section 14, Sealaska owns approximately 290,000 acres (1,170 km^{2}) of surface estate and 560,000 acres (2,270 km^{2}) of subsurface estate in Southeast Alaska. Despite having the most shareholders of any regional corporation, it received the least amount of land in the 44 million-acre settlement. Sealaska received a second conveyance of land, approximately 65,000 acres, due to advocacy in Congress. Sealaska's current land holdings in Southeast Alaska are roughly 1.6 percent of the traditional homelands that the Tlingit, Haida, and Tsimshian people inhabited for over 10,000 years. Five traditional communities were left out of the original ANCSA conveyance. Sealaska is working to get these communities the land due to them.

== Business enterprises ==
Sealaska’s primary economic drivers are natural resources, land management, environmental services, and seafood.

== Sealaska Heritage Institute ==
The Sealaska Heritage Institute is a nonprofit organization established in 1980 by Sealaska, following its conception by clan leaders, traditional scholars, and elders during the inaugural Sealaska Elders Conference. It was founded to preserve and enrich the Tlingit, Haida, and Tsimshian cultures of Southeast Alaska through various programs and services: language revitalization, the archival of ethnographic materials, early childhood literacy, art classes, subsistence living classes, and conducted research in the areas of Alaska Native history and culture.

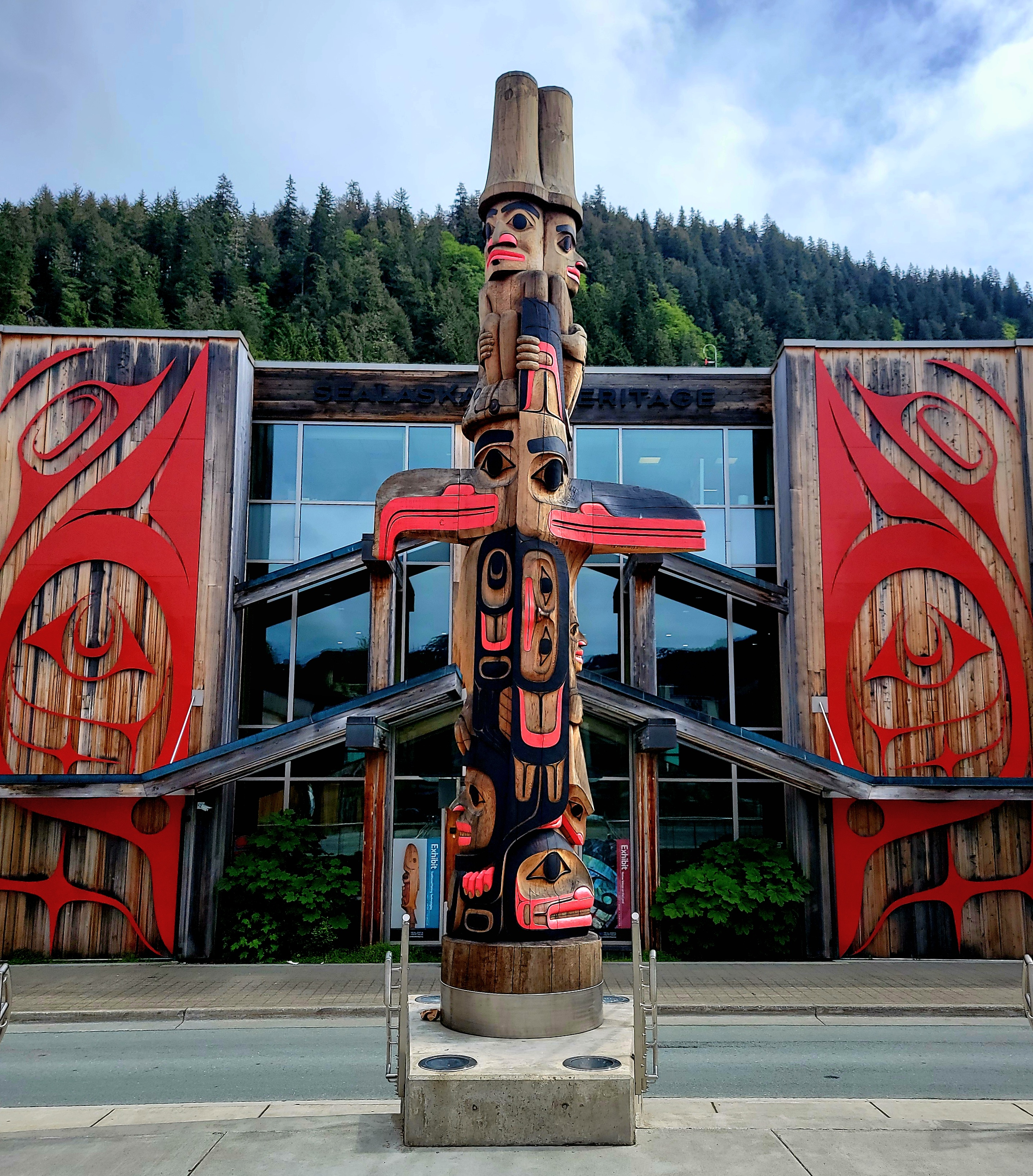
Unique totem pole at the Sealaska Corporation

In June 2022 during the biennial Celebration festival in Juneau, Alaska, the Sealaska Heritage Institute unveiled the first 360-degree totem pole in Alaska: the 6.7-metre-tall (22 ft) Sealaska Cultural Values Totem Pole. The structure, carved out of a 600-year-old cedar tree, "represents all three tribes of Southeast Alaska — Tlingit, Haida and Tsimshian."

=== Baby Raven Reads ===
The Baby Raven Reads program was initiated by the Sealaska Heritage Institute in 2017 as a pilot project. Subsequently, it secured funding to extend the program for multiple additional years and broaden its reach to encompass nine communities throughout Southeast Alaska. The program was established to enhance early literacy skills by leveraging cultural strengths to promote home literacy practices.

In 2017, the Baby Raven Reads program received recognition from the Library of Congress, being honored as a recipient of the 2017 Best Practice Honoree award.

==== Notable Baby Raven Reads Publications ====
- Salmon Boy: Shanyáak'utlaax (2017). Edited by Johnny Marks, Hans Chester, David Katzeek, and Nora and Richard Dauenhauer. Illustrated by Michaela Goade.
- Raven and the Hidden Halibut (2020). Written by the 2014-2015 fourth and fifth-grade Tlingit Culture, Language, and Literacy (TCLL) students at Harborview Elementary and illustrated by Nick Alan Foote.
- The Woman Carried Away by Killer Whales (2021). Translated into X̱aad Kíl or Haida by Skíl Jáadei Linda Schrack and Ilskyalas Delores Churchill and illustrated by Janine Gibbons.
- Celebration! (2022). Written by Lily Hope. Illustrated by Kelsey Mata.

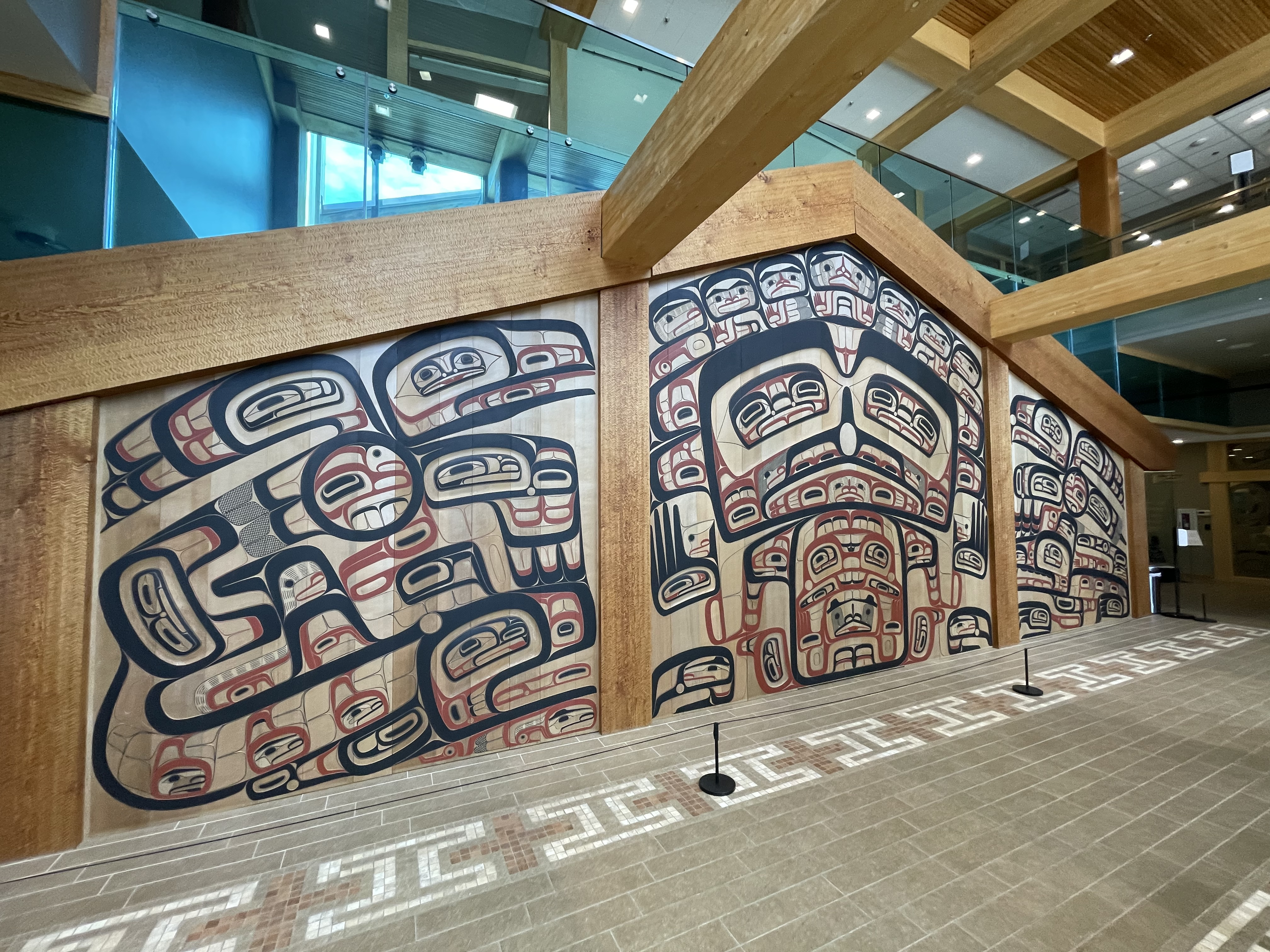
Sealaska Heritage Center, The door to the Clan House with symbols representing each of the three clans.
