= Nora Marks Dauenhauer =

Tlingit poet, short-story writer, and scholar (1927–2017)

Nora Marks Keixwnéi Dauenhauer
- Keix̱wnéi
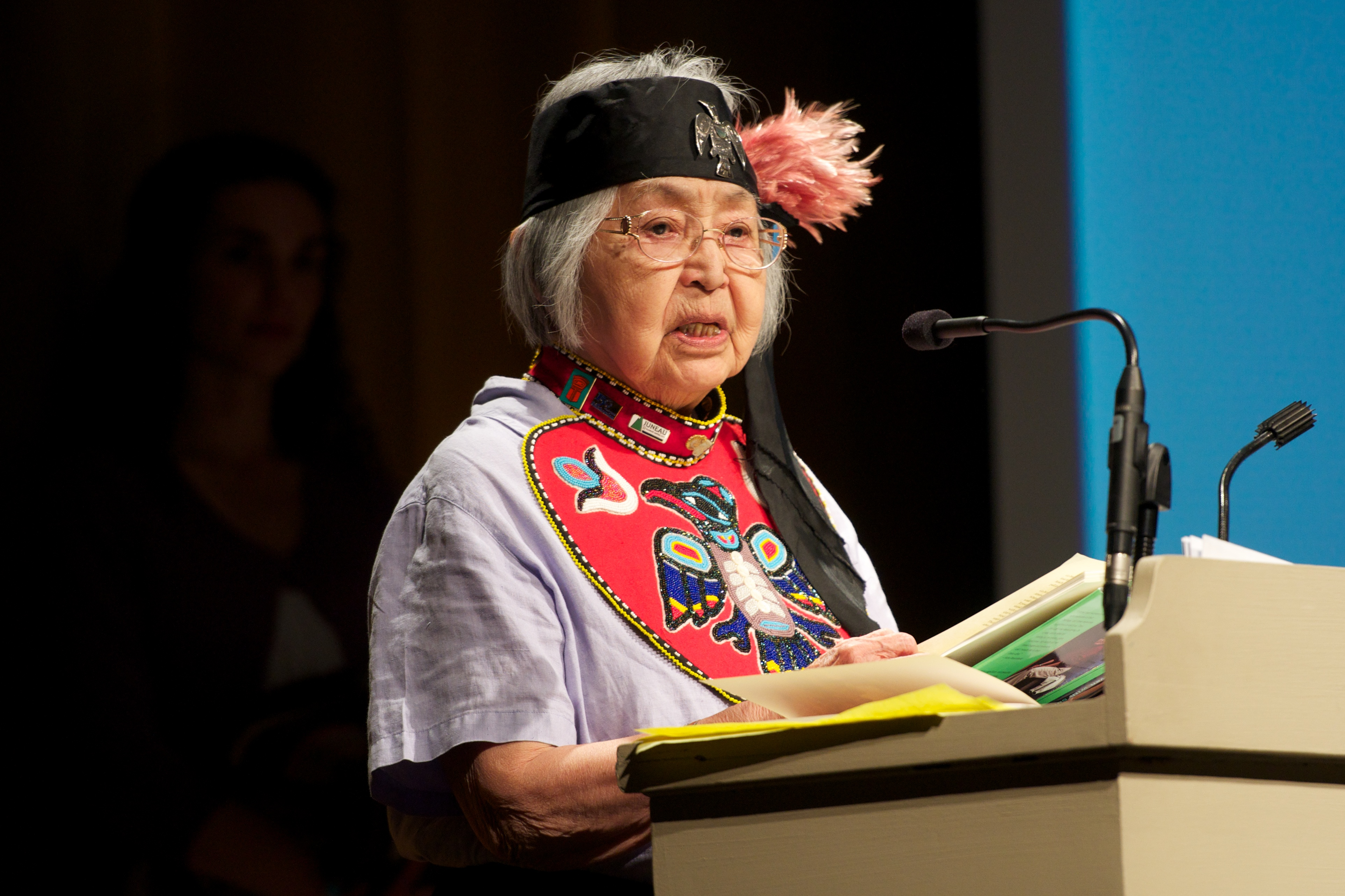
- Nora Dauenhauer in 2011
- Born: May 8, 1927; Juneau, Territory of Alaska
- Died: September 25, 2017 (aged 90); Juneau, Alaska, U.S.
- Citizenship: Tlingit
- Occupations: Poet, Tlingit Language Researcher
- Known for: Tlingit language and history writing.

Nora Marks Keixwnéi Dauenhauer (May 8, 1927 – September 25, 2017) was a Tlingit poet, short-story writer, and Tlingit language scholar from Alaska. She won an American Book Award for Russians in Tlingit America: The Battles of Sitka, 1802 And 1804. Nora was Alaska State Writer Laureate from 2012 - 2014.

== Early life ==
Nora Marks was born May 8, 1927, the first of 16 children of Emma Marks (1913–2006) of Yakutat, Alaska, and Willie Marks (1902–1981), a Tlingit from Hoonah, Alaska. Nora's Tlingit name at birth was Keix̱wnéi. Dauenhauer was raised in Juneau, Hoonah, and on seasonal hunting and fishing sites around Icy Straits, Glacier Bay, and Cape Spencer. Dauenhauer's first language was Tlingit, following her mother in the Tlingit matrilineal system, she was a member of the Raven moiety of the Tlingit nation, of the Yakutat Lukaax̱.ádi (Sockeye Salmon) clan, and of the Shaka Hít or Canoe Prow House, from Alsek River. In 1986 she was chosen as clan co-leader Yakutat Lukaax̱.ádi (Sockeye Salmon) clan. and as trustees of the Raven House and other clan property. In November 2010 she was given the title Naa Tláa (Clan Mother) as the ceremonial leader of the clan. Emma's maternal grandfather had been Frank Italio (1870–1956), an informant to the anthropologist Frederica de Laguna whose knowledge was incorporated into De Laguna's 1972 ethnography of the northern Tlingit, Under Mount St. Elias.

== Adult life ==
In the early 1970s, she married linguist Richard Dauenhauer, who had done his doctoral work on Tlingit language. Dauenhauer lived in Juneau where she: wrote, researched, and volunteered at local schools. Dauenhauer is internationally recognized for her work preserving and teaching the Tlingit language. Dauenhauer majored in anthropology and began to study herself and her roots. In an interview she remarks on how people always thought of Tlingit as being simple, but ultimately describes it as one of the hardest languages ever encountered. She and her husband collaborated and published widely on the Tlingit language. Dauenhauer continues to be internationally recognized for her work preserving and teaching the Tlingit language.

Dauenhauer had four children, 13 grandchildren, and 15 great-grandchildren.

Dauenhauer died on September 25, 2017, at the age of 90.

== Education and career ==
Dauenhauer's first language is Tlingit, she began to learn English when she entered school at the age of 8. Dauenhauer dropped out of Douglas school after the 6th grade, due to being embarrassed and mistreated by her teachers. When Dauenhauer began teaching Tlingit at Juneau High School, she went on to get her GED because when working with the high school kids she discovered that she needed help. After receiving her GED, she later went on to higher education In 1976, she earned a bachelor's degree in Anthropology from Alaska Methodist University (Alaska Pacific University). Dauenhauer researched Tlingit language for the Alaska Native Language Center at the University of Alaska, Fairbanks from 1972 to 1973. There she translated and transcribed works of Tlingit culture into books. Her books include Beginning Tlingit, published in 1976. When Dauenhauer received a National Endowment for the Humanities grant, she and her family moved to Juneau, Alaska, in 1983. There she became a principal researcher in language and cultural studies at the Sealaska Heritage Foundation from 1983 to 1997. Dauenhauer’s work was influenced by the sea and land, her work preserves the oral culture and stories of previous generations. In the year 2000, Dauenhauer published a volume of poetry and prose, known as Life Woven with Song. The collection draws its focus towards being an autoethnography of the Tlingit tribe; the volume contains short lyric poems, autobiographical pieces about Dauenhauer and her life in the northern Pacific coast, as well as a few dramatic plays that depict traditional Tlingit Raven stories. From October 10, 2012, to October 2014 she was Alaska States Poet Laureate.

== Awards ==
- 1980: Humanist of the Year by Alaska Humanities Forum
- 1989: Co-recipient with Richard Dauenhauer of Alaska's Governor Award for the Arts, Native Alaskan Artist Award
- 1991: Received the Before Columbus Foundation's American Book Award
- May 2001: Received Honorary Doctor of Humanities degree from University of Alaska Southeast
- 2005: Community Spirit Award Honoree, First Peoples Fund
- 2007: Central Council of Tlingit and Haida Indian tribes of Alaska recognized her with a lifetime achievement award.
- 2008: Received the Before Columbus Foundation's American Book Award for Anooshi Lingit Aani Ka / Russians in Tlingit America: The Battles of Sitka 1802 and 1804.
- March 2010: Inducted into Alaska Women's Hall of Fame.
- November 2011: Selected as Indigenous Leadership award honoree by Ecotrust, Salman Nation, Portland, Oregon.
- 2012 – 2014 – Alaska State Writer Laureate

== Scholarly work ==
- (1986). "Context and Display in Northwest Coast Art." New Scholar, vol. 10, pp. 419–432.
- Nora Dauenhauer; Richard Dauenhauer; Lydia Black, eds. (2008). Russians in Tlingit America. University of Washington Press. ISBN 978-0-295-98601-2.
- Stone, I. R. (2009). ANÓOSHI LINGÍT Aaní Ká: Russians In TLINGIT America: The battles Of SITKA, 1802 AND 1804. Nora Marks Dauenhauer, Richard Dauenhauer, and LYDIA T. Black (EDITORS). 2008. JUNEAU: Sealaska Heritage Institute; Seattle and LONDON: University of WASHINGTON Press. xlix + 491p, illustrated, soft cover. Isbn 978-0-295-98601-2. £19.00; $us35.00. Polar Record, 46(1), 89-90. doi:10.1017/s0032247409008572

== Creative works ==
- Dauenhauer, N. (2000). Amelia's first ski run by Nora Marks dauenhauer. Retrieved April 16, 2021, from https://www.poetryfoundation.org/poems/53445/amelias-first-ski-run
- Servid, C. (1990). The Droning Shaman by Nora Marks Dauenhauer. Western American Literature, 25(3), 279-280. doi:10.1353/wal.1990.0133

== Collaborative works ==
- Dauenhauer, N., & Dauenhauer, R. (1981). "Because we cherish you ...: Sealaska elders speak to the future. Juneau, AK: Sealaska Heritage Foundation Press.
- Dauenhauer, N., & Dauenhauer, R. (1987) Haa Shuká, Our Ancestors: Tlingit Oral Narratives. (Classics of Tlingit Oral Literature, vol. 1.) Seattle: University of Washington Press.
- Dauenhauer, N., & Dauenhauer, R. (1990) Haa Tuwanáagu Yís, for Healing Our Spirit: Tlingit Oratory. (Classics of Tlingit Oral Literature, vol. 2.) Seattle: University of Washington Press.
- Dauenhauer, N., & Dauenhauer, R. (1994) Haa Kusteeyí, Our Culture: Tlingit Life Stories. (Classics of Tlingit Oral Literature, vol. 3.) Seattle: University of Washington Press.
- Dauenhauer, N. M., & Dauenhauer, R. (1998). Technical, emotional, and ideological issues in reversing Language SHIFT: Examples from Southeast Alaska. Endangered Languages, 57-98. doi:10.1017/cbo9781139166959.004

== Critical works ==
- Bataille, Gretchen M; Lisa, Laurie (1993). Native American women : a biographical dictionary. Garland publishing. p. 73-74. ISBN 9780824052676.
- De Laguna, Frederica (1972) Under Mount St. Elias. 3 vols. Washington: Smithsonian Institution Press.
- Osgood, K. (1990). Anóoshi LINGÍT Aaní Ká: Russians In Tlingit America; the battles Of Sitka, 1802 and 1804. Polar Geography, 36(3), 245-246.
- Wiget, A., & Ortiz, S. J. (1985). Earth power coming: Short fiction in native american literature. American Indian Quarterly, 9(1), 155-161. doi:10.2307/1184681

== See also ==
- Native American Studies
- List of writers from peoples indigenous to the Americas
- Alaska Women's Hall of Fame
