= Apple in the Middle =

2018 middle-grade novel by Dawn Quigley

- Book cover
- Author: Dawn Quigley
- Language: English
- Genre: Children's literature, Middle-grade fiction, Coming of age
- Publisher: North Dakota State University Press
- Publication date: August 2, 2018
- Media type: Print

Apple in the Middle is a middle-grade novel written by Dawn Quigley, published August 2, 2018 by North Dakota State University Press.

== Reception ==
School Library Journal called Apple in the Middle "a strong story with themes that resonate with many adolescents as they try to figure out who they are in life." The Montessori Book Review called it a "powerful and moving" book that "explores the complexities of identity, culture, and family history".

Awards for Apple in the Middle
Year	Award/Honor	Result	Ref.
2018	Moonbeam Gold Award	Winner	
2019	Independent Publisher Book Award for Young Adult Fiction	Winner	
2019	WILLA Literary Award for Young Adult Fiction and Nonfiction	Nominee	
2020	American Indian Youth Literature Award	Nominee	
2020	Great Lakes Great Books	Nominee	
2020	North Dakota Library Association's Flicker Tales	Nominee	
