= Christine Day (author) =

Indigenous American author of children's books

- Occupation: Author
- Citizenship: American
- Education: University of Washington
- Genre: Middle grade fiction

Website
- bychristineday.com

Christine Day is an Indigenous American author of children's books. She is a member of the Upper Skagit Indian Tribe. Her novel We Still Belong won the American Indian Youth Literature Award for middle school book, and three of her books have received American Indian Youth Literature Award honors.

Day grew up in Seattle. Her mother was adopted prior to the Indian Child Welfare Act, which inspired her debut novel, I Can Make This Promise.

As a child, she attended a ballet program with Pacific Northwest Ballet School, where she learned about Maria Tallchief. Later, when approached about adapting Clinton and Boiger's picture book about Tallchief, she was thrilled at the opportunity.

Day received a master's degree from the University of Washington. For her thesis, she studied Coast Salish weaving traditions.

== Awards and honors ==
In 2019, the Chicago Public Library, Kirkus Reviews, NPR included I Can Make This Promise on their list of the best books of the year.

The Sea in Winter is a Junior Library Guild book. Kirkus Reviews also included it on their list of the best children's books of 2021.

Awards for Day's writing
Year	Title	Award	Result	Ref.
2020	I Can Make This Promise	ALSC Notable Children's Books	Selection	
2020	I Can Make This Promise	American Indian Youth Literature Award for Best Middle School Book	Honor	
2020	I Can Make This Promise	Charlotte Huck Award	Honor	
2021	I Can Make This Promise	Rise: A Feminist Book Project	Selection	
2022	I Can Make This Promise	Rebecca Caudill Young Readers' Book Award	Nominee	
2022	The Sea in Winter	ALSC Notable Children's Books	Selection	
2022	The Sea in Winter	American Indian Youth Literature Award for Best Middle School Book	Honor	
2022	The Sea in Winter	Pacific Northwest Booksellers Association Award	Shortlist	
2024	We Still Belong	American Indian Youth Literature Award for Best Middle School Book	Winner	
2024	She Persisted: Maria Tallchief	American Indian Youth Literature Award for Best Middle School Book	Honor	

== Publications ==
=== Books ===
- I Can Make This Promise, HarperCollins, (2019)
- The Sea in Winter, Heartdrum, ISBN 978-0-062-87204-3 (2021)
- She Persisted: Maria Tallchief, adapted from the picture book by Chelsea Clinton and Alexandra Boiger and illustrated by Gillian Flint, Philomel Books, ISBN 978-0-593-11581-7 (2021).
- We Still Belong, Heartdrum, ISBN 978-0-063-06456-0 (expected 2023).

=== Contributions ===
- "Unexpected Pursuits: Embracing My Indigeneity & Creativity" in Our Stories, Our Voices: 21 YA Authors Get Real About Injustice, Empowerment, and Growing Up Female in America, edited by Amy Reed, Simon Pulse, ISBN 978-1-534-40901-9 (2018)
- "What We Know About Glaciers" in Ancestor Approved: Intertribal Stories for Kids, edited by Cynthia Leitich Smith, Heartdrum, ISBN 978-0-062-86994-4 (2021)
