= Hearts Unbroken =

2018 young adult novel by Cynthia Leitich Smith

- Cover of Hearts Unbroken
- Author: Cynthia Leitich Smith
- Language: English
- Genre: Young adult literature, Romance
- Publisher: Candlewick Press
- Publication date: October 9, 2018
- Media type: Print

Hearts Unbroken is a young adult romance novel written by Cynthia Leitich Smith, published October 9, 2018 by Candlewick Press.

The book received the American Indian Youth Literature Award for Young Adult Book in 2020.

Hearts Unbroken is set in the same universe as Leitich Smith's Rain Is Not My Indian Name; the protagonists are cousins.

== Reception ==
Hearts Unbroken received a starred review from School Library Journal, positive reviews from the Bulletin of the Center for Children's Books, The Horn Book, and Booklist, as well as mediocre reviews from Publishers Weekly, and Kirkus.

The book also received the following accolades:

- Neustadt Lit Fest Booklist (2021)
- All Iowa Reads! Books for Teens shortlist (2021)
- American Indian Youth Literature Award for Young Adult Book winner (2020)
- Teaching for Change: Social Justice Books Selection (2020)
- Spotlight on Diversity Title, New England Book Show (2020)
- The Amelia Bloomer Book List selection (2019)
- Outstanding Books for the College Bound: Literature and Language Arts selection (2019)
- Bank Street Best Books List (2019)
- Foreword Reviews SILVER Winner for Young Adult Fiction (2018)
- Read In Color Recommended Reading List (2021)
