= Dawn Quigley =

Ojibwe-American author and educator

Dawn Quigley is an author and educator. She is an enrolled member of the Turtle Mountain Band of Ojibwe, North Dakota. Her first book, Apple in the Middle, was nominated for the American Indian Youth Literature Award and the WILLA Literary Award.

Quigley attended the University of Minnesota, where she received a Bachelor of Arts degree in English, a Master of Education degree and Doctor of Philosophy degree in Curriculum and Instruction, as well as middle school endorsements in Math and English Language Arts. She also received certificates in K–6 Elementary Education and K–12 Literacy from Augsburg College.

Quigley taught English Language Arts in K–12 schools for 18 years and was an Indian Education program co-director. She is currently an assistant professor at St. Catherine University, where she teaches in the Education Department. Her research interests lie in teacher education, Native American literature, and Indigenous research methods. Her scholarly writing has been published in Social Identities and American Indian Quarterly.

== Publications ==
- Apple in the Middle, published August 2, 2018 by North Dakota State University Press
  - American Indian Youth Literature Award nominee (2020)
  - WILLA Literary Award for Young Adult Fiction and Nonfiction nominee (2019)
  - North Dakota Library Association's Flicker Tales nominee (2020)
  - Great Lakes Great Books nominee (2020)
  - Independent Press Award for Young Adult Fiction winner (2019)
  - Moonbeam Gold Award winner (2018)
- Native American Heroes, published 2019 by Scholastic
- Ancestor Approved: Intertribal Stories for Kids, published February 9, 2021 by Heartdrum
- Jo Jo Makoons: The Used-to-be Best Friend, illustrated by Tara Audibert, published May 11, 2021 by Heartdrum
- Jo Jo Makoons: Fancy Pants, published May 10, 2022 by Heartdrum
- Jo Jo Makoons: Snow Day, published September 19, 2023 by Heartdrum
- Jo Jo Makoons: Rule School, published September 10, 2024 by Heartdrum
- Jo Jo Makoons: The Super-Scary Sleepover, published September 16, 2025 by Heartdrum
