= Legendary Frybread Drive-In =

2025 anthology edited by Cynthia Leitich Smith

- Editor: Cynthia Leitich Smith
- Genre: Anthology
- Publisher: HarperCollins/Heartdrum
- Publication date: August 26, 2025
- Pages: 352
- ISBN: 9780063314269

Legendary Frybread Drive-In: Intertribal Stories is a 2025 short story anthology edited by Cynthia Leitich Smith. It features eighteen stories all by Indigenous authors, each of which follows an Indigenous teen who finds themself at the mystical Sandy June's Legendary Frybread Drive-In, which spontaneously manifests across Turtle Island. The anthology was the 2026 recipient of the Michael L. Printz Award.

== Stories ==
- "Maybe It Starts" by Kate Hart
- "House of Stray Cats" by Eric Gansworth
- "Mvskoke Joy" by Marcella Bell
- "Game Night" by Darcie Little Badger
- "Look Away" by Karina Iceberg
- "Patent Red" by Cynthia Leitich Smith
- "Braving the Storm" by Kaua Māhoe Adams
- "You Had One Job" by Andrea L. Rogers
- "Heart Berry" by Cheryl Isaacs
- "Momentum" by Christine Hartman Derr
- "I Love You, Grandson" by Brian Young
- "The Rest Will Come" by K. A. Cobell
- "Language Lesson" by Jen Ferguson
- "Hearts Aflutter" by A. J. Eversole
- "Love Buzz" by Byron Graves
- "Jilly Bean and Jessa Jean" by Angeline Boulley
- "Kathy's Poem" by David A. Robertson
- "Open Mic at the Drive-In" by Cynthia Leitich Smith

== Reception ==
Legendary Frybread Drive-In received starred reviews from Kirkus Reviews, School Library Journal, and Booklist. Angela Carstensen of Booklist wrote that the book was "a terrific collection of entertaining stories—full of laughter, music, delicious food, friendship, and romance—that will appeal to teen readers across age ranges, identities, and interests." Kirkus Reviews noted the inclusion of both prose and verse stories and the variety of genres depicted, and further stated "even when the setting is fantastical, the well-wrought characterizations are rooted in realism." Legendary Frybread Drive-In was also positively reviewed by Publishers Weekly

=== Accolades ===
| Year | Award/Honor | Result | Ref. |
|---|---|---|---|
| 2026 | Michael L. Printz Award | Won | |
| 2026 | American Indian Youth Literature Award - Young Adult | Won | |
| 2026 | Odyssey Award (for audiobook adaption) | Honored | |
| 2026 | Amazing Audiobooks for Young Adults | Top Ten | |
