= NotYourPrincess =

2017 young adult anthology

#NotYourPrincess
- First edition
- Editors: Mary Beth Leatherdale; Lisa Charleyboy
- Published: Annick Press
- Publication date: September 12, 2017
- ISBN: 978-1554519576

#NotYourPrincess: Voices of Native American Women is a 2017 young adult anthology edited by Lisa Charleyboy and Mary Beth Leatherdale, and published by Annick Press. The content is by multiple contemporary artists from North America and Canada. It received the American Indian Youth Literature Award and Norma Fleck Award in 2018.

== Themes ==
The book contains poems, essays, and art about what it is like to be an indigenous woman or girl. The work has broad themes of sexual and drug abuse, discrimination, and silence.

== Authors ==
- Claire Anderson (Tlingit)
- Joanne Arnott (Métis)
- Gwen Benaway (Anishinaabe/Métis)
- Nathalie Bertin (Métis)
- September Big Crow (Tsuu T'ina Nation)
- Maria Campbell (Metis)
- Imajyn Cardinal (Cree/Dene)
- Adrianne Chalepah (Kiowa/Apache)
- Lianne Charlie (Tagé Cho Hudän)
- Dana Claxton (Hunkpapa Lakota)
- Francine Cunningham (Cree/Métis)
- Jessica Deer (Mohawk)
- Rosanna Deerchild (Cree)
- Kelly Edzerza-Bapty (Tahltan)
- Melanie Fey (Diné)
- Isabella Fillspipe (Oglala Lakota)
- Nahanni Fontaine (Anishinaabe)
- Hazel Hedgecoke (Sioux/Hunkpapa/Wendat/Métis/Cherokee/Creek)
- Helen Knott (Dane Zaa/Cree)
- Winona LaDuke (Anishinaabe/Ojibwe)
- Cecilia Rose LaPointe (Ojibway/Métis)
- Gloria Larocque Campbell Moses (Sturgeon Lake Cree Nation, Northern Alberta)
- Winona Linn (Maliseet)
- Brigitte Lacquette (Ojibwe)
- Shelby Lisk (Mohawk)
- Ashton Locklear (Lumbee)
- Madelaine McCallum (Cree/Métis)
- Lee Maracle (Stó:lō Nation)
- Tiffany Midge (Hunkpapa Lakota)
- Saige Mukash (Cree)
  - Saige Mukash is a Cree photographer, illustrator, published writer, an ink-based artist, and an expert beader. Saige Mukuash prefers the pronouns they and them. They are from Whapmagoostui, Quebec. Saige focuses on four special categories which are racial issues, climate and the environment, LGBTQ + issues and female-identifying photographers. They started a trend on social trend on social media challenge called “Bead this in your style”, to encourage beaders of different levels to express themselves and show their design/work from one of her drawings. The challenge first started in June 2018. Saige prefers social media to showcase their work because it is easier than going to shows or events.
- Pamela J. Peters (Navajo)
- Ntawnis Piapot (Piapot Cree Nation)
- Zoey Roy (Cree/Dene/Métis)
- Shoni Schimmel (Umatilla)
- Leanne Simpson (Michi Saagiig Nishnaabeg)
- Janet Smylie (Cree/Métis)
- Tasha Spillett (Cree)
- Patty Stonefish (Lakota)
- DeLanna Studi (Cherokee)
- Jen VanStrander (Western Band of Cherokee)
- Tanaya Winder
- AnnaLee Rain Yellowhammer (Hunkpapa/Standing Rock Sioux)

== Reception ==
#NotYourPrincess has received positive critical reviews. Karen MacPherson wrote in The Washington Post, "Provocative, thoughtful and sometimes humorous, this book showcases tenacious and talented indigenous women ready to take on the world." Publishers Weekly described it as, "a moving and powerful collection that draws strength from the variety of voices and lived experiences it represents." In a starred review, Kirkus called #NotYourPrincess "both testament to the complexity of Indigenous women’s identities and ferocious statement that these women fully inhabit the modern world."

#NotYourPrincess received the following accolades:

- American Indian Youth Literature Award for Best Young Adult Book (2018)
- Norma Fleck Award (2018)
- Young Adult Library Services Association Award for Excellence in Nonfiction finalist (2018)
- Amelia Bloomer Book List Top Ten
- Kirkus Best Book of 2017 in the Teen category
