= American Indian Youth Literature Awards =

Literary award

The American Indian Library Association (AILA) awards are presented every two years to recognize the most outstanding contributions to children's literature by and about American Indians. The awards were established as a way to identify and honor the very best writing and illustrations by and about American Indians. Books selected to receive the award will present American Indians in the fullness of their humanity in the present and past contexts.

== History ==
The first American Indian Library Association American Indian Youth Literature Awards were presented during the Joint Conference of Librarians of Color in 2006.

== Criteria ==
- Authors (for illustrated books, both author AND illustrator) must be recognized by the Native community of which they claim to be a part and be connected to the people of that community.
- For anthologies, at least two thirds of the authors must be recognized members of the community to which they claim affiliation.
- Books must have been published after October of the year before the last awards were given (i.e., the odd-numbered year preceding the previous award cycle; after October 2017 for the 2020 awards, etc.).
- Indigenous-language text and audio materials are encouraged, and every effort will be made to provide accurate translation for the committee when possible, but the committee’s common language is English.
- Books may be nominated for consideration by the AIYLA Jury, publishers, librarians, authors, illustrators, and others.
- The Awards go beyond merely naming the best creator of a particular art form in a certain year to representing the ideals of our multiple communities. Native authors and illustrators are role models for young people. For that reason, AILA does not endorse authors who appropriate other cultures or who behave in ways that dishonor others.

Up to 5 honor books may be selected in each category.

== Recipients ==
American Indian Youth Literature Award Winners
Year	Category	Recipient	Title	Citation
2006	Best Picture Book	Confederated Salish and Kootenai Tribes (author) with Johnny Arlee (contributor) and Sam Sandoval (illustrator)	Beaver Steals Fire: A Salish Coyote Story	Winner
2006	Best Middle School Book	Louise Erdrich	The Birchbark House	Winner
2006	Best Young Adult Book	Joseph Bruchac	Hidden Roots	Winner
2008	Best Picture Book	Tim Tingle (author) with Jeanne Rorex Bridges (illustrator)	Crossing Bok Chitto: A Choctaw Tale of Friendship & Freedom	Winner
2008	Best Middle School Book	Joseph Medicine Crow	Counting Coup: Becoming a Crow Chief on the Reservation and Beyond	Winner
2008	Best Young Adult Book	~~Sherman Alexie~~	~~The Absolutely True Diary of a Part-Time Indian~~	~~Winner~~ (Rescinded 2018)
2010	Best Picture Book	Thomas King (author) with Gary Clement (illustrator)	A Coyote Solstice Tale	Winner
2010	Best Middle School Book	Genevieve Simermeyer	Meet Christopher: An Osage Indian Boy from Oklahoma	Winner
2010	Best Young Adult Book	Lurline Wailana McGregor	Between the Deep Blue Sea and Me	Winner
2012	Best Picture Book	Virginia Driving Hawk Sneve (author) with Ellen Beier (illustrator)	The Christmas Coat	Winner
2012	Best Picture Book	Tim Tingle (author) with Karen Clarkson (illustrator)	Saltypie: a Choctaw Journey from Darkness into Light	Honor
2012	Best Picture Book	Kekauleleanae'ole Kawai'ae'a (author) with Aaron Kawai'ae'a (illustrator)	Kohala Kuamo'o: Nae'ole's Race to Save a King	Honor
2012	Best Picture Book	Robert Lono Ikuwa (author) with Matthew Kawika Ortiz (illustrator)	Mohala Mai 'o Hau How Hau Became Hau'ula (English)	Honor
2012	Best Picture Book	Margaret Manuel	I See Me	Honor
2012	Best Middle School Book	Jacqueline Guest	Free Throw & Triple Threat	Winner
2012	Best Middle School Book	Melanie Florence	Jordin Tootoo: the Highs and Lows in the Journey to the First Inuit to Play in the NHL	Honor
2012	Best Middle School Book	Anton Treuer et al.	Awesiinyensag: Dibaajimowinan ji-Gikinoo'amaageng	Honor
2012	Best Middle School Book	Victor Schilling	Native Defenders of the Environment and other titles in the "Native Trailblazers series.	Honor
2012	Best Young Adult Book	Adam Fortunate Eagle	Pipestone: My Life in an Indian Boarding School	Winner
2014	Best Picture Book	Tomson Highway (author) with John Rombough (illustrator)	Caribou Song, Atihko Oonagamoon	Winner
2014	Best Middle School Book	Tim Tingle	How I Became a Ghost: A Choctaw Trail of Tears Story	Winner
2014	Best Middle School Book	Tim Tingle	Danny Blackgoat, Navajo Prisoner	Honor
2014	Best Young Adult Book	Joseph Bruchac	Killer of Enemies	Winner
2014	Best Young Adult Book	Eric Gansworth	If I Ever Get Out of Here	Honor
2016	Best Picture Book	Richard Van Camp (author) with Julie Flett (illustrator)	Little You	Winner
2016	Best Picture Book	S. D. Nelson	Sitting Bull: Lakota Warrior and Defender of His People	Honor
2016	Best Middle School Book	Joseph Marshall III (author) with James Mark Yellowhawk (illustrator)	In the Footsteps of Crazy Horse	Winner
2016	Best Middle School Book	Lisa Charleyboy and Mary Beth Leatherdale (editors)	Dreaming in Indian Contemporary Native Voices	Honor
2016	Best Young Adult Book	Tim Tingle	House of Purple Cedar	Winner
2016	Best Young Adult Book	Evangeline Parsons Yazzie	Her Land, Her Love	Honor
2018	Best Picture Book	Johnny Marks, Hans Chester, David Katzeek, Nora Dauenhauer, and Richard Dauenhauer (editors) with Michaela Goade (illustrator),	Shanyaak'utlaax: Salmon Boy	Winner
2018	Best Middle School Book	Arigon Starr (editor) with Theo Tso, Jonathan Nelson, Kristina Bad Hand, Roy Boney Jr., Lee Francis IV, Johnnie Diacon, Weshoyot Alvitre, Renee Nejo, and Michael Sheyahshe (contributors)	Tales of the Mighty Code Talkers, Volume 1	Winner
2018	Best Young Adult Book	Lisa Charleyboy and Mary Beth Leatherdale (editors)	# Not Your Princess: Voices of Native American Women	Winner
2020	Best Picture Book	Brenda J. Child (author) with Gordon Jourdain (translator) and Jonathan Thunder (illustrator)	Bowwow Powwow: Bagosenjige-niimi’idim	Winner
2020	Best Picture Book	Kevin Noble Maillard (author) with Juana Martinez-Neal (illustrator)	Fry Bread: A Native American Family Story	Honor
2020	Best Picture Book	Julie Flett (author and illustrator)	Birdsong	Honor
2020	Best Picture Book	Traci Sorell (author) with Weshoyot Alvitre (illustrator)	At the Mountain's Base	Honor
2020	Best Picture Book	Traci Sorell (author) with Frané Lessac (illustrator)	We Are Grateful: Otsaliheliga	Honor
2020	Best Picture Book	Janine Gibbons (adaptor and illustrator)	Raven Makes the Aleutians	Honor
2020	Best Middle Grade Book	Charlene Willing McManis (author) with Traci Sorell	Indian No More	Winner
2020	Best Middle Grade Book	Christine Day	I Can Make This Promise	Honor
2020	Best Middle Grade Book	Hetxw’ms Gyetxw (author) with Natasha Donovan (illustrator)	The Grizzly Mother	Honor
2020	Best Young Adult Book	Cynthia Leitich Smith (author)	Hearts Unbroken	Winner
2020	Best Young Adult Book	Tasha Spillett (author) with Natasha Donovan (Illustrator)	Surviving the City	Honor
2020	Best Young Adult Book	Angela Hovak Johnston (author) with Cora De Vos (photography)	Reawakening Our Ancestors’ Lines: Revitalizing Inuit Traditional Tattooing	Honor
2020	Best Young Adult Book	Debbie Reese and Jean Mendoza (authors), adapted from Roxanne Dunbar-Ortiz's An Indigenous Peoples’ History of the United States	An Indigenous Peoples’ History of the United States for Young People	Honor
2020	Best Young Adult Book	Dawn Quigley	Apple in the Middle	Honor
2022	Best Picture Book	Daniel W. Vandever (author) with Corey Begay (illus.)	Herizon	Winner
2022	Best Picture Book	Morgan Asoyuf	Learning My Rights with Mousewoman	Honor
2022	Best Picture Book	Traci Sorell (author) with Natasha Donovan (illustrator)	Classified: The Secret Career of Mary Golda Ross, Cherokee Aerospace Engineer	Honor
2022	Best Picture Book	Jolyana Begay-Kroupa (author) with Corey Begay (designer)	Diné Bich’eekę Yishłeeh (Diné Bizaad) / Becoming Miss Navajo (English)	Honor
2022	Best Picture Book	Tasha Spillett-Sumner (author) with Michaela Goade (illustrator)	I Sang You Down From the Stars	Honor
2022	Best Picture Book	Traci Sorell (author) with Frané Lessac (illustrator)	We Are Still Here! Native American Truths Everyone Should Know	Honor
2022	Best Middle School	Brian Young	Healer of the Water Monster	Winner
2022	Best Middle School	Katrina M. Phillips (author) with Tashia Hart (illustrator)	Indigenous Peoples’ Day	Honor
2022	Best Middle School	Diane Wilson (author) with Tashia Hart (Illustrator)	Ella Cara Deloria: Dakota Language Protector	Honor
2022	Best Middle School	Jessica Engelking (author) with Tashia Hart (Illustrator)	Peggy Flanagan: Ogimaa Kwe, Lieutenant Governor	Honor
2022	Best Middle School	Christine Day	The Sea in Winter	Honor
2022	Best Middle School	Dawn Quigley (author) with Tara Audibert (illustrator)	Jo Jo Makoons: The Used-to-Be Best Friend	Honor
2022	Best Young Adult	Eric Gansworth	Apple (Skin to the Core)	Winner
2022	Best Young Adult	Chag Lowry (author) with Rahsan Ekedal (illustrator)	Soldiers Unknown	Honor
2022	Best Young Adult	Adrienne Keene (author) with Ciara Sana (illustrator)	Notable Native People: 50 Indigenous Leaders, Dreamers, and Changemakers from Past and Present	Honor
2022	Best Young Adult	Cherie Dimaline	Hunting by Stars	Honor
2022	Best Young Adult	Darcie Little Badger	Elatsoe	Honor
2022	Best Young Adult	Angeline Boulley	Firekeeper’s Daughter	Honor
2024	Best Picture Book	Laurel Goodluck (author) with Jonathan Nelson (illustrator)	Forever Cousins	Winner
2024	Best Picture Book	Kim Rogers (author) with Jonathan Nelson (illustrator)	A Letter for Bob	Winner
2024	Best Picture Book	Lily Hope (author) with Kelsey Mata Foote (illustrator)	Celebration	Honor
2024	Best Picture Book	Traci Sorell (author) with Arigon Starr (illustrator)	Contenders	Honor
2024	Best Picture Book	Michaela Goade	Berry Song	Honor
2024	Best Picture Book	Joy Harjo (author) with Michaela Goade (illustrator)	Remember	Honor
2024	Best Picture Book	Laurel Goodluck (author) with Madelyn Goodnight (illustrator)	Rock Your Mocs	Honor
2024	Best Middle School	Christine Day	We Still Belong	Winner
2024	Best Middle School	Nasuġraq Rainey Hopson	Eagle Drums	Honor
2024	Best Middle School	Traci Sorell and Charles Waters	Mascot	Honor
2024	Best Middle School	Dawn Quigley (author) with Tara Audibert (illustrator)	Jo Jo Makoons: Fancy Pants	Honor
2024	Best Middle School	Dawn Quigley (author) with Tara Audibert (illustrator)	Jo Jo Makoons: Snow Day	Honor
2024	Best Middle School	Christine Day (author) with Alexandra Boiger and Gillian Flint (illustrators)	She Persisted: Maria Tallchief	Honor
2024	Best Middle School	Traci Sorell (author) with Alexandra Boiger and Gillian Flint (illustrators)	She Persisted: Wilma Mankiller	Honor
2024	Best Middle School	Laurel Goodluck (author) with Alexandra Boiger and Gillian Flint (illustrators)	She Persisted: Deb Haaland	Honor
2024	Best Young Adult	Byron Graves	Rez Ball	Winner
2024	Best Young Adult	Angeline Boulley	Warrior Girl Unearthed	Honor
2024	Best Young Adult	Cherie Dimaline	Funeral Songs for Dying Girls	Honor
2024	Best Young Adult	Andrea L. Rogers (author) and Jeff Edwards	Man Made Monsters	Honor
2024	Best Young Adult	Lorinda Martinez	Running with Changing Woman	Honor
2024	Best Young Adult	Brian Young	Heroes of the Water Monster	Honor
2026	Best Picture Book	Andrea L. Rogers (author) with Rebecca Lee Kunz (illustrator)	Chooch Helped	Winner
2026	Best Picture Book	Pasha Westbrook (author) with Madelyn Goodnight (illustrator	Braided Roots	Honor
2026	Best Picture Book	Laurel Goodluck (author) with Steph Littlebird (illustrator)	Fierce Aunties!	Honor
2026	Best Picture Book	Joy Harjo (author) with Adriana Garcia (illustrator)	For a Girl Becoming	Honor
2026	Best Picture Book	Tasha Spillett (author) with Daniel Ramirez (illustrator)	Raven's Ribbons	Honor
2026	Best Picture Book	Daniel W. Vandever (author) with Deonoveigh Mitchell (illustrator)	We Weave	Honor
2026	Best Middle School	Violet Duncan	Buffalo Dreamer	Winner
2026	Best Middle School	Dawn Quigley (author) with Tara Audibert (illustrator)	Jo Jo Makoons: The Super-Scary Sleepover	Honor
2026	Best Middle School	Trina Rathgeber (author) with Alina Pete and Jillian Dolan (illustrators)	Lost at Windy River: A True Story of Survival	Honor
2026	Best Middle School	Elise McMullen-Ciotti	Outfoxed	Honor
2026	Best Middle School	Dawn Quigley (author) with Tara Audibert (illustrator)	Red Bird Danced	Honor
2026	Best Middle School	Cameron Mukwa (author and illustrator)	The Ribbon Skirt	Honor
2026	Best Middle School	Virginia Driving Hawk Sneve (author) with Steph Littlebird (illustrator)	The Summer of the Bone Horses	Honor
2026	Best Young Adult	Cynthia Leitich Smith (editor)	Legendary Frybread Drive-In	Winner
2026	Best Young Adult	Darcie Little Badger (author) with Rovina Cai (illustrator)	Sheine Lende: A Prequel to Elatsoe	Honot
2026	Best Young Adult	Angeline Boulley	Sisters in the Wind	Honot
2026	Best Young Adult	Arigon Starr (author and illustrator)	Super Indian Volume Three	Honot
2026	Best Young Adult	Cheryl Isaacs	The Unfinished	Honot
2026	Best Young Adult	Anton Treuer	Where Wolves Don’t Die	Honot
