= Traci Sorell =

Cherokee author

Traci Sorell is an Indigenous author of fiction and nonfiction works for children and teens. She is an enrolled citizen of the Cherokee Nation.

== Personal lifestyle ==
Sorell has spent much of her life living within the Cherokee Nation tribe's reservation in northeastern Oklahoma and currently resides with her family by Fort Gibson Lake. Her mother's family has lived in the area since 1838 when Cherokee people were removed from their homelands. She has a younger brother and sister.

As a child, Sorell learned about her ancestors from her grandmother, fishing with her family, and caring for animals and the land. She also enjoyed reading, singing, and performing in theater productions.

When Sorell was a teenager, she and her family moved to Southern California, and she became the first person in her family to graduate from college. Her mother, sister, and brother later received degrees as well.

Sorell's second language is Spanish, though she is learning the Cherokee language.

== Education ==
Sorell majored in Native American Studies and minored in Ethnic Studies at the University of California, Berkeley graduating with a Bachelor of Arts in 1994. During her time at Berkeley, Sorell lived in Madrid and taught English and Spanish to children and adults.

In 1996, she received a Master of Arts from the University of Arizona, where she studied American Indian Studies with a concentration in Federal Indian Law & Policy.

Later, Sorell returned to school and received a Juris Doctor degree from the University of Wisconsin Law School in 2001.

== Career ==
Sorell began her career by helping Native Nations and their citizens by writing "legal codes, testimony for Congressional hearings, federal budget requests, grants and reports."

Since beginning her writing career, Sorell has continued to focus on incorporating culturally accurate books about Cherokee and other Indigenous people into the canon of literature for children and young adults.

Sorell was a Tulsa Artist Fellow in 2021 and 2022.

== Awards and honors ==
Seven of Sorell's books are Junior Library Guild selections, including Clack, Clack! Smack!, Mascot, Indian No More, Powwow Day, We Are Still Here!, We Are Grateful: Otsaliheliga, and Classified.

Awards and honors for Sorell's books
Year	Title	Award/Honor	Result	Ref.
2018	We Are Grateful: Otsaliheliga	Reading the West Book Award	Winner	
2019	We Are Grateful: Otsaliheliga	Boston Globe–Horn Book Award	Honor	
2019	We Are Grateful: Otsaliheliga	Orbis Pictus Award	Honor	
2019	We Are Grateful: Otsaliheliga	Robert F. Sibert Informational Book Award	Honor	
2019	We Are Grateful: Otsaliheliga	ALA Notable Children's Books	Selection	
2020	At the Mountain's Base	ALA Notable Children's Books	Selection	
2020	At the Mountain's Base	American Indian Youth Literature Award	Honor	
2020	At the Mountain's Base	Rise: A Feminist Book List	Top 10	
2020	Indian No More	ALA Notable Children's Books	Selection	
2020	Indian No More	American Indian Youth Literature Award	Winner	
2020	We Are Grateful: Otsaliheliga	American Indian Youth Literature Award	Honor	
2020	We Are Grateful: Otsaliheliga	Audie Award for Young Listeners' Title	Finalist	
2020	We Are Grateful: Otsaliheliga	Odyssey Award	Honor	
2022	At the Mountain's Base	ALA Notable Children's Recordings	Selection	
2022	We Are Still Here!	ALA Notable Children's Recordings	Selection	
2022	We Are Still Here!	American Indian Youth Literature Award	Honor	
2022	We Are Still Here!	Robert F. Sibert Informational Book Award	Honor	
2022	Classified	American Indian Youth Literature Award	Honor	
2022	Classified	Orbis Pictus Award	Honor	
2022	Classified	Rise: A Feminist Book List	Selection	
2024	Contenders: Two Native Baseball Players, One World Series	Carter G. Woodson Book Award	Winner	
2024	Contenders: Two Native Baseball Players, One World Series	American Indian Youth Literature Award	Honor	
2024	Mascot	American Indian Youth Literature Award	Honor	
2024	She Persisted: Wilma Mankiller	American Indian Youth Literature Award	Honor	

== Publications ==
=== Ages Birth-3 ===
- On Powwow Day, colors-numbers-sound words board book, illustrated by Madelyn Goodnight (2024)
- We Are Grateful: Seasons, four board book set in English only, illustrated by Frané Lessac (2024)

=== Ages 4+ ===
- We Are Grateful: Otsaliheliga, illustrated by Frané Lessac (2018)
- At the Mountain's Base / ᎾᏍᎩᏃ ᎤᎾᎢ ᎡᎳᏗᏢ ᎣᏓᎸᎢ, ᎾᎢ, illustrated by Weshoyot Alvitre (2019)
- Pow Wow Day, illustrated by Madelyn Goodnight (2022)
- Being Home, illustrated by Michaela Goade (2024)
- Clack, Clack! Smack! A Cherokee Stickball Story, illustrated by Joseph Erb (2024)

=== Ages 7+ ===
- Classified: The Secret Career of Mary Golda Ross, Cherokee Aerospace Engineer, illustrated by Natasha Donovan (2021)
- We Are Still Here! Native American Truths Everyone Should Know, illustrated by Frané Lessac (2021)
- Contenders: Two Native Baseball Players, One World Series, illustrated by Arigon Starr (2023)
- Indigenous From A to Z, illustrated by Natasha Donovan (2026)

=== Middle grade ===
- Indian No More with Charlene Willing McManis (2019)
- She Persisted: Wilma Mankiller with Chelsea Clinton, illustrated by Alexandra Boiger and Gillian Flint (2022)
- Mascot with Charles Waters (2023)
- Riding the Trail: Cherokees Remember the Removal with Will Chavez (2026)

=== Anthology contributions ===
- Great Morning! Poems for School Leaders to Read Aloud, edited by Sylvia Vardell and Janet Wong (2018)
- Thanku: Poems of Gratitude, edited by Miranda Paul, illustrated by Marlena Myles (2019)
- No Voice Too Small: Fourteen Young Americans Making History, edited by Lindsay H. Metcalf, Keila V. Dawson, and Jeanette Bradley; illustrated by Bradley (2020)
- The Reluctant Storyteller with Art Coulson, illustrated by Carlin Bear Don't Walk and Roy Boney Jr. (2020)
- The Talk: Conversations About Race, Love & Truth, edited by Wade Hudson and Cheryl Willis Hudson (2020)
- Ancestor Approved: Intertribal Stories for Kids, edited by Cynthia Leitich Smith (2021)
- One Land, Many Nations: Volume 1 with Lee Francis IV, illustrated by Jesse Hummingbird (2021)
- Wonderful Women of the World, edited by Laurie Halse Anderson (2021)
- No World Too Big: Young People Fighting for Global Climate Change, edited by Lindsay H. Metcalf, Keila V. Dawson, and Jeanette Bradley; illustrated by Bradley (2023)
- Banned Together: Our Fight for Readers’ Rights, edited by Ashley Hope Pérez and illustrated by Debbie Fong (2025)
