= Monica Kulling =

Canadian children's author

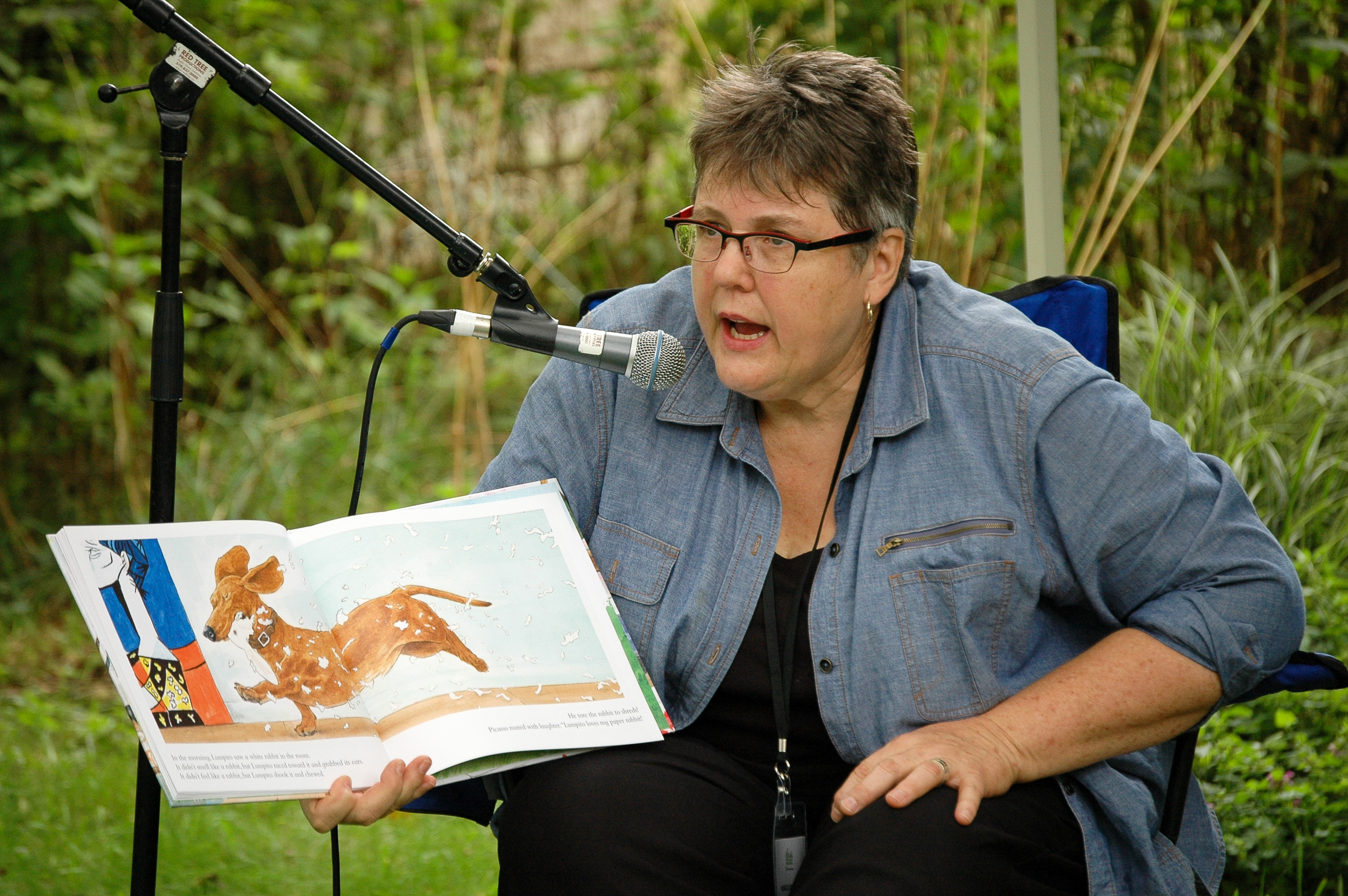
- Kulling at the Eden Mills Writers' Festival in 2013
- Born: Vancouver, British Columbia
- Education: University of Victoria
- Occupation: Author

Monica Kulling (born in Vancouver, British Columbia) is a Canadian writer of children's books based in Toronto, Ontario.

== Career ==
Kulling completed her Bachelor of Arts in creative writing from the University of Victoria. She has received the North Dakota Library Association 2016 Flicker Tale Children's Book Award in the non-fiction category.

== Bibliography ==
- The Tweedles Go Electric (Groundwood Books, 2014)
- Lumpito and the Painter from Spain (2013)
- Spic-and-Span!: Lillian Gilbreth's Wonder Kitchen
- Escape North! The Story of Harriet Tubman
- In the Bag!: Margaret Knight Wraps It Up
- On Our Way to Oyster Bay: Mother Jones and Her March for Children's Rights
- All Aboard!: Elijah McCoy's Steam Engine
- Nikola Tesla Takes Charge (Tundra, 2016)
- Happy Birthday, Alice Babette (Groundwood Books, 2016)
- To the Rescue! Garret Morgan Underground (Tundra, 2016)
- Mary Anning's Curosity (Groundwood Books, 2017)
