= Joseph A. Dandurand =

Canadian poet, playwright, and archaeologist

Joseph A. Dandurand is a Canadian poet, playwright, and archaeologist from Kwantlen First Nation in British Columbia.

Dandurand received a Diploma in Performing Arts from Algonquin College and studied Theatre and Direction at the University of Ottawa. His produced plays include Shake, Crackers and Soup (1994), No Totem for My Story (1995), Where Two Rivers Meet (1995), and Please Don't Touch the Indians (1998) for the Red Path Theater in Chicago. He has also authored a radio script, St Mary's which was produced by CBC Radio in 1999. His latest play Shake, was featured at the 20th Weesageechak Begins to Dance festival of new plays in Toronto, Ontario.

His poems have appeared in numerous journals and anthologies and are collected in Upside Down Raven, I Touched the Coyote's Tongue, and burning for the dead and scratching for the poor, Looking into the eyes of my forgotten dreams, Shake, 2005, Buried, 2007, and I Want, published by Leaf Press in 2015.

He was the Indigenous Storyteller in Residence at Vancouver Public Library in 2019.

In 2022, he was the winner of the Latner Writers' Trust Poetry Prize.

== Theatre work ==
Dandurand has been a Playwright-in-Residence for the Museum of Civilization in Hull, in 1995 and for Native Earth in Toronto in 1996. Arigon Starr acted in his Wooden Indian Woman.

== Books ==
=== Plays ===
- Please Do Not Touch the Indians, Renegade Planets Publishing.
- Th'owxiya the Hungry Feast Dish, Playwrights Canada Press, 2019.

=== Poetry ===
- shake, skyuks press 2005
- looking into the eyes of my forgotten dreams, Kegedonce Press, 2000. Reprinted by Hushion House (Feb. 2004)
- Upside Down Raven
- I Touched the Coyote's Tongue
- burning for the dead and scratching for the poor
- I Want (Leaf Press, 2015)

=== Anthologies ===
- North American Indian Drama, Alexander Street Press.
- Genocide of the Mind, Marijo Moore (Editor), Thunder's Mouth Press.
- Gatherings, The En'owkin Journal of First North American Peoples
- A Retrospective of the First Decade, Volume 10, Theytus Books.
- An Anthology of Canadian Native Literature in English,
- Daniel David Moses & Terry Goldie (Editors), Oxford University Press.
- Mother Earth Perspectives: Gatherings, Vol. III, Theytus Books, Ltd.
- Unmasking the Faces of Our Divided Nations: Gatherings, Vol. II, Theytus Books, Ltd.
