= Leatherdale =

Leatherdale is a surname. Notable people with the surname include:

- David Leatherdale (born 1967), English cricketer
- Marcus Leatherdale (1952–2022), Canadian portrait photographer
- Mary Beth Leatherdale, Canadian author and storyteller
- Paul Leatherdale (born 1958), British sports shooter
