= Under the Volcano (2021 film) =

- Poster
- Directed by: Gracie Otto
- Written by: Cody Greenwood; Gracie Otto; Ian Shadwell
- Produced by: Cody Greenwood
- Cinematography: Hugh Miller
- Edited by: Karen Johnson
- Music by: Piers Burbrook de Vere
- Production company: Rush Films
- Distributed by: Universal Home Entertainment
- Release date: 19 March 2021 (SXSW)
- Running time: 90 minutes
- Country: United States
- Language: English

Under the Volcano is a 2021 music documentary film by Australian filmmaker Gracie Otto. Centered on a 1980s recording studio on the Caribbean island of Montserrat, the film features renowned 1970s–80s musicians such as Sting, Nick Rhodes, Jimmy Buffett in his final film, Verdine White, Tony Iommi and Stewart Copeland.

The film premiered at the South by Southwest (SXSW) festival at Austin, Texas, on 19 March 2021, also being screened at several other festivals in 2021.

== Synopsis ==
The film chronicles a decade of music by AIR Montserrat, which was an important recording studio of 1980s pop music on the West Indian island of Montserrat, built by Beatles producer George Martin in 1979. As a custom-built state-of-the-art recording studio, it became known for such recordings as the albums Brothers in Arms (Dire Straits), Ghost in the Machine and Synchronicity (The Police), Steel Wheels (The Rolling Stones), and the single "I'm Still Standing" (Elton John).

The studio was destroyed by Hurricane Hugo on 17 September 1989, and some of the filming took place among the ruins.

== Cast ==
As themselves:

- Sting
- Nick Rhodes
- Jimmy Buffett
- Verdine White
- Tony Iommi
- Stewart Copeland
- Mark Knopfler
- Andy Summers
- Midge Ure
- Davey Johnstone
- Nigel Olsson

== Production ==
Producer Cody Greenwood, the daughter of artist and children’s book author Frané Lessac, was inspired by her family's frequent visits to Montserrat during the 1990s and 2000s. She chose Gracie Otto as director based on her 2013 film The Last Impresario.

Special permission had to be obtained to film among the ruins, due to the dangers of doing so.

== Release ==
The film was selected for many festivals, before its release on streaming platforms in the UK on 26 July, US 17 August and in Australia on September 1, 2021. The festivals (all 2021) include:

- SXSW (premiere, 19 March 2021)
- Boulder International Film Festival (27 June 2021, at Chautauqua Auditorium)
- Docaviv, the Tel Aviv International Documentary Film Festival (2 July 2021, Israel)
- Melbourne International Film Festival (15 August 2021, Australian premiere)
- Martha's Vineyard Film Festival (Massachusetts, US)
- CinefestOZ (Australia)
- Doc Edge (New Zealand)
- Beat Film Festival (Russia)

== Reception ==
On review aggregator website Rotten Tomatoes the film has an approval rating of 100% based on 15 critics, with an average rating of 8/10.

Chris Willman of Variety called it "a travelogue", and later added "The doc[umentary] will be catnip to the class of record nerds who care about which great records came out of which bygone studios... and this one certainly offers better scenery than, say, the Van Nuys-set Sound City".

Following its premiere at SXSW, Shane Pfender of The Austin Chronicle wrote "Instead of allowing the viewer to come to their own conclusions, this feel-good rock documentary hypnotizes its viewers with the endlessly repeated sentiment of how amazing the Seventies were".
