= I See Me (disambiguation) =

"I See Me" is a 2005 song by Travis Tritt.

I See Me may also refer to:

- "I See Me" (BoA song), a 2011 song by BoA
- I See Me, a 2010 children's book by Margaret Manuel
- I See Me!, a publishing company acquired by McEvoy Group in 2014

== See also ==
- "I See Me, I.C.U."
