= Mary Beth Leatherdale =

Canadian author and storyteller

- Notable works: #NotYourPrincess
- Notable awards: Norma Fleck Award (2018); American Indian Youth Literature Award (2022)

Website
- marybethleatherdale.com

Mary Beth Leatherdale is a Canadian author and storyteller.

== Early life and education ==
Leatherdale grew up in Ridgetown.

Leatherdale received a bachelor's degree in visual arts from the University of Western Ontario, followed by a Master of Education from the Ontario Institute of Studies in Education at the University of Toronto.

== Career ==
In 2018, Leatherdale was the International Board on Books for Young People Canada president, during which time she co-chaired a project to increase the number of children's books by Indigenous authors held in Canadian libraries.

== Awards and honors ==
Dreaming in Indian is a 2015 White Ravens book.

#NotYourPrincess is a Amelia Bloomer Book. Kirkus Reviews and Quill & Quire included it on their list of the best books of 2017.

Chicago Public Library included Stormy Seas on their "Best Informational Books for Older Readers of 2017" list. Booklist included it on their 2017 "Booklist Editors' Choice: Books for Youth" list, as well as their 2018 "Top 10 Diverse Nonfiction for Older and Middle Readers" list. Stormy Seas is a 2018 White Ravens book.

Terry Fox and Me is a Junior Library Guild book. CBC Books named it one of the top 20 picture books of 2020. Bank Street College of Education included it on their 2021 list of the best books published for children ages five to nine. Terry Fox and Me was on the CBC Bestseller List for nine weeks.

Awards for Leatherdale's writing
Year	Title	Award	Result	Ref.
2014	Dreaming in Indian	Foreword INDIES Award for Young Adult Nonfiction (Children's)	Silver	
2015-16	Dreaming in Indian	First Nation Communities Read	Shortlist	
2016	Dreaming in Indian	American Indian Youth Literature Award for Middle Grade Book	Honor	
2017	#NotYourPrincess	Foreword INDIES Award for Young Adult Nonfiction (Children's)	Bronze	
2017	Stormy Seas	Foreword INDIES Award for Juvenile Nonfiction (Children's)	Finalist	
2018	#NotYourPrincess	Norma Fleck Award for Canadian Children's Non-Fiction	Winner	
2018	#NotYourPrincess	YALSA Award for Excellence in Nonfiction	Finalist	
2018	Stormy Seas	Silver Birch Award for Nonfiction	Winner	
2021	Stormy Seas	Rebecca Caudill Young Readers' Book Award	Nominee	
2021	Terry Fox and Me	Golden Kite Award for Nonfiction for Younger Readers	Finalist	
2021	Terry Fox and Me	Silver Birch Express Award	Finalist	
2022	#NotYourPrincess	American Indian Youth Literature Award for Best Young Adult Book	Winner	

== Publications ==
=== Children's books ===
- Celebrate Canada: Bats and Bikes. Pearson Canada. 2017. ISBN 9780134765945.
- Celebrate Canada: Lighthouses. Pearson Canada. 2017. ISBN 9780134767031.
- Stormy Seas: Stories of Young Boat Refugees. Illus. by Eleanor Shakespeare. Annick Press. 2017. ISBN 9781554518951.
- Terry Fox and Me. Illus. by Milan Pavlović. Tundra Books. 2020. ISBN 9780735267688.
- Andreescu, Bianca (2022). Bibi's Got Game. Illus. by Chelsea O'Byrne. Tundra Books. ISBN 9780735270558.

=== Anthologies edited ===
- Charleyboy, Lisa, ed. (2014). Dreaming in Indian: Contemporary Native American Voices. Annick Press. ISBN 978-1-55451-687-2.
- Charleyboy, Lisa, ed. (2017). #Notyourprincess: Voices of Native American Women. Annick Press. ISBN 978-1-55451-957-6.
- Charleyboy, Lisa, ed. (2015). Urban Tribes: Native Americans in the City. Annick Press. ISBN 978-1-55451-751-0.
