= Christine Day (disambiguation) =

Christine Day is a Jamaican sprinter.

Christine Day may also refer to:

- Christine M. Day (born 1962), Canadian retail executive
- Christine Day (author), American author
