= Monica Gunning =

American poet

Monica Gunning (born 1930) is a Jamaican American children's book author and poet. Her work deals with both the Caribbean of her childhood and the immigrant experience.

== Biography ==
Gunning was born in Jamaica in 1930. She moved to New York City at age 18. There, she studied at the City College of New York.

Her first book of poetry for children, Not a Copper Penny in Me House: Poems from the Caribbean, was published in 1993, with illustrations by Frané Lessac. The anthology of 15 poems about Jamaican culture received a commendation from the Américas Awards for children's and young adult literature.

Subsequent works included Under the Breadfruit Tree: Island Poems (1998) and America, My New Home (2004). Gunning brings her own experience as both a child in Jamaica and a young immigrant to the United States to her work.

Her 2004 book about a girl and her mother dealing with homelessness, A Shelter in Our Car, was developed in collaboration with the Homeless Children's Network in San Francisco. It received a Skipping Stones Honor Award in 2005 and an honorable mention from the Gustavus Myers Outstanding Book Awards in 2004.

A Shelter in Our Car was adapted into a children's musical by the New York theater company Making Books Sing in 2007.

Gunning also holds a master's in education from Mount St. Mary's College in Los Angeles and has studied at the University of Guadalajara. She had a long career as an elementary school educator, working for many years as a bilingual teacher in Los Angeles and teaching English as a second language. She was also a training teacher at the University of Southern California and the University of California, Los Angeles.

== Selected works ==
- Not a Copper Penny in Me House (1993)
- Under the Breadfruit Tree (1998)
- America, My New Home (2004)
- A Shelter in Our Car (2004)
