= Jo Jo Makoons =

Book series by Dawn Quigley

- First edition cover of Jo Jo Makoons: The Used-to-be Best Friend
- Author: Dawn Quigley
- Illustrator: Tara Audibert
- Language: English
- Series: Jo Jo Makoons
- Genre: Children's literature
- Publisher: Heartdrum
- Publication date: May 11, 2021
- Media type: Print
- Followed by: Fancy Pants

Jo Jo Makoons is a middle-grade chapter book series, written by Dawn Quigley, illustrated by Tara Audibert, and was first published on May 11, 2021 by Heartdrum. The series centers Jo Jo Makoons Azure, an Ojibwe girl. As of 2026, it consists of five books: The Use-To-Be Best Friend (2021), Fancy Pants (2022), Snow Day (2023), Rule School (2024), and The Super-Scary Sleepover (2025).

== Reception ==
Jo Jo Makoons: The Use-To-Be Best Friend received starred reviews from The Horn Book, Shelf Awareness, Publishers Weekly, School Library Journal, and Kirkus, as well as positive reviews from Quill & Quire, CBC Books, Book Page, and Booklist.

The book was also selected by the Junior Library Guild.

The series has been shortlisted for American Indian Youth Literature Award for Best Middle School Book multiple times; Fancy Pants and Snow Day were both finalists for the 2024 edition of the award, while The Super-Scary Sleepover was a finalist in 2026.
