= Rain Is Not My Indian Name =

2001 novel by Cynthia Leitich Smith

- Cover of Rain Is Not My Indian Name
- Author: Cynthia Leitich Smith
- Cover artist: Paperback edition cover by Natasha Donovan; cover design by David DeWitt
- Language: English
- Genre: Young adult literature
- Publisher: Heartdrum
- Publication date: June 19, 2001
- Media type: Print

Rain Is Not My Indian Name is a middle-grade / young adult novel written by Cynthia Leitich Smith, illustrated by Lori Earley, and published June 19, 2001 by Heartdrum.

== Reception ==
Rain is Not My Indian Name received positive reviews from Kirkus Reviews, The Bulletin of the Center for Children's Books, Booklist, Publishers Weekly, American Indians in Children's Literature, and School Library Journal.

The book also received the following accolades:

- Oklahoma Book Award finalist
- National Book Festival featured title
- Texas Book Festival featured title
- Dishchii’Bikoh High School Reader Award
- “You Gotta Read This Book” Club, St. Petersburg Times
- "Great Books for Girls" by Kathleen Odean featured title (Ballantine, 2002)
- Book of the Month, Red Tales, Aboriginal Voices Radio
- "The Children's Literature Lover's Book" by Joanna Sullivan featured title (Jossey-Bass, 2003)
- "Does Anybody Else Look Like Me? A Parent's Guide to Raising Multifacial Children" by Donna Jackson Nakazawa recommended title (Da Capo Press, 2004)
- "Seven Choices: Finding Daylight After Loss Shatters Your World" by Elizabeth Harper Neeld recommended title (Warner Books, 2003)
- Recommended Native Literature for Youth Reading Circles from American Experience: “We Shall Remain,” PBS, April 2009
