= Daniella Mestyanek Young =

Scholar of cults

Daniella Mestyanek Young is an author, cult survivor, former intelligence officer for the US army, and scholar of group dynamics. She produces videos online under the name Knitting Cult Lady.

Young is a graduate of University of Texas at Dallas in Literary Studies and received an MA in Organizational Psychology from Harvard University. She has received the President's Volunteer Service Award from Barack Obama.

She has written four books, Uncultured, The Culting of America, Culty Knitting Patterns, and Unculture Yourself. Much of her work involves the study of cults, helping people identify them, and healing after people chose to leave.

Young often collaborates with authors, video makers, and podcasters. The Culting of America is co-authored by Amy Reed.

== Early life ==
Young was born into The Family International, a child rape cult. She grew up inside the cult compound in Brazil. When she was able to, she left and moved to Texas.

== Views ==
Young is of the opinion that trumpism and QAnon are cults of personality. She has expressed that leaving cults is usually devastatingly difficult, both for the person leaving and people who love them trying to help them leave. Young also encourages empathy, continued connection, and question asking as ways to offer people stuck in cults a way out. Young has been highly critical of the largely discredited deprogramming and the softer exit counseling, arguing that until someone is ready to leave a high-control group, little can be done to make them leave.
