= Holler Loudly =

2010 children's book by Cynthia Leitich Smith

Holler Loudly is a children's picture book written by Cynthia Leitich Smith, illustrated by Barry Gott, and published November 11, 2010 by Dutton Juvenile.

== Reception ==
Holler Loudly received a positive review from The Bulletin of the Center for Children's Books. The book also received the following accolades:

- Texas Book Festival featured title (2010)
- Dolly Parton's Imagination Library selection
- Writers’ League of Texas Children's Book Award finalist
