= Frané Lessac =

U.S born author, illustrator and painter (born 1954)

- Born: Jersey City, New Jersey
- Education: The New School for Social Research, USC and UCLA
- Occupations: Artist & Illustrator
- Known for: Painting and Illustrating books
- Spouse: Mark Greenwood
- Website: www.franelessac.com

Frané Lessac is a U.S.-born author, illustrator and painter who lives in Western Australia. She has published many children's books and won numerous awards for her illustrations.

== Early life ==
Lessac grew up in Cliffside Park, New Jersey, a small town outside New York City. As a child, she spent many weekends in museums and galleries. At the age of 18 she moved to Malibu, California, to study ethnographic film at the University of Southern California and UCLA. She worked at many jobs to finance her studies, including projectionist at the local cinema.

Lessac moved to the Caribbean island of Montserrat in 1979, where she began her career as a painter. Inspired by the beauty of the island, she concentrated on painting the old West Indies architecture and its people.

In 1983 Lessac left Montserrat and moved to London, where she began to exhibit regularly and published her first book, My Little Island (1984), which was illustrated with her paintings of Montserrat and was her "love letter" to the island.

== Career ==
After My Little Island, Lessac went on to publish a number of children's books, initially in the U.K, the U.S and later in the state of Western Australia, where she relocated with her husband, author and musician Mark Greenwood.

In 1989 she created the illustration for the cover of the fund-raising album After The Hurricane – Songs For Montserrat.

In 2002 Lessac founded a Western Australian Branch of the Society of Children's Book Writers and Illustrators, and she has served on the executive committee of the Australian Society of Authors.

== Recognition ==
For her contribution to children's literature in Western Australia, Lessac was awarded the 2010 Muriel Barwell Award by the Children's Book Council of Australia WA Branch.

Her first book, My Little Island, became a feature book on the popular U.S television program Reading Rainbow.

In 2002 Lessac won a Western Australian Premier's Book Award for The Legend of Moondyne Joe. Simpson and his Donkey was nominated as an Honour book in the 2009 Children's Book of the Year Award: Eve Pownall Award for Information Books. Both books were written by her husband and frequent collaborator, Mark Greenwood.

Lessac's picture books with Traci Sorell, We Are Grateful and We Are Still Here, both received starred Kirkus reviews upon release, and both were named in Kirkus Best Books of the year lists. We Are Grateful won the 2019 Boston Globe-Horn Book Picture Book Honor Award and a 2020 American Indian Youth Literature Award. It also received an Honor in both the 2019 Robert F. Silbert Informational Book Medal and the 2019 National Council of Teachers of English Orbis Pictus Awards. We Are Still Here received a 2022 American Indian Youth Literature Award, the International Literacy Association's 2022 Social Justice Literature Award, and an Honor in the 2022 Robert F Silbert Informational Book Medal. It was also named in the National Centre for the Social Studies' 2022 list of Notable Trade Books for Young People.

Lessac's book A is for Australian Reefs was shortlisted in the 2023 CBCA Eve Pownall Award for Information Books. Lessac and Greenwood's book Our Country: Where History Happened won an Honour Book in the same category in 2024; it was also shortlisted in the WA Premier's Book Awards and the NSW Premier's History Awards the same year.

== Personal life and family ==
Lessac is married to Mark Greenwood, also an author of children's books, and they are parents to film producer Cody Greenwood.

Cody's most recent film, Under the Volcano, a documentary about the AIR Montserrat recording studios, arose from memories of the family's frequent visits to Montserrat as she was growing up in the 1990s and 2000s. Lessac returned to Montserrat in August 2019, while Cody was filming, and again in 2024.

== Selected works ==
=== As illustrator ===
- The Dragon of Redonda by Jan Jackson (1986)
- The Chalk Doll by Charlotte Pomerantz (1989)
- The Bird Who Was An Elephant by Aleph Kamal (1989)
- The Turtle and The Island by Barbra Ker Wilson (1990)
- Nine O'Clock Lullaby by Marilyn Singer (1990)
- Caribbean Carnival songs by Irving Burgie (1992)
- The Fire Children retold by Eric Maddern (1993)
- Little Gray One by Jan Wahl (1993)
- Not A Copper Penny by Monica Gunning (1993)
- Magic Boomerang by Mark Greenwood (1994)
- Wonderful Towers of Watts by Patricia Zelver (1994)
- Outback Adventure by Mark Greenwood (1994)
- The Distant Talking Drum by Isaac Olaleye (1994)
- Good Rhymes Good Times by Lee Bennett Hopkins (1995)
- Our Big Island by Mark Greenwood (1995)
- O Christmas Tree! by Vashanti Rahaman (1996)
- Queen Esther Saves Her People by Rita Gelman (1998)
- On the Same Day in March by Marilyn Singer (2000)
- The Legend of Moondyne Joe by Mark Greenwood & Frané Lessac (2002)
- Capital! Washington D-C from A-Z by Laura Melmed (2003)
- Maui and the Big Fish by Barbra Ker Wilson (2003)
- New York- The Big Apple from A-Z by Laura Melmed (2005)
- Monday on the Mississippi by Marilyn Singer (2005)
- The Day of the Elephant by Barbra Ker Wilson (2005)
- Simpson and his Donkey by Mark Greenwood & Frané Lessac (2008)
- Clouds by Anne Rockwell (2008)
- Heart of Texas by Laura Melmed (2009)
- Ned Kelly and the Green Sash by Mark Greenwood & Frané Lessac (2010)
- The Greatest Liar on Earth by Mark Greenwood & Frané Lessac (2012)
- The Drummer Boy of John John by Mark Greenwood & Frané Lessac (2012)
- The Book Boat's In by Cynthia Cotten & Frané Lessac (2013)
- Midnight by Mark Greenwood & Frané Lessac (2014)
- The Mayflower by Mark Greenwood & Frané Lessac (2014)
- Pattan's Pumpkin by Chitra Soundar & Frané Lessac (2016)
- We Are Grateful: Otsaliheliga by Traci Sorell & Frané Lessac (2018)
- We Are Still Here by Traci Sorell & Frané Lessac (2021)
- Ancient Wonders by Mark Greenwood & Frané Lessac (2022)
- Our Country: Where History Happened by Mark Greenwood & Frané Lessac (2023)
- Cattle Muster by Dianne Wolfer & Frané Lessac (2025)
- The Legend of Jessie Hickman by Mark Greenwood & Frané Lessac (2025)

=== Author and illustrator ===
- My Little Island (1984)
- Caribbean Canvas (1987)
- Caribbean Alphabet (1989)
- Camp Granada (2003)
- Island Counting 1-2-3 (2005)
- A Is for Australia (2015)
- A is for Australian Animals (2017)
- Under the Southern Cross (2018)
- Australian Baby Animals (2019)
- Under the Milky Way (2019)
- Australia Under the Sea 1, 2, 3 (2020)
- A is for Australian Reefs (2022)
- The Big Book of Australian Nursery Rhymes (2024)
- The Little Book of Australian Nursery Rhymes (2025)
- Meet Me at the Big Galah (2026)
