= Our Stories, Our Voices =

2018 anthology

- First edition book cover
- Editor: Amy Reed
- Publisher: Simon & Schuster Books for Young Readers
- Publication date: August 14, 2018
- ISBN: 9781534409019

Our Stories, Our Voices: 21 YA Authors Get Real About Injustice, Empowerment, and Growing Up Female in America is a 2018 short story, non-fiction anthology edited by American author Amy Reed. The essays, which used the election of former president Donald Trump as a prompt, discuss topics such as abuse, coming-of-age, feminism, racism, sexual assault, social justice, and violence, often through "the lens of race, gender bias, and Islamophobia".

== Contents ==
- "My Immigrant American Dream" by Sandhya Menon
- "Her Hair Was Not of Gold" by Anna-Marie McLemore
- "Finding My Feminism" by Amy Reed
- "Unexpected Pursuits: Embracing My Indigeneity & Creativity" by Christine Day
- "Chilled Monkey Brains" by Sona Charaipotra
- "Roar" by Jay Robin Brown
- "Easter Offering" by Brandy Colbert
- 'Trumps and Trunchbulls" by Alexandra Duncan
- "Tiny Battles" by Maurene Goo
- "These Words Are Mine" by Stephanie Kuehnert
- "Fat and Loud" by Julie Murphy
- 'Myth Making: In the Wake of Hardship" by Somaiya Daud
- "Changing Constellations" by Nina LaCour
- "The One Who Defines Me" by Aisha Saeed
- "In Our Genes" by Hannah Moskowitz
- "An Accidental Activist" by Ellen Hopkins
- "Dreams Deferred and Other Explosions" by Ilene (I.W.) Gregorio
- "Not Like the Other Girls" by Martha Brockenbrough
- "Is Something Bothering You?" by Jenny Torres Sanchez
- "What I've Learned about Silence" by Amber Smith
- "Black Girl, Becoming" by Tracy Deonn

== Reception ==
On behalf of Shelf Awareness, Nell Beram made clear the book's intended audience, indicating that those who did not feel lost after the results of the 2016 presidential election were announced "will not likely find common ground with the contributors"; however, those who felt a loss "will find comfort" within the book's essays.

Kate Quealy-Gainer, writing for The Bulletin of the Center for Children's Books, indicated that the book shows "a clear effort at intersectionality, with a diverse set of women reflecting on elements beyond gender that informed their path to adulthood". Quealy-Gainer further noted that "although many of the essays end with a call to action, there's only one page of resources offered in the back to guide young readers to social justice activism". As such, she concluded that the essays "serve more as reflective pieces for readers interested in the topic or as discussion starters".

Kirkus Reviews considered the essay "successful in showcasing a wide array of topics, although some entries end with abrupt or seemingly anecdotal conclusions". They noted that the book's "fundamental message is one of growth and hope" and concluded that "readers of all genders can benefit" from the book's "advice and perspectives".

Publishers Weekly thought that, "collectively, the contributors provide a broad-ranging, ultimately galvanizing perspective on living as girls and women in today’s America".
