= At the Mountain's Base =

2019 children's book by Traci Sorell

- Cover of At the Mountain's Base
- Author: Traci Sorell
- Cover artist: Weshoyot Alvitre
- Language: English / Cherokee
- Genre: Historical fiction, Picture book
- Publisher: Kokila
- Publication date: September 17th 2019
- Publication place: United States
- Media type: Print (hardcover, paperback)
- Pages: 26
- ISBN: 978-0-73-523060-6

At the Mountain's Base is a children's book written by Traci Sorell, illustrated by Weshoyot Alvitre, and published September 17, 2019 by Kokila. The book was also published in Cherokee under the title ᎾᏍᎩᏃ ᎤᎾᎢ ᎡᎳᏗᏢ ᎣᏓᎸᎢ, ᎾᎢ.

== Reception ==
At the Mountain's Base received starred reviews from School Library Journal, Booklist, and Shelf Awareness, as well as positive reviews from Publishers Weekly, American Indians in Children's Literature, and Kirkus.

Bank Street College of Education named At the Mountain's Base one of the best children's books of 2020.

Awards and honors for At the Mountain's Base
Year	Award/Honor	Result	Ref.
2020	American Indian Youth Literature Award	Honor	
2020	Notable Books for a Global Society Award List	Selection	
2020	Notable Children's Books	Selection	
2020	Notable Social Studies Trade Books for Young People	Selection	
2020	Rise: A Feminist Book Project	Top 10	
2020	Wisconsin State Reading Association Recommendation List	Selection	
2022	ALA Notable Children's Recordings	Selection	
