= Meet Christopher: An Osage Indian Boy from Oklahoma =

- Author: Genevieve Simermeyer
- Illustrator: Katherine Fogden
- Language: English
- Series: My World: Young Native Americans Today
- Publisher: Council Oak Books
- Publication date: October 1, 2008
- Publication place: United States
- Pages: 48
- ISBN: 978-1571782175
- Preceded by: Meet Lydia: A Native Girl from Southeast Alaska

Meet Christopher: An Osage Indian Boy from Oklahoma is a 2008 book by Genevieve Simermeyer for middle school students.

The book tells the story of Christopher Cote who attends the annual In-lon-shka gathering where he and his family celebrate their Osage heritage by dancing, eating, and wearing traditional garments. Christopher also engages in year-round activities to help keep his people's culture vibrant, such as studying the Osage language at a weekly class at his local public library.

Meet Christopher is the fourth book in the National Museum of the American Indian's My World: Young Native Americans Today series. Illustrated with photographs by Katherine Fogden, it won the 2010 American Indian Youth Literature Award for Best Middle School Book. As of 2006, the author, Genevieve Simermeyer, was the school programs manager for the museum.
