= Lurline Wailana McGregor =

American writer and filmmaker

Lurline Wailana McGregor is a writer, filmmaker, administrator and paddler from Hawaii.

McGregor's ancestors were Hawaiian, Chinese, and Scottish. She was named after the ocean liner Lurline, where her parents first met.

In 1986 McGregor joined the staff of Senator Daniel Inouye where she focused on Native American issues.

McGregor has been active in sailing and paddling since the 1990s. She filmed a documentary about her journey aboard the Hōkūleʻa, a double hulled voyaging canoe. The 58 minute film was shown at the 2001 Newport Beach Film Festival.

Later she was CEO and president of 'Ōlelo Community Television, a non-profit access-provider in O'ahu, where she helped establish NATV 53, a channel for native Hawaiian content.

In 2008 she authored Between the Deep Blue Sea and Me. The hopeful novel was inspired by the New Zealand film Whale Rider and tells of a Hawaiian-born anthropologist forced to choose between her career on the mainland and her ancestral responsibilities. It deals with themes of activism, politics, and the Hawaiian sovereignty movement. Despite the adult protagonist, the novel appeals to young adult readers and won the 2010 American Indian Youth Literature Award for Best Young Adult Book.
