= Apple: Skin to the Core =

2020 poetic memoir for young adults by Eric Gansworth

Apple (Skin to the Core)
- Author: Eric Gansworth
- Cover artist: Filip Peraić
- Language: English
- Subject: Native Americans, Onondaga people, Tuscarora Nation, Pop music, Rock and roll, Family
- Genre: Memoir, young adult literature, novel in verse, coming of age novel
- Publisher: Levine Querido/Scholastic Corporation
- Publication date: October 6, 2020
- Publication place: United States
- Media type: Print (hardcover and paperback), Audiobook, E-book
- Pages: 352
- Awards: American Indian Youth Literature Award, Michael L. Printz Award honor
- ISBN: 9781646140138 Hardcover edition
- OCLC: 1198075227

Apple (Skin to the Core) is a poetic memoir for young adults, written by Eric Gansworth and published October 6, 2020 by Levine Querido. In this book, Gansworth talks about his life as an Onondaga individual, living amongst Tuscaroras, and the impact of residential schooling. As he covers these topics, he discusses common slurs against Indigenous Americans, including the term "apple," which refers to someone who is "red on the outside, white on the inside," that is, who looks Indigenous but acts white.

On top of winning the American Indian Youth Literature Award for Young Adult, Apple was longlisted for the National Book Award for Young People's Literature and was a Michael L. Printz Award honor book.

== Reception ==
Apple: Skin to the Core is a Junior Library Guild book and was generally well-received, including starred reviews from Booklist and Shelf Awareness.

Kirkus Reviews called the book "[a] rare and special read," while School Library Journal called it "bittersweet but ultimately inspiring." Jen Forbus, writing for Shelf Awareness, noted, "With dramatic textual imagery, nuanced storytelling and evocative illustrations, Apple is a stirring depiction of Indigenous life." Booklist's Kay Weisman, stated, "Gansworth’s art, a mix of gouache paintings, photographs, and collages (reproduced in black and white), is interspersed throughout, adding interest and detail. With language rich in metaphor, this is a timely and important work that begs for multiple readings."

The Center for the Study of Multicultural Children's Literature, NPR, Shelf Awareness, and Time named Apple one of the best books for children and young adults in 2020.

Awards and honors for Apple (Skin to the Core)
Year	Award/Honor	Category	Result	Ref.
2020	National Book Award	Young People's Literature	Longlisted	
2021	Booklist's Best Biography & Memoir for Youth	—	Selected Top 10	
2021	Michael L. Printz Award	—	Honor	
2021	YALSA Award for Excellence in Nonfiction	—	Longlisted	
2022	Amazing Audiobooks for Young Adults	—	Selected Top 10	
2022	American Indian Youth Literature Award	Young Adult	Won	
