= Jacqueline Guest =

Métis writer and activist

Jacqueline Guest CM
- Born: 1952 (age 73–74)
- Citizenship: Canadian
- Writing career
- Genre: Children's fiction
- Notable awards: American Indian Youth Literature Award (2012)
- Website: jacquelineguest.com

Jacqueline Guest CM (born 1952) is a Métis writer and activist from Alberta, Canada. Guest is a literacy advocate and a writers of books for children and young adults. In 2017, she was inducted into the Order of Canada.

== Awards and honours ==
In 2012, Guest received the Indspire Award for the Arts, which "recognize[s] Indigenous professionals and youth who demonstrate outstanding career achievement."

In 2017, she was inducted into the Order of Canada "for her contributions as a children’s book author who promotes multiculturalism, youth literacy and Indigenous culture."

Awards for Guest's writing
Year	Title	Award	Result	Ref.
2012	Outcasts of River Falls	Moonbeam Children's Book Award for Pre-Teen Fiction (Historical/Cultural)	Gold	
2012	Free Throw & Triple Threat	American Indian Youth Literature Award for Best Middle School Book	Winner	
2015	The Comic Book War	Forest of Reading Red Maple Award	Nominee	
2016	The Comic Book War	Manitoba Young Readers Choice Award	Nominee	

== Publications ==
=== Belle of Batoche series ===
- Belle of Batoche. Orca Book Publishers. 2004. ISBN 978-1-551-43297-7.
- Outcasts of River Falls. Coteau Books. 2012. ISBN 978-1-55050-480-4.

=== Historical fiction ===
- Ghost Messages. Coteau Books. 2011. ISBN 978-1-55050-458-3.
- The Comic Book War. Coteau Books. 2014. ISBN 978-1-55050-582-5.

=== Lorimer Sports Stories ===
- Hat Trick. Lorimer. 1997. ISBN 978-1-552-77563-9.
- Free Throw. Lorimer. 1999. ISBN 1-55028-664-1.
- Triple Threat. Lorimer. 1999. ISBN 1-55028-682-X.
- Rookie Season. Lorimer. 2000. ISBN 978-1-550-28725-7.
- Rink Rivals. Lorimer. 2001. ISBN 978-1-552-77565-3.
- A Goal in Sight. Lorimer. 2002. ISBN 978-1-550-28780-6.
- Soccer Star!. Lorimer. 2003. ISBN 978-1-550-28789-9.

=== PathFinders series ===
- Fire Fight. 7th Generation. 2015. ISBN 978-1-939053-11-4.

=== Sam Stellar Mystery series ===
- Death by Dinosaur. Coteau Books. 2018. ISBN 978-1-55050-943-4.

=== SideStreets books ===
- Lightning Rider. Lorimer. 2000. ISBN 978-1-550-28720-2.
- Racing Fear. Lorimer. 2004. ISBN 978-1-550-28838-4.
- Wild Ride. Lorimer. 2005. ISBN 978-1-550-28880-3.
- Dream Racer. Lorimer. 2006. ISBN 978-1-550-28942-8.
- War Games. Lorimer. 2008. ISBN 978-1-552-77036-8.

=== Other ===
- At Risk. Lorimer. 2004. ISBN 1-55028-846-6.
- Secret Signs. Orca Book Publishers. 2006. ISBN 978-1-551-43599-2.
