= Heartdrum =

HarperCollins imprint of children's books

- Parent company: HarperCollins
- Status: Active
- Country of origin: United States
- Headquarters location: New York City
- Fiction genres: Children; Young adult
- Official website: harpercollins.com

Heartdrum is a publishing imprint of HarperCollins Publishers specializing in children’s and young adult books by Indigenous authors and illustrators, centering contemporary Native experiences, identities, and perspectives. Established to amplify Native voices in youth literature, Heartdrum offers picture books, chapter books, middle-grade novels, and YA titles that celebrate the diversity and resilience of Indigenous peoples.

== History ==
Heartdrum was announced in November 2019 and formally launched in winter 2021 as part of HarperCollins Children’s Books. The imprint was created in partnership with We Need Diverse Books (WNDB) to expand representation of Indigenous stories in children’s and YA publishing. Its name and logo honor the connection between the drumbeat and the heartbeat of Native community, reflecting cultural continuity and vibrancy.

=== Mission ===
Heartdrum’s mission is to publish innovative, heartfelt, and unexpected stories for young readers that are informed by lived Indigenous experience and centered on young Native protagonists. It seeks works in multiple formats including picture books, realistic and genre fiction, graphic novels, and middle grade and YA novels.

=== Founding Author-Curator ===
Cynthia Leitich Smith (born 1967) is a New York Times bestselling author and the author-curator of the Heartdrum imprint. She is an enrolled member of the Muscogee (Creek) Nation and has had a longstanding career in children’s and YA literature. Smith’s own body of writing spans picture books, middle-grade novels, YA fiction, and anthologies. In her role with Heartdrum, Smith curates and advocates for Indigenous authors and illustrators, helping to build an imprint that prioritizes contemporary Native storytelling and diverse youthful perspectives.

== Notable Achievements ==
Over its first years, Heartdrum titles have collectively received numerous starred reviews, national honors, and inclusion on best-of lists from major trade publications and library associations. Notable recognitions include:

- Michael L. Printz Award (2026) for Legendary Frybread Drive-In: Intertribal Stories (anthology), also winning the American Indian Youth Literature Award for Best YA Book and an Odyssey Honor for its audiobook.

Heartdrum has published several award-winning children's books.

- Rain Is Not My Indian Name by Cynthia Leitich Smith (February 2021)
- Jo Jo Makoons series by Dawn Quigley, illustrated by Tara Audibert (May 2021)
- The Summer of Bitter and Sweet by Jen Ferguson (May 2022)

== See also ==
- HarperCollins
- Books in the United States
- List of writers from peoples indigenous to the Americas
