= Natasha Donovan =

Métis Canadian illustrator

- Education: University of British Columbia
- Occupation: Illustrator

Natasha Donovan is a Métis Canadian illustrator who focuses on comics and children's illustration. She is a member of the Métis Nation of British Columbia.

== Life and education ==
Though Donovan's "Métis family are the Delarondes and the Morins from Meadow Lake, Saskatchewan," she spent the majority of her life in Vancouver, British Columbia. She is a member of the Métis Nation of British Columbia.

Donovan received a Bachelor of Arts in Anthropology from the University of British Columbia.

Donovan currently lives in Deming, Washington with her partner, Sky, and their dog, Luna.

== Career ==
Donovan taught herself how to draw, and before beginning her career in illustration, she worked in academia and magazine publishing at the University of Victoria.

=== Awards and honors ===
Awards and honors for books Donovan illustrated
| Year | Title | Award/Honor | Result | Ref. |
|---|---|---|---|---|
| 2019 | Surviving the City | Indigenous Voices Award for Works in an Alternative Format | Winner | |
| 2020 | The Grizzly Mother | American Indian Youth Literature Award for Best Middle School Book | Honor | |
| 2020 | Surviving the City | American Indian Youth Literature Award for Best Young Adult Book | Honor | |
| 2020 | Surviving the City | Manitoba Young Readers' Choice Award for Northern Lights | Nominee | |
| 2021 | From the Roots Up | Indigenous Voices Award for Published Graphic Novels, Comics, and Illustrated Books in any Language | Finalist | |
| 2022 | Borders | Walter Dean Myers Award for Young Readers category | Honor | |
| 2022 | Classified | American Indian Youth Literature Award for Best Picture Book | Honor | |
| 2022 | From the Roots Up | Manitoba Young Readers' Choice Award for Northern Lights | Nominee | |

=== Publications ===
- Surviving the City, written by Tasha Spillett (2019)
- Go Dance!, written by Cinnamon Spear (2020)
- Borders, written by Thomas King (2021)
- Classified: The Secret Career of Mary Golda Ross, Cherokee Aerospace Engineer, written by Traci Sorell (2021)
- The Global Ocean, written by Rochelle Strauss (2022)
- A River's Gifts: The Mighty Elwha River Reborn by Patricia Newman (2022)

==== Mothers of Xsan series ====
- The Sockeye Mother, written by Hetxw'ms Gyetxw (Brett D. Huson) (2018)
- The Grizzly Mother, written by Hetxw'ms Gyetxw (Brett D. Huson) (2019)
- The Eagle Mother, written by Hetxw'ms Gyetxw (Brett D. Huson) (2020)
- The Frog Mother, written by Hetxw'ms Gyetxw (Brett D. Huson) (2021)
- The Raven Mother, written by Hetxw'ms Gyetxw (Brett D. Huson) (2022)

==== Surviving the City series ====
- Surviving the City, written by Tasha Spillett (2019)
- From the Roots Up, written by Tasha Spillett (2020)
- We Are The Medicine, written by Tasha Spillett (2024)

==== Anthology contributions ====
- The Other Side: An Anthology of Queer Paranormal Romance, edited by Melanie Gillman and Kori Michele Handwerker (2016)
- This Place: 150 Years Retold (2019)
- Marvel's Voices: Heritage (2022)
