= The Summer of Bitter and Sweet =

Novel by Jen Ferguson

- Author: Jen Ferguson
- Language: English
- Genre: Young adult fiction
- Set in: Canadian Prairies
- Published: May 10, 2022
- Publisher: Heartdrum
- Publication place: Canada
- Media type: Print: Hardcover Digital: Audiobook, eBook
- Pages: 384
- Award: Governor General’s Literary Award
- ISBN: 9780063086166
- Website: jenfergusonwrites.com

The Summer of Bitter and Sweet is a novel written by Canadian author Jen Ferguson, and published in 2022 by Heartdrum. It won the 2022 Governor General's Literary Award for young people's literature — text. It is a coming of age story that explores anger, secrets, and many aspects of what makes up a person.

== Synopsis ==
The Summer of Bitter and Sweet is about Lou, a Métis girl living with family and spending time with friends on the Canadian prairies, who plans on working at her uncle's ice cream shack during the summer. It is a coming of age story about anger, secrets, and all the facets of what makes up a person, as well as a tenderness that can coexist within a painful reality.

== Awards ==
The Summer of Bitter and Sweet won the Governor General's Award for young people's literature – text at the 2022 Governor General's Awards. The book was selected by a three-person peer assessment committee, and the award was granted by the Canada Council for the Arts, which is normally presented by the Governor General of Canada at a ceremony held at Rideau Hall.

== Reception ==
The Summer of Bitter and Sweet was well received by critics and peers, winning the Governor General's Award and receiving starred reviews from Booklist, BookPage, Kirkus Reviews, and School Library Journal.

Booklist's Jeanne Fredriksen writes, "Ferguson's frank and powerful debut opens readers’ eyes to the multiplicity of daily traumas faced by people of color, especially Indigenous women and girls." She further highlights that the novel's main character "Lou is complex, smart, and honest, and a narrator readers will trust, love, and learn from as she works to repair friendships and gain security for her treasured family."

Kirkus Reviews called the novel "heart-rending and healing; a winning blend that will leave readers satisfied." Tamara Saarinen writes in the School Library Journal, "The honesty and complexity of this book make it a gripping read." At the BookPage, Sarah Welch stated, "Readers will appreciate that Lou's journey toward strength and self-acceptance is not neat or linear; instead, it's messy and filled with as many stumbles as steps forward."

The Governor General's Literary Award peer assessment committee members Michael Hutchinson, Sharon Jennings, and Wesley King called it, "A timely novel that flows from the author's Métis and Canadian roots."
