= Jen Ferguson =

Métis writer

- Education: University of South Dakota
- Occupations: Novelist, professor
- Writing career
- Language: English
- Years active: 2021–present
- Genre: Young adult
- Notable work: The Summer of Bitter and Sweet
- Notable awards: Governor General's Award for English-language children's literature, Cybils Award
- Website: jenfergusonwrites.com

Jen Ferguson is a Michif/Métis Canadian activist and writer of young adult fiction. She is best known for her debut novel The Summer of Bitter and Sweet, which won a Governor General's Award and was nominated for the William C. Morris Award.

== Life ==
Ferguson is of Michif/Métis and Canadian settler heritage and is queer.

She has described herself as an army brat and grew up moving around Canada, spending a few years in Calgary, and then moving to Lloydminster, which she says was the first place where she witnessed anti-Indigenous violence.

Ferguson has a PhD in English and creative writing from the University of South Dakota. She teaches fiction writing at Coe College.

== Writing career ==
=== The Summer of Bitter and Sweet ===
Her debut novel, The Summer of Bitter and Sweet, was published by Heartdrum in 2022.

The Summer of Bitter and Sweet won the Governor General's Award for English-language children's literature and received starred reviews from Booklist, BookPage, Kirkus Reviews, and School Library Journal. It was also a finalist for the 2023 William C. Morris Award as well as a Stonewall Book Award Honor Book in Children's and Young Adult Literature in 2023, and won the 2022 Cybils Award for Young Adult Fiction.

=== Those Pink Mountain Nights ===
Her second novel, Those Pink Mountain Nights, is a sequel to her debut and was published by Heartdrum in 2023. It is about an Indigenous teen working her first job at an Alberta pizza shop and coming of age. It explores the topic of missing and murdered Indigenous women, mental health, and sexuality.

It was inspired by her experience working in a pizza shop in the Canadian Prairies when she was 16, a screenplay about a pizza shop she wrote in her early 20s, and the "ongoing human rights crisis happening in Canada, the U.S., and Mexico."

=== A Constellation of Minor Bears ===
Her third book, A Constellation of Minor Bears, was published in 2024.
