= Tim Tingle =

Choctaw author and laureate

- Occupation: Author
- Writing career
- Genre: Young adult fiction
- Website: www.timtingle.com

Tim Tingle is a member of the Choctaw Nation of Oklahoma an author and storyteller of twenty books.

== Early life ==
Tingle was raised on the Gulf Coast outside of Houston, Texas. He is an Oklahoma Choctaw. His great-great-grandfather, John Carnes, walked the Trail of Tears in 1835, and his paternal grandmother attended Native American boarding schools in the early 1900s. In order to preserve the legacy of the Choctaw culture, Tim's family shared stories of their heritage and the struggles that Native Americans face.

== Education ==
Tingle received a bachelor's degree in English from the University of Texas, and he received his master's degree in English literature (with a focus in Native American Studies) from the University of Oklahoma in 2003.

== Career ==
Tingle is a featured storyteller at festivals across the nation, after getting his start telling stories when he visited the school his son attended. He frequently performs at the Texas Storytelling Festival, most recently in March, 2018. In 2002, he was featured at the National Storytelling Festival. In June 2011, Tim spoke at the Library of Congress. In 2014, Tim was featured author and speaker at the National Book Festival in Washington, D.C. Tingle has also travelled to Germany to complete over ten speaking tours on behalf of the US Department of Defense, teaching children and military personnel about his experience as a Choctaw Native American. Tingle was a speaker at the Native American wing of the Smithsonian Institution in 2006 and 2007.

Tingle's first book, Walking the Choctaw Road, was recognized by Storytelling World Magazine as the Best Anthology of 2003. He has won awards for many of his other books for youth. Flying Lessons, the anthology of stories edited by Ellen Oh for the We Need Diverse Books movement includes a piece by Tingle.

== Selected works ==
=== Anthologies and short stories ===
- Walking the Choctaw Road (Cinco Puntos Press, 2003) ISBN 978-0938317746
- Texas Ghost Stories (Texas Tech University Press, 2004) ISBN 978-0896725263
- Spooky Texas Tales (Texas Tech University Press, 2005) ISBN 978-0896725652
- Spirits Dark and Light: Supernatural Tales from the Five Civilized Tribes (August House Publishers, 2006) ISBN 978-0874837780
- More Spooky Texas Tales (Texas Tech University Press, 2010) ISBN 978-0896727007
- Flying Lessons and Other Stories (Crown Books for Young Readers, 2017) ISBN 978-1101934593

=== Standalone stories ===
- Crossing Bok Chitto: A Choctaw Tale of Friendship and Freedom (Cinco Puntos Press, 2008) ISBN 978-1933693200
- Saltypie (Cinco Puntos Press, 2010) ISBN 978-1933693675
- When Turtle Grew Feathers (August House Publishers, 2013) ISBN 978-1939160218
- House of Purple Cedar (Cinco Puntos Press, 2014) ISBN 978-1935955245
- How I Became a Ghost (Roadrunner Press, 2015) ISBN 978-1937054557
- When a Ghost Talks, Listen (Roadrunner Press, 2018) ISBN 978-1937054519
- Stone River Crossing (Tu Books, 2019) ISBN 978-1937054519

=== Blackgoat series ===
- Danny Blackgoat, Navajo Prisoner (7th Generation Publishers, 2013) ISBN 978-1939053039
- Danny Blackgoat, Rugged Road to Freedom (7th Generation Publishers, 2014) ISBN 978-1939053053

=== No Name series ===
- No Name (7th Generation, 2014) ISBN 978-1-939053-06-0
- No More No Name (7th Generation, 2017) ISBN 978-1-939053-17-6
- A Name Earned (7th Generation, 2018) ISBN 978-1-939053-18-3
- Trust Your Name (7th Generation, 2018) ISBN 978-1-939053-19-0
- Name Your Mountain (7th Generation, 2020) ISBN 978-1-939053-20-6

== Honors and awards ==
- 2018 Arrell Gibson Lifetime Achievement Award
- Spirits Dark and Light: Supernatural Tales from the Five Civilized Tribes — 2006 IndieFab Award, Popular Culture (third place)
- Crossing Bok Chitto: A Choctaw Tale of Friendship and Freedom — 2007 American Library Association - Notable Children's Book (winner)
- How I Became a Ghost — 2013 American Indian Youth Literature Award - Middle School (winner); 2014 American Indian Youth Literature Award - Middle School (winner)
- House of Purple Cedar — 2016 American Indian Youth Literature Award - Young Adult (winner)
- Danny Blackgoat, Navajo Prisoner — 2013 American Indian Youth Literature Award - Middle School (Honor Book); 2014 American Indian Youth Literature Award - Middle School (Honor Book); 2014 Independent Publisher Book Award - Multicultural Fiction Young Adult (bronze medal winner)
