= Janet Smylie =

Canadian physician

- Awards: Indspire Awards

Academic background
- Education: MPH, Johns Hopkins University; MD, Queen's University at Kingston

Janet K. Smylie is a Métis family medicine physician. She is a Tier 1 Canada Research Chair in Advancing Generative Health Services for Indigenous Populations in Canada at St. Michael's Hospital.

== Early life and education ==
Smylie's father was an Irish settler father, while her mother had Métis heritage. Smylie is a member of the Métis Nation of Ontario. Her father was a professor and theoretical physicist while her mother was trained as a nurse in Saskatoon. Smylie completed her medical degree at Queen's University at Kingston and later her Master's degree in public health from Johns Hopkins University. During her time at Queen's, Smylie worked as an editor of the university's bi-monthly newspaper. Upon receiving her medical degree at the age of 23, Smylie completed her family practice residency at the University of Ottawa and the Women's Health Scholar Program at the University of Toronto in 1996.

== Career ==
Following her residency, Smylie began her medical career at the Ottawa General Hospital before moving to be a physician with Anishnawbe Health in Toronto. After working six years as a practising physician, Smylie enrolled at Johns Hopkins University for a master's degree in public health. She also accepted a leadership position with the Society of Obstetricians and Gynecologists. In 2003, Smylie received two research fellowships and a Canadian Institutes of Health Research (CIHR) operating grant to support her work with Aboriginal communities. Her work focused on identifying and piloting new models of health promotion and health measurements that were cohesive with Indigenous practices. As a result of her work, Smylie was appointed director of the Indigenous Peoples Health Research Centre at the University of Saskatchewan in 2005. The centre provides opportunities for people of Aboriginal ancestry to pursue health-related research and training. While serving as the director of the centre, Smylie was recruited by Patricia O’Campo to help develop an Indigenous health research program at St. Michael's Hospital in Toronto. Smylie immediately helped re-launch and direct The Well Living House, a research centre that focuses on Indigenous infants, children, and family health and well-being. She also oversaw the signing of a memorandum of understanding with leadership at St. Michael's Hospital to ensure that Indigenous priorities and perspectives would guide all research.

In 2011, Smylie helped establish the first health database for urban Aboriginal People in Ontario to fill the gaps in Aboriginal health information and to understand their health issues and challenges. Following this, Smylie was one of the recipients of the 2012 National Aboriginal Achievement Award. In 2015, Smylie was the lead author of the study "First Peoples, Second Class Treatment" that suggested racism against Indigenous people in the health-care system was "pervasive" and a major factor in substandard health among Indigenous peoples in Canada. She was subsequently recognized as one of the top 20 pioneers in family medicine research in Canada and was appointed an Applied Public Health Research Chair by CIHR and the Public Health Agency of Canada to "address the striking inequities in health and health service access experienced by Indigenous people in Canada."

While continuing her research in Indigenous health issues, Smylie co-organized a program in 2017 focused on improving the health of Indigenous moms and their children. The project was called "Kind Faces Sharing Places" and it aimed to recruit 100 mothers and their families to receive care from an interdisciplinary team led by Seventh Generation Midwives Toronto. She also oversaw another project entitled "Our Health Counts," which aims to overcome gaps in urban Indigenous health assessment and response. The following year, she demonstrated that the Canadian census undercounted the size of Indigenous populations in the cities of London, Ottawa, and Toronto. She also received the 2018 Mid-Career Trailblazer Award from the CIHR Institute of Population and Public Health.

During the COVID-19 pandemic, Smylie helped Indigenous Services Canada track the impact of the pandemic on Indigenous communities that live both on- and off-reserve. She also deployed a survey focused on Indigenous adults’ and children's experiences with the health care system in Thunder Bay. The results of the survey showed numerous discrepancies with the overall population, including that only 50 per cent of Thunder Bay Indigenous adults did not have a primary care practitioner and they more frequently accessed emergency care than non-Indigenous adults. Her overall efforts earned her an appointment to a Tier 1 Canada Research Chair in Advancing Generative Health Services for Indigenous Populations in Canada at St. Michael's Hospital. At the time of the appointment, she was believed to be the "first self-identified Indigenous person with kin and land ties to what is now known as Canada to be granted a Tier 1 CRC in Health." Following the death of Joyce Echaquan, Smylie co-authored an op-ed in The Globe and Mail decrying racism in the medical system. In November 2020, Smylie was selected to sit on the Ontario COVID-19 Science Advisory Table.

In 2022, Smylie was recognized by Carta Academica for her work and commitment in the field of health and inequalities in Indigenous communities in Canada. She was also elected a Fellow of the Royal Society of Canada in "recognition of her body of work, producing and translating innovative research into tangible benefits for Indigenous communities, as well as her dedication to advancing equity in health services for Indigenous peoples."
