= Margaret Manuel =

Salish writer of children's literature

Margaret Manuel is an Interior Salish writer of children's literature.

Manuel, who was born in Kamloops and raised in Merritt, British Columbia, is descended from Syilx and Secwépemc ancestors. She learned the Syilx Okanagan language at home, but is not fluent. Manuel is a graduate of the National Aboriginal Professional Artist Training Program at the En'owkin Centre in Penticton.

Her first book, I See Me, is a board book aimed at children up to age three. The book features photographs of Manuel's son, Qwyula?xw, engaged in different activities, often with traditional indigenous toys or instruments. Each photograph is captioned with an English phrase of the form "I see me ...", followed by a blank line where parents are encouraged to translate the illustrated activity into their own language. The book was published by Theytus Books in 2010 and was shortlisted for a 2010 New York Book Festival award and a 2012 American Indian Youth Literature Award. It was a bestseller in Canada.

In 2016, she published a sequel, I am Proud of Me, which again features photographs of her son with captions in English and Okanagan.
