= Lisa Charleyboy =

First Nations writer and journalist

Lisa Charleyboy is a First Nations (Tsilhqot’in) writer, storyteller, editor, and social entrepreneur. She is the editor-in-chief of Urban Native Magazine, which focuses on popular culture from an Indigenous perspective. She makes frequent appearances on radio and television, promoting her magazine and giving her opinion on current Aboriginal issues in Canada. Charleyboy has said in interviews that she considers herself a feminist and that she wants to provide positive representations of Aboriginal people in her magazine.

Charleyboy has written about cultural appropriation, popular culture, and politics, and has been named one of Toronto’s Top Bloggers and one of Canada’s Top Ten Fashion Bloggers. In 2013, she was named by Huffington Post as one of three Aboriginal millennials to watch, and recommended for a Toronto DiverseCity Fellowship for 2013-2014.

== Early life and education ==
Charleyboy moved from Abbotsford, British Columbia to Toronto to attend Ryerson University for Fashion Communication. She cites her love of magazines and desire to become a fashion editor as factors that prompted her to transfer to York University for Professional Writing.

== Career ==
In 2007 Charleyboy created a blog, Urban Native Girl, (UNG) which focuses on Indigenous contemporary life and popular culture.

In 2013 she parlayed her blog into Urban Native Magazine, a lifestyle publication geared toward inspiring Indigenous youth with positive success stories. The magazine is aimed towards Aboriginal Canadians aged from 15-35.

In 2014 Charleyboy released a book with author Mary Beth Leatherdale called "Dreaming in Indian: Contemporary Native American Voices".

Charleyboy has also served as a board member for Association for the Native Development of Visual and Performing Arts (ANDVPA), the Young Indigenous Professionals, and is now the Director of Communications for the Aboriginal Professionals of Canada (APAC). She has also been invited to give talks at Harvard University and to Aboriginal Women Entrepreneurs, and has become a regular writer/contributor and guest in the media.

In 2015, she hosted the summer documentary and interview series New Fire for CBC Radio One.

== Publications ==
=== Indigenous ===
- Not Your Pocahontas: Breaking the Stereotypes of a 21st Century Urban Native", to be released in August 2018.
- #NotYourPrincess: Voices of Native American Women. September 12, 2017 by Annick Press.
- Urban Native: Breaking Through Society's Stereotypes. October 11, 206 by Key Lime Press.
- Urban Tribes: Native Americans in the City. September 9, 2015 by Annick Press Ltd.
- Dreaming in Indian: Contemporary Native American Voices. July 24, 2014 by Annick Press.
- "Idle No More: Canada’s Indigenous People Are Demanding a Better Deal," The Guardian, January 2013
- "No Doubt, Exploiting ‘hot’ Native American Stereotypes is never OK", The Guardian, November 2012
- "In the Arctic, A Hunger for Ancestral Foods", Spirituality & Health, November 2012
- "The Ancient Art of Smudging", Spirituality & Health, November 2012
- "Native Fashion; The Good, The Bad, and The Ugly", CBC, January 2012
- iLit Strength and Struggle: Perspectives From First Nations, Inuit, and Métis Peoples in Canada. May 2, 2011 by McGraw-Hill Ryerson.
- "2010 Winter Olympics token tribute and Memorial March for Indigenous Women" Georgia Straight, February 14, 2010

=== Fashion ===
- "Urban Native Girl: Huntress On The Rise", Indian Country Magazine, August 2011
- "Urban Native Girl Muks It Up", Indian Country Magazine, February 2011
- "Fall in love with the season’s top trends", MSN.ca, September 2010
- "Luggage That’s Worth Its (light) weight", Travel Goods, Fashion and Accessories, Summer 2010
- "‘Bags that Really Have It All", Travel Goods, Fashion and Accessories, Summer 2010
- "Spring Fashion Trends", MSN.ca, February 2010

=== Lifestyle ===
- "Go Green with your Beauty Routine", MSN.ca, March 2010
- "Destress Your Life", MSN.ca, January 2010
- "Original Wedding Gifts", MSN.ca, February 2010

=== Education and employment ===
- "Behind Inclusion Works, Canada’s top Aboriginal Career Convention", Job Postings Magazine, October 2012
- "Canadian Roots Exchange Brings Aboriginal Education to Life", Job Postings Magazine, October 2012
- "Northward Bound", Job Postings Magazine, November 2010
- "Aboriginal Opportunities", Job Postings Magazine, September 2010

== Reception ==
=== #NotYourPrincess (2017) ===
#Notyourprincess: Voices of Native American Women received the American Indian Youth Literature Award for Best Young Adult Book (2018) and was a YALSA Award for Excellence in Nonfiction Finalist (2018).

=== Dreaming in Indian (2014) ===
Dreaming in Indian: Contemporary Native American Voices was a 2016 American Indian Youth Literature Award for Best Middle Grade Book Honor Book.
