= MariJo Moore =

American poet

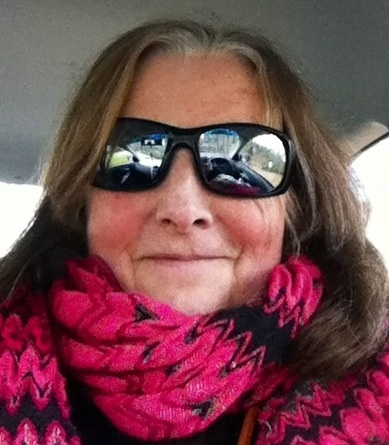
MariJo Moore, April 2013.

MariJo Moore is an American writer who takes inspiration from Native American culture in her writing. She is of Dutch, Irish, and Cherokee descent. She won the title of Writer of the Year (2002) by the Wordcraft Circle of Native Writers and Storytellers, one of the most prestigious awards in the Native American literary world.

She has edited several collections, including Eating Fire, Tasting Blood: Breaking the Great Silence of the American Indian Holocaust (2005) and Genocide of the Mind: New Writings by Native Americans (2002), "Unraveling the Spreading Cloth of Time: Indigenous Thoughts Concerning the Universe, Dedicated to Vine Deloria, Jr" (2014), and "When Spirits Visit: A Collection of Stories by Indigenous Writers" (2015). She is also the author of "A Book of Spiritual Wisdom for all days", "Bear Quotes", "Tree Quotes", "Crow Quotes", "Spirit Voices of Bones", and "Red Woman With Backward Eyes and Other Stories".

== Personal life ==
Moore was raised in Western Tennessee. She now lives in Asheville, North Carolina. According to Moore, her mother is white and her paternal grandfather was Cherokee. She wrote that her grandfather was not enrolled because he "didn't want an enrollment number".
