= Amy Reed =

American author

Amy Reed is an author of young adult novels in the United States.

Her book Nowhere Girls has been challenged in some school districts. It is a fictionalized account of a group of girls facing sexual pressures from boys. It is a response to events drawn from media reports of a point scoring system a group of boys adopted for having penetrative sex and the ramifications of the competition. It was removed from public school libraries in Martin County, Florida. The group Moms for Liberty included the book on a list of those it sought to have removed from public schools in Florida.

Kirkus Reviews described the book as "highly nuanced and self-reflective narrative that captures rape culture’s ubiquitous harm without swerving into didactic, one-size-fits-all solutions or relying on false notions of homogenous young womanhood." Flagler County's public school system voted to keep the book on school bookshelves. The book was also challenged in Escambia County, Florida. The Escambia School Board voted to return it to shelves based on a recommendation from its Materials Review Committee in 2023 after it was challenged, along with three other books, by a Northview High School teacher who alleged LGBTQ indoctrination, race-baiting, and anti-whiteness among her reasons for objecting to the books.

== Books ==
- The Culting of America (2026), co-authored with Daniella Mestyanek Young
- Our Stories, Our Voices (2018), editor
- The Boy and Girl Who Broke the World (2019)
- Nowhere Girls (2017)
- Tell Me My Name (2021)
- Unforgivable (2016)
- Invincible (2015)
- Damaged (2014)
- Over You (2013)
- Crazy (2012)
- Clean (2011)
- Beautiful (2009)
