= Cody Greenwood =

Australian producer

- Born: London, United Kingdom
- Education: Curtin University
- Occupation: Film Producer
- Parents: Mark Greenwood (father); Frané Lessac (mother)

Cody Greenwood is an Australian film producer and the founder of production company Rush Films. She is an AACTA Awards winner.

== Early life and education ==
Greenwood was raised in Fremantle, Western Australia, by her mother, artist and children’s book illustrator Frané Lessac, and her father, writer Mark Greenwood. Encouraged to pursue creativity from an early age, she attended an arts-focused high school, where she developed her filmmaking skills. She studied film and television at Curtin University.

== Career ==
Greenwood began her career in London, before moving to Los Angeles where she worked for Heath Ledger’s production company The Masses. She founded her own company Rush Films in 2016. In 2018, Greenwood was selected for Screen Producers Australia’s Ones to Watch program, and subsequently returned to Western Australia after working overseas.

Under the Volcano marked Greenwood's debut as a feature documentary producer and screenwriter. The film examines the history of Air Studios Montserrat, established by Beatles producer Sir George Martin, where leading artists such as Elton John, Paul McCartney, The Rolling Stones, The Police, and Duran Duran recorded music during the 1980s. The film premiered at the South by Southwest (SXSW) festival at Austin, Texas, on 19 March 2021 and screened at Sydney Film Festival. In the same year, she released Girl Like You which was supported by Screen Australia. It made its international premiere at Raindance Film Festival, UK, where it screened as part of the festival’s queer programming.

In June 2024, Otto by Otto, produced by Greenwood alongside Nicole O’Donohue, premiered on Stan. Directed by Gracie Otto, the documentary examines the life and career of her father, Australian actor Barry Otto, including his later life experiences with dementia. The film was named a finalist for the Documentary Australia Award at the Sydney Film Festival. At the 2025 Australian Academy of Cinema and Television Arts Awards, Greenwood, along with Nicole O’Donohue and Gracie Otto, won the award for Best Documentary for the film.

In early 2025, Greenwood served as a producer on the documentary series Never Get Busted!, which premiered at the Sundance Film Festival in the Episodic Pilot Showcase and went on to screen at the Melbourne International Film Festival. Greenwood produced alongside John Battsek, Chris Smith, Daniel Joyce, Louise Schultze and others, with development support from Screen Australia and the South Australian Film Corporation.

In mid 2025, Greenwood produced Birthright, the debut feature from writer-director Zoe Pepper. The dark comedy-thriller, centred on generational disillusionment and filmed in the Perth Hills, had its world premiere at the Tribeca Film Festival.

== Selected filmography ==
Year	Film	Role	Notes
2021	Under The Volcano	Producer, Writer	
2021	Girl Like You	Producer	
2024	Renee Gracie: Fireproof	Producer	
2024	Otto by Otto	Producer	
2024	Never Get Busted!	Producer	
2025	Birthright	Producer	
