= Eric Gansworth =

Haudenosaunee writer and illustrator from New York, U.S.

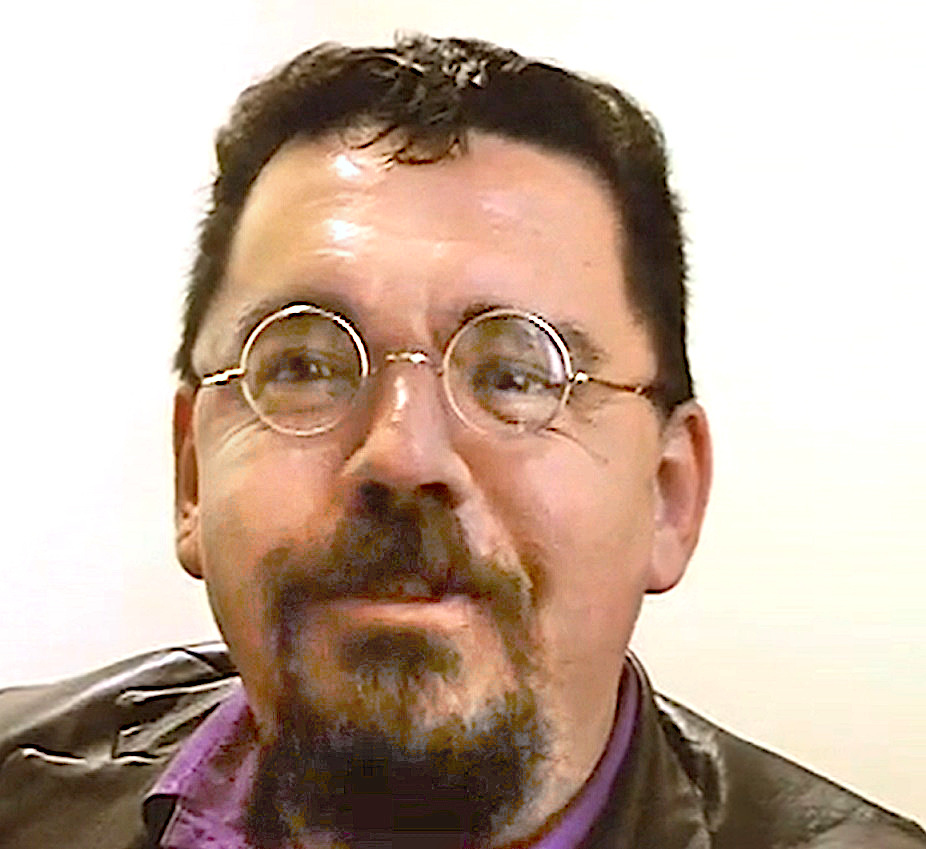
- Eric Gansworth (c. 2004)
- Born: 1965 (age 60–61); Tuscarora Indian Nation
- Education: Tuscarora Indian School, Niagara County Community College, State University College at Buffalo
- Occupations: Professor of English and Lowery Writer-in-Residence at Canisius College
- Writing career
- Language: English
- Genre: Native American literature
- Subject: Contemporary Haudenosaunee culture
- Notable works: Mending Skins (2005); Extra Indians (2010); If I Ever Get Out of Here (2013)
- Notable awards: American Book Award (2011) for Extra Indians; PEN Oakland-Josephine Miles National Literary Award (2006) for Mending Skins
- Website: ericgansworth.com

Eric Gansworth (born 1965) is a Haudenosaunee novelist, poet and visual artist from New York. He is a citizen of the Onondaga Nation and Tuscarora descendant.

== Early life ==
Gansworth was born in 1965 and is an enrolled citizen of the Onondaga Nation, belonging to the Eel Clan. He grew up in the Tuscarora Nation as a descendant of one of two Onondaga women present among the Tuscarora at the foundation of the nation in the 18th century. Gansworth originally qualified in electroencephalography, considered a profession useful to his nation; however, he went on to study literature and to continue a lifelong interest in painting and drawing.

== Work ==
Gansworth has written five novels, including the award-winning Mending Skins (2005) and Extra Indians (2010). In all his novels, illustrations form an integral part of the reading experience. His critically acclaimed first young adult novel, If I Ever Get out of Here, deals with the friendship between two boys, one a resident of the Tuscarora Nation, the other living on the nearby Air Force base. In a starred review, Booklist stated that the book succeeded in "sidestepping stereotypes to offer two genuine characters navigating the unlikely intersection of two fully realized worlds."

Gansworth states that growing up he was struck by an absence of images of contemporary Native American life to use as drawing practice, noting that "I could offer images from the Planet of the Apes, The Towering Inferno, Spiderman and, of course, Batman, but I had a critical shortage of Indian drawings." Subsequently, in his literary studies he was again critical of the lack of American Indian authored texts offered on his courses. Much of his current literary and artistic drive can be seen as attempting to overcome this lack of attention. Gansworth himself sees the two themes most important to his work as being "the ways history informs the present" and also a strong interest in entertainment culture.

Critic Susan Bernardin has analyzed Gansworth's writing via Gerald Vizenor's concept of survivance, suggesting that his novel Mending Skins "suggests how Native peoples reimagine patterns of loss into new stories, especially through humored stories of survivance."

His nonfiction book Apple (Skin to the Core) (2000" won a Michael L. Printz honor for best young adult writing.

== Visual arts ==
Gansworth's art career began with "trying to hawk my drawings to the folks who lived down the road"; his professional career, however, began with the exhibition Nickel Eclipse: Iroquois Moon in 1999. Since then, he has exhibited regularly. One of his images was chosen for the cover of Sherman Alexie's novel First Indian on the Moon.

== Bibliography ==
=== Novels ===
- Indian Summers. American Indian Studies. Michigan State University Press. 1998. ISBN 978-0870134791.
- Smoke Dancing. Michigan State University Press. 2004. ISBN 978-0870137082.
- Mending Skins. Native Storiers: A Series of American Narratives. Bison Books. 2005. ISBN 978-0803271180.
- Extra Indians. Milkweed Editions. 2010. ISBN 978-1571310798.

=== Young adult ===
- If I Ever Get Out of Here. Arthur A. Levine Books. 2013. ISBN 978-0545417303.
- Give Me Some Truth. Arthur A. Levine Books. 2018. ISBN 978-1338143546.
- Apple (Skin to the Core). Arthur A. Levine Books. 2020.

=== Poetry ===
- Nickel Eclipse: Iroquois Moon. American Indian Studies. Michigan State University Press. 2000. ISBN 978-0870135644.
- Breathing the Monster Alive. Bright Hill Press Word & Image Series. Bright Hill Press. 2006. ISBN 978-1892471406.
- A Half-Life of Cardio-Pulmonary Function: Poems and Paintings. The Iroquois and Their Neighbors. Syracuse University Press. 2008. ISBN 978-0815609001.
- From the Western Door to the Lower West Side. Co-created with Milton Rogovin. White Pine Press. 2009. ISBN 978-1935210108.

=== Edited anthology ===
- Sovereign Bones: New Native American Writing. Nation Books. 2007. ISBN 978-1568583570.

== See also ==
- List of writers from peoples indigenous to the Americas
- List of Native American artists
- Visual arts by indigenous peoples of the Americas
