= North Dakota State University Press =

Historical publishing institute

- Parent company: North Dakota State University
- Predecessor: North Dakota Institute for Regional Studies Press
- Founded: 1950
- Country of origin: United States
- Headquarters location: Fargo, North Dakota
- Publication types: Books
- Official website: ndsupress.org

The North Dakota State University Press (also known as NDSU Press) is a historical publishing institute located at North Dakota State University. The NDSU Press is for publishing literary works with a “regional focus,” which includes the regions of “the Red River Valley, the state of North Dakota, the plains of North America (comprising both the Great Plains of the United States and the prairies of Canada), and comparable regions of other continents.”

This institute was originally established in 1950 as the North Dakota Institute for Regional Studies (NDIRS). The established purpose of the NDIRS, at the time, was to form a regional research center and to “stimulate” research focused on the region. To support this purpose, NDIRS formed archives that still serve as a repository for regional historical documents and regional-based scholarly works. The institute also developed a program for publishing those works that fell within the institute's regional purposes.

The publishing program has evolved over the years and was established as the North Dakota State University Press in January 2016. The press continues “to operate under the umbrella of the North Dakota Institute for Regional Studies, located at North Dakota State University.”

The press is a member of the Community of Literary Magazines and Presses (CLMP).

== See also ==
- List of English-language book publishing companies
- List of university presses
