= Arigon Starr =

- Occupations: Singer, actor, writer, artist
- Label: Wacky Productions
- Website: www.arigonstarr.com

Arigon Starr is a Kickapoo singer, actor, playwright and comic book writer, who is known for her one-woman shows. She has won numerous awards for her music, art, and plays, including the Native American Music Awards for Best Independent Recording in 1999 and Songwriter of the Year in 2007. In 2016, Starr edited the graphic novel Tales of the Mighty Code Talkers, which was named one of the American Library Associations 2018 Great Graphic Novels for Teens. She won a Tulsa Artist Fellowship in 2017 and her play Round House was produced by the New Native Play Festival in 2018.

Starr has stated that her writings are intended to counter negative Indigenous stereotypes. She is the first Native American woman to have her own record label: "Wacky Productions" and has created four albums under this label.

== Personal life ==
Starr was born in Pensacola, Florida to her parents Ken and Ruth Wahpecome and she is an enrolled member of the Kickapoo Tribe of Oklahoma and is of Muscogee ancestry. When Starr got older, she relocated to Los Angeles, where she worked at entertainment companies such as Viacom and Showtime Network. Starr eventually left her corporate job to become a full-time musician.

== Super Indian ==
The idea of Super Indian, Starr's first comic, started in Brisbane, Australia at an Indigenous Theatre Workshop where she thought of an idea of a Native American superhero. In 2007, Arigon wrote a ten-part radio comedy series for the Native Radio Theater Project and Native Voices at the Autry. The show was directed by William Dufris, in productions of Joseph A. Dandurand, and on Aboriginal Voices radio. She then began using all the scripts and prototypes that were used in the radio show to craft the beginnings of the comic. When Starr first started the comic, she had very little knowledge of behind comic production and had only drawn comics as a child. She worked on the unpublished "Super Indian: Origins", a 23-page comic that closely follows the first episode of the radio series. She and her editor Janet Miner created Rezium Studios where she launched the "Super Indian" as a webcomic in April 2011. Starr posted a webcomic Monday with a few new panels every week. The two and a half stories that were published online eventually made up the first edition of Super Indian. Starr created the second volume of Super Indian in 2015 and is working on a third volume to be released in 2020.

Super Indian, otherwise known as Hubert Logan was an ordinary Reservation boy until he ate tainted commodity cheese Government cheese infused with Rezium, a secret government food enrichment additive. As a character, Logan is written to be bold, brash, self-effacing and humorous. Known as Super Indian, Logan fights evil forces who would overtake the Reservation's resources and population. Assisted by his trusty sidekicks Mega Bear and Diogi, they fight crime.

== Works ==
=== Discography ===
- Meet the Diva, 1999 (Winner of a Nammy Award for Best Independent Recording)
- Wind Up, 2000 (Features the song "Junior Frybread" which won the 2001 Native American Music Awards Song of the year)
- Backflip, 2002
- The Red Road - Original Cast Recording, 2006 (Winner of Best Contemporary CD at the 15th Annual First Americans in the Arts Award)

=== Bibliography ===
- Super Indian, #1-2 (with Janet Miner)
- Moonshot: The Indigenous Comics Collection, #1 (with Hope Nicholson and various artists)
- Tales of the Mighty Code Talkers #1, with Janet Miner, INC Comics, and Lee Francis IV. (Winner of the 2018 AILA Youth Literature Best Middle School Book Award and named one of the ALA's 2018 Great Graphic Novels for Teens)

=== Plays ===
- The Red Road
- Round Dance (selected as top, featured play at the 2018 Native American New Play Festival)
