= Cynthia Leitich Smith =

Muscogee-American writer (born 1967)

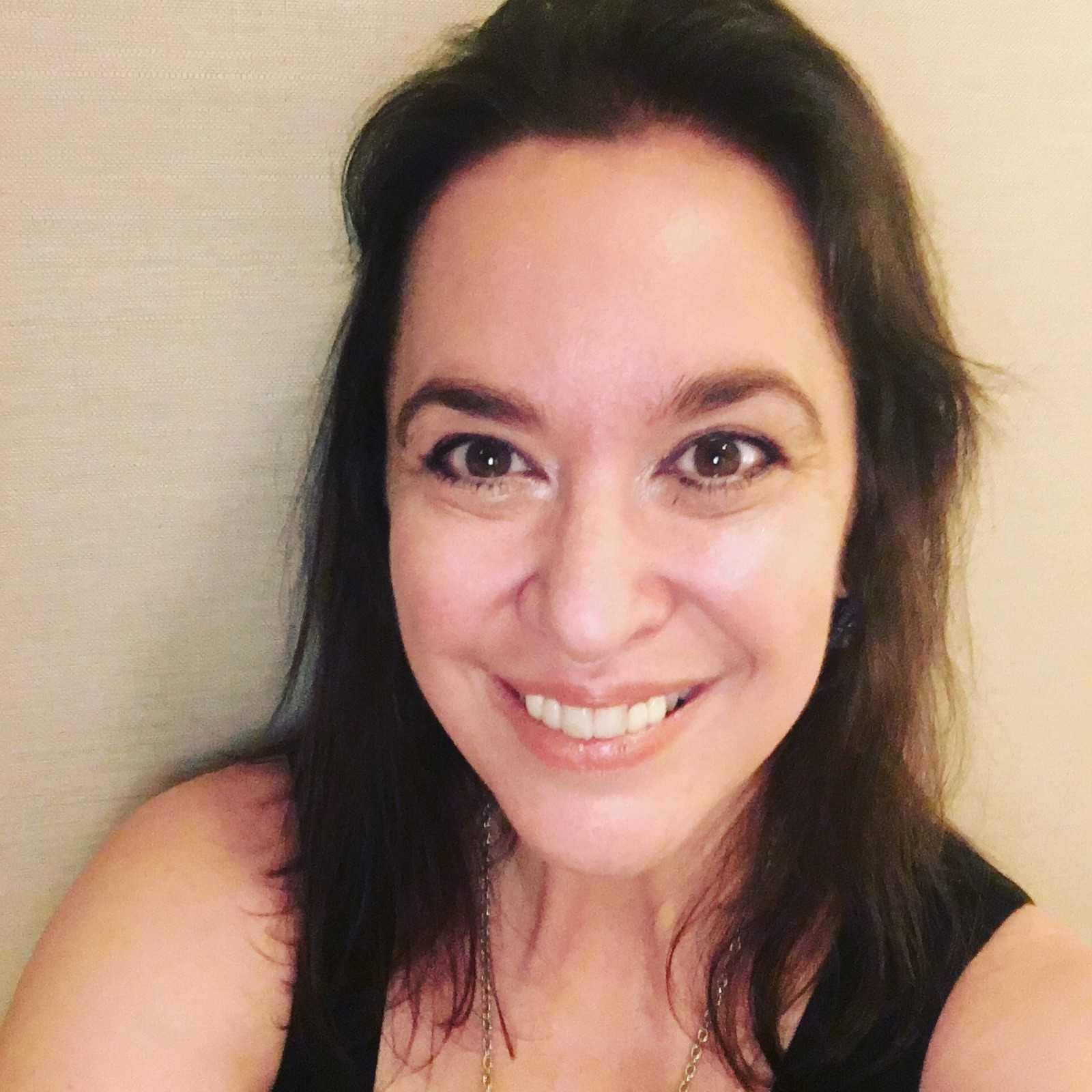
- Born: 1967 (age 58–59)
- Citizenship: United States; Muscogee Nation
- Education: University of Kansas (B.A., 1990); University of Michigan Law School (JD)
- Writing career
- Period: 2000–present
- Genres: Children's and young adult fiction, Native American literature, Gothic fantasy/horror, humor, realistic fiction
- Website: cynthialeitichsmith.com

Cynthia Leitich Smith (born 1967) is an American author of fiction for children and young adults. A citizen of the Muscogee Nation, her fiction centers on the lives of modern-day Native Americans.

She has also written picture books and gothic fantasies for readers aged 14 and older. Regarded by the press as an expert in children's-young adult (YA) literature, she also hosts a website for Children's Literature Resources.

== Early and personal life ==
Smith was interested in writing from a young age, and was editor of her high school newspaper. She began writing short stories in college. She is a graduate of the University of Kansas (B.A. in journalism, 1990) and The University of Michigan Law School.

She lives in Denton, Texas, having previously lived in Chicago and Austin, Texas. She is a citizen of the Muscogee Nation. Her grandfather attended a residential school in Oklahoma in the 1930s.

== Career ==
Smith previously taught part-time at St. Edward's University in Austin, Texas.

For over twenty years, Smith served on the faculty of the Vermont College of Fine Arts MFA program in Writing for Children and Young Adults, where she held the inaugural Katherine Paterson Endowed Chair. Smith is also the author-curator of Heartdrum, a Native-focused imprint of HarperCollins. She is published by Heartdrum and by Candlewick Press.

== Awards ==
- 2021 NSK Neustadt Prize for Children’s Literature
- 2024 Southern Mississippi Medallion Winner
- 2026 Michael L. Printz Award for Legendary Frybread Drive-In: Intertribal Stories

== Selected texts ==
=== Jingle Dancer ===
Jingle Dancer, illustrated by Cornelius Van Wright and Ying-Hwa Hu, is a picture book published in 2000 by Morrow/HarperCollins. The book was a finalist for the Oklahoma Book Award, a runner-up for the Western Writers of America Storyteller Award, and is listed as a Notable Children's Trade Book in the Field of Social Studies, on the 2002 Texas 2x2 list, and on the 2002 Michigan Reader's Choice Award List.

=== Rain Is Not My Indian Name ===
Rain Is Not My Indian Name is a realistic novel for ages 10 and up. Upon its publication by HarperCollins, Smith was recognized as 2001 Writer of the Year by Wordcraft Circle of Native Writers and Storytellers. Like Jingle Dancer, it was a finalist for the Oklahoma Book Award. An audio book version of this title is available from Listening Library/Random House.

=== Indian Shoes ===
Indian Shoes is a chapter book for ages 7 and up. Published in 2002 by HarperCollins, it was selected for inclusion on the NEA Native American Book List. It is also listed as a Notable Children's Trade Book in the Field of Social Studies, the 2003 Best Children's Books of the Year by Bank Street College of Education, and Choices 2003 by the Cooperative Children's Book Center.

=== Santa Knows ===
Santa Knows, co-written by Greg Leitich Smith and illustrated by Steve Bjorkman, is a humorous holiday picture book, published in 2006 by Dutton, for ages 4 and older. In 2006, it was included among "Holiday High Notes" by the Horn Book, "Worthy Stories for the Holidays" by the Miami Herald, and cheered as a "newly minted winner" by Kirkus Reviews.

=== Tantalize ===
Tantalize is a young adult gothic fantasy novel, published in 2007 by Candlewick Press. Fantasy elements include vampires and shapeshifters. The novel is a genre bender, employing elements of mystery, suspense, comedy, romance, and gothic fantasy. It was also published in 2008 by Listening Library/Random House, Walker Books U.K., Walker Books Australia and New Zealand, and Editions Intervista in France. Tantalize was named to the 2011 list of Popular Paperbacks by the Young Adult Library Services Association (YALSA) and featured at the 2007 National Book Festival in Washington, D.C.

=== Eternal ===
Eternal is a young adult gothic fantasy novel, published in 2009 and 2010 by Candlewick Press, for ages 14 and up. Fantasy elements include angels, vampires and shapeshifters. The novel is a genre bender, employing elements of mystery, suspense, comedy, romance, and Gothic fantasy. It also was published by Listening Library/Random House, Walker Books U.K., Walker Books Australia and New Zealand, and Amber in Poland. The U.S. paperback edition debuted at #5 on the New York Times best-seller list (children's paperbacks) and #13 on the Publishers Weekly best-seller list.

=== Blessed ===
Blessed is a young adult gothic fantasy novel, published in 2011 by Candlewick Press, for ages 14 and up. Fantasy elements include angels, vampires, and shapeshifters. The novel is a genre bender, employing elements of mystery, suspense, comedy, romance, and gothic fantasy. It also was published by Walker Books Australia and New Zealand and Walker U.K. Blessed was a YALSA Teens Top 10 nominee.

=== Hearts Unbroken ===
Hearts Unbroken is a realistic young adult novel, published in 2018 by Candlewick Press, for ages 14 and up. It also was published by Walker Books Australia and New Zealand. Hearts Unbroken was named a Silver Medal Winner for Young Adult Fiction by Foreword Reviews. In addition, it was named winner of the American Indian Youth Literature Award (Best Young Adult Book) by the American Indian Library Association.

== Works ==
=== Books ===
- Feral Nights (2013)
- Eternal: Zachary's Story (2013)
- Feral Curse (2014)
- Feral Pride (2015)
- On a Wing and a Tear (2024)

=== Novels ===
==== Middle grade novels ====
- Rain Is Not My Indian Name (2001)
- Indian Shoes (2002)
- Sisters of the Neversea (2021, Heartdrum)

==== Young adult novels ====
- Tantalize (2007, Candlewick Press)
- Eternal (2009, Candlewick Press)
- Blessed (2011)
- Diabolical (2012, Candlewick Press)
- Hearts Unbroken (2018, Candlewick Press)
- Harvest House (2023, Candlewick Press)

==== Graphic novels ====
- Tantalize: Kieren's Story. Illustrated by Ming Doyle. Candlewick Press. 2011.
- Leitich Smith, Cynthia; Magoon, Kekla (2024). Blue Stars: Mission One: The Vice Principal Problem. Illustrated by Molly Murakami. Candlewick Press).

=== Picture books ===
- Jingle Dancer. Illustrated by Cornelius Van Wright and Ying-Hwa Hu. New York: Morrow Junior Books. 2000. ISBN 978-0-688-16241-2.
- Smith, Cynthia Leitich; Smith, Greg Leitich (2006). Santa Knows. Illustrated by Steve Björkman (1st ed.). New York, N.Y: Dutton Children's Books. ISBN 978-0-525-47757-0.
- Holler Loudly (2010)
- Firefly Season. Illustrated by Kate Gardiner (1st ed.). New York, NY: Heartdrum. May 13, 2025. ISBN 978-0-06-327444-0. OCLC 1513844620.
- Here Come the Aunties!. Illustrated by Aphelandra (1st ed.). New York, NY: Heartdrum. February 10, 2026. ISBN 978-0-06-337469-0. OCLC 1565149646.

=== As editor ===
- Ancestor Approved: Intertribal Stories for Kids. New York, NY: Heartdrum. 2021. ISBN 978-0-06-286994-4.
- Legendary Frybread Drive-In: Intertribal Stories (1st ed.). New York, NY: Heartdrum. August 26, 2025. ISBN 978-0-06-331426-9. OCLC 1474007340.

=== Short stories, essays and poetry ===
- "The Gentleman Cowboy". Period Pieces: Stories for Girls. HarperCollins. 2003.
- "The Naked Truth". In My Grandmother's House: Award-Winning Authors tell Stories about their Grandmothers. HarperCollins. 2003.
- Carlson, Lori M., ed. (2005). "A Real-Live Blonde Cherokee and His Equally Annoyed Soul Mate". Moccasin Thunder: American Indian Stories for Today (1st ed.). New York: HarperCollins. ISBN 978-0-06-623957-6.
- "Riding With Rosa" in Cicada literary magazine (Vol. 7, No. 4, March/April 2005) for ages 12 and up.
- "Haunted Love" in Immortal: Love Stories with Bite, published by BenBella in 2008 for ages 12 and up.
- "Cat Calls" in Sideshow: Ten Original Tales of Freaks, Illusionists, and Other Matters Odd and Magical, published by Candlewick Press in 2009 for ages 12 and up.
- "The Wrath of Dawn," co-authored by Greg Leitich Smith in Geektastic: Stories from the Nerd Herd, published by Little, Brown in 2009 for ages 12 and up.
- "Isolation" in Dear Bully: Seventy Authors Tell Their Stories, published by HarperCollins in 2011 for ages 13 and up.
- "Mooning Over Broken Stars" in Girl Meets Boy, published by Chronicle in 2012 for ages 12 and up.
- "Friends in Dark Places" in Dear Teen Me, published by Zest in 2012 for ages 12 and up.
- "Cupid's Beaux" in Things I'll Never Say: Stories About Our Secret Selves, published by Candlewick in 2015 for ages 12 and up.
- "All's Well" in Violent Ends, published by Simon Pulse in 2015 for ages 12 and up.
- "Dreams to Write". Our Story Begins: Your Favorite Authors and Illustrators Share Fun, Inspiring, and Occasionally Ridiculous Things They Wrote and Drew as Kids. Atheneum Press. 2017.
- "Girl's Best Friend". The Hero Next Door. Random House. 2019.
- "Stories for Dinner". Thanku: Poems of Gratitude. Millbrook Press. 2019.
- "Amazing Auntie Ann". I Remember: Poems and Pictures of Heritage. Lee & Low. 2019.
- "Superhero". Hop to It: Poems to Get You Moving. Pomelo Books. 2020.
- ""Patent Red" and "Open Mic at the Drive-In"". Legendary Frybread Drive-In: Intertribal Stories (1st ed.). New York, NY: Heartdrum. August 26, 2025. ISBN 978-0-06-331426-9. OCLC 1474007340.

== See also ==
- List of writers from peoples indigenous to the Americas
