= Tasha Spillett-Sumner =

Canadian author and educator

Tasha Spillett
- Born: Tasha Spillett
- Education: University of Saskatchewan
- Notable work: Surviving the City
- Website: tashaspillett.com

Tasha Spillett is a Canadian author and educator. She is best known for her young adult graphic novel series Surviving the City, volume 1 of which won the Best Work in an Alternative Format at the 2019 Indigenous Voices Awards.

== Career ==
Spillett competed in the 2014 Miss Indian World pageant. She was chosen as Miss Congeniality. Spillett was a board member of Manito Ahbee and served as the chair of the Miss Manito Ahbee Youth Ambassador gathering, which honoured of missing and murdered indigenous women and girls. Spillett also mentored young Indigenous people in Winnipeg through Sister Circle. Spillett has taught both high school social studies and English in addition to land-based knowledge workshops and programs.

In 2018, Spillett's debut graphic novel, Surviving the City, vol. 1, was published by Highwater Press. The book was illustrated by Natasha Donovan and depicts two young Indigenous women, Miikwan, who is Anishinaabe, and Dez, who is Inninew. The second volume of Surviving the City, "From the Roots Up" was released in October 2020, with the third and final volume "We Are the Medicine" being published in 2024.

In April 2021, Spillett released the picture book I Sang You Down from the Stars, illustrated by Michaela Goade. I Sang You Down from the Stars debuted at number 3 on the New York Times Best Seller List and remained there for a week. Spillett began writing the book while pregnant with her daughter, Isabella. Spillett's second picture book, Beautiful You, Beautiful Me, was published in 2022. It was defended by Janaye as part of the 2023 CBC Kids Reads.

== Personal life ==
Spillett is of Cree and Trinidadian descent. She has a master's degree in land-based Indigenous education from the University of Saskatchewan. Spillett has also completed her PhD there. She received the Queen Elizabeth II Centennial Aboriginal Scholarship to pursue her PhD.

== Awards ==
In 2019, "Surviving the City" was awarded Best Work in an Alternative Format at the Indigenous Voices Awards. At the American Library Association's 2020 Youth Media Awards, Spillett's "Surviving the City" was awarded a Young Adult Book Honor. I Sang You Down from the Stars was award the McNally Robinson Book for Young People award at the 2022 Manitoba Book Awards.

== Works ==
- Surviving the City
  - Volume 1: "Surviving the City" – illustrated by Natasha Donovan (2018), as Tasha Spillett
  - Volume 2: "From the Roots Up" – illustrated by Natasha Donovan (2020)
  - Volume 3: "We Are the Medicine" – illustrated by Natasha Donovan (2024)
- I Sang You Down from the Stars – illustrated by Michaela Goade (2021)
- Beautiful You, Beautiful Me – illustrated by Salini Perera (2022)
