= North Dakota Library Association =

Professional association for librarians in North Dakota

- Nickname: NDLA
- Formation: January 18, 1906; 120 years ago
- Parent organization: American Library Association
- Website: ndla.info

The North Dakota Library Association (NDLA) is a professional association for librarians, library staff, and library supporters that represent school, public, academic, and special libraries located in North Dakota, United States. "The purpose of this organization is to exercise professional leadership and to promote library services and librarianship." The North Dakota Library Association was formed on January 18, 1906. The association has humble beginnings – at the 1909 conference, there were only 18 members. There are currently over 300 NDLA members (including academic, health, public, and school libraries).

== Executive board ==
The NDLA's executive board includes 27 members, including: president; president-elect; past president; secretary; treasurer; American Library Association councilor; Mountain Plains Library Association representative; Academic & Special Libraries Section; Government Documents Roundtable; Health Science Information Section; New Members Roundtable; Public Library Section; School & Library Youth Service Section; Technical Services Roundtable; Constitution, Bylaws & Policies; Continuing Education; Finance; Intellectual Freedom; Legislative; Nominations, Elections & Voting; Membership; Professional Development; public relations & 2014–26 executive secretary; The Good Stuff Editorial; archivist/historian; state librarian; and web editor. The executive board is responsible for the transactions of “all business of the North Dakota Library Association”, speaking “for the NDLA membership on national, state, and local library issues”, setting “goals and executes long-range plans for the NDLA”, taking “no position on social issues that do not directly impact libraries” and following “through on directives expressed by NDLA members at the Annual Conference and by section and roundtable decision.” The executive board “meets at least three times a year” and “all meetings are open to the NDLA membership.”

== Librarian of the Year Awards ==
NDLA awards a Librarian of the Year award annually since 1992 for "notable contributions to the North Dakota library profession, .. significant development of libraries in North Dakota, or .. exemplary statewide service for an extended period of time."

Name	Library	Location	Year
Ruth Evert	Edgeley Public Library	Edgeley	1992
Cheryl Bailey	University of Mary Library	Bismarck	1993
Bev Quamme	Carl Ben Eielson Elementary School Library	Fargo	1994
Neil Price / Sally Oremland	University of North Dakota / North Dakota State Library	Grand Forks / Bismarck	1995
Blanche Stangeland	Carrington Public Library	Carrington	1996
Dennis Page	Grand Forks Public Library	Grand Forks	1997
Shelby Harken	Chester Fritz Library, University of North Dakota	Grand Forks	1998
Thomas Jones	Bismarck Public Library	Bismarck	1999
Mike Jaugstetter (posthumous)	North Dakota State Library	Bismarck	2000
Cyndy Schaff	Williston Community Library	Williston	2001
Betty Gard	Chester Fritz Library, University of North Dakota	Grand Forks	2002
Iris Swedlund	Velva School and Public Library	Velva	2003
Jerry Kaup	Minot Public Library	Minot	2004
Cheryl Tollefson	Dickinson Area Public Library	Dickinson	2005
Kathy Thomas	North Dakota State University Libraries	Fargo	2006
Marlene Anderson	Bismarck State College Library	Bismarck	2007
Michael M. Miller	North Dakota State University Libraries	Fargo	2008
Jan Wysocki	Bottineau Library, Minot State University	Bottineau	2009
Doris Ott	North Dakota State Library	Bismarck	2010
Marilyn Guttromson Johnson (Retired)		Bismarck	2011
Christine Kujawa	Bismarck Public Library	Bismarck	2012
Kathy Thomas (Retired)	North Dakota State University Libraries	Fargo	2013
Sandra Hannahs	West Fargo Public Library	West Fargo	2014
Paulette Nelson	Minot Public Library	Minot	2015
Wendy Wendt / Greta Guck	Grand Forks Public Library / Leach Public Library	Grand Forks / Wahpeton	2016
Kelly Steckler (posthumous)	Morton Mandan Public Library	Mandan	2017
Laurie McHenry	Thormodsgard Law Library	Grand Forks	2018

== See also ==
- List of libraries in the United States
