= Charlotte Huck Award =

American literary award for children's fiction

The Charlotte Huck Award for Outstanding Fiction for Children, established in 2014 and organized by the National Council of Teachers of English (NCTE), is an annual American literary award for children's fiction books. According to NCTE, the "award recognizes fiction that has the potential to transform children’s lives by inviting compassion, imagination, and wonder."

The award honors Charlotte Huck, a former NCTE president and American author, university professor, and children's literature expert. Huck, who taught elementary school before joining the Faculty of Education at the Ohio State University, "believed that good literature should be at the heart and center of the elementary school curriculum." Given this belief, she established the university's first course in children's literature and eventually "develop[ed] master's and doctoral programs in children's literature."

== Award eligibility and criteria ==
To be eligible for the Charlotte Huck Award, books "must have been published or distributed in the United States or its territories during the preceding year." All genres of fictional books aimed at children are eligible for the award, including picture books, graphic novels, novels written in verse, etc. NCTE indicates nominated books "should have exemplary literary quality of text and illustrations" and "should connect children to their own humanity and offer them a rich experience with the power to influence their lives and stretch their thinking, feelings, and imagination."

Eligible books are judged on the following criteria:

- It "invites compassion, imagination, and wonder."
- It "connects children to their own humanity and offers them a rich experience with the power to influence their lives."
- It "stretches children’s thinking, feelings, and imagination."
- It "exhibits literary quality of text and illustrations."
- It has been "published in the United States or its territories during the previous calendar year."
- Its "primary audience is children ages three to twelve."

== Honorees ==
Charlotte Huck Award honorees
| Year | Author | Title | Result | Ref. |
|---|---|---|---|---|
| 2015 | Ann M. Martin | Rain Reign | Winner | |
| 2015 | Kwame Alexander | The Crossover | Honor | |
| 2015 | Cece Bell | El Deafo | Honor | |
| 2015 | Marla Frazee | The Farmer and the Clown | Honor | |
| 2015 | Lisa Graff | Absolutely Almost | Honor | |
| 2015 | Deborah Wiles | Revolution | Honor | |
| 2015 | Christopher Paul Curtis | The Madman of Piney Woods | Recommended | |
| 2015 | Tracy Holczer | The Secret Hum of a Daisy | Recommended | |
| 2015 | Natalie Lloyd | A Snicker of Magic | Recommended | |
| 2015 | Loren Long | Otis and the Scarecrow | Recommended | |
| 2015 | Naomi Shihab Nye | The Turtle of Oman | Recommended | |
| 2015 | Megan Jean Sovern | The Meaning of Maggie | Recommended | |
| 2015 | Ashley Spires | The Most Magnificent Thing | Recommended | |
| 2016 | Sharon M. Draper | Stella by Starlight | Winner | |
| 2016 | Jennifer Richard Jacobson | Paper Things | Honor | |
| 2016 | Loren Long | Little Tree | Honor | |
| 2016 | Lisa Mantchev, illus. by Taeeun Yoo | Strictly No Elephants | Honor | |
| 2016 | Susan Lynn Meyer, illus. by Eric Velasquez | New Shoes | Honor | |
| 2016 | Mitali Perkins, illus. by Jamie Hogan | Tiger Boy | Honor | |
| 2016 | Katherine Applegate | Crenshaw | Recommended | |
| 2016 | Cassie Beasley | Circus Mirandus | Recommended | |
| 2016 | Jairo Buitrago, illus. by Rafael Yockteng, trans. by Elisa Amado | Two White Rabbits | Recommended | |
| 2016 | Mike Curato | Little Elliot, Big Family | Recommended | |
| 2016 | Matt de la Peña, illus. by Christian Robinson | Last Stop on Market Street | Recommended | |
| 2016 | Kate DiCamillo, illus. by Chris Van Dusen | Francine Poulet Meets the Ghost Raccoon: Tales from Deckawoo Drive, Volume Two | Recommended | |
| 2016 | Alex Gino | Melissa | Recommended | |
| 2016 | JonArno Lawson, illus. by Sydney Smith | Sidewalk Flowers | Recommended | |
| 2017 | Jason Reynolds | Ghost | Winner | |
| 2017 | John David Anderson | Ms. Bixby’s Last Day | Honor | |
| 2017 | Kelly Barnhill | The Girl Who Drank the Moon | Honor | |
| 2017 | Peter Brown | The Wild Robot | Honor | |
| 2017 | J.J. Austrian, Illus. by Mike Curato | Worm Loves Worm | Honor | |
| 2017 | Eric and Terry Fan | The Night Gardener | Honor | |
| 2017 | Terry Farish, Illus. by Oliver Dominguez | Luis Paints the World | Recommended | |
| 2017 | Adam Gidwitz, illus. by Hatem Aly | The Inquisitor’s Tale: Or, The Three Magical Children and Their Holy Dog | Recommended | |
| 2017 | Nadia Hashimi | One Half from the East | Recommended | |
| 2017 | Deborah Hopkinson | A Bandit’s Tale: The Muddled Misadventures of a Pickpocket | Recommended | |
| 2017 | Lita Judge | Hoot and Peep | Recommended | |
| 2017 | Kate Messner | The Seventh Wish | Recommended | |
| 2017 | Duncan Tonatiuh | The Princess and the Warrior: A Tale of Two Volcanoes | Recommended | |
| 2017 | Lauren Wolk | Wolf Hollow | Recommended | |
| 2018 | Dan Santat | After the Fall: How Humpty Dumpty Got Back Up Again | Winner | |
| 2018 | Caela Carter | Forever or a Long Long Time | Honor | |
| 2018 | Carmen Agra Deedy, illus. by Eugene Yelchin | The Rooster Who Would Not Be Quiet | Honor | |
| 2018 | Stephanie Graegin | Little Fox in the Forest | Honor | |
| 2018 | Alan Gratz | Refugee | Honor | |
| 2018 | Nicole Lea Helget | The End of the Wild | Honor | |
| 2018 | Katherine Applegate, illus. by Charles Santoso | Wishtree | Recommended | |
| 2018 | Derrick Barnes, Illus. by Gordon C. James | Crown: An Ode to the Fresh Cut | Recommended | |
| 2018 | Elisha Cooper | Big Cat, Little Cat | Recommended | |
| 2018 | Celine Clair, illus. by Quin Leng | Shelter | Recommended | |
| 2018 | Paul Griffin | Saving Marty | Recommended | |
| 2018 | Victoria Jamieson | All’s Faire in Middle School | Recommended | |
| 2018 | Hena Khan | Amina’s Voice | Recommended | |
| 2018 | Jennifer Torres | Stef Soto, The Taco Queen | Recommended | |
| 2019 | Jonathan Auxier | Sweep: The Story of a Girl and her Monster | Winner | |
| 2019 | Nicola Davies, illus. by Rebecca Cobb | The Day War Came | Honor | |
| 2019 | Tracy Holczer | Everything Else in the Universe | Honor | |
| 2019 | Irene Latham, Charles Waters, Sean Qualls, and Selina Alko | Can I Touch Your Hair?: Poems of Race, Mistakes, and Friendship | Honor | |
| 2019 | Meg Medina | Merci Suárez Changes Gear | Honor | |
| 2019 | Jewell Parker Rhodes | Ghost Boys | Honor | |
| 2019 | Ashley Herring Blake | Ivy Aberdeen's Letter to the World | Recommended | |
| 2019 | Cori Doerrfeld | The Rabbit Listened | Recommended | |
| 2019 | Susan Hood | Lifeboat 12 | Recommended | |
| 2019 | Kerascoët | I Walk with Vanessa: A Story About a Simple Act of Kindness | Recommended | |
| 2019 | Minh Lê, illus. by Dan Santat | Drawn Together | Recommended | |
| 2019 | Juana Martinez-Neal | Alma and How She Got Her Name | Recommended | |
| 2019 | Chad Sell | The Cardboard Kingdom | Recommended | |
| 2019 | Jacqueline Woodson, illus. by Rafael López | The Day You Begin | Recommended | |
| 2020 | Kate and Jol Temple, Illus. by Terri Rose Baynton | Room on Our Rock | Winner | |
| 2020 | Jerry Craft | New Kid | Honor | |
| 2020 | Christine Day | I Can Make This Promise | Honor | |
| 2020 | Kyle Lukoff, illus. by Kaylani Juanita | When Aidan Became a Brother | Honor | |
| 2020 | Mitali Perkins, illus. by Sara Palacios | Between Us and Abuela: A Family Story from the Border | Honor | |
| 2020 | Jazmine Warga | Other Words for Home | Honor | |
| 2020 | Mariama J. Lockington | For Black Girls Like Me | Recommended | |
| 2020 | Kevin Noble Maillard, illus. by Juana Martinez-Neal | Fry Bread: A Native American Family Story | Recommended | |
| 2020 | Kwame Mbalia | Tristan Strong Punches a Hole in the Sky | Recommended | |
| 2020 | Wendy Meddour, illus. by Daniel Egnéus | Lubna and Pebble | Recommended | |
| 2020 | Ibtihaj Muhammad, illus. by Hatem Aly, with S. K. Ali | The Proudest Blue: A Story of Hijab and Family | Recommended | |
| 2020 | Nicole Panteleakos | Planet Earth Is Blue | Recommended | |
| 2020 | Aida Salazar | The Moon Within | Recommended | |
| 2020 | Jamie Sumner | Roll With It | Recommended | |
| 2021 | Derrick D. Barnes, illus by Gordon C. James | I Am Every Good Thing | Winner | |
| 2021 | Phil Bildner | A High Five for Glenn Burke | Honor | |
| 2021 | Victoria Jamieson and Omar Mohamed | When Stars Are Scattered | Honor | |
| 2021 | Carole Lindstrom, illus. by Michaela Goade | We Are Water Protectors | Honor | |
| 2021 | Jess Redman | Quintessence | Honor | |
| 2021 | Aida Salazar | Land of the Cranes | Honor | |
| 2021 | Anne Blankman | The Blackbird Girls | Recommended | |
| 2021 | Ernesto Cisneros | Efrén Divided | Recommended | |
| 2021 | Tae Keller | When You Trap a Tiger | Recommended | |
| 2021 | Aya Khalil, illus. by Anait Semirdzhyan | The Arabic Quilt: An Immigrant Story | Recommended | |
| 2021 | Pete Oswald | Hike | Recommended | |
| 2021 | Suzanne Selfors and Walker Ranson | Braver: A Wombat's Tale | Recommended | |
| 2021 | Renée Watson | Ways to Make Sunshine | Recommended | |
| 2021 | Maryrose Wood | Alice’s Farm: A Rabbit's Tale | Recommended | |
| 2022 | Kaela Rivera | Cece Rios and the Desert of Souls | Winner | |
| 2022 | Laura Amy, illus. by Julia Iredale | Amber and Clay | Honor | |
| 2022 | Shelly Anand, illus. by Nabi H. Ali | Laxmi’s Mooch | Honor | |
| 2022 | J. Dillard, illus. by Akeem S. Roberts | J. D. and the Great Barber Battle | Honor | |
| 2022 | Lisa Fipps | Starfish | Honor | |
| 2022 | Dawn Quigley, illus. by Tara Audibert | Jo Jo Makoons: The Used-to-Be-Best Friend | Honor | |
| 2022 | Marie Arnold | The Year I Flew Away | Recommended | |
| 2022 | Melissa Iwai | Dumplings for Lili | Recommended | |
| 2022 | Thomas King, illus. by Natasha Donovan | Borders | Recommended | |
| 2022 | Elle McNicoll | A Kind of Spark | Recommended | |
| 2022 | Claudia Mills | The Lost Language | Recommended | |
| 2022 | Sara Pennypacker, illus. by Jon Klassen | Pax, Journey Home | Recommended | |
| 2022 | Emma Otheguy, illus. by Ana Ramírez González | A Sled for Gabo | Recommended | |
| 2022 | Lisa Wheeler, illus. by Loren Long | Someone Builds the Dream | Recommended | |
| 2023 | Dayna Lorentz | Wayward Creatures | Winner | |
| 2023 | Dhonielle Clayton | The Marvellers | Honor | |
| 2023 | Hena Khan, illus. by Wastana Haikal | Zara’s Rules for Record-Breaking Fun | Honor | |
| 2023 | Laurel Goodluck, illus. by Jonathan Nelson | Forever Cousins | Honor | |
| 2023 | Sara Greenwood, illus. by Luisa Uribe | My Brother Is Away | Honor | |
| 2023 | Charlotte Sullivan Wild, illus. by Charlene Chua | Love, Violet | Honor | |
| 2023 | Stephen Briseño, illus. by Magdalena Mora | The Notebook Keeper | Recommended | |
| 2023 | Raul Colon | Draw | Recommended | |
| 2023 | Lindsay Eagar | The Patron Thief of Bread | Recommended | |
| 2023 | C.C. Harrington | Wildoak | Recommended | |
| 2023 | Kelly Starling Lyons, illus. by Tonya Engel | My Hands Tell a Story | Recommended | |
| 2023 | Sandra Nickel, illus. by Il Sung Na | Big Bear and Little Fish | Recommended | |
| 2023 | Naomi Shihab Nye | The Turtle of Michigan | Recommended | |
| 2023 | Kathryn Ormsbee, illus. by Molly Brooks | Growing Pangs | Recommended | |
| 2023 | Young Vo | Gibberish | Recommended | |
| 2024 | Sarah Everett | The Probability of Everything | Winner | |
| 2024 | Ellen Oh, ed. | You Are Here | Honor | |
| 2024 | Charles Waters and Traci Sorell | Mascot | Honor | |
| 2024 | Carole Lindstrom, illus. by Steph Littlebird | My Powerful Hair | Honor | |
| 2024 | Judith Valdés B., illus. by Carlos Vélez Aguilera | An Ofrenda for Perro | Honor | |
| 2024 | Tameka Fryer Brown, illus. by Nikkolas Smith | That Flag | Honor | |
| 2024 | Matt Tavares, illus. by Matt Tavares | Hoops | Recommended | |
| 2024 | Vicki Johnson, illus. by Gillian Reid | Molly's Tuxedo | Recommended | |
| 2024 | Jesus Trejo, illus. by Eliza Kinkz | Papá's Magical Water-Jug Clock | Recommended | |
| 2024 | Alyssa Reynoso-Morris, illus. by Mariyah Rahman | Plátanos Are Love | Recommended | |
| 2024 | Chad Otis | The Bright Side | Recommended | |
| 2024 | Katherine Marsh | The Lost Year | Recommended | |
| 2024 | Raj Haldar, illus. by Julia Patton | This Book Is Banned | Recommended | |
| 2024 | Jack Briglio, illus. by Claudia Dávila | ThunderBoom | Recommended | |
| 2025 | Antwan Eady, illus. by Jarrett & Jerome Pumphrey | The Last Stand | Winner | |
| 2025 | Lisa Fipps | And Then, Boom! | Honor | |
| 2025 | Nadia Sammurtok, illus. by Simji Park | Dad, I Miss You | Honor | |
| 2025 | Rob Harrell | Popcorn | Honor | |
| 2025 | Cynthia Harmony, illus. by Devon Holzwarth | A Flicker of Hope: A Story of Migration | Honor | |
| 2025 | Andrea Wang | Summer at Squee | Honor | |
| 2025 | Mae Respicio | Isabel in Bloom | Recommended | |
| 2025 | Ann Clare LeZotte | Deer Run Home | Recommended | |
| 2025 | Julie Thompson, illus. by Leah Giles | When Isaac Hears the Rain | Recommended | |
| 2025 | Winsome Bingham, illus. by Rahele Jomepour Bell | Missing Momma | Recommended | |
| 2025 | Ani DiFranco, illus. by Rachelle Baker | Show Up and Vote | Recommended | |
| 2025 | Jessixa Bagley, illus. by Aaron Bagley | Duel | Recommended | |
| 2025 | Adria Quinones, illus. by Mrinali Alvarez | Mi Tierra | Recommended | |
| 2025 | Debbie Zapata, illus. by Alejandra Ruiz | Abuela's Letter | Recommended | |
| 2026 | María Dolores Águila | A Sea of Lemon Trees: The Corrido of Roberto Alvarez | Winner | |
| 2026 | Kate Messner | The Trouble with Heroes | Honor | |
| 2026 | Renée Watson | All the Blues in the Sky | Honor | |
| 2026 | Arree Chung | Don't Cause Trouble | Honor | |
| 2026 | Kobina Commeh, illus. by Bárbara Quintino | Kwesi and Nana Ruby Learn to Swim | Honor | |
| 2026 | Uje Brandelius, illus. by Clara Dackenberg | The Playdate | Honor | |
| 2026 | Lana Button and Eric Walters, illus. by Isabelle Malenfant | One Can | Recommended | |
| 2026 | Olivia Abtahi, illus. by Monica Arnaldo | The Interpreter | Recommended | |
| 2026 | Mariahadessa Ekere Tallie, illus. by Aaron Becker | We Go Slow | Recommended | |
| 2026 | James E. Ransome | A Place for Us | Recommended | |
| 2026 | Andrea Landry, illus. by Isabella Fassler | Rez Kid | Recommended | |
| 2026 | Paloma Angelina Lopez, illus. by Abraham Matias | Popo the Xolo | Recommended | |
| 2026 | Katie Mazeika | Maybe Just Ask Me! | Recommended | |
| 2026 | Taraneh Matloob, illus. by Alida Massari | Dear New Friend | Recommended | |
