= Rip and Red =

Children's book series by Phil Bildner

Rip and Red is a middle-grade children's book series written by Phil Bildner, illustrated by Tim Probert, and published by Farrar, Straus and Giroux. The series consists of four books: A Whole New Ball Game (2015), Rookie of the Year (2016), Tournament of Champions (2017), and Most Valuable Players (2018). All four books are Junior Library Guild selections.

The title characters are fifth-grade students Mason "Rip" Irving and his best friend, Blake "Red" Daniels; Rip is an African American who loves playing basketball, while Red is autistic and a great free-throw shooter.

== Overview ==
No.	Title	Publication date	Page No.	ISBN
1	A Whole New Ball Game	August 18, 2015	256	9780374301309
2	Rookie of the Year	July 12, 2016	272	9780374301347
3	Tournament of Champions	June 6, 2017	256	9780374305079
4	Most Valuable Players	May 29, 2018	240	9780374305109

== A Whole New Ball Game (2015) ==
A Whole New Ballgame was published August 18, 2015.

School Library Journal called the book "[p]ure fun with a lot of heart." Kirkus Reviews noted that the "[c]artoony illustrations lend energy and personality to the likable cast of characters," making it a "school story with heart." Publishers Weekly and the Children’s Book Council also proffered positive reviews.

Accolades for A Whole New Ballgame
Year	Accolade	Result	Ref.
N/A	Junior Library Guild	Selection	
2015	Cybils Awards for Middle Grade Fiction	Nominee	
2016	Children's Book Council Notable Social Studies Trade Books for Young People, 3–5	Selection	
2016-2017	Maine Student Book Award	Nominee	
2017	Rhode Island Children's Book Award	Nominee	
2017-2018	Virginia Readers Choice (Elementary)	Nominee	
2017-2018	Sunshine State Young Readers Award	Nominee	
2018	Nutmeg Book Award Intermediate	Nominee	
2018-2019	Oregon Battle of the Books	Nominee	

== Rookie of the Year (2016) ==
Rookie of the Year was published July 12, 2016.

Both Kirkus Reviews and School Library Journal lauded Bildner's characters in Rookie of the Year.

Accolades for Rookie of the Year
Year	Accolade	Result	Ref.
N/A	Junior Library Guild	Selection	
2017	Center for Children's Books Notable Social Studies Trade Books for Young People, 6–8	Selection	
2018-2019	Young Hoosier Book Award	Nominee	

== Tournament of Champions (2017) ==
Tournament of Champions was published June 6, 2017. The book received a positive review from Kirkus and is a Junior Library Guild selection.

== Most Valuable Players (2018) ==
Most Valuable Players was published May 29, 2018. The book is a Junior Library Guild selection.
