= Kaylani Juanita =

Illustrator

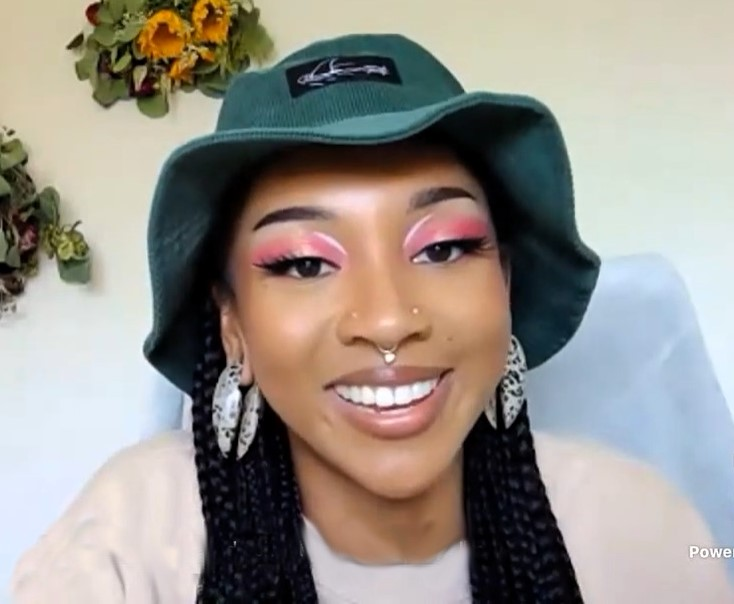
- Juanita in 2021.
- Born: Kaylani Juanita McCard
- Occupation: Illustrator

Kaylani Juanita McCard, professionally known as Kaylani Juanita, is an illustrator. Her work focuses on activism, empowerment of people of color, and LGBTQ+ people. Her work has appeared in publications through Chronicle Books, Cicada Magazine, and Lee & Low Books. Her first book illustrated, Ta-Da! by Kathy Ellen Davis, was released by Chronicle Books and nominated for an Young Readers award via the 38th Annual Northern California Book Awards. In 2018, ELLE Magazine featured her work and interviewed her at length in context of her memorial illustrations based on the murder of Nia Wilson, a black woman who was fatally stabbed in a suspected hate crime while exiting a BART train. In 2017, she illustrated "9 Books for Woke Kids," an article by Guinevere de la Mare.

== Education ==
Juanita attended B. Gale Wilson Elementary School in Solano County's Fairfield-Suisun Unified School District as well as Rodriguez High School. While attending Rodriguez, Juanita spent a summer studying at CalArts. She then attended Solano College before transferring to California College of the Arts. She earned her BFA in Illustration from California College of the Arts. As of 2019, she is working on a Master's in Design at the University of California, Davis.

== Personal life ==
Juanita is based in Fairfield, CA and identifies as a mixed-race femme queer person.

== Awards and honors ==
=== When Aiden Became A Brother ===
Kaylani Jaunita and Kyle Lukoff published When Aiden Became a Brother in 2019. In 2020, the book was awarded the Stonewall Children’s and Young Adult Literature Award, landed a top spot on the American Library Association Rainbow List, and was named a Charlotte Huck Award Honor Book.

== Bibliography ==
- Next Level: A Hymn in Gratitude for Neurodiversity by Samara Cole Doyon, illustrated by Kaylani Juanita (2024)
- Loud and Proud: The Life of Congresswoman Shirley Chishom by Lesa Cline-Ransome, illustrated by Kaylani Juanita (2023)
- Together We Swim by Valerie Bolling, illustrated by Kaylani Juanita (2023)
- Together We Ride by Valerie Bolling, illustrated by Kaylani Juanita (2022)
- A House for Every Bird by Megan Maynor, illustrated by Kaylani Juanita, (2021)
- Magnificent Homespun Brown by Samara Cole Doyon, illustrated by Kaylani Juanita (2020)
- When Aidan Became a Brother by Kyle Lukoff, illustrated by Kaylani Juanita (2019)
- Watch Us Rise by Reneé Watson & Ellen Hagan, illustrated by Kaylani Juanita (2019)
- Ta-Da! by Kathy Ellen Davis, illustrated by Kaylani Juanita (2018)

== Podcasts ==
- The Creativity Habit
