= Luciano Lozano =

- Born: Luciano Lozano Raya; 1969; La Línea de la Concepción, Cádiz, Spain
- Occupation(s): Author, graphic artist, and illustrator

Luciano Lozano Raya, known professionally as Luciano Lozano, (born 1969) is a Spanish author, graphic artist, and illustrator based in Barcelona. His work has appeared in newspapers, magazines, and books including CondéNast Traveller (Emirates), Brightly Magazine (US), El Costurero Magazine (Spain), Libelle (Netherlands), Le Monde (France), Ling Magazine (Spain), Sunday Times Travel (UK), The Mail on Sunday (UK), The Guardian (UK), Bulletin Magazine (UK), Kireei Magazine (Spain), and Gentlemen’s Journal (UK).

== Personal life ==
Lozano was born in La Línea de la Concepción, Cádiz, Spain and lived many years in Benalmádena, Málaga. He currently lives between Sant Boi de LLobregat, Barcelona, and Benalmádena, Málaga.

== Education ==
Lozano is a self-taught artist. He eventually completed a postgraduate course in creative illustration at EINA, Barcelona in 2007, launching him into his career.

== Career ==
Lozano's work is found in newspapers, magazines, and books; various illustrations have appeared in La Marea, The Guardian, Público, House and Garden, and Le Monde. He's published many children's books with Thames and Hudson, Walkers books, Penguin Random House, Abrams Kids, and in Spain A buen Paso, Tres tigres tristes, Akiara books and Flamboyant among others.

== Awards and honors ==
- Moonbeam Children’s Book Award, Silver Medal
- El Dragón Lector Award for Best Illustrated Children’s Book, 2015
- BuzzFeed Best Picture Books of 2015 listee
- Catalonian Association of Illustrators (APIC)'s Junceda Award for Best 2011/2012 Foreign Book

== Bibliography ==
=== As author and illustrator ===
- "La casa de la noche", Tres tigres tristes, (2022)
- "Bea y el ballet", Tres tigres tristes, (2021)
- "Tancho", Akiara Books, (2021) Shortlisted for Andersen prize, Italy 2023
- Mayhem at the Museum: A Book in Pictures, Penguin Workshop/Penguin Random House, (2020)
- Diana Dances, Annick Press, 2019
- Sirena de piedra, Tres tigres tristes, (2019)
- Bea baila, Tres tigres tristes, (2017)

=== As illustrator ===
- "Santiago saw things differently" by Christine Iverson, Candlewick Press, (2021)
- "The worst sleepover in the world" by Sophie Dahl, Walker Books, (2021)
- "Jean-Michel Basquiat" by María Isabel Sánchez Vergara, Alba Editorial, Quarto, (2021)
- Ciao Sandro by Steven Barni, Abrams Books, (2021)
- American Ballet Boys dance by John Robert Allman, Penguin Random House, (2020)
- Max and Friends series by Kyle Lukoff, Reycraft Books, (2019)
- Brilliant Ideas From Wonderful Women: 15 Incredible Inventions from Inspiring Women! by Aitziber Lopez, Wide Eyed Editions, (2019)
- The Sun Shines Everywhere by Mary Ann Hoberman, Little Brown Books for Young Readers, (2019)
- When Neil Armstrong Built a Wind Tunnel by Mark Weakland, Capstone Press/Picture Window Books (2018)
- Flower Land by Mia Cassany, Mosquito Books, (2017)
- Miles of Smiles by Karen Kaufman Orloff, Sterling Children's Books, (2016)
- I (Don't) Like Snakes by Nicola Davies, Candlewick Press, (2015)
- Mr. H by Daniel Nesquens, Eerdmans Books for Young Readers, (2015)
- Operation Alphabet by Al MacCuish, Thames & Hudson, (2011)
