= Marvelous Cornelius =

2015 children's book

- Author: Phil Bildner
- Illustrator: John Parra
- Publisher: Chronicle Books
- Publication date: August 4, 2015
- Pages: 44
- ISBN: 978-1-452-12578-7

Marvelous Cornelius: Hurricane Katrina and the Spirit of New Orleans is a semi-biographical picture book written by Phil Bildner, illustrated by John Parra, and published August 4, 2015 by Chronicle Books. The book, which is based on a true story, follows Cornelius after he cleans up New Orleans after Hurricane Katrina.

== Reception ==
Marvelous Cornelius was met with praise, applauding the message of the impact of individuals' efforts. While some reviews discussed how the book served as a "stirring story of resilience in the face of adversity" or a "fine tribute to an unsung African-American hero," others noted that the book "[e]mphasize[d] the vibrant life before Hurricane Katrina and makes the impact of the terrible flood."

Marvelous Cornelius received a starred review from Shelf Awareness, as well as positive reviews from Kirkus, School Library Journal, Booklist, and USA Today.

The book is a Junior Library Guild selection. In 2016, Bank Street College of Education named it one of the year's best children's books, the Children's Book Council's included it on their list of Notable Social Studies Trade Books for Young People, K–2, and the International Literacy Association included it on their Teacher's Choices Reading List. In 2018, the Association of Indiana School Library Educators included it on their "Read Alouds Too-Good-To-Miss" list.

Beyond popular media, Marvelous Cornelius has also been discussed in academic circles to review the stories told to children about working-class Americans and tragedy.

Accolades for Marvelous Cornelius
Year	Accolade	Result	Ref.
2015	Cybils Award for Fiction Picture Books	Nominee	
2015	Parents' Choice Book Awards for Picture Books	Gold	
2016	Golden Kite Award for Picture Book Illustration	Winner	
2016	Margaret Wise Brown Prize in Children's Literature	Winner	
2017–2018	Georgia Picture Book Award (K-4)	Nominee	
2018	Louisiana Young Readers Choice Award, Grades 3–5	Nominee	
