= Rick (novel) =

2020 novel by Alex Gino

- First edition cover
- Author: Alex Gino
- Publisher: Scholastic
- Publication date: April 21, 2020
- ISBN: 978-1338048100
- Preceded by: Melissa
- Followed by: Green

Rick is a 2020 children's novel by Alex Gino. A stand-alone follow-up to Gino's 2015 novel Melissa, it follows Rick, a middle school boy who comes to terms with both his toxic friendship with a bully and his own aromantic asexual identity after he joins a club for LGBTQIAP+ kids at his school.

== Plot ==
The book takes place two years after the events of Melissa, where the character Rick Ramsey appeared as a minor antagonist and sidekick to the bully Jeff. Now attending sixth grade, Rick is still friends with Jeff, but the way Jeff cruelly bullies other students, makes sexist or homophobic remarks, and mocks Rick's interest in the sci-fi television series Rogue Space has made Rick start to question their friendship. When a curious Rick joins the Rainbow Spectrum, a club for LGBTQIAP+ and ally students, without Jeff's knowledge, he finds himself making new friends, including Melissa from the previous book. Rick apologies to Melissa for how he treated her in the past. He also starts questioning his identity before coming to the realization that he is aromantic and asexual. When Jeff then doubles down on his abrasive behavior and starts harassing the Rainbow Spectrum, Rick is forced to confront if he really wants to still be friends with Jeff.

== Reception ==
Kirkus Reviews, Booklist, School Library Journal, and Publishers Weekly all gave Rick starred reviews. Multiple reviewers noted how Gino introduced LGBTQ+ terminology and concepts from the perspective of newcomer Rick. BookTrust called the book an "excellent and much-needed book for children who, like Rick, might not know too much about the world of LGBTQIAP+ to begin with." Adam McConville of The Bulletin of the Center for Children's Books gave a more mixed review, regarding the supporting cast as underdeveloped and criticizing the "didactic exposition and forced dialogue," but positively commenting on Rick's redemption. It was also included in Kirkus Reviews' Best Middle Grade Books of the Year.

Reviewing the audiobook, also narrated by Alex Gino, Kirkus Reviews said that "Gino's expressive narration brims with warmth and empathy for their middle school characters, and their careful pacing makes it easy to understand who's speaking."

== Censorship and challenges ==
In 2026, the book was removed from schools in Katy Indenpendent School District in Texas in response to Texas Senate Bill 12 and Texas Senate Bill 13. It was also considered for removal in Fauquier County in Virginia and was challenged in Indiana. A 2026 list by the American Library Association's Office for Intellectual Freedom listed it as the 131st most challenged book since it began tracking data.
