= Phil Bildner =

American author of children's books

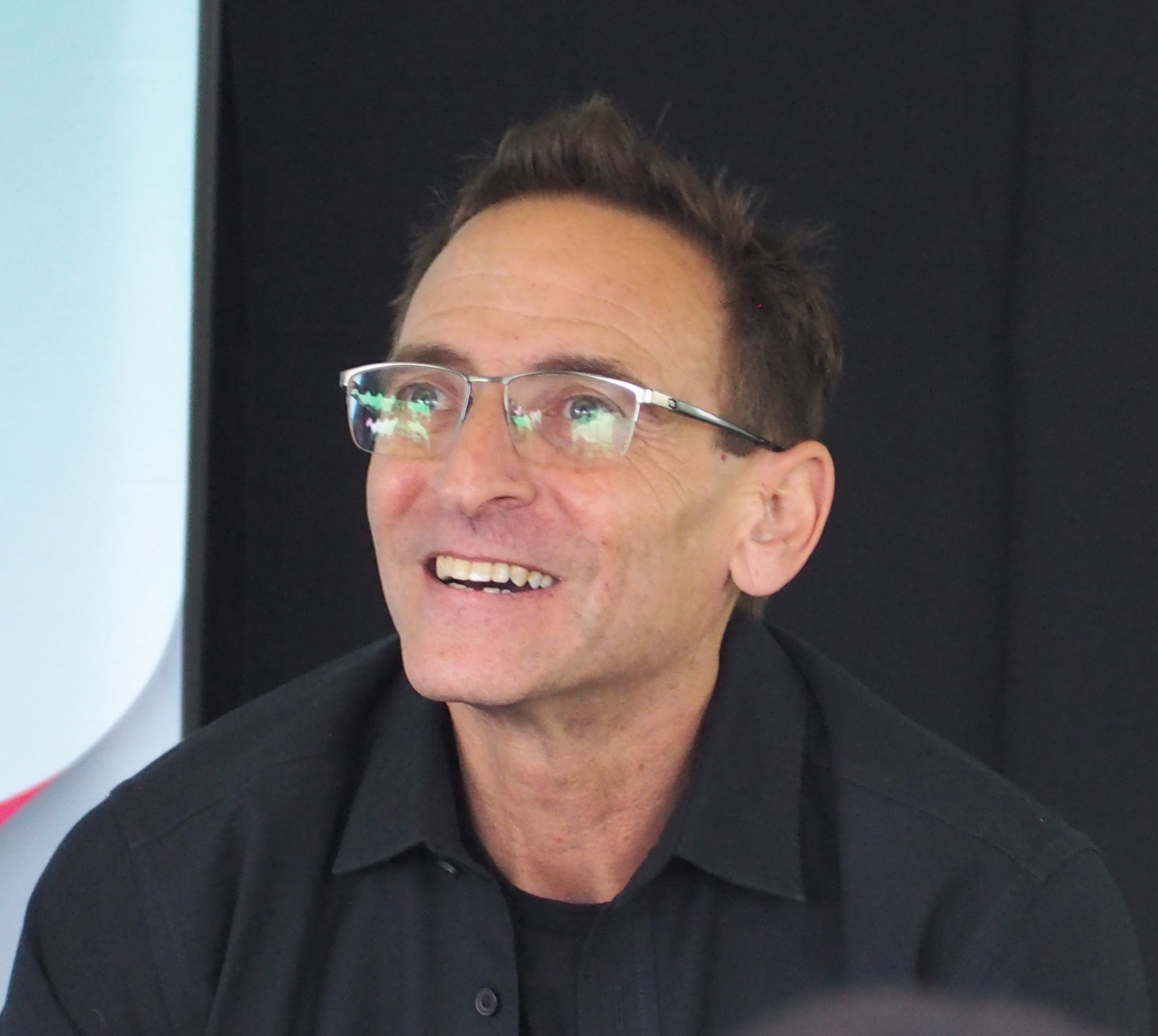
- Education: Johns Hopkins University (BA, 1990); New York University School of Law (JD, 1993); Long Island University (Master's, 1995)
- Notable works: Rip and Red (2015–2018); Marvelous Cornelius (2015)

Phil Bildner is an American author of children's books. Among author works, he is the author of the Rip and Red book series, Marvelous Cornelius (2015), and A High Five for Glenn Burke (2020).

== Personal life ==
Bildner grew up in Jericho, New York and currently lives in Newburgh, New York with his husband and his dog, Kat.

== Education ==
Bildner attended Johns Hopkins University and graduated with a bachelor of arts degree in political science in 1990, after which he attended New York University School of Law and received a Juris Doctor degree in 1993. He passed the bar exam in New York and New Jersey before beginning his career in law.

After a working as a lawyer for a short time, Bildner returned to school and received a master's degree in early childhood education and elementary education from Long Island University in 1995.

== Career ==
After passing his bar exam, Bildner worked for a law firm in Manhattan short term.

After receiving his master's degree in education, Bildner taught in the New York Public Schools for eleven years, where he taught primarily fifth- and sixth-grade students. In the 1990s, while teaching in the Tremont section of the Bronx, he developed an English-Language Arts (ELA) curriculum around song and music, through which he invited Dave Matthews, Barenaked Ladies, Blues Traveler, Lauryn Hill, and Wyclef Jean into his classroom. While in that school district, Bildner also created a curriculum around HIV/AIDS.

In the 2000s, Bilder started work at P.S. 333, the Manhattan School for Children in Upper Manhattan. Teaching middle school English and American History, Bildner continued to incorporate music into the curriculum and worked with the Lincoln Center Institute, Broadway shows (e.g., Wicked and The 25th Annual Putnam County Spelling Bee), and Off-Broadway shows (e.g., Def Poetry Jam, De la Guarda).

In 2005, Bildner left the classroom to write full-time.

However, he began chaperoning student volunteer trips to New Orleans to help victims in the aftermath of Hurricane Katrina. Through these efforts, he founded NOLA Tree, "a non-profit youth service organization and served as the co-Executive Director."

In 2017, Bildner founded The Author Village to help connect students to authors, artists, and other creative individuals. Through this organization, he visits 50–60 schools annually.

== Selected works ==
=== Rip and Red series (2015–2018) ===
The Rip and Red series, illustrated by Tim Probert and published by Farrar, Straus and Giroux, consists of four books: A Whole New Ball Game (2015), Rookie of the Year (2016), Tournament of Champions (2017), and Most Valuable Players (2018). All four books are Junior Library Guild selections.

=== Marvelous Cornelius (2015) ===
Marvelous Cornelius: Hurricane Katrina and the Spirit of New Orleans is a semi-biographical picture book illustrated by John Parra, and published August 4, 2015 by Chronicle Books.

Alongside being a Junior Library Guild selection, the book received various accolades, including the following:

- Golden Kite Award for Picture Book Illustration (2016)
- Bank Street College of Education Best Books of 2016
- Cybils Award for Fiction Picture Books nominee (2015)

=== Martina and Chrissie (2017) ===
Martina and Chrissie: The Greatest Rivalry in the History of Sports, illustrated by Brett Helquist and published May 14, 2019 by Candlewick Press, provides a dual biography of tennis players Martina Navratilova and Chris Evert.

The book received a starred review from Booklist, who said the "spirited, engrossing story, containing an inspiring message and enough information for the fact hungry, is a fantastic addition to all sports collections." Publishers Weekly and Sports Illustrated Kids also provided positive reviews. School Library Journal and Kirkus, however, offered a mediocre review, the latter stating it was "a fine sports story," noting that "the hyperbolic tone" of referring to this relationship as "the greatest rivalry in the history of sports" "mars an otherwise superb sports volume."

Alongside being selected by the Junior Library Guild, Martina and Chrissie received the following accolades:

- Booklist Top 10 Books for Youth, Sports (2017)
- Chicago Public Library Best Informational Books for Younger Readers (2017)
- Evanston Public Library's 101 Great Children's Books Published in 2017

=== A High Five for Glenn Burke (2020) ===
A High Five for Glenn Burke, published February 25, 2020 by Farrar, Straus and Giroux, is a middle-grade novel about Silas Wade, who learns about Glenn Burke, a gay, Major League baseball player in the 1970s and begins to accept his own sexual identity.

The book received a starred review from Booklist, as well as positive reviews from Kirkus, The Bulletin of the Center for Children's Books, and School Library Journal.

Alongside being selected by the Junior Library Guild, A High Five for Glenn Burke received the following accolades:

- Lambda Literary Award for LGBTQ Children's Literature nominee (2021)
- NCTE Charlotte Huck Award Honor Book (2021)
- Bank Street College of Education Best Book of 2021
- Chicago Public Library Best Fiction for Older Readers (2020)

== Publications ==
=== Sluggers series ===
- Barnstormers Game 1, with Loren Long (2007)
- Barnstormers Game 2, with Loren Long (2007)
- Barnstormers Game 3, with Loren Long (2008)
- Magic in the Outfield (February 2009)
- Horsin' Around (February 2009)
- Great Balls of Fire (April 2009)
- Water, Water Everywhere (April 2009)
- Blastin' the Blues (February 2010)
- Home of the Brave (May 2010)

=== Rip and Red series ===
- A Whole New Ballgame, illustrated by Tim Probert (2015)
- Rookie of the Year, illustrated by Tim Probert (2016)
- Tournament of Champions, illustrated by Tim Probert (2017)
- Most Valuable Players, illustrated by Tim Probert (2018)

=== Standalone books ===
- Shoeless Joe & Black Betsy, illustrated by C. F. Payne (2002)
- Twenty One Elephants, illustrated by LeUyen Pham (2004)
- The Shot Heard 'Round the World (2005)
- The Greatest Game Ever Played, illustrated by Zachary Pullen (2006)
- Playing the Field (2006)
- Busted (2007)
- Turkey Bowl, illustrated by C. F. Payne (2008)
- The Hallelujah Flight, illustrated by John Holyfield (2010)
- The Unforgettable Season: Joe DiMaggio, Ted Williams and the Record-Setting Summer of 1941, illustrated by S.D. Schindler (2011)
- The Soccer Fence: A Story of Friendship, Hope, and Apartheid in South Africa, illustrated by Jesse Joshua Watson (2014)
- Marvelous Cornelius: Hurricane Katrina and the Spirit of New Orleans (2015)
- Derek Jeter Presents: Night at the Stadium, illustrated by Tom Booth (2016)
- Martina and Chrissie: The Greatest Rivalry in the History of Sports, illustrated by Brett Helquist (2017)
- A High Five for Glenn Burke (2020)
