= Kyle Lukoff =

Children's book author (born 1984)

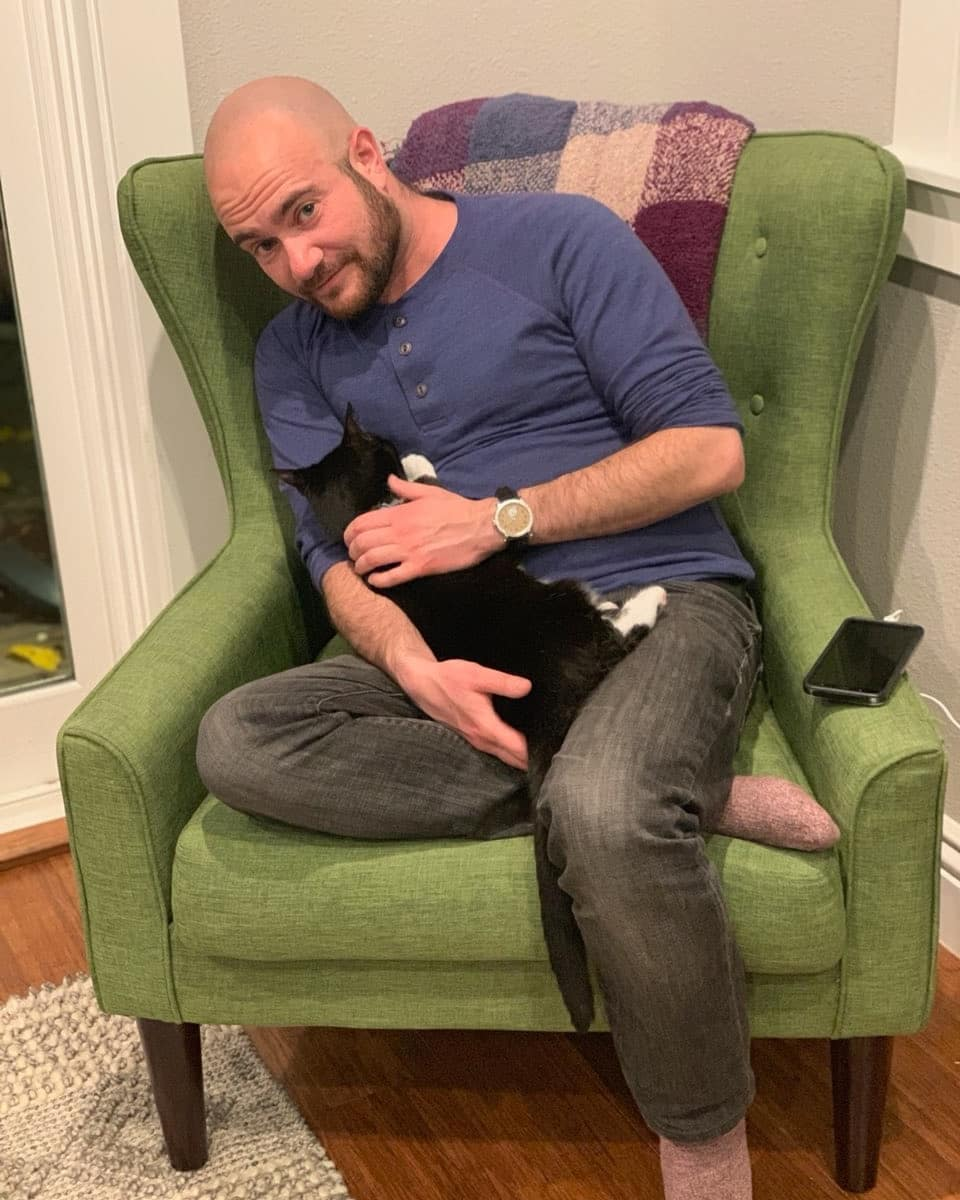
- Born: June 5, 1984 (age 42); Skokie, Illinois, United States
- Education: Barnard College
- Occupation: School librarian
- Writing career
- Notable works: When Aidan Became a Brother, Too Bright to See
- Website: kylelukoff.com

Kyle Lukoff (born 1984) is a children's book author, school librarian, and former bookseller. He is most known for the Stonewall award-winning When Aidan Became a Brother and for Call Me Max, which gained attention when parents in Texas complained about the book being read in an elementary school classroom and a Utah school district canceled its book program after the book was read to third graders.

== Personal life ==
Lukoff is a transgender man, who transitioned in 2004 while an undergraduate at Barnard College, a historically women's college. Much of his work centers on transgender children. He is Jewish.

== Education ==
Lukoff went to Edmonds-Woodway High School then graduated from Barnard College in 2006. While at Barnard, he was a member of Columbia University's Philolexian Society. He earned his Master's degree in library science from Queens College in 2012.

== Career ==
Lukoff was a school librarian at the Corlears School in New York City until he quit his job to write full time in 2020. His first book, A Storytelling of Ravens, was published in 2018 by House of Anansi Press and illustrated by Natalie Nelson. His second book, When Aidan Became a Brother, illustrated by Kaylani Juanita, is a story about a transgender boy awaiting a new sibling. The book was published by Lee & Low, an independent publisher known for works by unpublished authors and illustrators of color.

Lukoff's Max and Friends series was released in November 2019 with Call Me Max, illustrated by Luciano Luzano. In April 2020, he published Explosion at the Poem Factory, which was illustrated by Mark Hoffman. In 2021, he published Too Bright to See, which won the Stonewall award and a Newbery Honor, and was a finalist for the National Book Award for Young People's Literature. He also wrote Different Kinds of Fruit. His 2024 novel A World Worth Saving is a finalist for the National Book Award for Young People's Literature.

== Publications ==
=== Books ===
Title	Year	Notes	Ref.
A Storytelling of Ravens	2018	Illustrated by Natalie Nelson	
When Aidan Became a Brother	2019	Illustrated by Kaylani Juanita	
Explosion at the Poem Factory	2020	Illustrated by Mark Hoffman	
Too Bright to See	2021		
Different Kinds of Fruit	2022		
If You're a Kid Like Gavin	2022	With Gavin Grimm	
Awake, Asleep	2023	Illustrated by Nadia Alam	
There's No Such Thing as Vegetables	2024	Illustrated by Andrea Tsurumi	
I'm Sorry You Got Mad	2024	Illustrated by Julie Kwon	
Just What to Do	2024	Illustrated by Hala Tahboub	
A World Worth Saving	2025		
My Little Golden Book About Pride	2025	Illustrated by Michelle Jing Chan	
Are You a Friend of Dorothy? The True Story of an Imaginary Woman and the Real People She Helped	2025	Illustrated by Levi Hastings	
The Kids in Mrs. Z's Class: Sebastian Metzger Solves a Sticky Situation	2026	Illustrated by Kat Fajardo	
The Vicious Cycle: A Story of Healing	2026	Illustrated by Priscilla Tey	
Should I Stay or Should You Go?	2027		

==== Book series ====
- Max

Title	Year	Notes
Call Me Max	2019	Illustrated by Luciano Lozano
Max and the Talent Show	2019	Illustrated by Luciano Lozano
Max on the Farm	2020	Illustrated by Luciano Lozano

- Mermaid Days

Title	Year	Notes	Ref.
Mermaid Days #1: The Sunken Ship	2022	Illustrated by Kat Uno	
Mermaid Days #2: The Sea Monster	2022	Illustrated by Kat Uno	
Mermaid Days #3: A New Friend	2023	Illustrated by Kat Uno	

=== Essays ===
Title	In	Ref.
"Taking up Space"	Gender Outlaws: The Next Generation	
"Evaluating Transgender Picture Books; Calling for Better Ones"	School Library Journal	
"Second Trans on the Moon"	YA Pride	
"A letter to trans writers who are thinking about trying to get published."		

== Awards ==
Year	Nominee / work	Award	Result	Ref.
2025	Kyle Lukoff	Children's Literature Lecture	Won	
2022	Too Bright to See	Stonewall Children's and Young Adult Literature	Won	
2022	Too Bright to See	Newbery	Honored	
2021	Too Bright to See	National Book Award for Young People's Literature	Finalist	
2020	When Aidan Became a Brother	Stonewall Children's and Young Adult Literature	Won	
2020	Outstanding Fiction for Children	Charlotte Huck Award	Honored	
