= Oregon Battle of the Books =

Trivia-style reading competition

Oregon Battle of the Books (OBOB) is a trivia-style reading competition for students in the U.S. state of Oregon. Students in grades 3 to 12 compete against one another by answering a series of questions about a list of books they are given at the beginning of the year. The list is around 15 books long, and questions are asked of any of the books for that age division in the style of Jeopardy!, an American quiz show.

The preliminary tournament starts off in pool play style tournaments, then the next round is in the style of stepladder or bracket play. Students can choose to participate in the local, district, regional, and state level of the program.

== History ==
The Oregon Battle of the Books Committee is a volunteer-based group established in 2006 and supported by the Oregon Association of School Libraries (OASL). The idea was sparked by the Chicago Public Library, which had a radio show with a similar concept in the mid-20th century. In the 1970s, author Sybilla Cook introduced the idea in Oregon, but it was not until 2006 that it got funding from the State Library of Oregon.

== Regions ==
OBOB Regions by County
Regions	Divisions 3-5	Divisions 6-8	Divisions 9-12
1	Clatsop	Clatsop	Clatsop
	Columbia	Columbia	Columbia
	Tillamook	Tillamook	Tillamook
	Washington	Washington	Washington
2		Marion	Marion
		Linn	Linn
		Yamhill	Yamhill
		Polk	Polk
		Lincoln	Lincoln
		Benton	Benton
2 East	Marion		
	Linn		
2 West	Yamhill		
	Polk		
	Lincoln		
	Benton		
3 North	Lane	Lane	Lane
3 South	Coos	Coos	Coos
	Douglas	Douglas	Douglas
4 North	Multnomah	Multnomah	Multnomah
	Hood River	Hood River	Hood River
4 South	Clackamas	Clackamas	Clackamas
	Wasco	Wasco	Wasco
5	Lake	Lake	Lake
	Klamath	Klamath	Klamath
	Jackson	Jackson	Jackson
	Josephine	Josephine	Josephine
	Curry	Curry	Curry
6	Sherman	Sherman	Sherman
	Gilliam	Gilliam	Gilliam
	Morrow	Morrow	Morrow
	Umatilla	Umatilla	Umatilla
	Union	Union	Union
	Wallowa	Wallowa	Wallowa
	Baker	Baker	Baker
	Malheur	Malheur	Malheur
7	Jefferson	Jefferson	Jefferson
	Deschutes	Deschutes	Deschutes
	Crook	Crook	Crook
	Wheeler	Wheeler	Wheeler
	Grant	Grant	Grant
	Harney	Harney	Harney

== Controversy ==
For the 2018–19 school year, Alex Gino's book George (which has been published under the title Melissa since April 2022) was one of the 16 novels selected for students to read. It is a novel about a 10-year-old transgender girl who goes by the name of Melissa. It is a coming of age novel targeted for students aged 8 to 12. Despite all the praise the book received from its initial release, it was featured two years in a row on the American Library Association's list titled "10 Most Challenged Books" for years 2016 and 2017.

Two school districts, Hermiston School District and Cascade School District, both decided to drop from the competition. They claimed that the content of the book was too mature for the students but mentioned that it had nothing to do with transgender rights.

== See also ==
- List of libraries in Oregon
- Oregon Department of Education
