= Natalie Lloyd =

American children's author

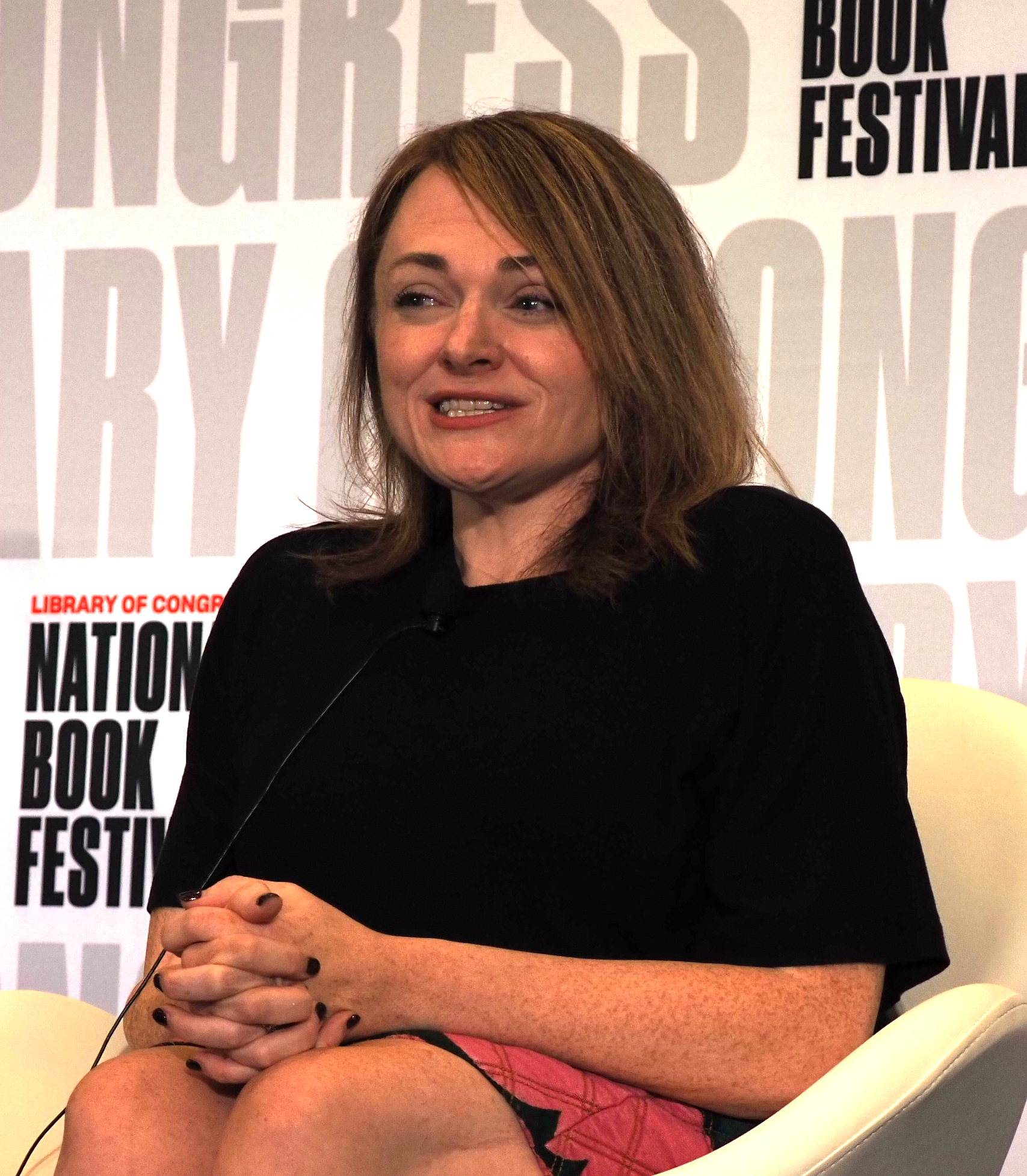
- Born: February 2 Tennessee, U.S.
- Website: natalielloyd.com

Natalie Lloyd (born February 2) is an American children's author.

Lloyd lives in Chattanooga, Tennessee, with her husband and dogs. She was born in Tennessee with a condition called osteogenesis imperfecta, or brittle bone disease, which means she only grew to 4 foot 11 inches tall and used either a walker or a wheelchair until seventh grade. She did a degree in journalism in college.

== Awards and honours ==
Seven of Lloyd's books are Junior Library Guild selections: A Snicker of Magic (2014), A Snicker of Magic audiobook (2014), The Key to Extraordinary (2016), The Key to Extraordinary audiobook (2016), The Problim Children (2018), The Problim Children audiobook (2018), and Hummingbird (2022).

A Snicker of Magic which was a New York Times bestseller. The Los Angeles Public Library and NPR named A Snicker of Magic one of the best children's books of 2014. The following year, Bank Street College of Education included it on their list of the best books for children ages 9–12, marking it as a book of "Outstanding Merit." The Association for Library Service to Children named it a 2015 Notable Books selection.

Bank Street College of Education also included The Key to Extraordinary on their list of the best books of the year for children ages 9–12 in 2017.

Awards for Lloyd's writing
Year	Title	Award	Result	Ref.
2015	A Snicker of Magic	E. B. White Read Aloud Award	Honor	
2015	A Snicker of Magic	Mythopoeic Award for Children's Literature	Winner	
2015	A Snicker of Magic	NCTE Charlotte Huck Award	Recommended	
2015	A Snicker of Magic	Odyssey Award	Honor	
2023	Hummingbird	Schneider Family Book Award Best Middle Grade Book	Honor	

== Bibliography ==
- A Snicker of Magic (2014)
- The Key to Extraordinary (2016)
- Over the Moon (2019)

=== Series ===
- The Problim Children (2018)
- Carnival Catastrophe (2019)
- Island in the Stars (2020)
