= Too Bright to See =

2021 middle grade novel by Kyle Lukoff

- Author: Kyle Lukoff
- Language: English
- Genre: Children's literature; Coming of age; Ghost story
- Publisher: Dial Books
- Publication date: April 20, 2021
- Publication place: United States
- Pages: 192
- ISBN: 978-0-593-11115-4

Too Bright to See is a middle grade ghost novel written by Kyle Lukoff and published on April 20, 2021, by Dial Books. It tells the story of Bug, a transgender boy who lives in a haunted house, as he tries to understand a message a ghost is trying to send him.

Too Bright to See received starred reviews from several outlets, including Kirkus Reviews, Publishers Weekly and School Library Journal, who praised the author's take on gender identities and self-acceptance.

== Reception ==
Kirkus Reviews noted the book's focus on a coming out story from "the perspective of a young person who does not initially know how to identify his discomfort." They also commented on Lukoff's push against gender stereotypes, and called the book "[h]aunting and healing." Publishers Weekly praised the author's "smart and thought-provoking use of the ghost story framework" to talk about the main character's experience as a transgender boy. They concluded by saying "Lukoff provides a tender rumination on grief, love, and identity."

Taylor Worley, who reviewed the book for the School Library Journal, called Lukoff's book "a deeply empathetic exploration of grief and gender identity," and noted that both the ghost story and the overall themes on gender and identity are well written.

Too Bright to See was a Newbery Honor Book and a finalist for the National Book Award in the "Young people's literature" category. The book was the recipient of the Stonewall Book Award in the "Children's and Young Adult" category, alongside Malinda Lo's Last Night at the Telegraph Club.
