= A High Five for Glenn Burke =

2020 middle-grade novel by Phil Bildner

- Author: Phil Bildner
- Language: English
- Published: February 25, 2020
- Media type: Print
- Pages: 288
- ISBN: 978-0-374-31273-2
- OCLC: 1089284174

A High Five for Glenn Burke is a middle-grade novel by Phil Bildner, published February 25, 2020, by Farrar, Straus and Giroux, about Silas Wade, who learns about Glenn Burke, a gay, Major League baseball player in the 1970s and begins to accept his own sexual identity.

== Plot summary ==
Sixth-grader Silas Wade takes the first step toward coming out when he gives a presentation in class about a gay baseball player named Glenn Burke. His second step is confiding to his best friend Zoey, and eventually his coach, that he is gay. Silas soon finds himself stuck in a difficult situation and becomes torn between wanting to hide his identity and channeling the courage to embrace it. The story follows as Silas continues to navigate the struggles—and freedom—of coming out to those around him.

== Reception ==
A High Five for Glenn Burke received a starred review from Booklist, as well as positive reviews from Kirkus, The Bulletin of the Center for Children's Books, and School Library Journal.

Alongside being selected by the Junior Library Guild, A High Five for Glenn Burke received the following accolades:

- Chicago Public Library 2022-2023 Rebecca Caudill Award Nominee
- Lambda Literary Award for LGBTQ Children's Literature (2021)
- NCTE Charlotte Huck Award Honor Book (2021)
- Bank Street College of Education Best Book of 2021
- New York Public Library 100 Best Books for Kids
- Chicago Public Library Best Fiction for Older Readers (2020)

=== Controversy ===
In an interview with Phil Bildner in August 2020, he mentions that he was invited to a school in New Jersey but disinvited "once they learned the book had LGBTQ themes." Bildner has noted that he knows "it won't be the last time it happens."

He hopes parents and schools will continue advocating for books like A High Five for Glenn Burke, especially when they work with middle school students because "[t]hese kids are trying to figure out who they are and where they fit in, and they need to know a book like this exists." He continued, noting that "Tragically, when you erase LGBTQ books and eliminate access to them, you erase these kids and their narratives. And, when you do this, lives are at stake. These kids need to know that their stories and their lives, matter. Teachers and librarians need to be caretakers—not gatekeepers—to create a safe space for all kids."

In 2022 in Texas, parents Paul and Rachel Elliott challenged 280 books, including A High Five for Glenn Burke, and many others containing LGBTQIA+ themes; however, no books were removed from libraries as a result. In August 2023, The Des Moines Register published an article on a list of banned books in an Iowa school district, which included A High Five for Glenn Burke.
