= A Sea of Lemon Trees =

2025 American children's novel

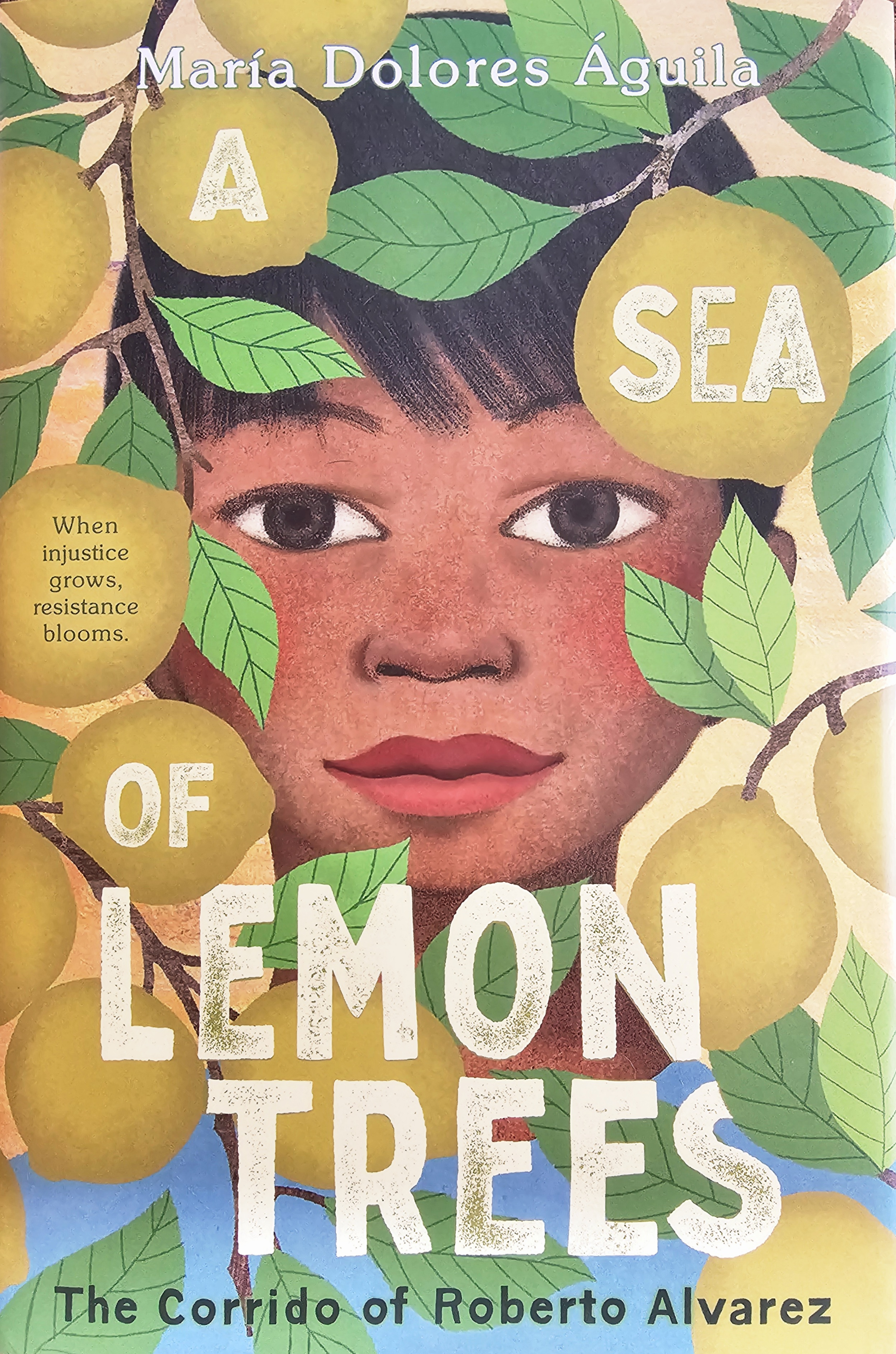
- Author: María Dolores Águila
- Cover artist: Rafael López
- Language: English
- Publisher: Roaring Brook Press
- Publication date: September 16, 2025
- Publication place: United States
- Media type: Print (hardcover)
- Pages: 304
- Awards: Newbery Honor, Charlotte Huck Award, Scott O'Dell Award for Historical Fiction, Jane Addams Children's Book Award
- ISBN: 978-1-250-34261-4

A Sea of Lemon Trees: The Corrido of Roberto Alvarez is a 2025 children's book by María Dolores Águila. Published in 2025 by Roaring Brook Press, and written in free verse, it tells the true experience of the child who was the defendant in Roberto Alvarez vs. the Board of Trustees of the Lemon Grove School District, which arose out of the Lemon Grove Incident. It was well received by critics, and won several literary awards.

== Plot ==
In 1930, American-born Roberto Alvarez was twelve, the youngest of his immigrant family, and a good student at the Lemon Grove grammar school. Amid rising xenophobia, the school board told the children one day that they could no longer attend the school, but would have to go to an inferior school where their desks had already been moved.

The immigrant community organized, obtained help from the Mexican Consulate and procured legal representation. Roberto was chosen as the lead defendant and appeared in court for the case. Against the odds they faced, the ruling came down in their favor: The Mexican students could not be segregated and must be reinstated at the Lemon Grove Grammar School.

== Reception ==
The book has earned several Awards, including: a 2026 Newbery Honor book, the 2026 Charlotte Huck Award for Outstanding Fiction for Children, the 2026 Scott O'Dell Award for Historical Fiction, a 2026 Pura Belpré Award Honor Book, and the 2026 Jane Addams Children's Book Award Chapter Book Winner.

It was a 2025 National Book Award for Young People Longlist Title, a New York Times Best Books for Kids of 2025, a New York Public Library Best Book for Kids of 2025, and a Publishers Weekly Best Books for Middle Grades of 2025.
