= Mariama J. Lockington =

American writer, poet, educator (born 1984)

Mariama J. Lockington (born December 30, 1984) is an American poet, author, educator, advocate and transracial adoptee.

== Early and personal life ==
Lockington was born in Atlanta, Georgia on December 30, 1984. She was flown to Denver, Colorado by a social worker at three weeks old. She is a transracial adoptee, having been raised by white parents. Her adoption was closed. Her parents were open about their troubles with fertility and their desire to have both adoptive and biological children. Her mother told Lockington that in the 1960s and 1970s, her maternal grandparents had been denied the adoption of a young Black boy due to the fact that they were on government assistance. Lockington is the oldest of four siblings, one of whom as a biological child and the other two were also transracially adoptions.

Both of Lockington's parents are classical musicians.

In 2015, Lockington married her wife Vanessa. She is currently based in Lexington, Kentucky.

== Education ==
She learned the piano as a child, but picked flute as her instrument of choice. She went to Interlochen Arts Camp for the flute one summer, and for creative writing another. She participated in weekly slam poetry nights and memorized Naomi Long Madgettt's Her Story. Her parents came to Michigan for a national slam poetry competition, for which she had two main poems she considered. One was a "self-portrait" referring to her mother as a Venus flytrap and her father as a colonizer, and the one she chose, which was about her family's vegetarianism and veganism up until she was eight years old.

She also attended Interlochen Arts Academy in her senior year of high school.

Lockington graduated from the University of Michigan in 2007 with a dual BA in African-American Studies and Creative Writing and Literature. She has a Master of Education from Lesley University and an MFA in poetry from San Francisco State University, after which she briefly moved to New York City.

== Career ==
With knowledge of Spanish from a course at the University of Michigan, Lockington worked as a teaching fellow for Citizen Schools in Oakland, California. She also worked as a program coordinator and, later, director of education for 826 National and 826 NYC. In Lexington, Kentucky, she works with the Kentucky YMCA Youth Association.

Lockington is the founder of the womanist project Black Unicorn Book Club.

According to a spotlight by the University of Michigan,

"She has edited and contributed to many youth-centered book projects including: Be Honest and Other Advice from Students Across the Country (2011, The New Press), Growing Our Hearts and Brains: Poems on love, technology, and success (2014, 826NYC), Chicken Makes the Ice Cream Taste Better: Stories on Food and Community, (2015, 826NYC), and her co-authored lesson plan "The Science of Superpowers" is included in STEM to Story: Enthralling and Effective Lesson Plans for grades 5th-8th (2015, Jossey-Bass). She is a Bread Loaf Writers' Conference Alumni, Voices of Our Nation Arts Alumni, a Literary Death Match Champion, and she continues to teach writing all over the country."

In August 2016, her article "What A Black Woman Wishes her Adoptive White Parents Knew" was published and became trending on BuzzFeed News.

Her poetry chapbook The Lucky Daughter was published by Damaged Goods Press in 2017.

Her debut middle grade novel, For Black Girls Like Me (Makeda and the Georgia Belles was its rough title while being written), was published by Farrar, Straus and Giroux on July 30, 2019. It was Today Show's best kids book of 2019 and was given five starred reviews. It was recommended for the Charlotte Huck Award.

Her second middle-grade novel, In The Key of Us, was published by the same company on April 26, 2022. It became a Stonewall Honor honor book and was featured in The New York Times.

Her YA debut, Forever Is Now, was published on May 23, 2023. It stemmed from Lockington's own panic attacks and insomnia in the midst of the Covid-19 pandemic and following the death of Breonna Taylor. The novel won the Schneider Family Book Award.

"Every book I write starts with a playlist. The Forever is Now playlist is heavily influenced by some quintessential Bay Area artists, like Zion I, Too $short, and Goapele, but it's also a journey through moods— from sad, to angry, to joyful, and then to songs of resistance and love. I really enjoy thinking about the musical plot of a book, and even though I can't draft to music with lyrics, often between writing sessions, I play a song from the playlist to help me get ready for the next scene or even just to have a little dance break in my office. While I no longer practice my flute or the piano, I believe my poetry and storytelling are heavily influenced by my musical background. The full Forever Is Now playlist will be printed in the final book, so readers can engage with the songs as they like."

Lockington's second YA novel, I've Got My Love to Keep Me Warm , was released on October 14, 2025.

She has contributed to the anthologies This Is Our Rainbow: 16 Stories of Her, Him, Them, and Us (2021), When We Become Ours: A YA Adoptee Anothology (2023), and All The Love Under a Vast Sky 2025.

Her poems "cottonwood", "georgia in new mexico", "tumbleweed" and "DO YOU LOVE IT? I LOVE IT! I GOT IT AT ROSS!" were published in Prelude Magazine. "upon moving back to michigan i plant a garden & become re-acquainted with my sister" was published in Muzzle Magazine. "hummingbird music camp— summer, 1997" was published in Paper Darts Magazine. "night sweats" was published in Perigee— Apogee Journal. "mountains" was published in Bodega Magazine, Issue 49. "June 12, 2016" was published in Pulsamos: LGBTQ poets respond to the Pulse Night Club shooting, Glass Poetry Press. "dear sis" #bozalta4blacklives, was part of Issue 2, Bozalta Journal.

"kneel" was published in the Colorado Review, 2017. "prunus persica" was published by Locked Horn Press in Read America(s): An Anthology. "oakland, 2010" and "courses" were published in Washington Square, Issue 36. "Georgia Slave Code, 1848" and "the lucky daughter" were published in Uncommon Core: Contemperary Poems for Learning and Living.

As of 2023, she works at the UK College of Education's Office of Clinical Preparation and Partnerships as the research administrative coordinator.

== Sources ==
- "Confirmed Authors". Books By the Banks. Archived from the original on November 15, 2025.
- "Mariama J. Lockington". Penguin Random House. Archived from the original on January 7, 2026.
- "Mariama J. Lockington". TeachingBooks.
- Thomas, DeBraun (February 11, 2021). "Kentucky Women Writer's Radio Hour this Saturday Night at 8pm!". WUKY. Archived from the original on December 13, 2024.
- "Mariama J. Lockington". Vocabulary.com.
- "Interview (Part 1) With "For Black Girls Like Me" Author Mariama J. Lockington!". SO BOOKING COOL. July 27, 2019. Archived from the original on February 4, 2023.
