= Melissa (novel) =

2015 book by Alex Gino

- Author: Alex Gino
- Language: English
- Genre: LGBTQ, children's fiction, transgender
- Publisher: Scholastic Press
- Publication date: August 24, 2015 (as George) April 19, 2022 (as Melissa)
- Publication place: United States
- Pages: 224
- ISBN: 978-1338843415
- Followed by: Rick

Melissa, previously published as George, is a children's novel about a young transgender girl written by American author Alex Gino. The novel tells the story of Melissa, a fourth-grade student who is struggling to be herself in a world where others see her as George, a boy. Melissa uses the class play, Charlotte's Web, to show her mom that she is a girl by switching roles with her best friend, and playing the part of Charlotte. Scholastic first published the novel on August 25, 2015. Gino retitled the novel Melissa in 2021.

The novel has received positive feedback from sources such as The New York Times, National Public Radio, and Lambda Literary Review for its inclusion of transgender experiences. However, the book has remained controversial to some parents and teachers, leading it to be listed on the American Library Association's list of the 10 Most Challenged Books of 2016, 2017, 2018, 2019, and 2020 (topping the list in 2018, 2019, and 2020). Common reasons for challenging the book include its sexual references and conflict with "traditional family structure," with some saying schools and libraries should not "put books in a child's hand that require discussion." It ultimately became the fifth-most banned book between 2010 and 2020.

== Background ==
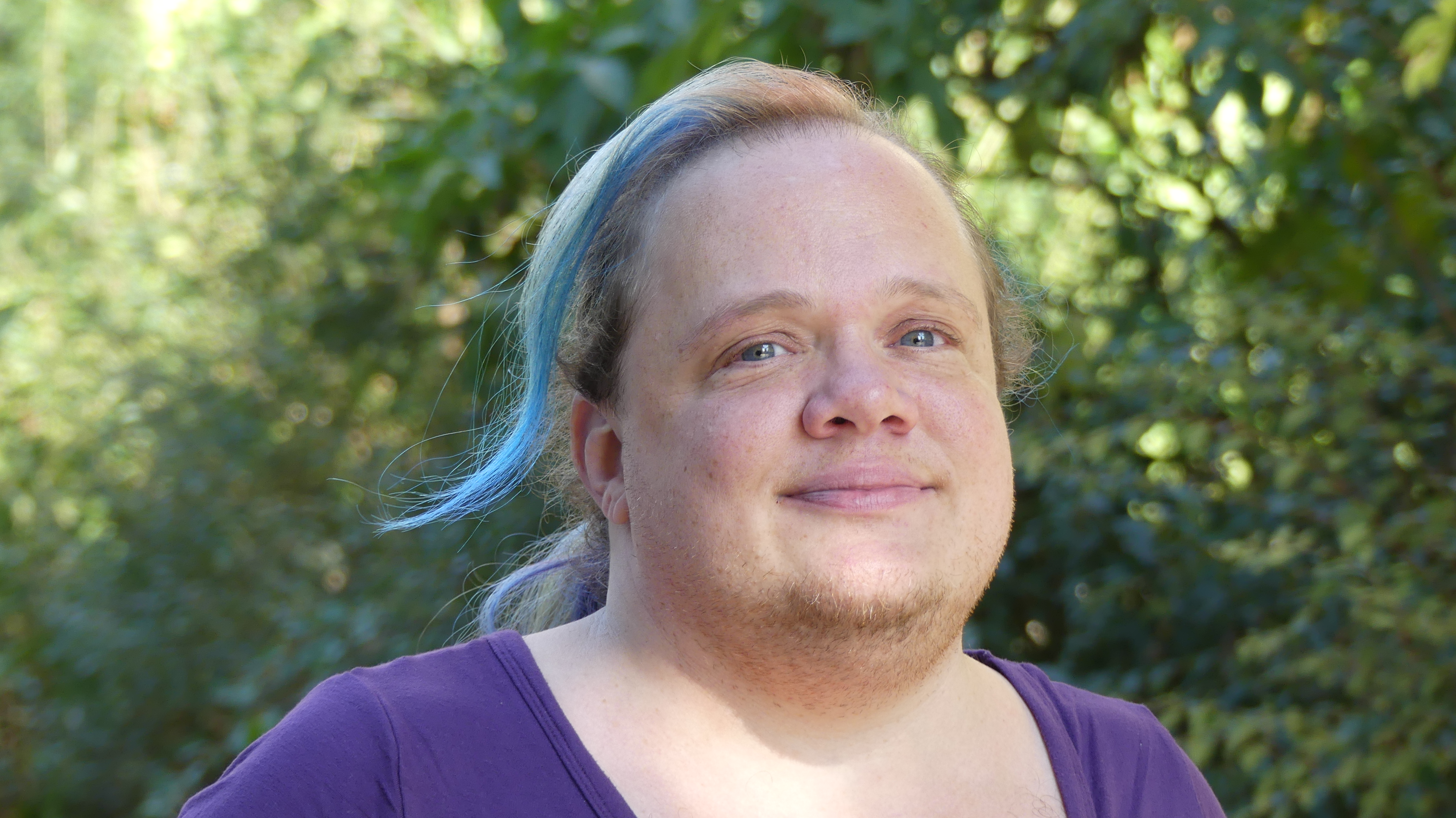
Alex Gino at the 16th International Literature Festival Berlin (2016)

Alex Gino wrote the novel "because it was the book [they] wanted to read" growing up. Gino also wanted to write it because they noticed a lack of transgender middle-grade literature aimed for 3rd grade to 7th grade, and they hoped the book would "help transgender children feel less alone." They wanted to fill this need and teach children about these issues. The novel simultaneously is meant to teach non-transgender children to be tolerant of trans people and show children who are trans that there are other people like them going through similar experiences.

Gino started their work on the book, then titled Girl George, in 2003 and made frequent draft revisions before publication to adjust to the changing social environment toward trans people. It had an initial press run in 2015 of 50,000 copies under Scholastic, and was sent out to over 10,000 teachers and children's librarians. In the future Gino wants Melissa to become "historical fiction."

== Plot ==
The novel follows Melissa, a transgender girl, whose family and the rest of the world sees as George, a boy. Melissa is in fourth grade, and her class is about to begin their production of Charlotte's Web. Auditions are fast approaching, and the class rules are that each girl will audition for the role of Charlotte and each boy will audition for the role of Wilbur, the pig. Melissa wants to audition for the role of Charlotte, and has the support and assistance of her best friend Kelly in doing so.

When Melissa gets called out into the hall and does her audition as Charlotte, her teacher, Ms. Udell, thinks Melissa is making a joke and tells Melissa that she cannot play the role of Charlotte, because she believes that Melissa is a boy. Since Melissa does not want to play a boy's role and Ms. Udell said that Charlotte was not an option, Melissa takes a role in the stage crew. Meanwhile, at home, Melissa's mom finds her secret collection of female magazines. Melissa's mother views her actions as childish and says that she does not want to see Melissa wearing "girl" clothing, shoes, or going in her room at all. Back at school, Melissa is still upset with Ms. Udell's reaction to her audition. In addition, she feels distant from her friend Kelly because Kelly got the role of Charlotte. However, as the classes' efforts to prepare for the upcoming production increased, Melissa finds a way to become the "Charlotte" of the stage crew by playing a supportive role for her friend. Inspired by Charlotte's courage, she gains the confidence to tell Kelly that she is a girl.

After processing this news, Kelly is supportive of her best friend Melissa, and her efforts to tell the world she is a girl. One afternoon, as the stage crew is working on the set, Jeff, the class bully, says that if he met a talking spider he would step on it. Melissa feels the instinct to protect Charlotte and paints "Some jerk" (in all caps) on a piece of paper and drops it on Jeff's back, painting the back of his sweatshirt with the words. After Jeff sees the damage, he punches Melissa to punish her for ruining his favorite sweatshirt, causing her to vomit on him. As a result of the fight, both Melissa and Jeff are in trouble with their teachers. However, in the process of getting punished, Melissa discovers that the principal is sympathetic to transgender people.

Later in the evening, when Melissa's mom questions her about the magazines, Melissa reveals to her mom that she is a girl. Her mom disregards her feelings, crushing Melissa in the process. On the other hand, when Melissa tells her brother Scott that she is a girl, he thinks her feelings match her behavior, and he offers his help and understanding to her. The night before the performance, Kelly and Melissa devise a plan for Melissa to be Charlotte in the play, which will help show everyone that she is a girl. Kelly will perform in the morning, and Melissa will perform at the evening show. Melissa does an excellent job performing as Charlotte and receives many compliments for her performance from classmates and the principal. Her mom is initially shocked at this performance but the performance later helps her become a more supportive and understanding mom to Melissa.

After the excitement of the performance, Melissa feels more comfortable with herself. When Kelly invites her to spend the day with her uncle at the zoo, Melissa takes this opportunity to show herself as she chooses because she will be surrounded by people who do not already know her as George. Dressed in Kelly's clothing, she and Kelly happily enjoy the day at the zoo.

== Genre ==
Melissa falls under several genres of literature. The intended reader is eight to twelve years old. It is a fictional novel that falls under the genres of children and LGBTQIAP+ literature. This novel contributes to the small but growing repertoire of middle-grade literature about gender and sexual identity.

== Publication ==
Gino started their work on the book in 2003, and the novel underwent several drafts before its August 2015 release. Gino worked closely with editors Jean Marie Stine and with David Levithan from Scholastic Corporation. One of the major edits to Gino's work was the title; the original title was Girl George (a reference to Boy George), but Scholastic changed it to George during the editing process. Before the commercial release, Scholastic sent over 10,000 copies to teachers in the United States which received mixed, but largely positive feedback. The teachers and librarians who opposed the novel argued that children are too young to be discussing these issues. However, the positive feedback convinced Scholastic to increase the first printing order from 35,000 to 50,000.

Scholastic Press and Scholastic UK prints copies in both hardcover and softcover. Translated copies can be found in English, Spanish, French, Catalan, Chinese Complex, Danish, Dutch, German, Italian, Japanese, Portuguese, Swedish and Vietnamese. Jamie Clayton, a transgender actress, narrated the audio book. Gino felt it was important to have "trans voices to telling trans stories" to make the story feel genuine.

In 2021, Gino and Scholastic changed the title of the novel from George to Melissa, saying they shouldn't have titled it with a name that "the main character does not like or want to use for herself". Gino initially suggested Melissa's Story as the new title of the novel, with Scholastic then choosing to shorten it to Melissa. They also suggest that readers "vandalize" their old copies of the book to accommodate the new title. Scholastic published an edition of the novel bearing the new title in April 2022 in the United States.

== Reception ==
While Melissa has been routinely challenged, it has also received various awards and praise for its content.

The School Library Journal, in a starred review, wrote that Melissa is "a required purchase" for readers interested in middle-grade literature. In The New York Times, children's author Tim Federle called Melissa a "timely, touching novel" with a unique protagonist. Mel Morrow said that Melissa was a "life-saving book" in a Lambda Literary review. In an NPR interview, transgender studies doctoral student J. Wallace Skelton praised the book's portrayal of bullying and its narrative "about a young person who is very much trying to become who they are," but criticized the book's original title of George, arguing that it does not support Melissa's true identity.

=== Censorship in the United States ===
Melissa appeared on the American Library Association's Top Ten Most Challenged Book list every year between 2016 and 2020. It was the fifth-most banned book between 2010 and 2020. The book has been challenged for various reasons, including its portrayal of a transgender child; sexual themes that were claimed to be "not appropriate at elementary levels," such as mentions of "dirty magazines" and pornography and descriptions of physical anatomy; conflicts with religious viewpoints and "traditional family structure"; and supposedly encouraging children to "clear browser history and change their bodies using hormones".

In 2017, a library supervisor for the Wichita, Kansas public school system decided not to automatically include Melissa on a list of books sent to district libraries, citing its sexual references and allegedly age-inappropriate language. Wichita school libraries could not use system funds to purchase the novel, but would instead need to rely on building funds or interlibrary loans to provide access. In response, Gino organized a Twitter fundraising campaign to buy enough copies of Melissa for each of the district's 57 elementary and K-8 school libraries.

In April 2018, the Tigard-Tualatin School District in King City, Oregon considered requiring parents to sign a permission slip before letting elementary students check out Melissa. Some parents protested the idea as censorship, while others praised it for keeping parents informed.

Melissa was selected as a text for students in grades 3–5 in the 2018 Oregon Battle of the Books reading competition. Officials from two Oregon school districts withdrew their students from the competition as a result, claiming a belief that the book was "developmentally inappropriate" due to references to pornography and other content. Gino stated that these objections were "a decoy" for disapproval of the book's transgender themes.

== Analysis ==
Allyship is a major theme in Melissa. Gino said in an interview at an Ann Arbor bookstore that they wrote Melissa to guide family, friends, teachers and students alike in better sympathizing with the experiences of transgender children. In their 2019 article in the Journal of Children's Literature, Jill M. Hermann-Wilmarth and Caitlin L. Ryan contended that the novel instructs readers on how to be better allies for their transgender friends and peers through its focus on Melissa's interactions with other characters and the impact they have on her. How Melissa is either hurt or helped by these interactions in her coming-out process can help readers create safe spaces for transgender people to express their identities in real life. A book on the inclusion of queer adolescent literature in English Language Arts (ELA) classes suggests the use of Melissa in middle-level ELA classrooms as a means of promoting both allyship and critical discussion about how to remedy difference among their students.

Gender roles and how they define human interaction are also main themes in Melissa. Hermann-Wilmarth and Ryan wrote that many of Melissa's interactions with both her peers and superiors exemplify the struggle of transgender children to challenge the gender binary. When Melissa tells Ms. Udell, for example, that she wants to play Charlotte in the school play, Ms. Udell does not take her seriously and even "scowls" at the idea, a response that demonstrates her strong discomfort with such a forward challenge of gender roles. Kelly and Scott, Melissa's best friend and brother, respectively, also have difficulty coming to terms with Melissa's identity as a girl, while other kids at school bully her for her girlishness. She challenges the cisnormative expectations of these characters, resulting in either pain and violence, as in the case of her bullies, or eventual acceptance and growth in the case of her family members and close friends. By providing these various examples of how gender expectations govern different interactions and relationships between characters, Melissa pushes its cisgender readers to consider what it means to be excluded from binary gender roles and how to rid themselves of strict gender expectations.

In a 2015 article in The Conversation, PhD candidate in Children's Literature Rebecca Cierazek discussed how Melissa provides transgender children with a relatable narrative. The dichotomy between who Melissa believes herself to be and who others take her as is representative of the identity struggle many transgender kids face that often goes unrecognized in children's literature. Cierazek suggested that by informing parents and kids about what it means to be transgender, Melissa can help eliminate discrimination of 2SLGBTQIA children that often stems from fear and ignorance.

Mel Morrow in the Lambda Literary Review writes about Alex Gino's Melissa. Morrow writes that the problems that transgender children face both privately and publicly are addressed head-on by Alex Gino in George. During Melissa's transition period, Gino demonstrates these difficulties through Melissa's interaction with various characters. Through these interactions, Gino demonstrates diverse responses to Melissa's transition while gradually leading the characters to accept Melissa's transition.

Morrow believes that the intended reader for Melissa is eight to twelve years old. This age range intelligently removes "sexuality from the identity-formation equation." Melissa breaks the stigma that her family and readers may hold that gender expression is correlated with sexuality.

== Accolades ==
=== Awards ===
- 2016 Stonewall Book Award: Mike Morgan and Larry Romans Children's Literature Award
- 2016 California Book Awards: Juvenile (Gold)
- 2016 Lambda Literary Award: LGBT Children's/Young Adult

=== Nominations ===
- 2016–2017 Dorothy Canfield Fisher Children's Book Award
- 2016 E. B. White Read Aloud Award: Middle Reader
- 2016–2017 Georgia Children's Book (Gr. 4–8) Awards: Other Worthwhile Books for Grades 4–8
- 2015 Goodreads Choice Award: Best Middle Grade & Children's

== See also ==
- 2015 in literature
