= Alma and How She Got Her Name =

2018 picture book

- Cover of the book in Spanish
- Author: Juana Martinez-Neal
- Publisher: Candlewick Press
- Publication date: April 10, 2018
- Publication place: United States
- Pages: 32
- Awards: Caldecott Honor; Ezra Jack Keats Book Award
- ISBN: 978-0-7636-9355-8

Alma and How She Got Her Name is a 2018 children's picture book by Juana Martinez-Neal. Alma, whose full name is Alma Sofia Esperanza José Pura Candela, thinks she has too many names and so she asks her dad about them. He explains the various people she was named to honor. The book was spurred by Martinez-Neal's Peruvian immigrant experience and the birth of her children. The book was well reviewed and received a 2019 Caldecott Honor for its illustrations. The graphite and colored pencil illustrations feature only a few colors, including blue and pink. Martinez-Neal hoped to evoke the feel of a photo album, in keeping with the book's theme of family.

== Background and publication ==
Juana Martinez-Neal moved to the United States in her 20s. As an immigrant, she grappled with her identity, before deciding that "my culture was part of my whole personal identity, and I wanted to pass my culture on to my children." As part of this desire, it was around this time that she began to author and illustrate children's books. She based Alma on her own experiences growing up and hearing the stories of her relatives. Her agent, Stefanie Von Borstel, pitched the book, with sample illustrations, to a variety of publishers, with seven being selected for an auction. Candlewick Press was eventually selected as the publisher.

The book was published in English and Spanish on April 10, 2018. This simultaneous publication was important to Martinez-Neal, and was part of the book's auction process.

== Plot ==
When the book opens Alma Sofia Esperanza José Pura Candela feels that her name is too long. Her father, upon hearing Alma's complaint, offers to tell her the story of her name. For each name her father tells her about the relative she was named for and Alma is able to make a connection between herself and the relative. After hearing about her five other names Alma asks about her first name. Her father explains that there is no other Alma, just her. At the end of the book Alma feels her name fits and that she has "a story to tell."

== Writing and illustrations ==
The book was illustrated using graphite and colored pencils. They created, in the words of The Horn Book Magazine reviewer Megan Dowd Lambert, "a soft texture". It was Martinez-Neal's hope to create "the feel of an old family photo album." It also, in the words of Horn Book's Emily Prabhaker, "underscores Alma’s agency throughout the book. We see her as a writer through her own handwriting and as an artist in the depictions of her own graphite drawings." Through her use of blues and pinks she hoped to help differentiate what was happening the present from the past. Alma herself is illustrated as the same cream color as the background.

Family plays an important role in the story. Each family member's name was signed uniquely, reflecting Martinez-Neal's interest in typography and her hope that this signature would help to express the family member's personality. She also embedded references to Alma's Peruvian lineage through the illustrations. Through her father's stories Alma connects who she is to her namesake family members. This includes Alma making eye contact with her ancestors as she imagines the stories her father is telling her. However, the closing line also suggests the way that Alma's story will be unique as her father advises her, "You will make your own story", a question Martinez-Neal echoes in the author's note.

== Reception and awards ==
The book was generally well reviewed. It received starred reviews from Publishers Weekly, which called the book "a winner" and School Library Journal, where reviewer Daryl Grabarek summarized the book as, "a beautifully illustrated, tender story to be shared with all children." In a positive review, Julia Smith writing in Booklist praised the illustrations, "Martinez-Neal brings her gentle story to life through beautiful graphite- and colored-pencil artwork set against cream-colored backgrounds."

The book received a Caldecott Honor in 2019 for its illustrations, with the committee writing how "Martinez-Neal uses smudgy graphite and colored pencil to convey a soft palette that gently transports readers into Alma’s rich ancestral past." Martinez-Neal expressed her pride as a Peruvian in winning the award and that the achievement of winning the Caldecott was a "recognition for all the years it took to get here, to develop the work, to find my voice ... including those years when I felt I didn’t know what I was doing."
