= Murder of Nia Wilson =

2018 murder and assaults in Oakland, California

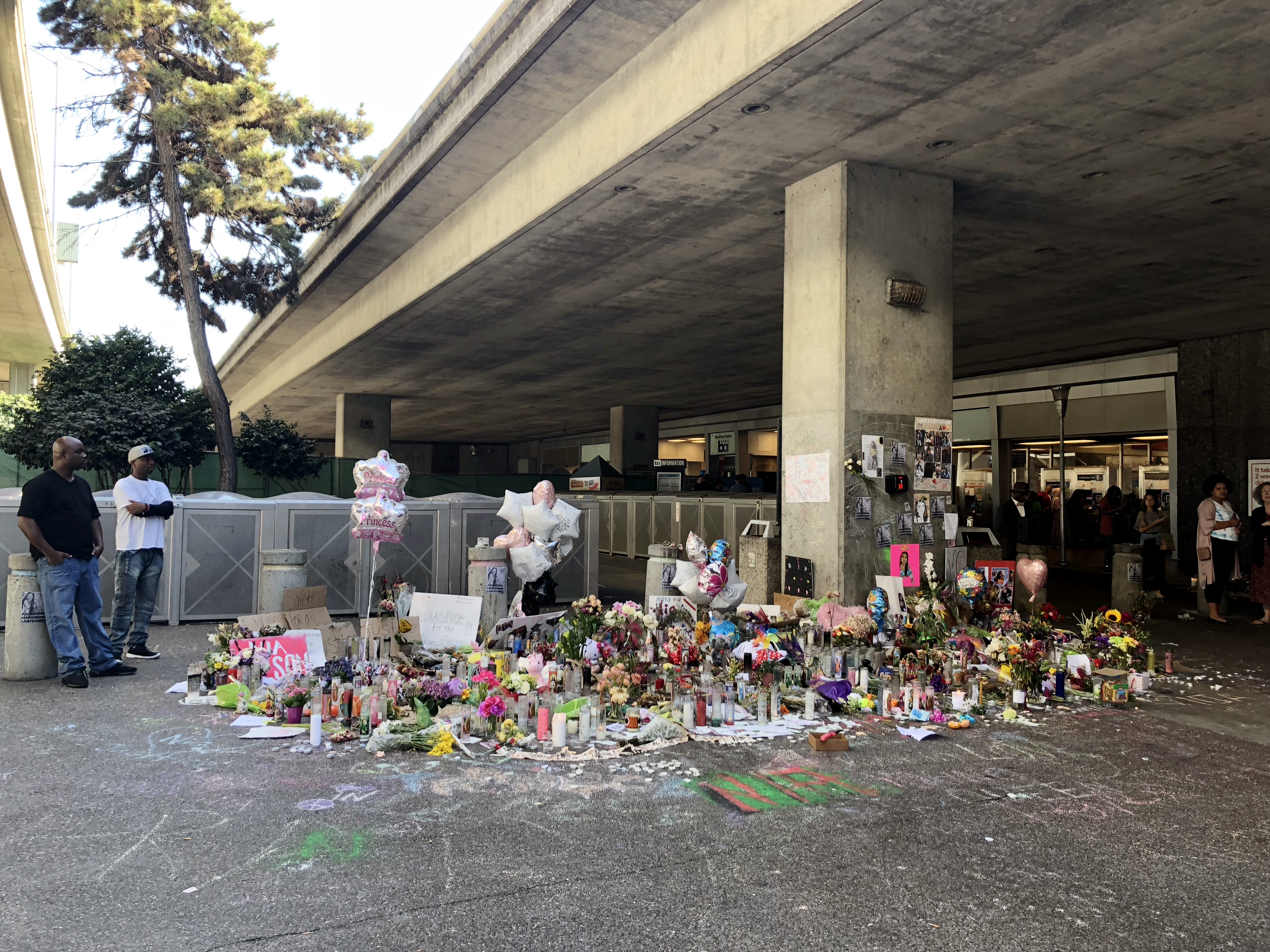
- A temporary memorial and vigil held in tribute to Nia Wilson at MacArthur station in Oakland, California on August 3, 2018

- Murder of Nia Wilson (Oakland, California) Location of MacArthur station in Oakland, California
- Date: July 22, 2018
- Location: MacArthur station (BART) in Oakland, California, U.S.; 37.828260°N 122.267275°W
- Deaths: Nia Wilson
- Accused: John Cowell
- Charges: First-degree murder, assault with a deadly weapon, parole violation

On July 22, 2018, three sisters, Nia, Letifah and Tashiya Wilson, were attacked by a man wielding a knife, later identified as John Cowell, after exiting a Bay Area Rapid Transit (BART) train at MacArthur station in Oakland, California. 18-year-old Nia Wilson died after her throat was slashed. Her older sister, Letifah, was stabbed in the neck but survived. Tashiya was not physically harmed.

Cowell, aged 27, was identified as the suspect immediately following the attack, and he was caught the following day. Cowell had been paroled in May 2018 after serving time for second degree robbery, and had previous charges for assault and possession of methamphetamine.

Initial perception of the attack as apparently racially motivated spurred protests at MacArthur BART station and online. Cowell's parents stated their belief that the attack was possibly motivated by Cowell's mental illness. Authorities have yet to establish a motive for the attack and have also stated that there is no evidence that the attack was racially motivated. On July 17, 2020, Cowell was sentenced to life in prison without the possibility of parole.

== Background ==
=== Victims ===
Nia Wilson (November 10, 1999 – July 22, 2018) was a cheerleader and a rapper. She dreamed of having a dance studio. She and her cousins were in a music group called Girlz N The Hood. Their album Fake Shit was released post-Wilson's death; the group planned to reshoot the video but they did not release it until after she passed. Wilson was known as being talented with makeup, and was known by the nickname PG, short for pretty girl.

Nia was the daughter of Ansar El Muhammad and Alicia Grayson. She is the youngest of six sisters (including Malika Harris, Letifah Wilson, Nishiya Wilson and Tashiya Wilson) and two brothers. Her cousin, Tijanae Lafleur, 19, has also spoken about Wilson's character and stated they had previously had a conversation on what he should do in the event that someone ever hurt her. Lafleur told reporters that Wilson told him to not let anyone who hurt her get away with it. Wilson's other cousin, Byron Brown, stated Wilson would have wanted more than one protest. He remembers her stating, “justice is never served when black people were killed."

At a 2016 vigil for her boyfriend and his best friend, who had drowned in a reservoir, a shot was fired into the crowd of 3000 hitting 16 year old Reggin'a Jefferies in the neck. Jefferies was standing right next to Wilson. Wilson stayed with Jefferies until medical help arrived. According to her father, she was set to graduate with honors from an Oakland continuation school, Dewey Academy.

At the time of the attack Letifah Wilson was aged 26.

=== Suspect ===
Twenty-seven year-old John Cowell has been described as a 5 feet, 8 inch tall white man. Cowell was raised in Concord, California where he lived on and off for years. Cowell's earliest brush with the law came at age 18 when he was arrested for allegedly beating up a man and the man's daughter.

Four days before the stabbing, Cowell was confronted for not paying his BART fare. In 2016, Cowell had been found guilty of second degree robbery after he brandished a knife and a fake gun in a Lucky store at El Cerrito Plaza after a security guard confronted him over stealing. He was arrested at El Cerrito BART Station and was sentenced to two years in federal prison. Cowell had been released on parole in May 2018.

Also in 2016, Cowell was arrested for petty theft, illegal possession of tear gas, possession of an illegal smoking device and drug possession, but these charges were dismissed due to the robbery conviction. In 2016, Kaiser Richmond Medical Center filed a restraining order against Cowell for threatening to kill one of their employees. In 2015, Cowell's family filed a restraining order against him after he allegedly tried to enter their home while under the influence of drugs. Later that same year, Cowell was arrested for possession of a controlled substance after he was found high on methamphetamine and was sentenced to 90 days in jail.

In 2013, Cowell was convicted of battery in Walnut Creek. In 2009, Cowell was arrested and charged with felony assault, for beating 51-year-old Shane Glick, and punching Glick's daughter after they confronted him about a recent burglary. Also, in both Alameda and Contra Costa counties, Cowell's arrest record lists charges of assault with a deadly weapon, possession of a controlled substance, vandalism and petty theft.

He was arrested on July 23, 2018. Cowell was homeless before the attack.

=== Bay Area Rapid Transit ===
In five days, three unrelated homicides, including Wilson's murder, occurred at Bay Area Rapid Transit (BART) stations. Hours after Wilson's funeral, another two people were stabbed at MacArthur BART station, causing the station to again be shut down. BART has stated they had been planning to make security improvements well before Nia Wilson's death. The plan involves massive security camera improvements. BART would need $15 million over four years to upgrade the current system to digital, $1.3 million per year to monitor the technology, and $4.9 million to install a Physical Security Information System (PSIM). The plan would cost $28 million total to implement.

== Murder ==
=== Event ===
On the night of July 22, 2018, Nia Wilson and two of her sisters (Letifah and Tashiya), were returning from a party at their aunt's in Concord, California. They had gotten on the train at Concord station and were transferring trains at MacArthur station, in order to go home. According to a BART spokesperson, the perpetrator also rode from Concord station.

At approximately 9:30 pm at MacArthur station, the perpetrator slashed Nia's carotid artery and her jugular vein and stabbed her older sister Letifah in the neck. The attacker was silent and stood back watching as Nia died, while Letifah, who survived with a serious neck wound, held her. Tashiya was uninjured. Nia died two minutes after being stabbed because of blood loss. The perpetrator then fled through the emergency door and into a parking lot, where he changed into different clothes as seen on surveillance video

Police identified John Cowell based on security cameras at the scene, a backpack with Cowell's identification inside, and witness statements of him wiping the knife clean and fleeing after the attack.

=== Motive ===
The motive for the attack has not yet been identified. The Wilson sisters told reporters they had never seen Cowell before the stabbing. Activists and news outlets speculated the attack could have been racially motivated. Mayor Libby Schaaf released the statement: “The fact that his victims were both young African-American women stirs deep pain and palpable fear in all of us who acknowledge the reality that our country still suffers from a tragic and deeply racist history,” while still confirming the city "has no room for hate and the city stands against racial hatred and white supremacy," but reinforced that officials have no evidence that the killing of Wilson was racially motivated. Bart Police Chief Rojas stated this was the "most vicious attack he had ever seen" during his 30-year police career.

Cowell's parents released a public statement where they claimed the attack was possibly motivated by Cowell's mental illness. Cowell had been diagnosed with bipolar disorder and schizophrenia. Wilson's family, and activists maintain the attack was targeted and racially motivated. The San Francisco Chronicle reported that Cowell and a black friend have matching tattoos. The New Yorker has stated that the tattoo is not an indicator of whether or not the murder was a hate crime.

=== Arrest and trial ===
John Cowell was arrested on July 23, 2018, at Pleasant Hill BART Station at 6:27 p.m. A witness is reportedly responsible for his apprehension; the witness saw Cowell at the station and called the police. Cowell was then booked on charges of first-degree murder, assault with a deadly weapon and violation of parole. His arraignment was scheduled for July 26, 2018, but was postponed until August 22. Cowell was held at Santa Rita Jail in Dublin without bail.

On August 22, 2018, Alameda County prosecutors added a charge of lying in wait. The added charge meant if convicted, he would face life without parole or even the possibility of the death penalty. Cowell's lawyers requested more time to review the evidence, and the plea entry date was postponed until September 14, 2018.

On September 14, 2018, attorneys further delayed entering a plea. The plea entry was delayed until the date of October 26, 2018. Specifically the defense was waiting for the prosecution to release the video of the fatal stabbing in order to inform their plea.

On October 11, 2019, Judge Kevin Murphy agreed to seal a future motion to dismiss the case submitted by Cowell's public defender, and the motion was to be argued in open court proceedings on November 22, 2019. Cowell was also expected to enter a plea on November 22, 2019. The court found Cowell competent to stand trial in July 2019 after three court-appointed doctors evaluated him. One of the evaluations found Cowell incompetent, one found him competent, and the third evaluation's author could not come to a conclusion.

On July 17, 2020, Cowell was sentenced to life in prison without the possibility of parole.

On January 5, 2023, Cowell's appeal of his life sentence was rejected by a unanimous decision by a 3-judge panel of the First Appellate District of California.

=== Media coverage and public outcry ===
==== Celebrity input ====
The hashtag #NiaWilson, #SayHerName, and #JusticeForNiaWilson went viral on Twitter July 23, 2018, sparking commentary from Anne Hathaway, Rose McGowan, Tracee Ellis Ross, Bruno Mars, Viola Davis, Common, Janelle Monáe, and Jada Pinkett Smith. Singer Kehlani called the attacker a “white supremacist.”

Basketball player Stephen Curry helped to raise over $21,000 during a game for young Bay Area athletes at the Kezar Pavilion in San Francisco, California which he streamed on his Facebook page.

==== Media critiques ====
Activists have widely critiqued the coverage of the murder from Fox affiliate KTVU after the station released a photo of Wilson holding a cell phone case that appeared to be a gun rather than the many other available photos of the teen. The photo sharing was condemned and critiqued by The National Association of Black Journalists, the Bay Area Black Journalists Association and the Robert C. Maynard Institute for Journalism Education. KTVU's anchor, Frank Somerville, later issued an apology for the image.

The San Francisco Chronicle was criticized for titling an article about the murder “BART Killing: Divergent Paths Met Tragically on Oakland Platform.” Critics said there was a difference between the way black victims are portrayed in the media and wrote that this title minimized Wilson's status as a victim.

A report by Media Matters critiqued various cable news networks for underreporting the event, oftentimes failing to even mention Wilson's name.

==== National public protests and vigils ====
On July 23, 2018, over 1000 protestors attended a vigil for Nia Wilson and marched through the streets surrounding MacArthur BART station carrying signs with Nia Wilson's name and chanting, "No Justice, No Peace."

On August 2, a group of young activists gathered at Frank Ogawa Plaza for an event called “Youth Speak, Adults Listen,” where they discussed feeling unsafe in public and how Nia Wilson's death exemplifies this fear. Wilson's murder has sparked international conversations on racial violence.

At the McArthur BART Station, there are two large publicly created monuments to Wilson, including large displays of flowers, balloons, candles, and public performances.

On August 3, activist bike rider Najari Smith, cofounder of Rich City Rides, attached speakers and a microphone to his bike and dedicated a ride to Wilson. There were approximately 30 people on the group bicycle ride dedicated to Wilson.

== Civil suit ==
The family of Wilson sued BART for failing to protect Nia and her sister. Specifically because transit officers had caught Cowell skipping fares a few days before the attack, and because of his previous arrest at a BART station, Wilson's family stated that Cowell should not have been allowed back at the stations. The Arns Law Firm prepared the suit, claiming Cowell's violence was foreseeable and preventable. The claim also contended that two weeks before Cowell attacked the Wilson sisters, he threatened to attack two other BART passengers but BART employees were not available to take a report. The family sought financial compensation for Nia Wilson's death, Letifah Wilson's injuries and the family's emotional distress in addition to improved safety measures in order to prevent further attacks from taking place.

== Memorial ==
Wilson's memorial was held on August 3, 2018, at 11 a.m. at the Acts Full Gospel Church in East Oakland. Her funeral was live-streamed. 18 doves were released at the service, one to represent each year of Wilson's life. Her casket was brought to her resting place in a horse-drawn carriage. A letter from California Congresswoman Maxine Waters was read aloud at the memorial. Oakland Congresswoman Barbara Lee also spoke at the service.

== See also ==
- Killing of Iryna Zarutska
