= Juana Martinez-Neal =

Peruvian American children's book author and illustrator

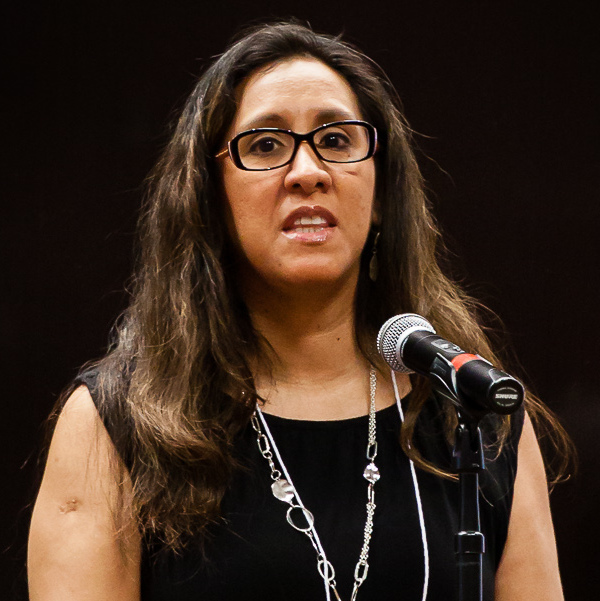
- Juana Martinez-Neal in 2016
- Born: Lima, Peru
- Occupations: Children's author, illustrator
- Relatives: Victor Martínez Gómez (father), Victor Martinez Malaga (grandfather)
- Writing career
- Genre: Children's fantasy
- Website: juanamartinezneal.com

Juana Martinez-Neal is a Peruvian American children's book author and illustrator. Her debut book as an author and illustrator, Alma and How She Got Her Name, was well reviewed and won a 2019 Caldecott Honor.

== Biography ==
Juana Martinez-Neal grew up in Lima, Peru. Growing up she hoped to be a painter, like her father and grandfather, as the profession of illustrator was not common in Peru. She moved to the United States in her mid-20s. After having children of her own she decided to become an author and illustrator of children's books. She now lives in Connecticut, with her husband and three children.

== Bibliography ==
As Writer and Illustrator

- Alma and How She Got Her Name, Candlewick Press, 2018 ISBN 978-0-7636-9355-8
- Alma y cómo obtuvo su nombre, Candlewick Press, 2018 ISBN 978-0-7636-9358-9
- Zonia's Rainforest, Candlewick Press, 2021 ISBN 978-1-5362-0845-0
- La selva de Zonia, Candlewick Press, 2021 ISBN 978-1-5362-1336-2

As Illustrator

- La Madre Goose, written by Susan Middleton Elya, Putnam, 2016 ISBN 978-0-399-25157-3
- La Princesa and the Pea, written by Susan Middleton Elya, Putnam, 2017 ISBN 978-0-399-25156-6
- Babymoon, written by Hayley Barrett, Candlewick Press, 2019 ISBN 978-0-763-68852-3
- Fry Bread, written by Kevin Noble Maillard, Roaring Brook Press, 2019 ISBN 978-1-626-72746-5
- Swashby and the Sea, written by Beth Ferry, Houghton Mifflin Harcourt, 2020 ISBN 978-0-544-70737-5
- Tomatoes for Neela, written by Padma Lakshmi, Viking Children's Books, 2021 ISBN 978-0-593-20270-8
- A Perfect Fit, written by Mara Rockliff, Houghton Mifflin Harcourt, 2022 ISBN 978-0-358-12543-3
- I Don't Care, written by Julie Fogliano, illustrated by Molly Idle and Juana Martinez-Neal, Neal Porter Books-Holiday House, 2022 (Forthcoming) ISBN 978-0-8234-4345-1

== Awards and honors ==
- 2018 Pura Belpré Illustrator Winner – La Princesa and the Pea
- 2019 Caldecott Honor – Alma and How She Got Her Name
- 2019 Ezra Jack Keats Award Writer Honor – Alma and How She Got Her Name”
- 2020 Sibert Medal – Fry Bread: A Native American Family Story
- 2026 Sibert Medal - Alberto Salas Plays Paka Paka con la Papa
