= Hena Khan =

Pakistani-American children's book author

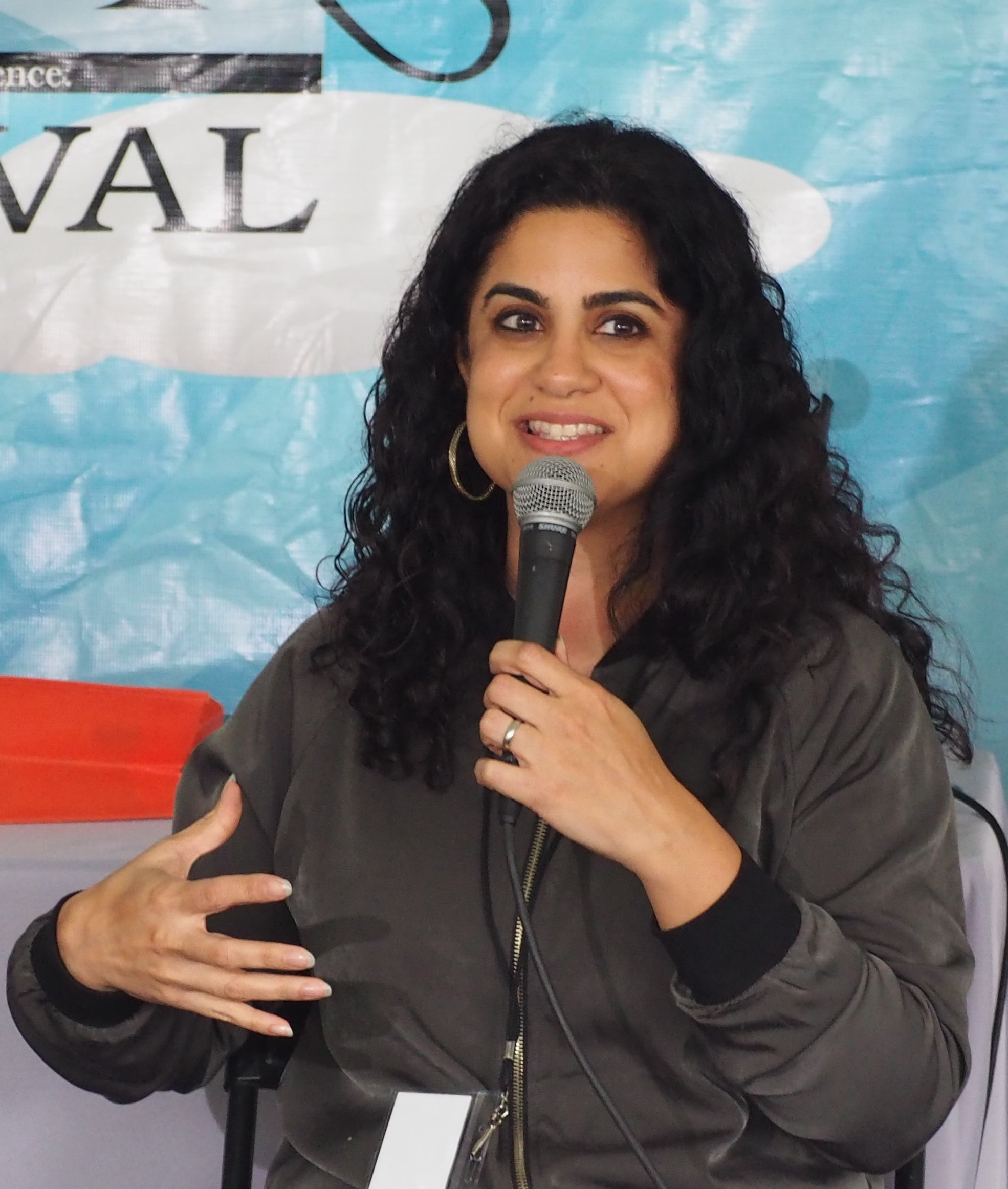
- Born: United States of America
- Education: George Washington University; MA in International Affairs
- Occupations: Novelist, picture book writer
- Children: 2
- Writing career
- Language: English
- Years active: 2008–present
- Genres: picture books, middle grade fiction
- Notable works: Amina's Voice, Amina's Song
- Notable awards: 2022 Asian/Pacific American Award for Children's Literature
- Website: henakhan.com//

Hena Khan (born 1973 or 1974) is an American author of children's books. Khan is best known for her middle-grade novel Amina's Voice and its follow-up novel, Amina's Song, which won the Asian/Pacific American Award for Children's Literature in 2022. Amina's Voice was the first book published under Simon & Schuster's Salaam Reads imprint in 2017. Khan has authored or co-authored more than twenty picture and middle-grade books.

== Early life and education ==
Khan grew up near Rockville, Maryland, as the second of four children born to Pakistani immigrants. Growing up, she enjoyed checking out books from the library.

Khan earned an MA in international affairs from George Washington University.

== Career ==
Prior to becoming an author, Khan worked with non-profit health and research organizations as a writer and editor.

She has mentioned Beverly Cleary as a writing hero, particularly her Ramona series, and has also cited Louisa May Alcott's Little Women as inspiration for her novel More to the Story.

Khan was approached by Houghton Mifflin Harcourt to co-author a Curious George book, titled It's Ramadan, Curious George.

== Personal life ==
Khan lives with her family in Rockville, Maryland, and has two sons. She is Muslim.

== Works ==
=== Novels ===
- Amina's Voice (Salaam Reads, 2017)
- Power Forward (Salaam Reads, 2018)
- On Point (Salaam Reads, 2018)
- Bounce Back (Salaam Reads, 2018)
- More to the Story (Salaam Reads, 2020)
- Amina's Song (Salaam Reads, 2021)
- The Unicorn Rescue Society: The Secret of the Himalayas, co-authored with Adam Gidwitz, illustrated by Hatem Aly (Penguin Random House, 2021)
- Zara’s Rules for Record-Breaking Fun (Salaam Reads, 2022)
- Super You! Power of Flight: A Pick-Your-Path Adventure, co-authored with Andrea Menotti, illustrated by Yancey Labat (Penguin Random House, 2022)
- Zara’s Rules for Finding Hidden Treasure (Salaam Reads, 2022)
- Super You! Power of Invisibility: A Pick-Your-Path Adventure, co-authored with Andrea Menotti, illustrated by Yancey Labat (Penguin Random House, 2023)
- Zara’s Rules for Living Your Best Life (Salaam Reads, 2023)

=== Picture books ===
- Night of the Moon, illustrated by Julie Paschkis (Chronicle Books, 2008)
- Golden Domes and Silver Lanterns: A Muslim Book of Colors, illustrated by Mehrdokht Amini (Chronicle Books, 2012)
- It's Ramadan, Curious George, co-authored with H. A. Rey (Clarion Books, 2016)
- Crescent Moons and Pointed Minarets: A Muslim Book of Shapes, illustrated by Mehrdokht Amini (Chronicle Books, 2018)
- Under My Hijab, illustrated by Aaliya Jaleel (Lee & Low Books, 2019)
- Like the Moon Loves the Sky, illustrated by Saffa Khan (Chronicle Books, 2020)
- One Sun and Countless Stars: A Muslim Book of Numbers, illustrated by Mehrdokht Amini (Chronicle Books, 2022)
- Zain’s Super Friday, illustrated by Nez Riaz (Lee & Low Books, 2023)

== Awards ==
- 2022 Asian/Pacific American Award for Children's Literature for Amina's Song
