= Alex Gino =

American children's book writer (born 1977)

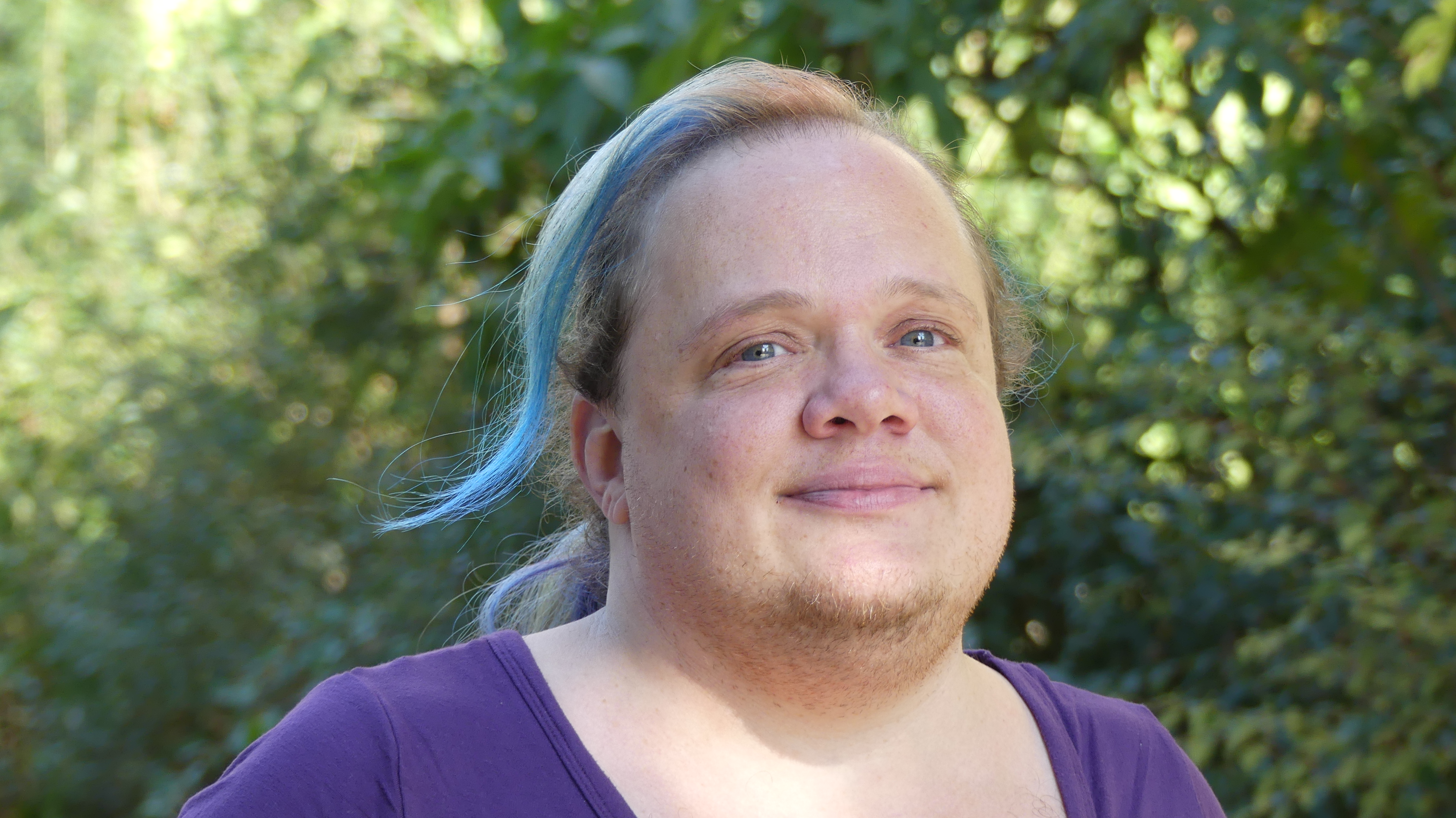
- Gino at the 2016 Berlin International Literature Festival
- Born: October 1, 1977 (age 49); Staten Island, New York, U.S.
- Occupation: Author
- Notable work: Melissa
- Awards: Lambda Literary Award for Children's and Young Adult Literature (2016); Stonewall Book Award for Children & Young Adults (2016)
- Website: alexgino.com

Alex Gino (born October 1, 1977) is a genderqueer American children's book writer. Gino's debut book, Melissa, was the winner of the 2016 Stonewall Book Award and the 2016 Lambda Literary Award in the category of LGBT Children's/Young Adult.

== Works ==
=== Melissa (2015) ===
Gino is best known for their 2015 debut novel Melissa, a middle grade novel featuring a young transgender girl, which they first began work on in 2003. The working title of the novel was Girl George (a reference to Boy George), but Scholastic changed it to George during the editing process. Gino expressed some regrets about deadnaming their character with this title, and in 2021 announced that they were renaming the novel Melissa's Story. With regards to requests for a sequel to Melissa, Gino stated in 2016 that "they will NOT be writing a transition story for a largely cis audience more interested in trans bodies than trans people."

The novel received starred reviews from Booklist, Kirkus Reviews, Publishers Weekly, and Shelf Awareness.

However, it has remained controversial to some parents and teachers, leading it to be listed on the American Library Association's list of the 10 Most Challenged Books of 2016, 2017, 2018, 2019, and 2020 (topping the list in 2018, 2019, and 2020). It ultimately became the fifth-most banned book between 2010 and 2020. Common reasons for challenging the book include its sexual references and conflict with "traditional family structure," with some saying schools and libraries should not "put books in a child's hand that require discussion."

=== You Don't Know Everything, Jilly P! (2018) ===
In 2018, Gino released another middle grade novel, You Don't Know Everything, Jilly P! It focuses upon Deaf culture and the Black Lives Matter movement, and it received starred reviews from Kirkus Reviews, Publishers Weekly, and the School Library Journal.

=== Rick (2020) ===
Their 2020 novel, Rick, is a standalone follow-up to Melissa and is about a student coming to terms with his asexuality. The book received starred reviews from Kirkus Reviews, Booklist, and School Library Journal.

=== Alice Austen Lived Here (2022) ===
In 2022, Gino published the young adult novel, Alice Austen Lived Here about Sam and TJ, two nonbinary seventh graders in Staten Island conducting research on Alice Austen, a nearly forgotten 19th-century lesbian photographer. The book included themes on queer history and the fat liberation movement.

=== Green (2023) ===
In 2023, Gino published another stand-alone sequel to Melissa, Green, which follows a non-binary student at Melissa's school.

== Awards and honors ==
In 2015, Publishers Weekly named Gino a "Flying Start" author. That year, Kirkus Reviews included Melissa on their list of the year's best children's books. Booklist included it on their "Top 10 First Novels for Youth" list.

Awards for Gino's writing
Year	Title	Award	Result	Ref.
2015	Melissa	Goodreads Choice Award for Best Middle Grade & Children's	Nominee	
2016	Melissa	ALSC Notable Children's Books	Selection	
2016	Melissa	California Book Award for Juvenile	Winner	
2016	Melissa	Children's Choice Book Award for Debut Author	Winner	
2016	Melissa	The E.B. White Read Aloud Award for Middle Reader	Honor	
2016	Melissa	Lambda Literary Award for Children's and Young Adult Literature	Winner	
2016	Melissa	Stonewall Book Award for Children & Young Adults	Winner	
2016–17	Melissa	Dorothy Canfield Fisher Children's Book Award	Nominee	
2016–17	Melissa	Georgia Children's Book (Gr. 4–8) Awards: Other Worthwhile Books for Grades 4–8	Finalist	

== Publications ==
=== Anthology contributions ===
- "Essay" in How I Resist: Activism and Hope for a New Generation, edited by Maureen Johnson (2018)
- "Body Sovereignty: This Fat Trans Flesh Is Mine" in The (Other) F Word: A Celebration of the Fat and Fierce, edited by Angie Manfredi (2019)
- "The Purr-cle of Life" in This Is Our Rainbow: 16 Stories of Her, Him, Them, and Us, edited by Katherine Locke and Nicole Melleby (2021)
- "Fat Out Loud" in Body Talk: 37 Voices Explore Our Radical Anatomy, edited by Kelly Jensen (2020)

=== Novels ===
- Melissa, originally published as George (2015)
- You Don't Know Everything, Jilly P! (2018)
- Rick (2020)
- Alice Austen Lived Here (2022)
- Green (2023)
- Chris Makes a Friend (2025)

== Personal life ==
Gino was born and raised in Staten Island, New York, but over the years they have lived in such locations as Philadelphia, Pennsylvania; Brooklyn, New York; Astoria, Queens; Northampton, Massachusetts; and Oakland, California. They have also spent time living in an RV and driving around the country.

Gino is genderqueer and uses they/them pronouns and the gender neutral honorific Mx.
