= Américas Award =

Children's and young adult book award

- Awarded for: Encourage and commend authors, illustrators and publishers who produce quality children’s and young adult books that portray Latin America, the Caribbean, or Latinos in the United States, and to provide teachers with recommendations for classroom use
- Country: United States
- Presented by: Consortium of Latin American Studies Programs, coordinated by Tulane University’s Stone Center for Latin American Studies and Vanderbilt University’s Center for Latin American Studies
- First award: 1993
- Website: claspprograms.org/americasaward

The Américas Award for Children's and Young Adult Literature is literary award presented annually that recognizes high quality "children's and young adult books that portray Latin America, the Caribbean, or Latinos in the United States, and to provide teachers with recommendations for classroom use." It was first awarded in 1993 by the Consortium of Latin American Studies Programs (CLASP). The award is presented annually at a ceremony at the Library of Congress during Hispanic Heritage Month, along with coordinating workshops for teachers.

== History ==
The Américas Award was proposed in 1992 within the Teaching and Outreach Committee of the Consortium of Latin American Studies Programs. Julie Kline, at the University of Wisconsin–Milwaukee, served as the committee chair for the first 3 years of the award and then went on to be the award coordinator for many years. Coordination for the award later moved to Latin American Studies centers at Tulane and Vanderbilt Universities. A full research collection of all winning, honor, and commended titles is kept and maintained by the University of Wisconsin–Milwaukee at the Golda Meir Library.

== Criteria and Eligibility ==
The award judges will evaluate books based on

1. Distinctive literary quality;
2. Cultural contextualization;
3. Exceptional integration of text, illustration and design;
4. Potential for classroom use.

In order to be eligible for the award, a title must meet the following criteria:

- The book must be published in the preceding year.
- The title may be for primary or secondary reading levels.
- Language of publication may be English, Spanish, Portuguese, or any language indigenous to the Americas.
- The book must be published in the United States or by a publisher with offices within the U.S.
- Submissions may be fiction, poetry, folklore, or selected non-fiction.
- A book will only be considered in its first year of publication in the United States. A book originally published in the U.S. in English with a translated edition in a subsequent year will only be eligible the first year of the edition.

== Recipients ==
Américas Award Recipients, Honorable Mentions, and Commended books
Year	Title	Author	Illustrator	Publisher	Result
1993	Vejigante Masquerader	Lulu Delacre	Lulu Delacre	Scholastic	Winner
1993	Abuela's Weave	Omar S. Castañeda	Enrique O. Sánchez	Lee & Low Books	Commended
1993	Celebrating the Hero	Lyll Becerra de Jenkins		Lodestar Books	Commended
1993	For the Life of Laetitia	Merle Hodge		Farrar, Straus & Giroux	Commended
1993	Hue Boy	Rita Phillips Mitchell	Caroline Binch	Dial Press	Commended
1993	The Little Painter of Sabana Grande	Patricia Maloney Markun	Robert Casilla	Bradbury Press	Commended
1993	Radio Man	Arthur Dorros	Arthur Dorros	HarperCollins	Commended
1994	The Mermaid’s Twin Sister	Lynn Joseph		Clarion Books	Winner
1994	Alexandro's Gift	Richard E. Albert	Sylvia Long	Chronicle Books	Commended
1994	Angel's Kite / La estrella de Ángel	Alberto Blanco	Rodolfo Morales	Children's Book Press	Commended
1994	Beyond the Ancient Cities	José María Merino, trans. by Helen Lane		Farrar, Straus & Giroux	Commended
1994	Billy	Laura Roybal		Houghton Mifflin	Commended
1994	The Bossy Gallito: A Traditional Cuban Folk Tale	Lucía M. González	Lulu Delacre	Scholastic	Commended
1994	Caribbean Alphabet	Frané Lessac	Frané Lessac	William Morrow & Company	Commended
1994	Cool Salsa: Bilingual Poems on Growing Up Latino in the United States	Lori Marie Carlson (ed.)		Henry Holt and Company	Commended
1994	A Day's Work	Eve Bunting	Ronald Himler	Clarion Books	Commended
1994	De Colores and Other Latin American Folksongs for Children	Jose-Luis Orozco	Elisa Kleven	Dutton Books	Commended
1994	Feliz Nochebuena, Feliz Navidad	Maricel E. Presilla	Ismael Espinosa Ferrer	Henry Holt and Company	Commended
1994	Las nanas de abuelita / Grandmother's Nursery Rhymes	Nelly Palacio Jaramillo	Elivia Savadier	Henry Holt and Company	Commended
1994	How Music Came to the World: An Ancient Mexican Myth	Hal Ober	Carol Ober	Houghton Mifflin	Commended
1994	How Night Came from the Sea: A Story from Brazil	Mary-Joan Gerson	Carla Golembe	Little, Brown and Company	Commended
1994	The Hummingbird's Gift	Stefan Czernecki and Timothy Rhodes	Juliana Reyes de Silva and Juan Hilario Silva	Hyperion Books	Commended
1994	I Have a News: Rhymes from the Caribbean	Neil Philip (ed.)	Jacqueline Mair	William Morrow & Company	Commended
1994	Imagining Isabel	Omar S. Castañeda		Lodestar Books	Commended
1994	Juan Bobo: Four Folktales from Puerto Rico	Carmen T. Bernier-Grand	Ernesto Ramos Nieves	HarperCollins	Commended
1994	The Legend of the Poinsettia	Tomie dePaola	Tomie dePaola	G. P. Putnam's Sons	Commended
1994	Lights on the River	Jane Resh Thomas	Michael Dooling	Hyperion Books	Commended
1994	Not a Copper Penny in Me House: Poems from the Caribbean	Monica Gunning	Frané Lessac	Boyds Mills Press	Commended
1994	My Two Worlds	Ginger Gordon	Martha Cooper	Clarion Books	Commended
1994	Over Here It's Different: Carolina's Story	Mildred Leinweber Dawson	George Ancona	Macmillan Publishing	Commended
1994	Pablo's Tree	Pat Mora	Cecily Lang	Macmillan Publishing	Commended
1994	Platero y yo / Platero and I	Juan Ramón Jiménez	Antonio Frasconi	Clarion Books	Commended
1994	Ransom for a River Dolphin	Sarita Kendall		Lerner Publishing	Commended
1994	Rata-Pata-Scata-Fata: A Caribbean Story	Phillis Gershator	Holly Meade	Little, Brown and Company	Commended
1994	The Red Comb	Fernando Picó	María Antonia Ordóñez	BridgeWater Books	Commended
1994	Rio Grande Stories	Carolyn Meyer		Harcourt Brace	Commended
1994	The Sad Night: The Story of an Aztec Victory and a Spanish Loss	Sally Schofer Mathews	Sally Schofer Mathews	Clarion Books	Commended
1994	Saturday Market	Patricia Grossman	Enrique O. Sánchez	Lothrop, Lee & Shepard	Commended
1994	The Tale of Rabbit and Coyote	Tony Johnston	Tomie dePaola	G. P. Putnam's Sons	Commended
1994	Tap-Tap	Karen Lynn Williams	Catherine Stock	Clarion Books	Commended
1994	The Tree That Rains: The Flood Myth of the Huichol Indians of Mexico	Emery Bernhard	Durga Bernhard	Holiday House	Commended
1994	Tukama Tootles the Flute: A Tale from the Antilles	Phillis Gershator	Synthia Saint James	Orchard Books	Commended
1994	Voices from the Fields : Children of Migrant Farmworkers Tell Their Stories	S. Beth Atkin		Little, Brown and Company	Commended
1994	Walking Stars: Stories of Magic and Power	Victor Villaseñor		Arte Público Press	Commended
1994	When the Monkeys Came Back	Kristine L. Franklin	Robert Roth	Atheneum Books	Commended
1994	Where the Flame Trees Bloom	Alma Flor Ada	Antonio Martorell	Atheneum Books	Commended
1995	Tonight, by Sea	Frances Temple		Orchard Books	Winner
1995	An Island Like You: Stories of the Barrio	Judith Ortiz Cofer		Orchard Books	Honor
1995	Chato's Kitchen	Gary Soto	Susan Guevara	G. P. Putnam's Sons	Honor
1995	Heart of a Jaguar	Marc Talbert		Simon & Schuster	Honor
1995	Calling the Doves / El canto de las palomas	Juan Felipe Herrera	Elly Simmons	Children's Book Press	Commended
1995	Canto familiar	Gary Soto	Annika Nelson	Harcourt Brace	Commended
1995	A Caribbean Dozen: Poems from Caribbean Poets	John Agard and Grace Nichols (eds.)	Cathie Felstead	Candlewick Press	Commended
1995	Carlos, Light the Farolito	Jean Ciavonne	Donna Clair	Clarion Books	Commended
1995	The Faithful Friend	Robert D. San Souci	Brian Pinkney	Simon & Schuster	Commended
1995	The Farolitos of Christmas	Rudolfo Anaya	Edward Gonzales	Hyperion Books	Commended
1995	Fernando's Gift / El Regalo de Fernando	Douglas Keister	Douglas Keister	Sierra Club Books for Children	Commended
1995	Fiesta U.S.A.	George Ancona	George Ancona	Lodestar Books	Commended
1995	The Gullywasher	Joyce Rossi	Joyce Rossi	Northland Publishing	Commended
1995	Hi	Ann Herbert Scott	Glo Coalson	Philomel Books	Commended
1995	How Iwariwa the Cayman Learned to Share: A Yanomami Myth	George Crespo	George Crespo	Clarion Books	Commended
1995	Indio	Sherry Garland		Harcourt Brace	Commended
1995	Isla / La isla	Arthur Dorros	Arthur Dorros	Dutton Books	Commended
1995	Juan Bobo and the Horse of Seven Colors: a Puerto Rican Legend	Jan Mike	Charles Reasoner	Troll Associates	Commended
1995	The Magic Feather: A Jamaican Legend	Lisa Rojany	Philip Kuznicki	Troll Associates	Commended
1995	Mediopollito / Half-Chicken	Alma Flor Ada	Kim Howard	Doubleday	Commended
1995	My First Book of Proverbs / Mi primer libro de dichos	Ralfka González and Ana Ruiz		Children's Book Press	Commended
1995	Pedro Fools the Gringo and Other Tales of a Latin American Trickster	María Cristina Brusca and Tona Wilson	María Cristina Brusca	Henry Holt and Company	Commended
1995	People of Corn: A Mayan Story	Mary-Joan Gerson	Carla Golembe	Little, Brown and Company	Commended
1996	In My Family / En mi familia	Carmen Lomas Garza	Carmen Lomas Garza	Children's Book Press	Winner
1996	Parrot in the Oven	Victor Martínez		HarperCollins	Winner
1996	Down by the River: Afro-Caribbean Rhymes, Games and Songs for Children	Grace Hallworth	Caroline Binch	Scholastic	Honor
1996	So Loud a Silence	Lyll Becerra de Jenkins		Lodestar Books	Honor
1996	Alphabet City Ballet	Erika Tamar		HarperCollins	Commended
1996	Anthony Reynoso: Born to Rope	Martha Cooper and Ginger Gordon		Clarion Books	Commended
1996	Barrio Streets, Carnival Dreams: Three Generations of Latino Artistry	Lori Marie Carlson		Henry Holt and Company	Commended
1996	A Bear for Miguel	Elaine Marie Alphin	Joan Sandin	HarperCollins	Commended
1996	The Big Idea	Ellen Schecter	Bob Dorsey	Hyperion Books	Commended
1996	La Boda: A Mexican Wedding Celebration	Nancy Van Laan	Andrea Arroyo	Little, Brown and Company	Commended
1996	A Caribbean Counting Book	Faustin Charles	Roberta Arenson	Houghton Mifflin	Commended
1996	Chave's Memories: Los Recuerdos De Chave	María Isabel Delgado	Yvonne Symank	Arte Público Press	Commended
1996	Confetti: Poems For Children	Pat Mora	Enrique O. Sánchez	Lee & Low Books	Commended
1996	Darkfright	Holly Young Huth	Jenny Stow	Atheneum Books	Commended
1996	Elena	Diane Stanley		Hyperion Books	Commended
1996	Firefly Summer	Pura Belpré		Arte Público Press	Commended
1996	The Garden of Happiness	Erika Tamar	Barbara Lambase	Harcourt Brace	Commended
1996	Going Home	Eve Bunting	David Díaz	HarperCollins	Commended
1996	The Golden Flower: A Taino Myth from Puerto Rico	Nina Jaffe	Enrique O. Sánchez	Simon & Schuster	Commended
1996	Golden Tales: Myths, Legends and Folktales from Latin America / De oro y esmeraldas: mitos, leyendas y cuentos popules de latinoamérica	Lulu Delacre		Scholastic	Commended
1996	Good News!	Sarita Chávez Silverman	Melinda Levine	Hampton-Brown	Commended
1996	Hooray, a Piñata!	Elisa Kleven	Elisa Kleven	Dutton Books	Commended
1996	In Rosa's Mexico	Campbell Geeslin	Andrea Arroyo	Alfred A. Knopf	Commended
1996	Jade and Iron: Latin American Tales from Two Cultures	Patricia Aldana (ed.), trans. by Hugh Hazelton	Luis Garay	Groundwood Books / Douglas & McIntyre Ltd	Commended
1996	Jalapeño Bagels	Natasha Wing	Robert Casilla	Atheneum Books	Commended
1997	The Circuit	Francisco Jiménez		University of New Mexico Press	Winner
1997	The Face at the Window	Regina Hanson	Linda Saport	Clarion Books	Winner
1997	Fruits: A Caribbean Counting Poem	Valerie Bloom	David Axtell	Henry Holt and Company	Honor
1997	Mayeros: A Yucatec Maya Family	George Ancona	George Ancona	William Morrow & Company	Honor
1997	Angela Weaves a Dream: The Story of a Young Maya Artist	Michèle Solá	Jeffrey Jay Foxx	Hyperion Books	Commended
1997	Baseball in the Barrios	Henry Horenstein	Henry Horenstein	Gulliver Books / Harcourt Brace	Commended
1997	The Birthday Swap / ¡Qué sorpresa de cumpleaños!	Loretta López	Loretta López	Lee & Low Books	Commended
1997	Buried Onions	Gary Soto		Harcourt Brace	Commended
1997	Butterfly Boy	Virginia Kroll	Gerardo Suzán	Boyds Mills Press	Commended
1997	Carlos and the Skunk / Carlos Y El Zorrillo	Jan Romero Stevens	Jeanne Arnold	Rising Moon	Commended
1997	Celebrate! In Central America	Joe Viesti and Diane Hall	Joe Viesti	Lothrop, Lee & Shepard	Commended
1997	Cocoa Ice	Diana Appelbaum	Holly Meade	Orchard Books	Commended
1997	La Cucaracha Martina: A Caribbean Folktale / Un cuento folklorico del Caribe	Daniel Moretón	Daniel Moretón	Turtle Books	Commended
1997	Cuckoo / Cucu	Lois Ehlert, trans. by Gloria de Aragón Andújar	Lois Ehlert	Harcourt Brace	Commended
1997	Day of the Dead	Tony Johnston	Jeanette Winter	Harcourt Brace	Commended
1997	Dear Abuelita / Querida Abuelita	Sofía Meza Keane	Enrique O. Sánchez	Rigby	Commended
1997	Diez Deditos and Other Play Rhymes and Action Songs from Latin America	Jose-Luis Orozco (ed.)	Elisa Kleven	Dutton Books	Commended
1997	From Father to Son / De padre a hijo	Patricia Almada	Marianno de López	Rigby	Commended
1997	Gathering the Sun: An Alphabet In Spanish And English	Alma Flor Ada	Simón Silva	Lothrop, Lee & Shepard	Commended
1997	Grannie Jus' Come!	Ana Sisnett	Karen Lusebrink	Children's Book Press	Commended
1997	I Am Of Two Places / Soy de dos lugares	Mary Carden and Mary Cappellini (eds.)	Maya Christina González	Rigby	Commended
1997	Laughing Tomatoes and Other Spring Poems / Jitomates Risuenos y Otros Poemas de Primavera	Francisco X. Alarcón	Maya Christina González	Children's Book Press	Commended
1997	A Little Salmon for Witness: A Story from Trinidad	Vashanti Rahaman	Sandra Speidel	Lodestar Books	Commended
1997	The Lizard and the Sun / La lagartija y el sol	Alma Flor Ada	Felipe Dávalos	Doubleday Dell	Commended
1997	Mexico's Marvelous Corn / El maravilloso maíz de México	Margarita González-Jensen	Margarita González-Jensen	Rigby	Commended
1997	Novio Boy	Gary Soto		Harcourt Brace	Commended
1997	Perdito's Day	Luis Garay	Luis Garay	Orchard Books	Commended
1997	Señor Cat's Romance and Other Favorite Stories from Latin America	Lucía M. González	Lulu Delacre	Scholastic	Commended
1997	Spirits of the High Mesa	Floyd Martínez		Arte Público Press	Commended
1997	The Story of Dona Chila / El cuento de Doña Chila	Mary Capellini	Gershom Griffith	Rigby	Commended
1997	Tomás and the Library Lady	Pat Mora	Raúl Colón	Alfred A. Knopf	Commended
1997	Where Fireflies Dance / Ahi, Donde Bailan Las Lucienagas	Lucha Corpi	Mira Reisberg	Children's Book Press	Commended
1997	White Bread Competition	Jo Ann Yolanda Hernández		Piñata Books	Commended
1998	Barrio: José’s Neighborhood	George Ancona	George Ancona	Harcourt Brace	Winner
1998	Mama and Papa Have a Store	Amelia Lau Carling	Amelia Lau Carling	Dial Press	Winner
1998	Cendrillon: A Caribbean Cinderella	Robert D. San Souci	Brian Pinkney	Simon & Schuster	Honor
1998	Big bushy mustache	Gary Soto	Joe Cepeda	Alfred A. Knopf	Commended
1998	Big Moon Tortilla	Dyanne Strongbow		Boyds Mills Press	Commended
1998	Caribbean Dream	Rachel Isadora	Rachel Isadora	G. P. Putnam's Sons	Commended
1998	The Crab Man / El hombre de los cangrejos	Patricia E. Van West	Cedric Lucas	Turtle Books	Commended
1998	Doctor Bird: Three Lookin' Up Tales from Jamaica	Gerald Hausman	Ashley Wolff	Philomel Books	Commended
1998	Fiesta Fireworks	George Ancona	George Ancona	Lothrop, Lee & Shepard	Commended
1998	From the Bellybutton of the Moon: And Other Summer Poems / Del Ombligo de la Luna: Y Otros Poemas de Verano	Francisco X. Alarcón	Maya Christina González	Children's Book Press	Commended
1998	A Gift for Abuelita: Celebrating the Day of the Dead / Un regalo para Abuelita: En celebración del Día de los Muertos	Nancy Luenn	Robert Chapman	Rising Moon	Commended
1998	Greetings, Sun	Phillis Gershator and David Gershator	Synthia Saint James	DK Ink	Commended
1998	Liliana's Grandmothers	Leyla Torres	Leyla Torres	Farrar, Straus & Giroux	Commended
1998	Lolo & Red-legs	Kirk Reeve		Rising Moon	Commended
1998	The Magic Bean Tree: A Legend from Argentina	Nancy Van Laan	Beatriz Vidal	Houghton Mifflin	Commended
1998	La Mariposa	Francisco Jiménez	Simón Silva	Houghton Mifflin	Commended
1998	Marisol and Magdalena: The Sound of Our Sisterhood	Veronica Chambers		Hyperion Books	Commended
1998	Momentos Magicos: Tales from Latin America Told in English and Spanish	Olga Loya		August House	Commended
1998	Petty Crimes	Gary Soto		Harcourt Brace	Commended
1998	The Secret Stars	Joseph Slate	Felipe Dávalos	Marshall Cavendish	Commended
1998	Tío Armando	Florence Parry Heide and Roxanne Heide Pierce	Ann Grifalconi	Lothrop, Lee & Shepard	Commended
1998	Under The Royal Palms: A Childhood in Cuba	Alma Flor Ada		Atheneum Books	Commended
1999	CrashBoomLove	Juan Felipe Herrera		University of New Mexico Press	Winner
1999	Cuba: After the Revolution	Bernard Wolff		Dutton Books	Honor
1999	Magic Windows / Ventanas mágicas	Carmen Lomas Garza, trans. by Francisco X. Alarcón	Carmen Lomas Garza	Children's Book Press	Honor
1999	A Is for the Americas	Cynthia Chin-Lee and Terri de la Peña	Enrique O. Sánchez	Orchard Books	Commended
1999	Angels Ride Bikes: And Other Fall Poems / Los Angeles Andan en Bicicleta: Y Otros Poemas de Otoño	Francisco X. Alarcón	Maya Christina González	Children's Book Press	Commended
1999	Asphalt Angels	Ineke Holtwijk, trans. by Wanda Boeke		Front Street Press	Commended
1999	Carnaval	George Ancona	George Ancona	Harcourt Brace	Commended
1999	Erandi's Braids	Antonio Hernández Madrigal	Tomie dePaola	G. P. Putnam's Sons	Commended
1999	I'm José and I'm Okay: Three Stories from Bolivia	Werner Holzwarth, trans. by Laura McKenna	Yatiyawi Studios	Kane/Miller	Commended
1999	Island in the Sun	Harry Belafonte and Lord Burgess	Alex Ayliffe	Dial Press	Commended
1999	It Doesn't Have to Be This Way: A Barrio Story / No tiene que ser asi: Una historia del barrio	Luis J. Rodríguez	Daniel Galvez	Children's Book Press	Commended
1999	Two Days in May	Harriet Peck Taylor	Leyla Torres	Farrar, Straus & Giroux	Commended
2000	The Color of My Words	Lynn Joseph		HarperCollins	Winner
2000	The Composition	Antonio Skármeta	Alfonso Ruano	Groundwood Books	Winner
2000	Esperanza Rising	Pam Muñoz Ryan		Scholastic	Honor
2000	My Very Own Room / Mi propio cuarto	Amada Irma Pérez	Maya Christina González	Children's Book Press	Honor
2000	The Christmas Gift / El regalo de Navidad	Francisco Jiménez	Claire B. Cotts	Houghton Mifflin	Commended
2000	Cuban Kids	George Ancona	George Ancona	Marshall Cavendish	Commended
2000	Icy Watermelon / Sandia Fria	Mary Sue Galindo	Pauline Rodriguez Howard	Piñata Books, Arte Público Press	Commended
2000	Mi Hija, Mi Hijo, El Aguila, La Paloma: Un Canto Azteca / My Daughter, My Son, the Eagle, the Dove: An Aztec Chant	Ana Castillo	Susan Guevara	Dutton Books	Commended
2000	Pedro and Me: Friendship, Loss, and What I Learned	Judd Winick	Judd Winick	Henry Holt and Company	Commended
2000	Roadrunner's Dance	Rudolfo Anaya	David Díaz	Hyperion Books	Commended
2000	Salsa Stories	Lulu Delacre	Lulu Delacre	Scholastic	Commended
2001	A Movie in My Pillow / Una película en mi almohada	Jorge Argueta	Elizabeth Gómez	Children's Book Press	Winner
2001	Breaking Through	Francisco Jiménez		Houghton Mifflin	Winner
2001	In the Days of the Vaqueros: America's First True Cowboys	Russell Freedman		Clarion Books	Honor
2001	Harvest	George Ancona	George Ancona	Marshall Cavendish	Commended
2001	Iguanas in the Snow and Other Winter Poems	Francisco X. Alarcón	Maya Christina González	Children's Book Press	Commended
2001	The Jumping Tree	René Saldaña, Jr.		Delacorte Press	Commended
2001	Mama Does The Mambo	Katherine Leiner	Edel Rodríguez	Hyperion Books	Commended
2001	Uncle Rain Cloud	Tony Johnston	Fabricio Vanden Broeck	Charlesbridge	Commended
2002	Before We Were Free	Julia Alvarez		Alfred A. Knopf	Winner
2002	Behind the Mountains	Edwidge Danticat		Orchard Books	Honor
2002	Frida	Jonah Winter	Ana Juan	Scholastic	Honor
2002	Flight to Freedom	Ana Veciana-Suarez		Orchard Books	Commended
2002	Grandma and Me at the Flea / Los Meros Meros Remateros	Juan Felipe Herrera	Anita DeLucio-Brock	Children's Book Press	Commended
2002	I love Saturdays y domingos	Alma Flor Ada	Elivia Savadier	Atheneum Books	Commended
2002	A Library for Juana	Pat Mora	Beatriz Vidal	Alfred A. Knopf	Commended
2002	Me in the Middle	Ana Maria Machado, trans. by David Unger	Caroline Merola	Groundwood Books	Commended
2002	Messengers of Rain and Other Poems from Latin America	Claudia M. Lee (ed.)	Rafael Yockteng	Groundwood Books	Commended
2002	My Diary From Here to There / Mi diario de aqui hasta alla	Amada Irma Pérez	Maya Christina González	Children's Book Press	Commended
2002	The Pot That Juan Built	Nancy Andrews-Goebel	David Díaz	Lee & Low Books	Commended
2003	Just a Minute	Yuyi Morales	Yuyi Morales	Chronicle Books	Winner
2003	The Meaning of Consuelo	Judith Ortiz Cofer		Farrar, Straus & Giroux	Winner
2003	Cuba 15	Nancy Osa		Delacorte Press	Honor
2003	Harvesting Hope: The Story of Cesar Chavez	Kathleen Krull	Yuyi Morales	Harcourt	Honor
2003	The Afterlife	Gary Soto		Harcourt	Commended
2003	The Journey of Tunuri and the Blue Deer	James Endredy	María Hernández de la Cruz and Casimiro de la Cruz López	Bear Cub Books	Commended
2003	The Little Blue House	Sandra Comino		Groundwood Books	Commended
2003	Murals: Walls that Sing	George Ancona	George Ancona	Marshall Cavendish	Commended
2003	Xochitl and the Flowers / Xochitl, la Nina de las flores	Jorge Argueta	Carl Angel	Children's Book Press	Commended
2004	My Name is Celia / Me llamo Celia	Monica Brown	Rafael López	Luna Rising	Winner
2004	Sammy & Juliana in Hollywood	Benjamin Alire Sáenz		Cinco Puntos Press	Winner
2004	Call Me María	Judith Ortiz Cofer		Orchard Books	Honor
2004	Becoming Naomi León	Pam Muñoz Ryan		Scholastic	Commended
2004	The Dream on Blanca’s Wall / El sueño pegado en la pared de Blanca	Jane Medina	Robert Casilla	Boyds Mills Press	Commended
2004	Elena's Serenade	Campbell Geeslin	Ana Juan	Atheneum Books	Commended
2004	The Remembering Stone	Barbara Timberlake Russell	Claire B. Cotts	Farrar, Straus & Giroux	Commended
2004	The Santero's Miracle	Rudolfo Anaya	Amy Córdova	University of New Mexico Press	Commended
2004	Sélavi, That is Life: A Haitian Story of Hope	Youme	Youme	Cinco Puntos Press	Commended
2005	Cinnamon Girl: letters found inside a cereal box	Juan Felipe Herrera		Joanna Cotler Books, HarperCollins	Winner
2005	A Season for Mangoes	Regina Hanson	Eric Velasquez	Clarion Books	Honor
2005	The Tequila Worm	Viola Canales		Random House	Honor
2005	Julio's Magic	Arthur Dorros	Ann Grifalconi	HarperCollins	Commended
2005	Lucha Libre: The Man in the Silver Mask	Xavier Garza	Xavier Garza	Cinco Puntos Press	Commended
2005	Red Hot Salsa: Bilingual Poems on Being Young and Latino in the United States	Lori Marie Carlson		Henry Holt and Company	Commended
2005	Red Ridin' in the Hood and Other Cuentos	Patricia Santos Marcantonio	Renato Alarcão	Farrar, Straus & Giroux	Commended
2005	Roberto Clemente: Pride of the Pittsburgh Pirates	Jonah Winter	Raúl Colón	Atheneum Books	Commended
2005	Sawdust Carpets / Alfombras de aserrín	Amelia Lau Carling	Amelia Lau Carling	Groundwood Books	Commended
2006	Josias, Hold the Book	Jennifer Elvgren	Nicole Tadgell	Boyds Mills Press	Winner
2006	The Poet Slave of Cuba	Margarita Engle	Sean Qualls	Henry Holt and Company	Winner
2006	What the Moon Saw	Laura Resau		Delacorte Press	Honor
2006	Behind the Eyes	Francisco X. Stork		Dutton Books	Commended
2006	Call Me Henri	Lorraine M. López		Curbstone Press	Commended
2006	Crossing the Wire	Will Hobbs		HarperCollins	Commended
2006	El Lector	William Durbin		Random House	Commended
2006	La fiesta de las tortillas / La Fiesta de Las Tortillas	Jorge Argueta; Joe Hayes and Sharon Franco (trs.)	María Jesús Álvarez	Santillana	Commended
2006	The Honey Jar	Rigoberta Menchú with Dante Liano	Domi	Groundwood Books	Commended
2006	Letters to My Mother	Teresa Cárdenas		Groundwood Books	Commended
2006	La Línea	Ann Jaramillo		Roaring Brook Press	Commended
2006	My Feet Are Laughing	Lissette Norman	Frank Morrison	Farrar, Straus & Giroux	Commended
2006	My Little Car	Gary Soto	Pam Paparone	G. P. Putnam's Sons	Commended
2006	Napí va a la montaña	Antonio Ramírez	Domi	Groundwood Books	Commended
2006	Surprising Cecilia	Susan Gonzales Abraham and Denise Gonzales Abraham		Cinco Puntos Press	Commended
2006	Talking with Mother Earth / Hablando con madre tierra	Jorge Argueta	Lucía Angela Pérez	Groundwood Books	Commended
2006	To Go Singing Through the World: The Childhood of Pablo Neruda	Deborah Kogan Ray		Farrar, Straus & Giroux	Commended
2007–2008	Red Glass	Laura Resau		Delacorte Press	Winner
2007–2008	¡Yum! ¡MmMm! ¡Que Rico!: America’s Sproutings	Pat Mora	Rafael López	Lee & Low Books	Winner
2007–2008	Nochecita / Little Night	Yuyi Morales	Yuyi Morales	Roaring Brook Press	Honor
2007–2008	Raining Sardines	Enrique Flores-Galbis		Roaring Brook Press	Honor
2007–2008	Abuelita, Full of Life / Abuelita, Ilena de Vida	Amy Costales	Martha Avilés	Luna Rising	Commended
2007–2008	Alfredito regresa volando a su casa / Alfredito Flies Home	Jorge Argueta	Luis Garay	Groundwood Books	Commended
2007–2008	Angelina's Island	Jeanette Winter	Jeanette Winter	Frances Foster Books, Farrar, Straus & Giroux	Commended
2007–2008	Capoeira: Game! Dance! Martial Art!	George Ancona	George Ancona	Lee & Low Books	Commended
2007–2008	A Caribbean Journey from A to Y: Read and Discover What Happened to the Z	Mario Picayo	Earleen Griswold	Campanita	Commended
2007–2008	Come Look with Me: Latin American Art	Kimberly Lane		Charlesbridge	Commended
2007–2008	Frida: ¡Viva la Vida! Long Live Life!	Carmen T. Bernier-Grand		Marshall Cavendish	Commended
2007–2008	Hip, Hip, Hooray, It's Monsoon Day! / ¡Ajua, Ya Llego El Chubasco!	Roni Capin Rivera-Ashford	Richard Johnson	Arizona-Sonora Desert Museum Press	Commended
2007–2008	Martina the Beautiful Cockroach: A Cuban Folktale / Martina Una Cucarachita Muy Linda: Un Cuento Cubano	Carmen Agra Deedy	Michael Austin	Peachtree	Commended
2007–2008	My Colors, My World / Mis Colores, Mi Mundo	Maya Christina González	Maya Christina González	Children's Book Press	Commended
2007–2008	My Name Is Gabito: The Life of Gabriel Garcia Marquez / Me llamo Gabit: La vida de Gabriel García Márquez	Monica Brown	Raúl Colón	Luna Rising	Commended
2007–2008	N is for Navidad	Susan Middleton Elya and Merry Banks	Joe Cepeda	Chronicle Books	Commended
2007–2008	Nana's Big Surprise / Nana, ¡Qué Sorpresa!	Amada Irma Pérez	Maya Christina González	Children's Book Press	Commended
2007–2008	Old Dog	Teresa Cárdenas, trans. by David Unger		Groundwood Books	Commended
2007–2008	Sacred Leaf	Deborah Ellis		Groundwood Books	Commended
2007–2008	A Small Nativity	Aquiles Nazoa, trans. by Hugh Hazelton	Ana Palmero Cáceres	Groundwood Books	Commended
2007–2008	Touching Snow	M. Sindy Felin		Atheneum Books	Commended
2007–2008	Tricycle	Elisa Amado	Alfonso Ruano	Groundwood Books	Commended
2009	Just in Case: A Trickster Tale and Spanish Alphabet Book	Yuyi Morales	Yuyi Morales	Roaring Brook Press	Winner
2009	The Surrender Tree: Poems of Cuba's Struggle for Freedom	Margarita Engle		Henry Holt and Company	Winner
2009	The Best Gift of All: The Legend of La Vieja Belén / El mejor regalo del mundo: La leyenda de la vieja belén	Julia Alvarez	Ruddy Nuñez	Alfaguara / Santillana	Honor
2009	Dark Dude	Oscar Hijuelos		Atheneum Books	Honor
2009	The Storyteller’s Candle / La velita de los cuentos	Lucía M. González	Lulu Delacre	Children's Book Press	Honor
2009	Animal Poems of the Iguazú / Animalario del Iguazú	Francisco X. Alarcón	Maya Christina González	Children's Book Press	Commended
2009	Arco Iris de Poesía: Poemas de las Américas y España	Sergio Andricaín (ed.)	Olga Cuéllar	Lectorum Publications	Commended
2009	Baila, Nana, Baila / Dance, Nana, Dance: Cuban Folktales in English and Spanish	Joe Hayes	Mauricio Trenard Sayago	Cinco Puntos Press	Commended
2009	Cesar Chavez: Crusader for Social Change	Brenda Haugen		Compass Point Books	Commended
2009	The Disappeared	Gloria Whelan		Dial Press / Penguin	Commended
2009	Divali Rose	Vashanti Rahaman	Jamel Akib	Boyds Mills Press	Commended
2009	Dolores Huerta: Labor Leader and Civil Rights Activist	Robin S. Doak		Compass Point Books	Commended
2009	Down to the Bone	Mayra Lazara Dole		HarperCollins	Commended
2009	Facts of Life	Gary Soto		Harcourt	Commended
2009	He Forgot to Say Goodbye	Benjamin Alire Sáenz		Simon & Schuster	Commended
2009	Kitchen Dance	Maurie J. Manning	Maurie J. Manning	Clarion Books	Commended
2009	Pablo (Cuando los Grandes Eran Pequeños)	Georgina Lázaro	Marcela Donoso	Lectorum Publications	Commended
2009	PeaceJam: A Billion Simple Acts of Peace	Ivan Suvanjieff and Dawn Gifford Engle		Puffin / Penguin	Commended
2009	A Perfect Season for Dreaming / Un tiempo perfecto para soñar	Benjamin Alire Sáenz	Esau Andrade Valencia	Cinco Puntos Press	Commended
2009	Reaching Out	Francisco Jiménez		Houghton Mifflin	Commended
2009	The Secret Legacy	Rigoberta Menchú with Dante Liano	Domi	Groundwood Books	Commended
2009	The Smell of Old Lady Perfume	Claudia Guadalupe Martinez		Cinco Puntos Press	Commended
2009	Voices in First Person: Reflections on Latino Identity	Lori Marie Carlson (ed.)	Manuel Rivera-Ortiz, Flavio Morais	Atheneum Books	Commended
2009	The Walls of Cartagena	Julia Durango	Tom Pohrt	Simon & Schuster	Commended
2009	What Can You Do With a Rebozo?	Carmen Tafolla	Amy Córdova	Tricycle Press	Commended
2010	Return to Sender	Julia Alvarez		Alfred A. Knopf	Winner
2010	What Can You Do With a Paleta? / ¿Qué puedes hacer con una paleta?	Carmen Tafolla	Magaly Morales	Tricycle Press	Winner
2010	Gringolandia	Lyn Miller-Lachmann		Curbstone Press	Honor
2010	I Know the River Loves Me / Yo sé que el río me ama	Maya Christina González	Maya Christina González	Children's Book Press	Honor
2010	My Papa Diego and Me: Memories of My Father and His Art / Mi pap Diego y yo: Recuerdos de mi padre y su arte	Guadalupe Rivera Marín and Diego Rivera		Children's Book Press	Honor
2010	Before Columbus: The Americas of 1491	Charles C. Mann		Atheneum Books	Commended
2010	Book Fiesta! Celebrate Children's Day/Book Day / Celebremos El día de los niños/El día de los libros	Pat Mora	Rafael López	HarperCollins / Rayo	Commended
2010	Braids / Trencitas	Kathleen Contreras	Margaret Lindmark	Lectorum Publications	Commended
2010	Confetti Girl	Diana López		Little, Brown and Company	Commended
2010	Diego: Bigger Than Life	Carmen T. Bernier-Grand	David Díaz	Marshall Cavendish	Commended
2010	The Fiesta Dress: A Quinceañera Tale	Caren McNelly McCormack	Martha Avilés	Marshall Cavendish	Commended
2010	Grandmother, Have the Angels Come?	Denise Vega	Erin Eitter Kono	Little, Brown and Company	Commended
2010	Jorge Luis Borges	Georgina Lázaro	Graciela Genovés	Lectorum Publications	Commended
2010	Journey of Dreams	Marge Pellegrino		Frances Lincoln Children's Books	Commended
2010	Marcelo in the Real World	Francisco X. Stork		Arthur A. Levine Books	Commended
2010	Muchacho	LouAnne Johnson		Alfred A. Knopf	Commended
2010	My Abuelita	Tony Johnston	Yuyi Morales	Harcourt	Commended
2010	Pelé King of Soccer / Pelé el rey del fútbol	Monica Brown	Rudy Gutiérrez	Rayo	Commended
2010	A Piñata in a Pine Tree: A Latino Twelve Days of Christmas	Pat Mora	Magaly Morales	Clarion Books	Commended
2010	René has Two Last Names / René tiene dos apellidos	René Colato Laínez	Fabiola Graullera Ramírez	Arte Público Press	Commended
2010	Sonia Sotomayor: A Judge Grows in the Bronx / Sonia Sotomayor: la juez que creció en el Bronx	Jonah Winter	Edel Rodríguez	Atheneum Books	Commended
2010	Sopa de frijoles / Bean Soup	Jorge Argueta	Rafael Yockteng	Groundwood Books	Commended
2010	Tan to Tamarind	Malathi Michelle Iyengar	Jamel Akib	Children's Book Press	Commended
2010	Tropical Secrets: Holocaust Refugees in Cuba	Margarita Engle		Henry Holt and Company	Commended
2010	Victoria Goes to Brazil	Maria de Fatima Campos	Maria de Fatima Campos	Frances Lincoln Children's Books	Commended
2010	We Were Here	Matt de la Peña		Delacorte Press	Commended
2011	Clemente!	Willie Perdomo	Bryan Collier	Henry Holt and Company	Winner
2011	The Dreamer	Pam Muñoz Ryan	Peter Sís	Henry Holt and Company	Winner
2011	The Firefly Letters	Margarita Engle		Henry Holt and Company	Honor
2011	Arroz con Leche: Un poema para cocinar / Rice Pudding: A Cooking Poem	Jorge Argueta	Fernando Vilela	Groundwood Books	Commended
2011	Biblioburro: A True Story from Colombia	Jeanette Winter	Jeanette Winter	Beach Lane	Commended
2011	César Chávez: A Photographic Essay	Ilan Stavans		Cinco Puntos Press	Commended
2011	Dear Primo	Duncan Tonatiuh	Duncan Tonatiuh	Abrams Books	Commended
2011	Dizzy in your Eyes: Poems about Love	Pat Mora		Alfred A. Knopf	Commended
2011	Eight Days: A Story of Haiti	Edwidge Danticat	Alix Delinois	Orchard Books	Commended
2011	Fiesta Babies	Carmen Tafolla	Amy Córdova	Tricycle Press	Commended
2011	From North to South / Del norte al Sur	René Colato Laínez	Joe Cepeda	Children's Book Press	Commended
2011	Grandma's Gift	Eric Velasquez	Eric Velásquez	Bloomsbury	Commended
2011	How Tía Lola Learned to Teach	Julia Alvarez		Alfred A. Knopf	Commended
2011	The Last Summer of the Death Warriors	Francisco X. Stork		Scholastic	Commended
2011	Me, Frida	Amy Novesky	David Díaz	Abrams Books	Commended
2011	Napí funda un pueblo / Napí Makes a Village	Antonio Ramírez	Domi	Groundwood Books	Commended
2011	Ole! Flamenco	George Ancona	George Ancona	Lee & Low Books	Commended
2011	Star in the Forest	Laura Resau		Delacorte Press	Commended
2012	Hurricane Dancers	Margarita Engle		Henry Holt and Company	Winner
2012	Pablo Neruda: Poet of the People	Monica Brown	Julie Paschkis	Henry Holt and Company	Winner
2012	Under the Mesquite	Guadalupe García McCall	David Díaz	Lee & Low Books	Honor
2012	The Queen of Water	Laura Resau and María Virginia Farinango		Delacorte Press	Honor
2012	Sylvia and Aki	Winifred Conkling		Tricycle Press	Commended
2013	The Revolution of Evelyn Serrano	Sonia Manzano		Scholastic	Winner
2013	Martín de Porres, the Rose in the Desert	Gary D. Schmidt	David Díaz	Clarion Books	Honor
2013	Aristotle and Dante Discover the Secrets of the Universe	Benjamin Alire Sáenz		Simon & Schuster	Commended
2013	Drummer Boy of John John	Mark Greenwood	Frané Lessac	Lee & Low Books	Commended
2013	In Darkness	Nick Lake		Bloomsbury	Commended
2014	Parrots Over Puerto Rico	Cindy Trumbore	Susan L. Roth	Lee & Low Books	Winner
2014	Diego Rivera: An Artist for the People	Susan Goldman Rubin		Abrams Books	Honor
2014	Pancho Rabbit and the Coyote	Duncan Tonatiuh	Duncan Tonatiuh	Abrams Books	Honor
2014	Yaqui Delgado Wants to Kick Your Ass	Meg Medina		Candlewick Press	Commended
2014	Maria Had A Little Llama / María Tenía Una Llamita	Angela Dominguez	Angela Dominguez	Henry Holt and Company	Commended
2014	Tito Puente, Mambo King / Tito Puente, Rey del Mambo	Monica Brown	Rafael López	Rayo	Commended
2014	The Lightning Dreamer: Cuba’s Greatest Abolitionist	Margarita Engle		Houghton Mifflin Harcourt	Commended
2014	Enrique's Journey	Sonia Nazario		Delacorte Press	Commended
2014	Round Is a Tortilla	Roseanne Greenfield Thong	John Parra	Chronicle Books	Commended
2014	Serafina's Promise	Ann E. Burg		Scholastic	Commended
2015	Separate is Never Equal: Sylvia Mendez & Her Family's Fight for Desegregation	Duncan Tonatiuh	Duncan Tonatiuh	Abrams Books	Winner
2015	Silver People: Voices from the Panama Canal	Margarita Engle		Houghton Mifflin Harcourt	Winner
2015	Migrant	José Manuel Mateo	Javier Martínez Pedro	Abrams Books	Honor
2015	Strike! The Farm Workers’ Fight for their Rights	Larry Dane Brimner		Calkins Creek	Honor
2015	A de Activista	Martha E. Gonzalez	Innosanto Nagara	Triangle Square	Commended
2015	Abuelo	Arthur Dorros	Raúl Colón	HarperCollins	Commended
2015	Caminar	Skila Brown		Candlewick Press	Commended
2015	Dalia's Wondrous Hair / El cabello maravillosa de Dalia	Laura Lacámara	Laura Lacámara	Piñata Books	Commended
2015	Frida & Diego: Art, Love, Life	Catherine Reef		Clarion Books	Commended
2015	Gabi, a Girl in Pieces	Isabel Quintero		Cinco Puntos Press	Commended
2015	Green Is a Chile Pepper: A Book of Colors	Roseanne Greenfield Thong	John Parra	Chronicle Books	Commended
2015	I Lived on Butterfly Hill	Marjorie Agosín		Atheneum Books	Commended
2015	Letters from Heaven / Cartas del Cielo	Lydia Gil		Arte Público Press	Commended
2015	Lowriders in Space	Cathy Camper	Raúl the Third	Chronicle Books	Commended
2015	Portraits of Hispanic American Heroes	Juan Felipe Herrera	Raúl Colón	Dial Press	Commended
2015	The Secret Side of Empty	Maria E. Andreu		Running Press	Commended
2015	‘Twas Nochebuena	Roseanne Greenfield Thong	Sara Palacios	Viking Press	Commended
2016	Echo	Pam Muñoz Ryan		Scholastic	Winner
2016	Out of Darkness	Ashley Hope Pérez		Carolrhoda Lab	Winner
2016	Funny Bones: Posada and His Day of the Dead Calaveras	Duncan Tonatiuh	Duncan Tonatiuh	Abrams Books	Honor
2016	Growing Up Pedro: How the Martinez Brothers Made it from the Dominican Republic All the Way to the Major Leagues	Matt Tavares	Matt Tavares	Candlewick Press	Honor
2016	A Handful of Stars	Cynthia Lord		Scholastic	Commended
2016	Dream Things True	Marie Marquardt		St. Martin's Griffin	Commended
2016	Drum Dream Girl: How One Girl's Courage Changed Music	Margarita Engle	Rafael López	Houghton Mifflin Harcourt	Commended
2016	Enchanted Air: Two Cultures, Two Wings: A Memoir	Margarita Engle	Edel Rodríguez	Atheneum Books	Commended
2016	Finding the Music / En pos de la música	Jennifer Torres	Renato Alarcão	Lee & Low Books	Commended
2016	Island Treasures	Alma Flor Ada	Edel Rodríguez	Atheneum Books	Commended
2016	Maya's Blanket / La manta de Maya	Monica Brown	David Díaz	Lee & Low Books	Commended
2016	My Tata's Remedies / Los remedios de mi tata	Roni Capin Rivera-Ashford	Antonio Castro L.	Cinco Puntos Press	Commended
2016	Salsa: Un poema para cocinar / A Cooking Poem	Jorge Argueta, trans. by Elisa Amado	Duncan Tonatiuh	Groundwood Books	Commended
2016	The Jumbies	Tracey Baptiste		Algonquin Books	Commended
2016	The Lightning Queen	Laura Resau		Scholastic	Commended
2016	Two White Rabbits	Jairo Buitrago	Rafael Yockteng	Groundwood Books	Commended
2017	The Only Road	Alexandra Diaz		Simon & Schuster	Winner
2017	Ada's Violin	Susan Hood	Sally Wern Comport	Simon & Schuster	Winner
2017	Malaika's Costume	Nadia L. Hohn	Irene Luxbacher	Groundwood Books	Honor
2017	The Distance Between Us	Reyna Grande		Simon & Schuster	Honor
2017	Burn Baby Burn	Meg Medina		Candlewick Press	Commended
2017	Juana & Lucas	Juana Medina	Juana Medina	Candlewick Press	Commended
2017	Lion Island	Margarita Engle		Simon & Schuster	Commended
2017	Lowriders to the Center of the Earth	Cathy Camper	Raúl the Third	Chronicle Books	Commended
2017	Mamá the Alien / Mamá La Extraterrestre	René Colato Laínez	Laura Lacámara	Children's Book Press	Commended
2017	Margarito's Forest / El Bosque de Don Margarito	Andy Carter	Allison Havens	Hard Ball Press	Commended
2017	Radiant Child: The Story of Young Artist Jean-Michel Basquiat	Javaka Steptoe	Javaka Steptoe	Hachette	Commended
2017	Rainbow Weaver / Tejedora del arcoirís	Linda Elovitz Marshall	Elisa Chavarri	Children's Book Press, Lee & Low Books	Commended
2017	Shame the Stars	Guadalupe García McCall		Lee & Low Books	Commended
2017	Somos Como Los Nubes / We are Like the Clouds	Jorge Argueta	Alfonso Ruano	Groundwood Books	Commended
2017	The Memory of Light	Francisco X. Stork		Arthur A. Levine Books / Scholastic	Commended
2017	The Princess and the Warrior	Duncan Tonatiuh	Duncan Tonatiuh	Abrams Books	Commended
2017	The School the Aztec Eagles Built	Dorinda Makanaōnalani Nicholson		Lee & Low Books	Commended
2018	American Street	Ibi Zoboi		HarperCollins	Winner
2018	Danza!: Amalia Hernández and el Ballet Folklórico de México	Duncan Tonatiuh	Duncan Tonatiuh	Abrams Books	Winner
2018	All the Way to Havana	Margarita Engle	Mike Curato	Godwin Books, Henry Holt and Company	Honor
2018	Lucky Broken Girl	Ruth Behar		Penguin Random House	Honor
2018	Bravo! Poems About Amazing Hispanics	Margarita Engle	Rafael López	Godwin Books, Henry Holt and Company	Commended
2018	Disappeared	Francisco X. Stork		Arthur A. Levine Books	Commended
2018	The Epic Fail of Arturo Zamora	Pablo Cartaya		Penguin Random House	Commended
2018	Forest World	Margarita Engle		Atheneum Books	Commended
2018	Frida Kahlo and Her Animalitos	Monica Brown	John Parra	NorthSouth Books	Commended
2018	Lucía the Luchadora	Cynthia Leonor Garza	Alyssa Bermudez	Pow Kids Books	Commended
2018	Martí’s Song for Freedom / Martí y sus Versos por la Libertad	Emma Otheguy	Beatriz Vidal	Children's Book Press	Commended
2018	Rubén Darío	Georgina Lázaro	Lonnie Ruiz	Lectorum Publications	Commended
2018	Sing, Don't Cry	Angela Dominguez	Angela Dominguez	Henry Holt and Company	Commended
2018	The First Rule of Punk	Celia C. Pérez		Penguin Random House	Commended
2018	The Inexplicable Logic of My Life	Benjamin Alire Sáenz		Clarion Books	Commended
2018	The Little Doctor / El Doctorcito	Juan J. Guerra	Victoria Castillo	Piñata Books	Commended
2018	Little Skeletons Countdown to Midnight / Esqueletitos: Un Libro Para Contar En EL Día De Los Muertos	Susie Jaramillo	Susie Jaramillo	Canticos	Commended
2019	Islandborn	Junot Díaz	Leo Espinosa	Dial Press	Winner
2019	Undocumented: A Worker's Fight	Duncan Tonatiuh	Duncan Tonatiuh	Abrams Books	Winner
2019	Auntie Luce's Talking Paintings	Francie Latour	Ken Daley	Groundwood Books	Honor
2019	The Poet X	Elizabeth Acevedo		HarperCollins	Honor
2019	Alma and How She Got Her Name	Juana Martinez-Neal	Juana Martinez-Neal	Candlewick Press	Commended
2019	Carmela Full of Wishes	Matt de la Peña	Christian Robinson	G. P. Putnam's Sons	Commended
2019	Dreamers	Yuyi Morales	Yuyi Morales	Neal Porter Books	Commended
2019	La Frontera: My Journey with Papá	Deborah Mills & Alfredo Alva	Claudia Navarro	Barefoot Books	Commended
2019	A Gift from Abuela	Cecilia Ruiz	Cecilia Ruiz	Candlewick Press	Commended
2019	Jazz Owls	Margarita Engle		Atheneum Books	Commended
2019	Marcus Vega Doesn't Speak Spanish	Pablo Cartaya		Viking Press	Commended
2019	Merci Suárez Changes Gears	Meg Medina		Candlewick Press	Commended
2019	The Photographic Life of Graciela Iturbide	Isabel Quintero	Zeke Peña	Abrams Books	Commended
2019	Puerto Rico Strong: A Comics Anthology Supporting Puerto Rico Disaster	Vita Ayala, Hazel Newlevant and Desiree Rodriguez (eds.)		Lion Forge Comics	Commended
2019	They Call Me Güero: A Border Kid's Poems	David Bowles		Cinco Puntos Press	Commended
2019	When Angels Sing: The Story of Rock Legend Carlos Santana	Michael Mahin	Jose Ramirez	Atheneum Books	Commended
2020	Beast Rider	Tony Johnston and Maria Elena Fontanot De Rhoads		Amulet Books	Winner
2020	Between Us and Abuela	Mitali Perkins	Sara Palacios	Farrar Straus Giroux	Winner
2020	My Papi has a Motorcycle	Isabel Quintero	Zeke Peña	Penguin Young Readers Group	Honor
2020	The Moon Within	Aida Salazar		Arthur A. Levine Books	Honor
2020	The Other Half of Happy	Rebecca Balcárcel		Chronicle Books	Honor
2020	Along the Tapajós	Fernando Vilela, trans. buy Daniel Hahn	Fernando Vilela	Amazon Crossing Kids	Commended
2020	A New Home	Tania de Regil	Tania de Regil	Candlewick Press	Commended
2020	Caravan to the North	Jorge Argueta		Groundwood Books	Commended
2020	Freedom Soup	Tami Charles	Jacqueline Alcántara	Candlewick Press	Commended
2020	Fuego Fuegito/ Fire, Little Fire/ Tit, Titchin	Jorge Tetl Argueta	Felipe Ugalde Alcántara	Piñata Books	Commended
2020	Planting Stories: The Life of Librarian and Storyteller Pura Belpré	Anika Aldamuy Denise	Paola Escobar Harper	HarperCollins	Commended
2020	Soldier for Equality: José de la Luz Sáenz and the Great War	Duncan Tonatiuh	Duncan Tonatiuh	Abrams Books for Young Readers	Commended
2020	The Other Side: Stories of Central American Teen Refugees Who Dream of Crossing the Border	Juan Pablo Villalobos		Farrar, Straus and Giroux	Commended
2020	Titanosaur	José Luis Carballido and Diego Pol	Florencia Gigena	Orchard Books	Commended
2021	Digging for Words	Angela Burke Kunkel	Paola Escobar	Schwartz & Wade	Winner
2021	Land of the Cranes	Aida Salazar		Scholastic	Winner
2021	Furia	Yamile Saied Mendez		Algonquin Press	Honor
2021	If Dominican Were a Color	Sili Recio	Brianna McCarthy	Denene Millner Books	Honor
2021	Vamos! Let's Go Eat	Raúl the Third	Elaine Bay	Versify	Honor
2022	Child of the Flower-Song People	Gloria Amescua	Duncan Tonatiuh	Abrams ComicArts	Winner
2022	My Two Border Towns	David Bowles	Erika Meza	Kokila	Winner
2022	Barefoot Dreams of Petra Luna	Alda P. Dobbs		Sourcebooks Young Readers	Honor
2022	Niños: Poems for the Lost Children of Chile	María José Ferrada	María Elena Valdez	Eerdmans Books for Young Readers	Honor
2022	The Last Cuentista	Donna Barba Higuera		Levine Querido	Honor
2022	ABC El Salvador	Holly Ayala	Elizabeth Gómez	Luna's Press Books	Commended
2022	Aqui era el paraiso/Here Was Paradise	Humberto Akʼabal	Amelia Lau Carling	Groundwood Books	Commended
2022	Coquí in the City	Nomar Perez	Nomar Perez	Dial Books	Commended
2022	Isabel and Her Colores Go to School	Alexandra Alessandri	Courtney Dawson	Sleeping Bear Press	Commended
2022	Lotería	Karla Arenas Valenti	Dana SanMar	Knopf Books for Young Readers	Commended
2022	¡¡Manu!!	Kelly Fernández	Kelly Fernández	Graphix	Commended
2022	Neverforgotten	Alejandra Algorta, trans. by Aida Salazar	Iván Rickenmann	Levine Querido	Commended
2022	On the Hook	Francisco X. Stork		Scholastic Press	Commended
2022	The Life of – La Vida de Dolores	Patty Rodriguez and Ariana Stein	Citlali Reyes	Lil’ Libros Press	Commended
2022	The Mirror Season	Anna-Marie McLemore		Feiwel & Friends	Commended
2022	To Carnaval! A Celebration in Saint Lucia	Baptiste Paul	Jana Glatt	Barefoot Books	Commended
2022	When We Make It	Elisabet Velasquez		Dial Books	Commended
2022	Your Heart, My Sky: Love in a Time of Hunger	Margarita Engle		Atheneum Books for Young Readers	Commended
2022	Zonia's Rain Forest	Juana Martinez-Neal	Juana Martinez-Neal	Candlewick Press	Commended
2023	Growing an Artist: The Story of a Landscaper and His Son	John Parra		Simon & Schuster Books for Young Readers	Winner
2023	Isla to Island	Alexis Castellanos		Atheneum Books for Young Readers	Winner
2023	¡Ándale, Prieta!	Yasmín Ramírez		Lee & Low Books	Honor
2023	Miss Quinces	Kat Fajardo	Mariana Azzi	Graphix	Honor
2023	Self-Made Boys	Anna-Marie McLemore		Feiwel and Friends	Honor
2023	Abuela's Fideo: A Story of a Grandma's Love	Gabriela Tijerina	Gabriela Tijerina	Del Alma Publications	Commended
2023	Abuelita and Me	Leonarda Carranza	Rafael Mayani	Annick Press	Commended
2023	Amazona	Canizales	Canizales	Graphic Universe	Commended
2023	Chabelita's Heart / El corazón de Chabelita	Isabel Millán	Rafael Mayani	Reflection Press	Commended
2023	Frizzy	Claribel A. Ortega	Rose Bousamra	First Second	Commended
2023	Hispanic Star: Roberto Clemente	Claudia Romo Edelman and Sara E. Echenique	Manuel Gutierrez	Roaring Brook Press	Commended
2023	Invisible	Christina Diaz Gonzalez	Gabriela Epstein	Graphix	Commended
2023	Islands Apart: Becoming Dominican America	Jasminne Mendez		Piñata Books	Commended
2023	Lakelore	Anna-Marie McLemore		Feiwel & Friends	Commended
2023	Llort: The life of-la vida de Llort	Cynthia Gonzalez	Citlali Reyes	Lil' Libros	Commended
2023	My Neighborhood	María José Ferrada, trans. by Kit Maude	Ana Penyas	Tapioca Stories	Commended
2023	El niño de maíz/The Boy of Maize	Mario Bencastro	Christina Rodriguez	Piñata Books	Commended
2023	Rima's Rebellion: Courage in a Time of Tyranny	Margarita Engle		Atheneum Books for Young Readers	Commended
2023	The Secret of the Plátano	Luz Maria Mack	Stephany Mesa	Soaring Kite Books	Commended
2023	Still Dreaming/Seguimos soñando	Claudia Guadalupe Martinez, trans. by Luis Humberto Crosthwaite	Magdalena Mora	Children's Book Press	Commended
2023	Tumble	Celia C. Pérez		Kokila	Commended
2023	Where Wonder Grows	Xelena González	Adriana M. Garcia	Cinco Puntos Press	Commended

== Recipients of multiple awards and honors ==
=== Multiple Américas Awards ===
One person's works have received four Américas Awards:

- Margarita Engle, as author in 2006, 2009, 2012, and 2015.

One person's works have received three Américas Awards:

- Duncan Tonatiuh, as author and illustrator in 2015, 2018, and 2019.

Multiple people's works have won two Américas Awards:

- As author and illustrator: Yuyi Morales.
- As author: Julia Alvarez, Monica Brown, Juan Felipe Herrera, Francisco Jiménez, Lynn Joseph and Pam Muñoz Ryan.

=== Multiple Américas Honors ===
Multiple people's works have received two honors:

- As author and illustrator: Maya Christina González, Yuyi Morales, and Duncan Tonatiuh
- As illustrator David Díaz
- As author: Margarita Engle, Judith Ortiz Cofer, and Laura Resau

=== Multiple Américas Commendations ===
Different works by the same authors or illustrators have received commendations in the same year.

Two people's work has received commendations nine times:

- George Ancona as both author and illustrator in 1994, 1995, 1998, 1999, 2000, 2001, 2003, 2007–2008, and 2011.
- Maya Christina González as illustrator twice in 1997, and once 1998, 1999, 2001, 2002, 2007–2008, and 2009; and as author and illustrator in 2007–2008.

Three people's work has received commendations eight times:

- Jorge Argueta as author in 2003, twice in 2006, 2007–2008, 2010, 2011, 2016, and 2017.
- Margarita Engle as author in 2010, 2014, twice in 2016, 2017, twice in 2018, and 2019.
- Gary Soto as author in 1995, twice in 1997, twice in 1998, 2003, 2006, and 2009.

Two people's work has received commendations seven times:

- Alma Flor Ada as author in 1995, twice in 1997, 1998, 2002, and 2016.
- Pat Mora as author in 1996, 1997, 2002, twice in 2010, and 2011.

Two people's works have received commendations six times:

- David Díaz as illustrator in 1996, 2000, 2002, 2010, 2011, and 2016.
- Enrique O. Sánchez as illustrator in 1993, 1994, twice in 1996, 1997, and 1999.

Four people's works have received commendations five times:

- Francisco X. Alarcón as author in 1997, 1998, 1999, 2001, and 2009.
- Monica Brown as author in 2007–2008, 2010, 2014, 2016, and 2018.
- Raúl Colón as illustrator in 1997, 2005, 2007–2008, and twice in 2015.
- Francisco X. Stork as author in 2006, 2010, 2011, 2017, and 2018.

Eight people's works have received commendations four times:

- Lori Marie Carlson as author in 1994, 1996, 2005, and 2009.
- Lulu Delacre as illustrator in 1994 and 1997; as author in 1996; and author and illustrator in 2000.
- Domi as illustrator in 2006, 2006, 2009, and 2011.
- Arthur Dorros as author and illustrator in 1993 and 1995, and as author in 2005 and 2015.
- Tony Johnston as author in 1994, 1997, 2001, and 2010.
- Rafael López as illustrator in 2010, 2014, 2016, and 2018.
- Edel Rodríguez as illustrator in 2001, 2010, and twice in 2016.
- Benjamin Alire Sáenz as author in twice in 2009, 2013, and 2018.

Twenty people's works have received commendations three times:

- Rudolfo Anaya as author in 1995, 2000, and 2004.
- Carmen T. Bernier-Grand as author in 1994, 2007–2008, and 2010.
- Robert Casilla as illustrator in 1993, 1996, and 2004.
- Joe Cepeda as illustrator in 1998, 2007–2008, and 2011.
- René Colato Laínez as author in 2010, 2011, and 2017.
- Amy Córdova as illustrator in 2004, 2009, and 2011.
- Tomie dePaola as author and illustrator in 1994, and as illustrator in 1994 and 1999.
- Luis Garay as illustrator in 1996 and 2007–2008, and as author and illustrator in 1997.
- Phillis Gershator as author twice in 1994 and once in 1998.
- Juan Felipe Herrera as author in 1995, 2002, and 2015.
- Francisco Jiménez as author in 1998, 2000, and 2009.
- Elisa Kleven as illustrator in 1994 and 1997, and author and illustrator in 1996.
- Georgina Lázaro as author in 2009, 2010, and 2018.
- Frané Lessac as author and illustrator in 1994, and as illustrator in 1994 and 2013.
- Meg Medina as author in 2014, 2017, and 2019.
- Roseanne Greenfield Thong as author in 2014 and twice in 2015.
- Duncan Tonatiuh as author and illustrator in 2011 and 2017, and as illustrator in 2016.
- Beatriz Vidal as illustrator in 1998, 2002, and 2018.
- Jeanette Winter as illustrator in 1997, and as author and illustrator in 2007-2008 and 2011.
- Rafael Yockteng as illustrator in 2002, 2010, and 2016.

Multiple people's work has received two commendations:

- As author and illustrator: Angela Dominguez, Laura Lacámara, Yuyi Morales, and Leyla Torres.
- As illustrator: Jamel Akib, Renato Alarcão, Andrea Arroyo, Martha Avilés, Claire B. Cotts, Felipe Dávalos, Carla Golembe, Ann Grifalconi, Holly Meade, John Parra, Raúl the Third, Alfonso Ruano, Synthia Saint James, Elivia Savadier, Simón Silva.
- As author: Eve Bunting, Cathy Camper, Teresa Cárdenas, Pablo Cartaya, Omar S. Castañeda, Matt de la Peña, Campbell Geeslin, Mary-Joan Gerson, Lucía M. González, Rigoberta Menchú, Jose-Luis Orozco, Amada Irma Pérez, Isabel Quintero, Vashanti Rahaman, Antonio Ramírez, Laura Resau, Roni Capin Rivera-Ashford, Carmen Tafolla, Erika Tamar, Nancy Van Laan, and Jonah Winter.
