= Elisa Kleven =

American writer

Elisa Kleven is an American children's writer and illustrator of 30 books. She grew up in Los Angeles and currently resides near San Francisco. Her titles have been Booklist editor's choices, and PBS and Rainbow Book selections.

== Career ==
Kleven has written several children's books including the Paper Princess series, The Puddle Pail and The Lion and the Little Red Bird. Her first book was Ernst, a story about a creative crocodile named Ernst, whose tendency to wonder "what if" mirrors the author's own.

In addition to writing her own books, Kleven has also illustrated books by other writers, such as Abuela by Arthur Dorros, De Colores by Jose Luis Orozco, Angels Watching Over Me by Julia Durano, and The Weaver by Thacher Hurd.

Kleven is a member of the Society of Children's Book Writers and Illustrators. She has been recognized nationally with awards and honors from the American Library Association, The New York Times, the Junior Library Guild, School Library Journal and the American Institute of Graphic Arts.

== Response ==
Kirkus Reviews said of her children's book Welcome Home Mouse, "Every word and brush stroke is spot-on in this luminous celebration of creativity, conservation and compassion." Kirkus Reviews noted of A Monster in the House "a wondrously silly tale ... expect laughter". Time Out New York noted Welcome Home, Mouse's intricate illustrations. Publishers Weekly said of A Monster in the House, “ Kleven honestly portrays the mixed feelings of affection and annoyance that siblings often have for one another."

Booklist gave Kleven a starred review for her illustrations in Abuela saying, "Each illustration is a masterpiece of color, line, and form that will mesmerize youngsters. These are pages to be studied again and again...this book is a jewel." Publishers Weekly said of The Dancing Deer and the Foolish Hunter, “Kleven's signature kaleidoscopic blend of color and texture and her respect for nature theme never disappoint.”
