= Luis Humberto Crosthwaite =

Writer, editor, and journalist

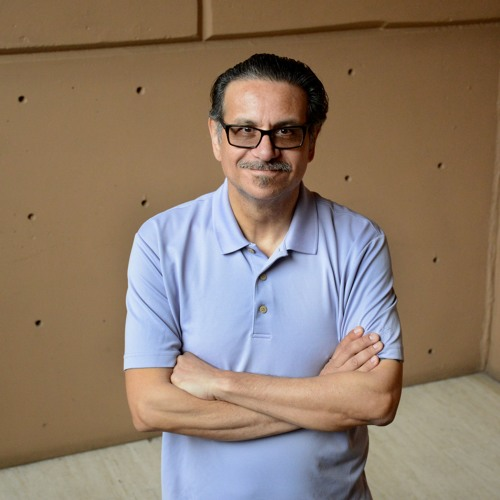
- Born: 1962 (age 62–63); Tijuana, Mexico
- Occupation: Writer, editor, and journalist

Luis Humberto Crosthwaite (born 1962 in Tijuana) is a writer, editor, and journalist whose work has appeared in a variety of international venues. His fiction works have garnered critical attention for his ability to express the complexities of living on the US/Mexico border region.

Crosthwaite spent most of his life in Tijuana before moving to San Diego, where he worked at The San Diego Union-Tribune newspaper as columnist and editor.

Currently, Crosthwaite lives in Tijuana.

== Publications ==
=== English ===
==== As author ====
- The Moon Will Forever be a Distant Love, translated by Debbie Nathan and Willivaldo Delgadillo, from La luna siempre será un dificíl amor (novel, 1997)
- Out of their Minds (2013)

==== As editor ====
- Puro Border: Dispatches, Snapshots, & Graffiti from La Frontera (anthology, 2003)

==== As translator ====
- Once Around the Block / Una Vuelta a la Manzana, written and illustrated by José Lozano (2009)
- Little Chanclas, written and illustrated by José Lozano (2015)
- Birdie's Beauty Parlor / El Salon de Belleza de Birdie, written by Lee Merrill Byrd and illustrated by Francisco Degado (2020)
- Maximilian and the Curse of the Fallen Angel, written and illustrated by Xavier Garza (2020)
- Still Dreaming/Seguimos soñando written by Claudia Guadalupe Martinez and illustrated by Magdalena Mora (2022)

=== Spanish ===
- Marcela y el rey al fin juntos (short stories, 1988)
- Mujeres con traje de baño caminan solitarias por las playas de su llanto (short stories, 1990)
- El gran preténder (novella, 1990)
- No quiero escribir no quiero (short stories, 1993)
- Lo que estará en mi corazón (non-fiction, 1994)
- La luna siempre será un amor difícil (novel, 1994)
- Estrella de la calle sexta (two novellas and a short story), 2000)
- Idos de la mente - la increíble y (a veces) triste historia de Ramón y Cornelio (novel, 2001)
- Instrucciones para cruzar la frontera (short stories, 2002)
- Aparta de mí este cáliz (novel, 2009)
- Idos de la mente - la increíble y (a veces) triste historia de Ramón y Cornelio (revised edition, 2010)
- Tijuana: crimen y olvido (novel, 2010)
- Instrucciones para cruzar la frontera (revised edition, 2011)
