= Robert Casilla =

American artist and illustrator

Robert Casilla (born April 16, 1959) is an American artist and illustrator of award-winning children's books. He has illustrated over 30 children's books, including biographies and multicultural stories. His illustrations are influenced by his Hispanic background.

== Biography ==
Mr. Casilla was born in Jersey City, New Jersey and received a BFA from the School of Visual Arts in New York City in 1982. Mr. Casilla has illustrated several books for children, including biographies of Martin Luther King Jr., John F. Kennedy, Jackie Robinson, and Eleanor Roosevelt. His parents are native from Puerto Rico and Mr. Casilla attended school in Puerto Rico in the fourth grade. He has illustrated various multicultural children books, including Belpré Medal winner First Day in Grapes. Casilla has been interested in drawing since he was a child. He currently resides in New Fairfield, Connecticut. He lives with his wife and two children. He has three cats and one dog.

== Careers ==
Robert Casilla has worked as a freelance illustrator for magazines, book publishers, and educational publishers. He has illustrated over 30 children's books. He currently teaches art to children and he visits schools to talk to students about the process of illustrating books and biographies. He studied under the artists Marshal Arisman, Jim McMullan, Baron Storey and Julian Allen.

== Works ==
- Martin Luther King, Jr.: Free at Last written by David A. Adler, Holiday House 1986.
- The Train to Lulu's written by Elizabeth Fitzgerald Howard, Bradbury Press 1988.
- Poems for Fathers written by Myra Cohn Livingston, Holiday House 1989.
- Jackie Robinson: He Was First written by David A. Adler, Holiday House 1989.
- A Picture Book of Martin Luther King Jr. written by David A. Adler, Holiday House 1989.
- A Picture Book of John F. Kennedy written by David A. Adler, Holiday House 1991.
- Con mi hermano/With my Brother written by Eileen Roe, Maxwell Macmillan International Pub. Group 1991.
- A Picture Book of Eleanor Roosevelt written by David A. Adler, Holiday House 1991.
- A Picture Book of Jesse Owens written by David A. Adler, Holiday House 1992.
- A Picture Book of Simon Bolivar written by David A. Adler, Holiday House 1992.
- A Picture Book of Rosa Parks written by David A. Adler, Holiday House 1993.
- The Little Painter of Sabana Grande written by Patricia Maloney Markun, Maxwell Macmillan International 1993.
- The Pool Party written by Gary Soto, Delacorte Press 1993.
- Rodeo Day written by JoNelle Toriseva, Simon & Schuster Children's Publishing 1994.
- A Picture Book of Jackie Robinson written by David A. Adler, Holiday House 1994.
- Jalapeño Bagels written by Natasha Wing, Atheneum Books for Young Readers 1996.
- A Picture Book of Thurgood Marshall written by David A. Adler, Holiday House 1997.
- The Legend of Mexicatl written by Jo Harper, Turtle Books 1998.
- In the Shadow of the Mountain written by Lisa Demauro, McGraw-Hill School Division 1999.
- My Sister's Surprise written by Barbara Dodson, Houghton Mifflin 20??.
- Daddy Poems by John Micklos, Wordsong 2000.
- Sam and Jack written by Donna Taylor, McGraw-Hill School Division 2001.
- Dan's Time written by Susan Blackaby, McGraw-Hill School Division 2001.
- This is Your Land written by Anne Lawrence, Macmillan/McGraw-Hill 2002.
- A Voice for her People written by Flora Foss, Macmillan/McGraw-Hill 2002.
- The Drum Beats On written by Janelle Cherrington, Scholastic 2002.
- First Day in Grapes written by L. King Perez, Lee & Low Books 2002.
- Mama had to Work on Christmas written by Carolyn Marsden, Viking 2003.
- Cheyenne Horses written by Kay Livorse, Harcourt 2003.
- Basement Basketball written by Kay Livorse, Harcourt 2003.
- Midnight Forests written by Gary Hines, Boyds Mills Press 2005
- Larry Bird: The Boy from French Lick written by Francine Poppo Rich, Blue Marlin Publications 2009.
- The Lunch Thief written by Anne C. Bromeley, Tilbury House Publishers 2010.
- Dolores Huertas: A Hero to Migrant Workers written by Sarah Warren, Two Lions 2012.
- Let's Salsa/Bailemos salsa written by Lupe Ruiz-Flores, Pinata Books 2013.

== Exhibitions ==
Robert Casilla has been featured in the following exhibitions:

- Connecticut Watercolor Society Group Show November 2010
- Connecticut Watercolor Society Group Show June 2010
- Connecticut Watercolor Society Group Show December 2009: Honorable Mention- El Yunque Rain Forest Three Years After Hurricane.
- Connecticut Watercolor Society Group Show May 2009
- Society of Illustrators Annual Group Show 51- March 2009
- Society of Illustrators Traveling Exhibition- 1994
- Society of Illustrators Annual Group Show 36- February 1994
- The Art of the Baseball Card Group Exhibition 1991
- Pelham Art Center Children's Book Show 1989
- Society of Illustrators Annual Group Show 28- April 1986

== Awards ==
- 1993 Américas Award – Commended, Little Painter of Sabana Grande
- 1996 Washington Irving Award, Little Painter of Sabana Grande
- 1996 Américas Award – Commended, Jalapeño Bagels
- 2004 Pura Belpré Illustrator Award Honor, First Day in Grapes by L. King Pérez
- 2004 Américas Award – Commended, Dream on Blanca's Walls
- 2006 American Literacy Corporation Illustrator Choice Award
- 2011 Skipping Stone Honor Award, The Lunch Thief by Anne C. Bromley
- 2013 Jane Addams Children's Book Honors Award, Dolores Huerta: A Hero to Migrant Workers
- 2013 Amelia Bloomer Project, Dolores Huerta: A Hero to Migrant Workers
