= Patricia Marcantonio =

American novelist and short story writer

- Born: Patricia Santos; Pueblo, Colorado, U.S.
- Education: B.S., Mass Communications, Colorado State University Pueblo
- Occupations: Novelist, short story writer
- Website: patriciamarcantonio.com

Patricia Marcantonio is an American novelist and short story writer. She is the author of the Felicity Carrol mystery series and an award-winning collection of short stories, Red Ridin' in the Hood and Other Cuentos.

== Background ==
She was born in Pueblo, Colorado, the granddaughter of Mexican immigrants. She earned a B.S. degree in mass communications from Colorado State University Pueblo and formerly worked as a crime and trial reporter. She now lives in Idaho.

== Books ==
- What Makes a Good Scary Story and How to Start Writing One (2026)
- Trini's Magic Kitchen (Arte Público Press) 2025
- Misbehaving at Cactus Lanes (One More Chapter)
- Best Amigas (Fitzroy Books)
- Under the Blood Moon (Dark Ink)
- Felicity Carrol and the Murderous Menace (Crooked Lane Books, 2020)
- Felicity Carrol and the Perilous Pursuit (Crooked Lane Books, 2019)
- Verdict in the Desert (Arte Público, 2016)
- Billie Neville Takes a Leap (River St. Press, 2014)
- Sueno Street (2017) Illustrated by Mike Youngman
- The Weeping Woman (Mesa Books, 2021)
- The Ghost Sisters and the Girl in Hallway B (Mesa Books, 2016)
- Hauntings from the Snake River Plain (Anthology; River St. Press, 2012)
- Voices from the Snake River Plain (Anthology; River St. Press, 2009)
- Red Ridin' in the Hood and Other Cuentos (Farrar, Straus and Giroux, 2005)
- On Holy Ground: The History, Art and Faith of St. Edward the Confessor Roman Catholic Church, Twin Falls, Idaho ( 2003)

== Plays ==
- Don't Leave my Body on Everest co-written with Amanda Turner
- Roja Ridin' in the Hood and Other Tales (Pioneer Drama Service)
- Starring Jane Eyre
- Tears for Llorona

== Awards and honors ==
Her book, BEST AMIGAS has been named a 2024 Américas Award Commended Title for Young Adult Fiction. The Américas Award for Children's and Young Adult Literature is a literary award presented annually that recognizes high quality "children's and young adult books that portray Latin America, the Caribbean, or Latinos in the United States, and to provide teachers with recommendations for classroom use.” It is part of the Consortium of Latin American Studies Programs. BEST AMIGAS is published by Fitzroy Books.

Her Victorian mystery novel, Felicity Carrol and the Perilous Pursuit, is the first of a series and has received favorable reviews from the Historical Novel Society, Publishers Weekly, Kirkus Reviews, and the New York Journal of Books.

Her courtroom drama, Verdict in the Desert, was included in Amazon's Latino Best Seller List and the 2016 Latina Book Club Books of the Year, and was favorably reviewed by Kirkus Reviews. Also in 2016, she was featured as Author of the Month on Houston Public Media.

Her short story collection, Red Ridin' in the Hood and Other Cuentos, received the Anne Izard Storytellers' Choice Award, an Américas Award for Children's and Young Adult Literature (Commended Title), and recommendations from Publishers Weekly, the National Council of Teachers of English, and the Bulletin of the Center for Children's Books. It was included in "50 Multicultural Books Every Child Should Know" by the Cooperative Children's Book Center (CCBC) at the University of Wisconsin–Madison School of Education and in "Exceptional Anthologies and Short Story Collections" by the All the Wonders podcast.

She has won several screenplay and short story contests. She also received Alexa Rose Foundation grants to direct her original play "Tears for Llorona" and to workshop her play, "Starring Jane Eyre." She produced and directed her play "Roja Ridin' in the Hood and Other Tales" at the Nampa Public Library as part of its Hispanic Heritage Celebration. The play was funded partly by a grant through the Idaho Commission on the Arts.
