= Jorge Argueta =

Salavadoran poet

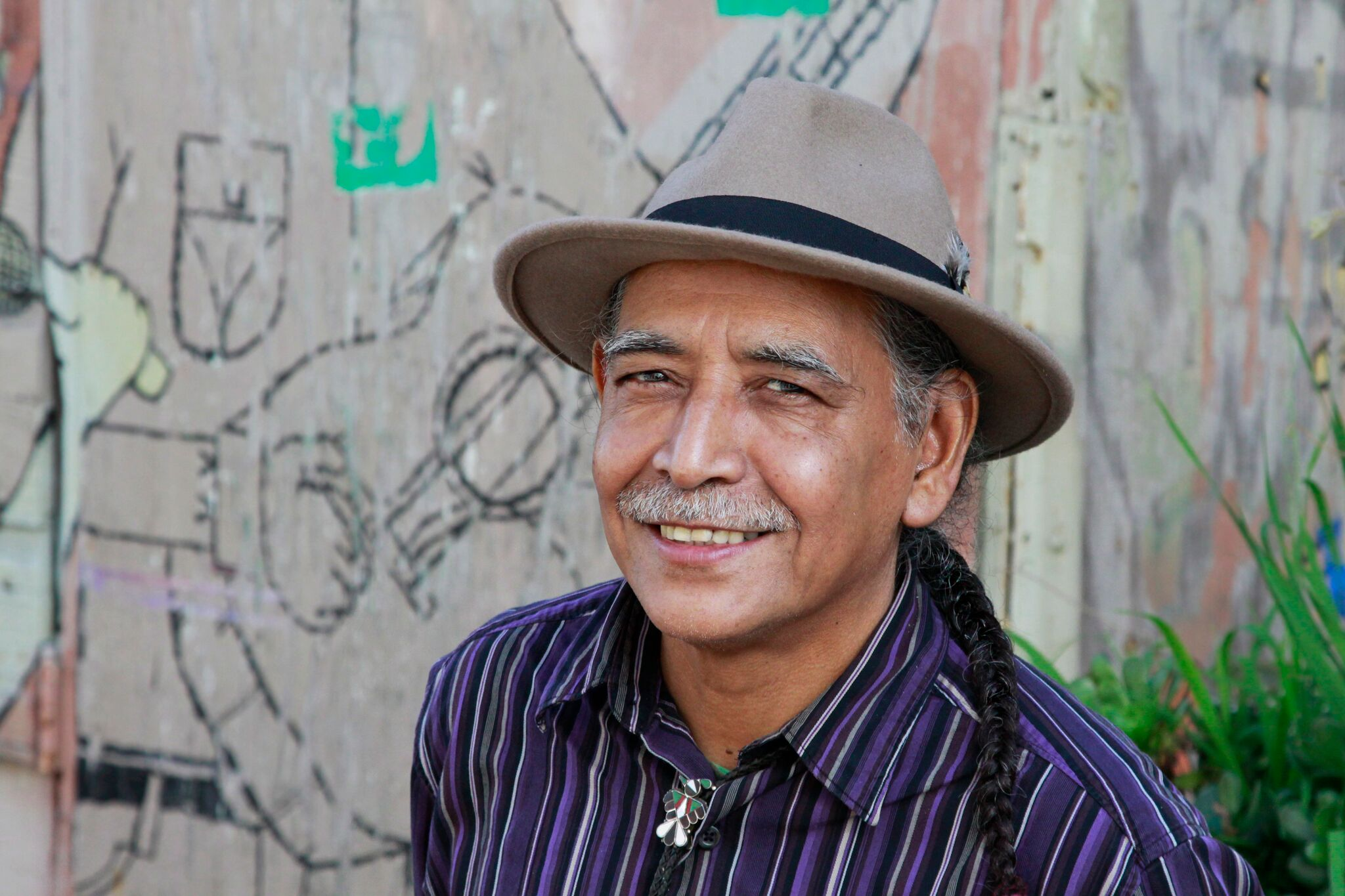
Jorge Tetl Argueta

Jorge Argueta (born in El Salvador and a Pipil Nahua) is a Salvadoran award-winning poet and author of many highly acclaimed bilingual children's books and short stories, covering themes related to Latino culture and traditions, nature, and the immigrant experience. He immigrated to the United States in the 1980s during the Salvadoran Civil War.

== Early life ==
Argueta grew up in Santo Domingo de Guzmán El Salvador, where his grandmother, an indigenous healer, told him stories from his indigenous heritage and their belief in a human-nature connection, instilling in him great respect for the environment and appreciation for oral tradition. He spent time in the city helping his parents run a small restaurant as well as in the countryside, helping his grandparents tend to their farm. He left El Salvador when he was 19 years old due to the ongoing Salvadoran Civil War.

== Career ==
Argueta has worked as a gardener and in a coffeehouse. He has written numerous children's books, short stories as well as poems that have been included in textbooks and anthologies. His children's books are written in poetry form, in two languages (English and Spanish), and reflect the Latino experience and heritage; he also writes about the Nahuat Pipil and their deep appreciation and respect for nature. His adult poems cover themes of the hardships of growing up in El Salvador during wartime and the difficulties experienced by immigrants in the United States. He has spent over 15 years as a workshop and classroom presenter, speaking about the power of poetry on children's lives.

== Awards ==
- 2001 Américas Award for Children & Young Adult Literature – Commendation, A Movie In My Pillow
- 2002 Independent Publisher Book Awards Multicultural Fiction Juvenile/Young Adult – Winner, A Movie In My Pillow
- 2002 Skipping Stones Honor Award for Multicultural Literature, A Movie In My Pillow
- 2003 Américas Award for Children & Young Adult Literature – Commendation, Xochitl and the Flowers/Xochitl, la niña de las flores
- 2004 Independent Publisher Book Award Multicultural Fiction Juvenile/Young Adult – Finalist, Xochitl and the Flowers/Xochitl, la niña de las flores
- 2005 NAPPA Gold Award – Preschool/Kindergarten, Moony Luna/Luna, Lunita, Lunera
- 2006 Américas Award for Children & Young Adult Literature – Commendation, Talking With Mother Earth
- 2006 Américas Award for Children & Young Adult Literature – Commendation, La fiesta de las tortillas / La Fiesta de Las Tortillas
- 2007-2008 Américas Award for Children & Young Adult Literature - Commendation, Alfredito Flies Home
- 2010 Américas Award for Children & Young Adult Literature – Commendation, Sopa de frijoles / Bean Soup
- 2011 Northern California Book Award – Finalist, Arroz con leche: Un poema para cocinar/Rice Pudding: A Cooking Poem
- 2016 Américas Award for Children & Young Adult Literature – Commendation, Salsa: Un poema para cocinar / A Cooking Poem
- 2017 Lee Bennett Hopkins Poetry Award Somos como las nubes / We Are Like the Clouds

== Bibliography ==
=== Books for Children ===
A Movie in My Pillow/Una película en mi almohada (bilingual), illustrated by Elizabeth Gómez, Children's Book Press (San Francisco, CA), 2001.

El Zipitio, illustrated by Gloria Calderón, translated by Elisa Amado, Groundwood Books (Toronto, Ontario, Canada), 2003.

Trees Are Hanging from the Sky/Los árboles estan colgando del cielo, illustrated by Rafael Yockteng, translated by Elisa Amado, Groundwood Books (Toronto, Ontario, Canada), 2003.

Xochitl and the Flowers/Xóchitl, la niña de las flores (bilingual), illustrated by Carl Angel, Children's Book Press (San Francisco, CA), 2003.

Moony Luna/Luna, Lunita Lunera (bilingual), illustrated by Elizabeth Gómez, Children's Book Press (San Francisco, CA), 2005.

The Fiesta of the Tortillas/La fiesta de las tortillas (bilingual), illustrated by María Jesus Alvarez, Alfaguara (Miami, FL), 2006.

The Little Hen in the City/La gallinita en la ciudad (bilingual), illustrated by Mima Castro, Alfaguara (Miami, FL), 2006.

Talking With Mother Earth: Poems/Hablando con Madre Tierra: poemas (bilingual), illustrated by Lucia Angela Pérez, Groundwood Books (Toronto, Ontario, Canada), 2006.

Alfredito Flies Home/Alfredito regresa volando a su casa, illustrated by Luis Garay, Groundwood Books (Toronto, Ontario, Canada), 2007.

The best match: A Mayan Folktale illustrated by Peter Martínez Grosshauser, Hampton-Brown (Carmel, CA), 2007.

Sopa de frijoles: Un poema para cocinar/Bean Soup: A Cooking Poem, illustrated by Rafael Yockteng, Groundwood Books/Libros Tigrillo (Toronto, Ontario, Canada), 2009.

Arroz con leche: Un poema para cocinar/Rice Pudding: A Cooking Poem, illustrated by Fernando Vilela, Groundwood Books (Toronto, Ontario, Canada), 2010.

Guacamole: Un poema para cocinar /A Cooking Poem illustrated by Margarita Sada, Groundwood Books (Toronto, Ontario, Canada), 2012.

Tamalitos: Un poema para cocinar/A Cooking Poem illustrated by Domi, Groundwood Books (Toronto, Ontario, Canada), 2013.

Salsa: Un poema para cocinar / A Cooking Poem illustrated by Duncan Tonatiuh, translated by Elisa Amado, Groundwood Books (Toronto, Ontario, Canada), 2015.

Somos como las nubes / We Are Like the Clouds illustrated by Alfonso Ruano, Groundwood Books(Toronto, Ontario, Canada), 2016.

Agua aguita / Water Little Water illustrated by Felipe Ugalde Alcántara, Arte Público Press (Houston, TX), 2017.

=== Poetry for Adults ===
Love Street, translated by Margot Pepper, Tiki Bob Publishing (San Francisco, CA), 1991.

Corazón del barrio/Heart of the neighborhood: poems, Manic D Press (San Francisco, CA), 1994.

En carne propia / Flesh Wounds, Arte Público Press (Houston, TX), 2017.
