= So Loud a Silence =

1996 young adult novel by Lyll Becerra de Jenkins

- First edition
- Author: Lyll Becerra de Jenkins
- Language: English
- Genre: Young adult novel
- Published: 1996 (Lodestar books)
- Publication place: USA
- Media type: Print (paperback)
- Pages: 154
- ISBN: 9780525675389
- OCLC: 34850308

So Loud a Silence is a 1996 young adult novel by Lyll Becerra de Jenkins. It is about a teenager, Juan Guillermo, who leaves Bogotá to live with his grandmother on a farm in the Colombian countryside.

== Reception ==
Kirkus Reviews wrote "A moiled, disappointingly passionless view of a people burdened by grief and fear after years of unchecked violence." while Publishers Weekly described it as "An intimate coming-of-age story, against a backdrop of terrorism and loss."

So Loud a Silence has also been reviewed by ALAN Review, Booklist, School Library Journal. The Horn Book Magazine Book Report, and Multicultural Review.

It is a 1996 CCBC Choices book, and a 1996 Américas Award for Children & Young Adult Literature honor book.

== See also ==
- The Honorable Prison
