= René Colato Laínez =

Salvadoran-American writer and educator

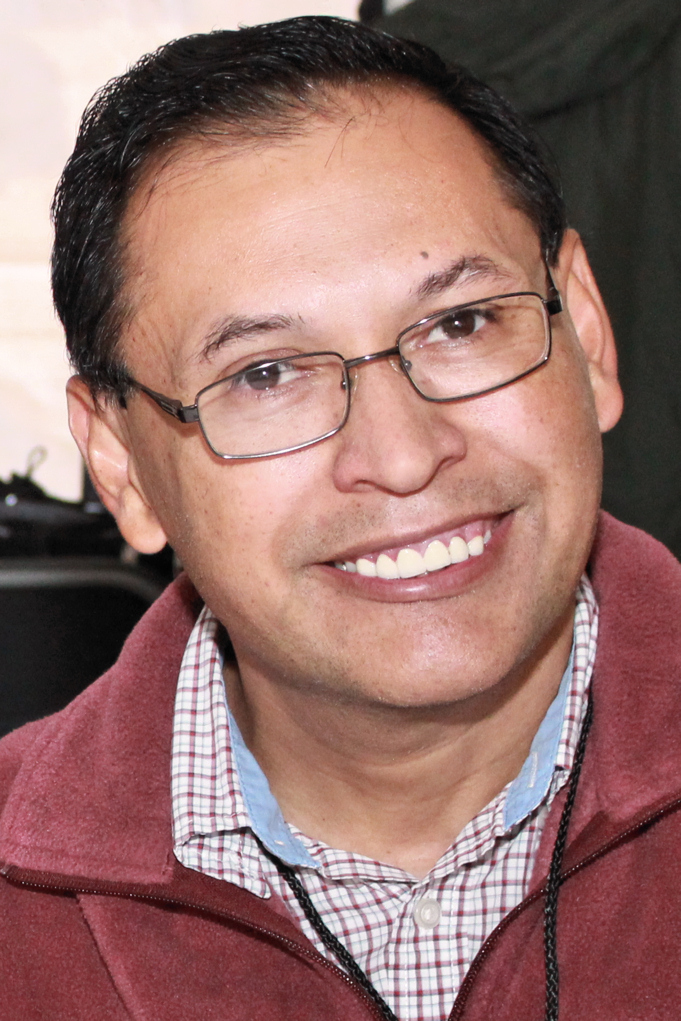
Colato Laínez at the 2016 Texas Book Festival

René Colato Laínez (born May 23, 1970, in San Salvador, El Salvador) is a Hispanic educator and author of several bilingual/multicultural award-winning children's books. His books reflect the Hispanic immigrant experience from a child’s point of view, covering topics such as cultural identity issues, the difficulties of learning a second language, and missing a loved one. Most of his books are based on his own experiences.

== Early life ==
As a child, Colato Laínez was inspired to write by his maternal granduncle, Jorge Buenaventura Lainez, a famous writer in El Salvador. Colato Laínez left his country at the age of 14 during the Salvadoran Civil War, settling in Los Angeles, California, where he entered high school and became an active contributor to the school's Spanish-language newspaper.

== Career ==
In 1993, Colato Laínez received a B.A. and teaching credentials from California State University, Northridge, and became an elementary school teacher in Sun Valley, California. While in college, he wrote short stories. In 2005, he earned an M.F.A. from the Vermont College of Fine Arts. He started submitting his stories to publishers in 2001. His first book, Waiting for Papá/Esperando a papá, was published in 2004. Along with his literary career, Colato Lainez continues to teach elementary school in Los Angeles.

== Themes ==
Colato Laínez examines themes of immigration, family, names, and language in his works.

Waiting for Papá/Esperando a papá, which follows a child whose father cannot come to the United States because of immigration issues, honors similar situations that many of his students had experienced, and he says that when he does public readings of the book, "there is always more than one person crying." Teachers have used this book to teach primary school students about immigration issues and connect with students who are experiencing hardships like those of the book's protagonist.

Immigration status also plays a role in Mamá the alien/Mamá la extraterrestre. In this book, a Latina girl suspects that her mother is an extraterrestrial, because of the dual meaning of the word alien.

Family, tradition, and language are central to Playing Lotería, which describes the relationship of a boy and his grandmother, who teach each other English and Spanish. Teachers have incorporated Playing Lotería into curricula to introduce a culturally-specific fund of knowledge. Family is also foregrounded in From North to South/Del norte al sur, as a boy travels with his father to visit his deported mother. Ghiso and Campano write that the book expresses a "message about the human dignity of families and their rights to be together."

Names are at the center of I Am René, the Boy/Soy René, el niño and René Has Two Last Names/René tiene dos apellidos. In René the Boy, the eponymous protagonist adjusts to having a classmate named Renee and learns more about his own name.

The Greenwood Encyclopedia of Latino Literature considers his works representative of an emergent Central American children's literature.

== Bibliography ==
- Waiting for Papá/Esperando a papá, illustrated by Anthony Accardo, Arte Público Press (Houston, TX) 2004
- I Am René, the Boy/Soy René, el niño, illustrated by Fabiola Graullera Ramírez, Arte Público (Houston, TX) 2005
- Playing Lotería/El juego de la lotería, illustrated by Jill Arena, Luna Rising (Flagstaff, AZ) 2005
- René Has Two Last Names/René tiene dos apellidos, illustrated by Fabiola Graullera Ramírez, Piñata Books (Houston, TX) 2009
- From North to South/Del norte al sur, illustrated by Joe Cepeda, Children's Book Press (San Francisco, CA) 2010
- The Tooth Fairy Meets El Ratón Pérez, illustrated by Tom Lintern, Tricycle Press (Berkeley, CA) 2010
- My Shoes and I, illustrated by Fabricio Vanden Broeck, Boyds Mills Press (Honesdale, PA) 2010
- Señor Pancho Had a Rancho, illustrated by Elwood Smith, Holiday House (New York, NY) 2013
- ¡Juguemos al Fútbol y al Football!, illustrated by Lancman Ink, Alfaguara (Doral, FL) 2013
- Vamonos/Let’s go!, illustrated by Joe Cepeda, Holiday House, (New York, NY) 2015
- Mamá the alien/Mamá la extraterrestre, illustrated by Laura Lacámara, Children's Book Press (San Francisco, CA) 2016
- Telegrams to Heaven The Childhood of Archbishop Óscar Arnulfo Romero/Telegramas al cielo La infancia de Monseñor Óscar Arnulfo Romero, illustrated by Pixote Hunt, Luna's Press Books (San Francisco, CA) 2018
- Do I Belong Here? ¿Es este mi lugar?, illustrated by Fabricio Vanden Broeck (Houston, TX) 2023; winner of the Bronze Medal for Most Inspirational Bilingual Children's Picture Book at the 2025 International Latino Book Awards
