= Joe Hayes (author and storyteller) =

American storyteller

Joseph (Joe) Hayes
- Born: 12 November 1945 (age 80); Pennsylvania
- Occupations: Author, Storyteller, Editor, Translator
- Writing career
- Period: 1980s–present
- Genres: children's books, storytelling, New Mexican Spanish tales

Joseph (Joe) Hayes (born November 12, 1945) is an American author and teller of stories mainly found in the folklore of the American Southwest. Hayes was an early pioneer of bilingual Spanish/English storytelling. Joe currently lives in Santa Fe, New Mexico.

== Early life ==
Born in rural Western Pennsylvania not far from Pittsburgh, Joe was the youngest of five children, with two brothers and two sisters. His father often told stories to the children. Later, Joe would do the same for his children. The family later moved west to Benson, a small town in Arizona. Spending his late childhood and adolescent years in Southern Arizona, Joe picked up the Spanish that would become an integral part of his storytelling and writing.

== Education and Employment ==
In 1968, Joe graduated from the University of Arizona with a bachelor's degree in English. He started teaching at Sunnyside High School in Tucson, Arizona. Joe left teaching and was employed in mineral exploration work from 1972 to 1976, working all over the western U.S. as well as in Mexico and Spain. He moved to Los Alamos, New Mexico, in 1976 and again taught English. His interest in storytelling deepened, partly due to the early influence of his father, and he started to share the tales with a broader audience. In 1979, he began to devote himself full-time to sharing stories. He focuses on elementary school audiences, although his work appeals to a wide range of ages. In 1989, he was designated a New Mexico Eminent Scholar by the New Mexico Commission on Higher Learning. He is a guest lecturer at colleges and universities and delivered the commencement address at the Graduate School of Library and Information Science at the University of California, Los Angeles. In 2001, he traveled to Cuba participate in a translation workshop sponsored by Writers of the Americas and developed his interest in Cuban and African folk tales there. For children and adults alike, Hayes' storytelling sessions outside the tepee at the Wheelwright Museum in Santa Fe were a summer tradition that has continued for over 40 years.

== Works ==
=== Books ===
- A Heart Full of Turquoise, Mariposa Publishing, 1988
- Antonio's Lucky Day, Scholastic, 1993
- Coyote and the butterflies : a Pueblo Indian tale, Scholastic, 1993
- The Checker Playing Hound Dog, Mariposa Publishing, 1986
- Coyote &, Mariposa Publishing, 1983
- The Day It Snowed Tortillas : tales from Spanish New Mexico, Mariposa Pub., 1985, c1982
- Dance, Nana, dance = Baila, Nana, baila : Cuban folktales in English and Spanish Cinco Puntos Press, 2008
- El Cucuy A Bogeyman Cuento, Cinco Puntos Press, 2001 Winner: New Mexico Land of Enchantment Award
- Everyone Knows Gato Pinto, Mariposa Publishing, 1992
- Ghost Fever/Mal de fantasma, Cinco Puntos Press, 2004 Winner: Texas Bluebonnet Award
- The Gum Chewing Rattler Cinco Puntos Press, 2006
- Juan Verdades The Man Who Couldn't Tell a Lie Orchard Scholastic Books, 2001 Nominated: New Mexico Land of Enchantment Award Nominated: Texas Bluebonnet Award
- La Llorona/The Weeping Woman (Cinco Puntos, 1987)(Hard cover edition, Cinco Puntos Press, 2004)
- Little Gold Star/Estrellita de oro Cinco Puntos Press, 2000
- Mariposa, Mariposa, Trails West, 1988
- Monday, Tuesday, Wednesday, Oh!/Lunes, Martes, Miécoles, (O!, Trails West, 1897
- No Way, José!/(De Ninguna Manera, José, Trails West, 1986
- Pájaro Verde/The Green Bird Cinco Puntos Press, 2002 Winner: American Folklore Society Aesop Award
- Soft Child, Harbinger House, 1993
- A Spoon for Every Bite, Orchard Books, 1994
- Tell Me a Cuento/Cuéntame un story, Cinco Puntos Press, 1998
- The Terrible Tragadabas/El Terrible Tragadabas, Trails West, 1987
- Watch Out for Clever Women/Cuidado con las mujeres astutas, Cinco Puntos Press, 1994
- The Wise Little Burro, Trails West, 1990
- Where There's a Will, There's a Way/Donde hay ganas hay mañas, Trails West, 1995

=== Anthologies with Stories from Joe Hayes ===
- Best-Loved Stories Told at the National Storytelling Festival NAPPS, 1990
- More Best-Loved Stories Told at the National Storytelling Festival NAPPS, 1992
- Five-minute tales : more stories to read and tell when time is short by Margaret Read MacDonald; August House Publishers, 2007

=== Editing or Translations by Joe Hayes ===
- Celebrate Martin Luther King, Jr. Day with Mrs. Park's class Alfaguara/Santillana USA Pub. Co., 2006
- Celebrate a powwow with Sandy Starbright / F. Isabel Campoy & Alma Flor Ada; illustrated by Maria Jesus Alvarez; translated by Joe Hayes and Sharon Franco; Miami : Alfaguara/ Santillana USA, c2007.
- Celebrate Cinco de Mayo with the Mexican hat dance Alfaguara/ Santillana US, 2006.
- Cuentos de cuanto hay-Tales from Spanish New Mexico/collected from the oral tradition, by J. Manuel Espinosa;University of New Mexico Press, 1998.
- Celebrate Kwanzaa with Boots and her kittens Alfaguara/ Santillana USA
- Modelo antiguo : a novel of Mexico City; Cinco Pintos Press, 1997

== Quotes ==
I feel like my bilingual approach to storytelling has helped Spanish-speaking children feel proud of their heritage and at the same time has helped non-Hispanic children open up to and appreciate the Spanish language and Hispanic culture," wrote Hayes, a native of Pennsylvania and current New Mexico resident, in an email. "I think it's really important that my own heritage is not Hispanic. It defuses the 'us and them' way of looking at language. For Hispanic kids I'm one of 'them' honoring 'our' language, and for non-Hispanic kids it's one of 'us' honoring 'their' language. Barriers are lowered; rigid attitudes are softened; a better sense of community is fostered."

Someone has said that enemies are just people whose stories we don't know. I see a lot of truth in that. The more other people's stories are hidden from us, the easier it is for us to view them as enemies. But, when we begin to learn their stories, we recognize all we share in common with them and we delight in how the unique beauty of their traditions enriches our own lives.

== Awards and Accolades ==
- 1989 New Mexico Eminent Scholar by the New Mexico Commission on Higher Learning
- 1995 New Mexico Governor's Award for Excellence and Achievement in the Arts
- 1995 Southwest Book Award Border Regional Library Association – Watch Out for Clever Women/Cuidado con las mujeres astutas
- 1995 Children's Author Award, Arizona Library Assoc. the Soft Child: How the Rattlesnake Got Its Fangs
- 1996 Arizona Young Readers Award – Picture Book: Soft Child: How the Rattlesnake Got Its Fangs by Joe Hayes
- 2001 Land of Enchantment Children's Book Award – A Spoon for Every Bite
- 2002 IPPY Awards – Children's Picture Book (7 & over) Winner: !El Cucuy! by Joe Hayes; illus. Honorio Robledo (Cinco Puntos Press)
- 2003 IPPY Award Multicultural Fiction – Juv/Young Adult Winner: Pájaro Verde (The Green Bird) by Joe Hayes; illus by Antonio Castro L. (Cinco Puntos Press)
- 2003 Aesop Accolade Award – Pajaro Verde: The Green Bird. By Joe Hayes, illustrated by Antonio Castro L. El Paso, TX: Cinco Puntos, 2002.
- 2005 Talking Leaves Literary Oracle Award – National Storytelling Network
- 2005 Land of Enchantment Children's Book Award – El Cucuy
- 2005 Latino Book Awards: Best Children's Picture Book – Bilingual (Tie) La Llorona; Author: Joe Hayes Illustrator: Vicki Trego Hill & Mona Pennypacker Publisher: Cinco Puntos Press
- 2005 IPPY Award Story Teller of the Year Joe Hayes, author of Ghost Fever (Mal de Fantasma)and La Llorona (The Weeping Woman) (Cinco Puntos Press)
- 2007 Texas Bluebonnet Award – Ghost Fever (First Bilingual book to win the prize)
- 2009 Anne Izard Storytellers' Choice Awards – Dance, Nana, Dance/Baila, Nana, Baila: Cuban Folktales in English and Spanish (Cinco Puntos Press)
