= Sergio Andricaín =

Cuban writer and publisher of Spanish-language children's books

- Born: 1956 (age 69–70); Havana, Cuba
- Occupations: Journalist, author of children's books, publisher
- Writing career
- Genre: Children's literature

Sergio Andricaín is a Cuban journalist, literary scholar, publisher, and author of children's books.

== Biography ==
Sergio Andricaín was born in Havana, Cuba, in 1956. He is a journalist, literary scholar, publisher, and writer. He studied sociology at the University of Havana and in Costa Rica. He was a researcher at the Juan Marinello Cultural Center in Cuba and served in 1991 as a consultant for the National Reading Program in Costa Rica.

During the 1990s, he was an editor of the UNESCO publications Colección biblioteca del promotor de lectura (1993) and Niños y niñas del maíz (1995), and of the children's magazine for Colombia's Fundación Nacional Batuta for Youth and Children Symphonic Orchestras. As a writer, he has worked for several newspapers and magazines in Cuba, Costa Rica, Colombia, Spain, and the United States.

With Antonio Orlando Rodríguez, he created Fundación Cuatrogatos, a nonprofit that promotes Spanish-language reading, cultural, and educational projects in Miami, Florida, where he currently resides.

== Works or publications ==
- Andricaín, Sergio; Londoño, Ana María; Orlando Rodríguez, Antonio (2002), Adivínalo si puedes, Bogotá: Panamericana Editorial, ISBN 9583008796, OCLC 51823688
- Cuéllar, Olga; Andricaín, Sergio (2008), Arco iris de poesía : poemas de las Américas y España, New York, N.Y.: Lectorum Publications, ISBN 1930332599, OCLC 145941724
- Andricaín, Sergio (2000), Cuentos de hadas de ayer y siempre, Bogotá: Editorial Magisterio, OCLC 67831796
- Vallejo, Esperanza; Andricaín, Sergio (2000), Cuentos de hadas de hoy y mañana, Santa Fé de Bogotá, D.C., Colombia: Magisterio, OCLC 76861607
- Da Coll, Ivar; Andricaín, Sergio; Rodríguez, Antonio Orlando (1999), El libro de Antón Pirulero, Santafé de Bogotá, D.C. Colombia: Panamericana Editorial, ISBN 958300474X, OCLC 46347654
- Andricaín, Sergio; Mello, Helena; Rodríguez, Antonio Orlando (2012), El pequeño gran pescador : y otras historias, Bogotá: Panamericana, OCLC 822895255
- Andricaín, Sergio; Rodríguez, Antonio Orlando (2003), Escuela y poesía : y qué hago con el poema?, Buenos Aires: Lugar Editorial, ISBN 950892148X, OCLC 53826512
- Andricaín, Sergio; Vallejo, Esperanza (2005), Hace muchísimo tiempo : cuentos, mitos y leyendas de América Latina, Bogotá D.C., Colombia: Panamericana Editorial, OCLC 435535579
- Londoño, Ana María; Andricaín, Sergio (2009), Hola! que me lleva la ola : rimas, juegos y versos, Bogotá: Alfaguara, ISBN 9587045270, OCLC 225875280
- Andricaín, Sergio (1999), Isla de versos : poesía cubana para niños, Santa Fe de Bogotá, D.C., Colombia, S.A.: Cooperativa Editorial Magisterio, OCLC 46839210
- Andricaín, Sergio; Vallejo, Esperanza (2003), La caja de las coplas, Bogotá: Panamericana Editorial, OCLC 57444335, ISBN 958301155X
- La Joven De Los Cabellos De Oro Y Otras Historias / The Girl with the Golden Hair and Other Stories., Panamericana Pub Llc, 2013, OCLC 822895256
- Lima, Chely; Andricaín, Sergio; Acelas, Catalina (2010), La planeta de los papá-bebés, Bogotá, Colombia: Panamericana Editorial, OCLC 676690101
- Andricaín, Sergio; Rodríguez, Antonio Orlando (2012), Lalla la hermosa : y otras historias, Bogotá: Panamericana, OCLC 822895257
- Andricaín, Sergio; Editorial Everest; Feijoó, Núria (2002), Lero, lero, candelero : rimas, canciones y adivinanzas para niños, León, España: Everest, OCLC 781861535
- Andricaín, Sergio; Londoño, Ana María (2008), Libro secreto de los duendes, Bogotá: Panamericana Editorial, OCLC 234428708
- Andricaín, Sergio; Marín de Sásá, Flora; Rodríguez, Antonio Orlando (1995), Puertas a la lectura, Santafé de Bogotá, Colombia: Cooperativa Editorial Magisterio, OCLC 227188292
- Andricaín, Sergio; Lago, Alexis; Rodríguez, Antonio Orlando (2012), Rustam el valiente : y otras historias, Bogotá: Panamericana, OCLC 822895259
- Andricaín, Sergio; Cuéllar, Olga (2005), Un zoológico en casa, Bogotá: Panamericana Editorial, ISBN 9583017388, OCLC 123119649
- Andricaín, Sergio; Vallejo, Esperanza; Rodríguez, Antonio Orlando (2012), ¡Piratas a la vista : y otras historias, Bogotá: Panamericana, OCLC 822895258
