= Amada Irma Perez =

American novelist

- Born: 1951 (age 74–75); Mexicali, Mexico
- Education: California Polytechnic State University, San Luis Obispo (BA); California Lutheran University
- Occupations: Writer, teacher
- Writing career
- Notable works: My Very Own Room/Mi propio cuartito My Diary From Here to There/Mi diario de aqui hasta alla Nana's Big Surprise: Nana, Que Sorpresa!
- Notable awards: Pura Belpré Award (2004); Tomás Rivera Children’s Book Award (2000); Americas Award for Children’s Literature; Parents’ Guide to Children’s Media Award; Independent Publishers Book Award; Skipping Stones Honor Book Award
- Website: www.amadairmaperez.com

Amada Irma Perez (born 1951) is a Mexican American writer and advocate for programs encouraging multicultural understanding. She has written four children's books and is a recipient of the 2004 Pura Belpré Award for illustration.

== Early life and education ==
Perez was born in 1951, in Mexicali Mexico, as the oldest of 6 children. When she was five years old her family moved to a labor camp in El Monte, California, where her father worked at an aluminum foundry. Her childhood experiences immigrating to the United States and subsequent living conditions were the inspiration for the autobiographical fiction stories My Very Own Room/Mi propio cuartito and My Diary From Here to There/Mi diario de aqui hasta alla.

While in grade school Amada taught her mother English, while her mother taught her in Spanish. This would become the foundation of Amada's interest in teaching. She earned her B.A. in English from California Polytechnic State University and her master's degree in Education Administration from California Lutheran University.

== Professional background ==
Perez was a school teacher for over thirty years before retiring officially from teaching. Despite this Perez still lectures and holds writing workshops across the country. Perez began to write her books as she noticed there was a lack of children's literature about immigration in the late 1990s. Her first book was written in 1998 at the Southwest Writing Project (SCWriP) at UCSB and contact with Harriet Rohmer, who was executive director of the then Children's Book Press. After winning the Tomas Rivera Children's Book Award, Perez's book My Very Own Room/Mi propio cuartito was included as part of the "Born to Read Program" in San Antonio, Texas. This service provides newborns with a copy of selected books in order to provide the parents with enriching children's literature to encourage reading. Perez would go on to have two more books published through Children's Book Press, those being My Diary From Here to There/Mi diario de aqui hasta alla and Nana's Big Surprise: Nana, Que Sorpresa! in 2002 and 2007 respectively. All of Perez' works have been bilingual, as she states "...it's important for these children to have pride in themselves, for them to be proud of who they are, of their languages, of their culture and language is a huge window into the culture..." Perez's books have sold over a total of 100,000 copies combined.

Perez has been a multicultural understanding advocate through the use of themes in her autobiographical children's literature, such as poverty and importance of family which transcend the boundaries that are often associated with culture as she states “I think people will relate to my book, even if they are not Latino, even if they're adults and have their own room, I'm interested in helping people understand each other better,” she added. “There's a message there for anybody who wants to see it.”

== Influence of Perez's works ==
=== Immigration ===
Immigration is a consistent theme throughout all of Perez's text. She uses her own immigration experience to normalize this journey and give readers and opportunity to connect to the text. The family at the center of all of Perez's works is one that recently made the journey across the US-Mexico border. In My Diary from Here to There, the young girl who is narrating the story writes about feelings of sadness and fear towards leaving her home in Mexico. Some of the other concerns she voices include not being able to speak in her native tongue, worrying about whether she will ever see her best friend again and if her family will ever get the chance to return to Mexico. Through My Diary From Here to There, Perez shows the story of an entire family coming to the United States legally, as they were waiting on green cards while the Father worked in fields. Perez's work is attempting to relate and represent young children who share the experiences of the main character. In older Mexican literature, children felt they were being presented with lectura over literature, or scholarly material over recreational reading. With these books, Perez makes efforts to appeal to her audience by telling the story through her younger self's perspective.

=== Writings about the borderlands ===
In My Diary From Here to There, the line “We drove right along the border, across from New Mexico and Arizona. Mexico and the U.S. are two different countries, but they look exactly the same on both sides of the border, with giant saguaros pointing up at the pink-orange sky and enormous clouds.” Readers are presented with a description of this borderland space from the eyes of a child and end up with a point of view that does not recognize the difference in the spaces. This also illustrates young Amada's feelings of conflict towards leaving her family home in Juarez, Mexico. Throughout this text, Young Amada mentions the opportunities her family will have after moving, but it does not seem like she understands what this means. The works of Gloria Anzaldua make the experience of a Latina women to be “an inner war” while she struggles with both cultures, also characterizing this feeling as a choque or crash. As young Amada is just entering the new country and has not yet experienced the cultural collision, and therefore is unaware of the border will have on her. The character's experience, or lack thereof, speaks on the difficulty recently emigrated individuals may experience upon starting life in the United States such as having to work through language barriers or not having enough social or emotional support.

== Published works ==
- My Very Own Room/Mi propio cuartito
- My Diary From Here to There/Mi diario de aqui hasta alla
- Nana's Big Surprise: Nana, Que Sorpresa!
- Del desierto a la jungla
