= José-Luis Orozco =

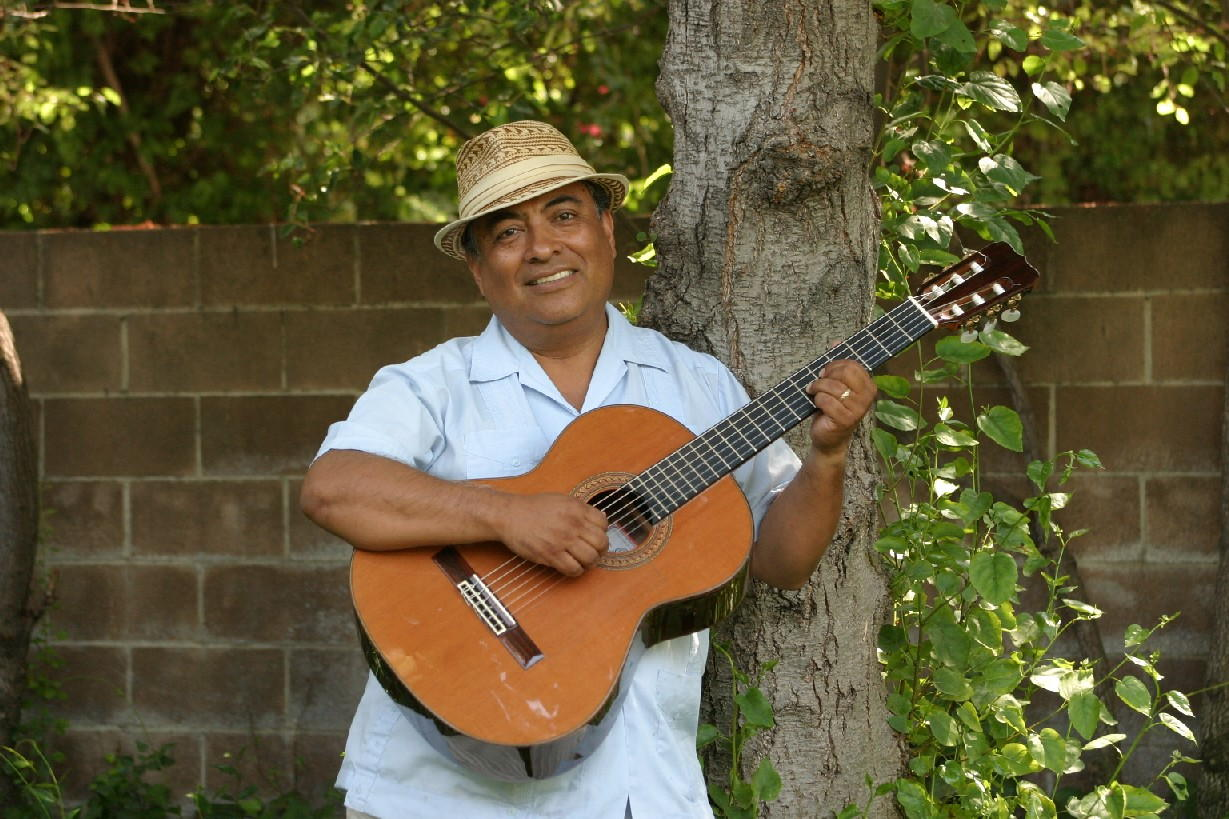

Background information
- Born: May 6, 1948 (age 78)
- Website: joseluisorozco.com

José-Luis Orozco (born May 6, 1948) is a bilingual (Spanish-English) children's author, educator, and recording artist.

He has written five award-winning books, De Colores and Other Latin American Folk Songs for Children (Dutton, 1994), Diez Deditos — Ten Little Fingers (Dutton, 1997), Fiestas (Dutton, 2002), Rin Rin Rin Do Re Mi (Scholastic, 2005) and Sing With Me - Canta Conmigo (Scholastic, 2020). Orozco recorded 13 volumes of Lírica Infantil, Latin American Children's Music and his songs have been taught by three generations of teachers. Orozco is a presenter at educational conferences and seminars for teachers, parents, librarians and childcare providers who seek to use music as an important learning tool in multicultural classrooms.

== Personal life ==
José-Luis Orozco was born in Mexico City. He is the second of eleven children born to Fernando Orozco and Susana Ramos. His father played the violin and his mother loved to sing. He grew fond of music at a young age, learning many songs from his paternal grandmother. At age 8, José-Luis became a member of the Mexico City Boy's Choir, and traveled the world visiting 32 countries in Europe, the Caribbean, Central and South America. It was from his tour around the world that he gained the cultural knowledge he now shares with children through his books and recordings.

At age 19, José-Luis moved to California. He attended Laney Community College in Oakland California, later he earned his bachelor's degree in Development Studies from the University of California, Berkeley and a master's degree in Multicultural Education from the University of San Francisco.

José-Luis Orozco is the father of four and grandfather to four children. He currently lives in Santa Cruz, California.

== Career ==
At age 8, José-Luis became a member of the Mexico City Boy's Choir, and traveled the world visiting 32 countries in Europe, the Caribbean, Central and South America. It was from his tour around the world that he gained the cultural knowledge he now shares with children through his books and recordings.

José-Luis Orozco first started performing music for children in 1970. From the beginning of his career, Orozco included bilingual songs in his repertoire, even though many of the children in his audiences did not speak Spanish.

In 1971, Orozco released the first of 20 volumes for children, Lirica Infantil: Latin American Children's Music, on the Bilingual Media Productions label. The album featured classic songs from Mexican, Central, and South American culture, including Guantanamera and Los Pollitos.

During the 1970s, 1980s, 1990s, 2000s, 2010s and 2020s Orozco has kept up a busy touring schedule, often giving his support to the bilingual education movement in the United States. The Association of Mexican American Educators honored him in 1995.

In 1990, he received the Leadership Award from the California Association for Bilingual Education. In 1994, he produced a bilingual songbook, De Colores, which won an American Library Association Notable Award and the American Children's Book Award, Commended List. He went on to write four other award-winning publications, Diez Deditos — Ten Little Fingers (Dutton 1997), Fiestas (Dutton 2002), Rin Rin Rin Do Re Mi (Scholastic, 2005) and Sing With Me - Canta Conmigo (Scholastic, 2020). CDs of De Colores, Diez Deditos and Fiestas, present a bilingual collection of songs, rhymes, tongue twisters, lullabies, games and holiday celebrations gathered from Spanish-speaking countries.

In 2003, José-Luis released a video and DVD entitled Cantamos y Aprendemos con José-Luis Orozco — Singing and Learning with José-Luis Orozco, filled with live action, animation, and Latino flavor that motivates children to learn about the Spanish language and the rich tradition of Latin American children's music.

In 2005, Orozco wrote Rin, Rin, Rin...Do, Re, Mi, a lyrical bilingual children's book illustrated by Caldecott Medal winner, David Díaz. This publication shows how everyday family activities such as cooking, singing, reading and storytelling foster essential early literacy skills such as letter recognition and language development. Rin, Rin, Rin...Do, Re, Mi is the first book in a series set for publication and distribution by Scholastic's Latino initiative Lee y Serás (Read and You Will Be), which was created to improve the reading and literacy development of Latino children.

In 2003 and again in 2005, José-Luis Orozco was invited to participate in the National Book Festival organized by the Library of Congress and hosted by First Lady, Laura Bush. During the festivities in 2003, the Congressional Hispanic Caucus in Washington, D.C. honored Mr. Orozco.

José-Luis Orozco continues to perform for children throughout the country and world at concert halls, libraries, bookstores and schools.

== Founding member ==
- National Hispanic University, Oakland, CA (Vice-Chancellor 1980–1985)
- BAHIA, Berkeley, CA
- Centro Vida, Berkeley, CA
- Adelante, Berkeley, CA
- California Association for Bilingual Association (CABE), 1975
- National Association for Bilingual Association (NABE), 1975
- Arcoiris Records, Inc. - Founder and Owner

== Awards and recognitions ==
- CABE (California Association for Bilingual Education)CABE Board Legacy Award, Long Beach, CA. 2023.
- CABE (California Association for Bilingual Education) Leadership Award, San Francisco, CA., 1990.
- CABE (California Association for Bilingual Education) Radio Host and Recording Artist of the Year & Recognition as Bilingual Educator, 1990
- American Librarians Association - American Children's Book Award Commended List: De Colores and Latin American Folk Songs for Children, 1994 Notable Book Recognition, 1994.
- AMAE (Association of Mexican American Educators) Outstanding Dedication and Service to Latinos, Montebello Chapter, 1995.
- AMAE (Association of Mexican American Educators) Outstanding and Dedicated Service to Students, Montebello Chapter, 1995.
- AMAE (Association of Mexican American Educators) Recognition for Fine Arts Entertainment and Bilingual Educator, 1996.
- AMAE (Association of Mexican-American Educators) Outstanding and Dedicated Service to Students Award, Montebello, CA., 1996.
- CABE (California Association for Bilingual Education) Exemplary Fine Arts/Entertainment Award, San Jose, CA, 1996.
- AMAE (Association of Mexican-American Educators) - El Fuego Nuevo Award, San Francisco, CA., 1996.
- Book Review Association - Nominee/ Best Bilingual Children's Book - San Francisco Bay Area, 1998.
- Parent's Choice Foundation - Best recommended Recording: Arrullos/Lullabies In Spanish, 2000.
- California State Senate -The Cesar E. Chavez Legacy Award, Berkeley, CA., 2002.
- KGO Channel 7 ABC -Profiles of Excellence Award, San Francisco, CA., 2002.
- Induction to the U.S. Office of Congress Records by the National Hispanic Congress Caucus for Leadership Contribution in Education and Music - Washington D.C. 2002.
- Latino Literature Hall of Fame.
- American Immigration Law Foundation -The American Heritage Award, New Orleans, LA., 2003.
- Familias Unidas - The Community Service Award, Los Angeles, CA. 2003.
- Los Angeles Music & Art School -Leadership in Arts Education Award, 2005.
- Honored by the Association of Bilingual Directors Affiliated with the Los Angeles County Office of Education, 2009
- The California Assembly - Latino Legislative Caucus -The Latino Spirit Award, 2011.
- Mexican American Legal Defense and Educational Fund (MALDEF)- Lifetime Achievement in the Arts and Education Award, 2011.
- Hall of Fame of La Peña Cultural Center, Berkeley, CA, 2014.
- Grammy Nomination for the bilingual Children's recording "Eat Right-Come Bien" produced by Smithsonian Institution-Folkways Records and Grammy Award winner Quetzal Flores, Los Angeles, CA 2016.
- Children's International Music Network - Magic Penny Award, Los Gatos, CA, 2016.
- Family Parents Choice Award for the Bilingual Children's Recording ¡Muévete! Songs for a Healthy Mind in a Healthy Body produced by Smithsonian Institution Folkways Records and Grammy Award winner Quetzal Flores, 2020.
- Latino International Book Awards - First Place for Best Children's Fiction Picture Bilingual Book "Sing with Me/ Canta conmigo", Sep., 12, 2020
- Legacy Board Award -California Association for Bilingual Education -CABE March 23, 2023

== Invitations to the White House ==
- Special First Invitation as Bilingual Author by First Lady Laura Bush, 2003.
- Special Second Invitation as Bilingual Author by First Lady Laura Bush, 2005.
- Special Third Invitation as Bilingual Children's Author to the White House Easter Family Celebration, 2016.

== Presidential invitations ==
- President of Guatemala: Ignacio Ydígoras Fuentes, Presidential Palace - Guatemala City 1958
- President of Honduras: Dr. Ramón Villeda Morales, Presidential Palace- Casa Amarilla - Tegucigalpa, Honduras 1959
- President of Argentina: Arturo Frondizi, Presidential Palace - Casa Rosada - Buenos Aires, Argentina, 1959
- President of Venezuela, Rómulo Betancourt and visiting President of México Adolfo López Mateos, also present former President of Venezuela Rómulo Gallegos - Caracas, Venezuela 1960.
- Princess Grace Kelly and Prince Raniere of Mónaco at the Palace of Mónaco, 1961.

== Recordings ==
- Les Petits Chanteurs Du Mexique, Philips Records, Paris France 1960.
- Petits Enfants Du Monde Entier - Philips Réalités, Vol. 40, Paris, France 1960.
- Lirica Infantil, Songs, Games and Rhymes with José-Luis Orozco - Vol. 1, Arcoirs Records, Inc.1970-1985.
- Lirica Infantil, Songs, Games and Rhymes with José-Luis Orozco - Vol. 2, Arcoirs Records, Inc.1970-1985.
- Lirica Infantil, Songs, Games and Rhymes with José-Luis Orozco - Vol. 3, Arcoirs Records, Inc.1985.
- Lirica Infantil, Animales y Movimiento con José-Luis Orozco - Vol. 4, Arcoirs Records, Inc. 1987.
- Lirica Infantil, Letras Números y Colores con José-Luis Orozco - Vol. 5, Arcoirs Records, Inc.
- Fiestas - A Year of Latin American Songs of Celebration with José-Luis Orozco - Vol. 6, Arcoirs Records, Inc.1988.
- Navidad y Pancho Claus (Christmas and Pancho Claus) with José-Luis Orozco - Vol. 7, Arcoirs Records, Inc.1989.
- Arrullos (Lullabies in Spanish) with José-Luis Orozco Vol. 8, Arcoirs Records, Inc.1993.
- De Colores (Bright with Colors) with José-Luis Orozco Vol. 9, Arcoirs Records, Inc.1994.
- Corridos Mexicanos y Chicanos (Mexican & Chicano Ballads) with José-Luis Orozco - Vol. 10, Arcoirs Records, Inc.1980-1999.
- Esta es mi tierra (This Land Is My Land) with José-Luis Orozco – Vol. 11, Arcoirs Records, Inc. 2001
- Diez Deditos (Ten Little Fingers) with José-Luis Orozco - Vol. 12, Arcoirs Records, Inc.
- Canto y Cuento (Sing & Tell) with José-Luis Orozco - Vol. 13, Arcoirs Records, Inc.1996.
- Rin, Rin, Rin, Do, Re, Mi - with José-Luis Orozco Vol. 14, Arcoirs Records, Inc.2005.
- Caramba Kids with José-Luis Orozco Arcoirs Records, Inc.2006.
- ¡Come Bien! Eat Right! - Nutrition Bilingual Songs with José-Luis Orozco, Smithsonian Folkways Recordings, Washington, DC 2015 (1st Bilingual Children's Grammy Nomination 2016).
- ¡Muévete! Songs for a Healthy Mind in a Healthy Body! - Canciones para una Mente Sana en un Cuerpo Sano with José-Luis Orozco, Smithsonian Folkways Recordings, Washington, DC 2020.

== Books ==
- Cancionero de Lirica Infantil by José-Luis Orozco - Songs, Games, Rhymes, Lullabies and Tongue twisters- Vol. 1
- Cancionero de Lirica Infantil by José-Luis Orozco - Songs, Games, Rhymes, Lullabies and Tongue twisters - Vol. 2
- Cancionero de Lirica Infantil, by José-Luis Orozco - Songs, Games, Rhymes, Lullabies and Tongue twisters - Vol. 3
- Cancionero de Lirica Infantil, by José-Luis Orozco - Animales y Movimiento - Vol. 4
- Cancionero de Lirica Infantil, by José-Luis Orozco - Números y Colores - Vol. 5
- Fiestas - A Year of Latin American Songs of Celebration by José-Luis Orozco - Penguin-Random House, New York, NY 2002
- Cancionero de Navidad y Pancho Claus (Christmas and Pancho Claus) by José-Luis Orozco - Vol. 7
- Cancioneros de Arrullos (Lullabies in Spanish) by José-Luis Orozco - Vol. 8
- De Colores and Other Latin-American Folk Songs for Children (Bright with Colors) by José-Luis Orozco - Penguin-Random House, New York, NY 1994
- Cancionero de Corridos Mexicanos y Chicanos (Mexican & Chicano Ballads) by José-Luis Orozco- Vol. 10
- Cancionero de Esta es mi tierra (This Land Is My Land) by José-Luis Orozco – Vol. 11
- Diez Deditos-Ten Little Fingers and Other Play Rhymes and Action Songs from Latin America by José-Luis Orozco - Penguin-Random House, New York, NY 1997
- Cancionero de Canto y Cuento (Sing & Tell) by José-Luis Orozco - Vol. 13
- Rin, Rin, Rin, Do, Re, Mi - Lee y Serás by José-Luis Orozco - Scholastic, Inc., New York, NY 2005
- Canta Conmigo - Sing With Me by José-Luis Orozco - Scholastic, Inc., New York, NY 2020

== Other media, publications and participation ==
- Unidad Cultural de la Raza K-12, BMP (Bilingual Media Productions) Berkeley, CA 1976
- Song: Paz y Libertad book/CD "I’ll Be Your Friend" - Southern Poverty Law Center, 2003
- Song: El Corrido de Dolores Huerta in the book Here's to the Women by Hilda Wenner and Elizabeth Eilicher, Feminist Pr, 1991
- Song: El Corrido de Cesar Chavez CD "Ramilletes" by Coro Hispano de San Francisco, 2003
- Song: Paz y Libertad-Peace and Liberty book/CD "Rise up and Sing" by Peter Blood and Anne Patterson, Sing Out Publications, 2012
- Song: Paz y Libertad CD/Book by Jose-Luis Orozco, Arcoiris Records, Inc., 1982
- Song: Paz y Libertad - Amazon.com, Spotify, Google Play Music, Pandora, CD Baby, iTunes, Apple Music, etc.

Newspapers Interviews: Los Angeles Times, Austin American-Statesman, El Sentinel, San Diego Union-Tribune Enlace, Sun Sentinel, The Salt Lake Tribune, Corpus Christi Caller Times, NBC Latino, El Nuevo Herald, The Berkeley DailyPlanet (Mary Barrett), The Miami Herald, La Opinion de Los Angeles (Tío Caimán), El Mundo de Oakland (Alberto Ampuero).

TV Interviews: CNN, NBC, ABC, CBS, FOX, UNIVISION, TELEVISA, TELEMUNDO and TV AZTECA.

Radio Interviews: Maria Hinojosa-NPR (National Public Radio), KPFA FM (Pacifica Radio), KPFK FM (Pacifica Radio), Radio Bilingüe (Samuel Orozco, Chelis López,), Adolfo Guzmán-Lopez/KPCC (NPR), Mandalit del Barco (NPR National Public Radio).

== Radio and TV host ==
- TV Program Aquí y Ahora con la Comunidad - Channel 6 - Berkeley, CA 1971 - 1976.
- Ahora con los Niños Bilingual Program Radio Host - KPFA - Berkeley, CA 1987 - 1992.

== Films, Videos (DVD) and documentaries ==
- Film El Sordo, Zacarias Films, 1959.
- The Sea of Cortéz, 1978.
- Los padres somos maestros - Migrant Media Productions, 1985.
- La Huelga de Watsonville - Migrant Media Productions, 1987.
- Los Dinosaurios - Migrant Media Productions, 1990.
- Cantamos y Aprendemos con José-Luis Orozco - Arcoiris Records, Inc.2004.
