= ¡Ándale, Prieta! =

2022 non-fiction book

¡Ándale, Prieta! A Love Letter to My Family
- Author: Yasmín Ramírez
- Language: English
- Subject: Hispanic and Latin American Culture
- Genre: Memoir
- Publisher: Cinco Puntos Press
- Publication date: 2 August 2022
- Pages: 272
- ISBN: 978-1-94762-755-0
- Website: www.leeandlow.com/books/andale-prieta

¡Ándale, Prieta! A Love Letter to My Family is a 2022 memoir by Yasmín Ramírez, a Mexican–American writer and associate professor of English and creative writing at El Paso Community College. She was motivated to write the memoir after the death of her maternal grandmother, Ita.

== Synopsis ==
In the book, Ramírez tells about growing up in El Paso, Texas. The stars of the book are the women in her life: her great grandmother Lupe, her mother Leticia, and most importantly, her grandmother Ita.

In the second half of the book she also explores her strained relationship with her absent father.

The title reclaims the sometimes derogatory term prieta, which her grandmother used as a nickname for the author, but which is often used in Spanish as a slur to describe people with dark skin.

== Reception ==
Kirkus Reviews praised the book's "vivid imagery" and declared it to be a "promising debut". Book Riot selected ¡Ándale, Prieta! as a "Most Anticipated Book of 2022" and praised the writing for being both "rich" and "casual".

== Author ==
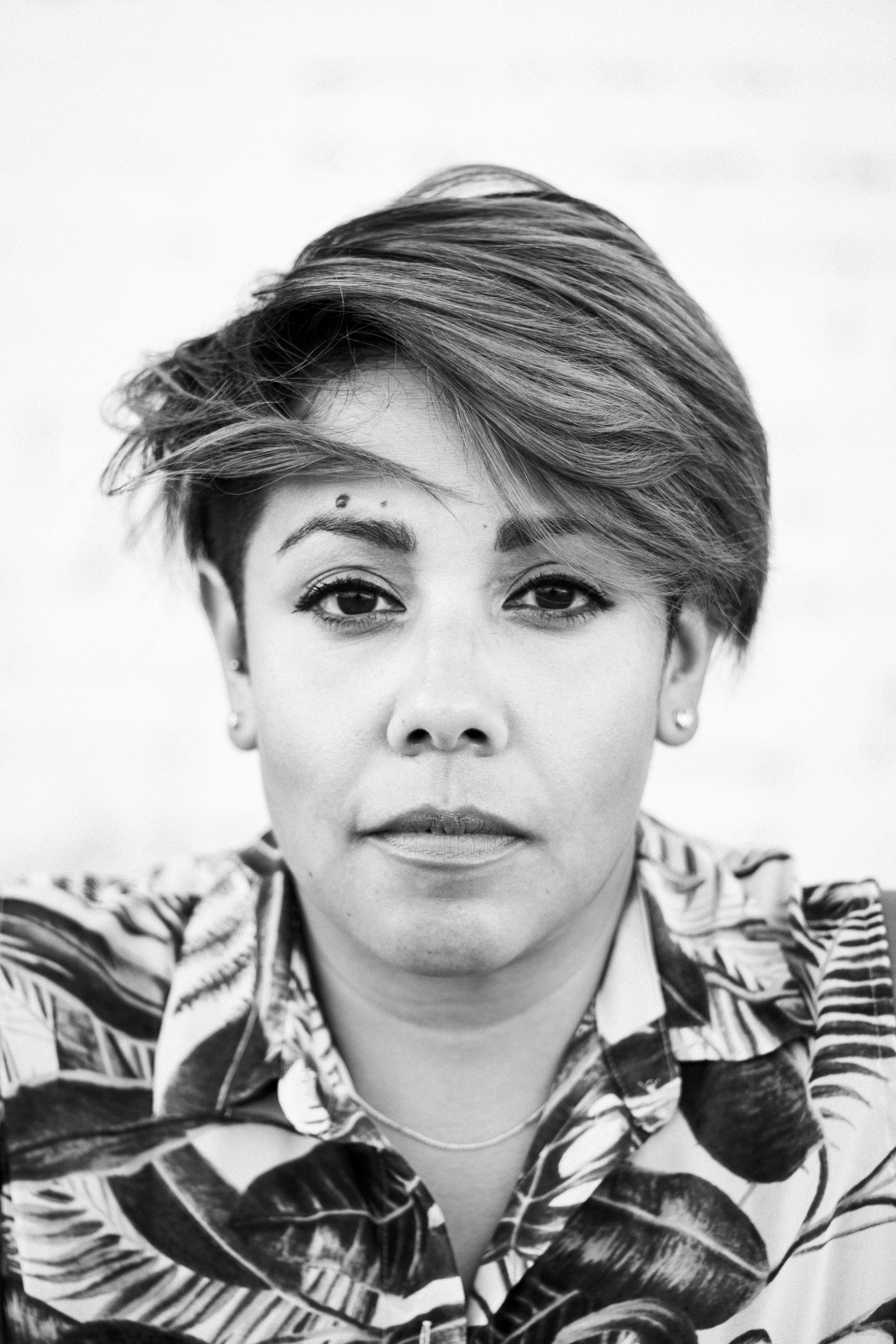
Ramírez in 2020

Ramírez completed an MFA in the Bilingual Creative Writing program at the University of Texas at El Paso. She is an associate professor of English and creative writing at El Paso Community College. She has published a number of short stories and was a 2021 Martha's Vineyard Institute of Creative Writing Writing Author Fellow.

¡Ándale, Prieta! started as her thesis and took four or five years to complete.
