= René Saldaña Jr. =

American poet, novelist and educator

- Born: McAllen, Texas
- Occupations: poet, novelist and educator
- Known for: Advocate for Chicano literature for children and young adults
- Notable work: The Jumping Tree; The Whole Sky Full of Stars

René Saldaña Jr. is an American poet, novelist and educator. Currently, he is an associate professor of language and literature in the College of Education at Texas Tech University. He is also the author of several books for young readers, best known for The Jumping Tree and The Whole Sky Full of Stars. His publications have received many positive reviews and recognition from several literary circles.

== Life ==
Saldaña Jr. was born in McAllen, Texas but grew up in Peñitas, a small town near McAllen. He lives with his wife and three sons in Lubbock, Texas. He obtained a B.A. in English at Bob Jones University, a M.A. in English at Clemson University and a Ph.D. at Georgia State University for English and creative writing. He spent six years teaching middle school and high school. He is currently an associate professor in the College of Education at Texas Tech University, teaching language, diversity, and literacy studies.

== Literary contributions ==
Saldaña Jr. was awarded the Humanities Texas Grant for his work supporting young adults. Specifically, he is an advocate for Chicano literature for children and young adults. His book The Jumping Tree was listed as one of the “Top Ten First Novels for Youth” by the American Library Association Booklist in 2001 and named among the “Best Children’s Books of the Year” by the Bank Street College of Education in 2002.

== Works ==
- A Mystery Bigger than Big: A Mickey Rangel Mystery. Houston TX: Arte Público/Piñata Books, 2016.
- Heartbeat of the Soul of the World: Stories. Donna TX: Juventud Press, 2015.
- A Good Long Way. Houston TX: Arte Público P/Piñata Books, 2010.
- The Whole Sky Full of Stars (novel), Wendy Lamb Books (New York, NY), 2007.
- Finding Our Way (stories), Wendy Lamb Books (New York, NY), 2003.
- The Jumping Tree. New York: Random House/Delacorte, 2001.
- “Why Not Hugs and Tugs Instead of Thugs? People of Color Interacting Positively in Picture Books.” Bookbird: A Journal of International Children's Literature. (In-Press).
- “Forgive Me My Bluntness: I’m a Writer of Color and I’m Right Here In Front of You: I’m the One Sitting Alone at the Table.” September 8, 2014.
- “Mexican American YA Lit: Literature with a Capital ‘L.’” The ALAN Review: 39.2. Winter 2012.
- “The Case of the Missing Mexican American Detective Stories: Mystery Solved?” The ALAN Review: 39.1. Fall 2011.
- “Mestizaje: Forging Identity Through Hybridity.” A chapter in Young Adult Literature and Adolescent Identity Across Cultures and Classrooms: Contexts for the Literary Lives of Teens, edited by Janet Alsup. Routledge. 2010.
