= Will Hobbs =

American children's book author

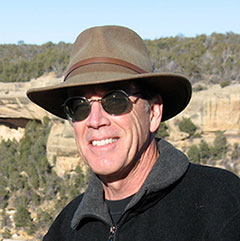
- Born: William Carl Hobbs; August 22, 1947 (age 79); Pittsburgh, Pennsylvania, U.S.
- Died: March 31, 2025; Durango, Colorado, U.S.
- Education: Stanford University (BA, MA)
- Occupation: Writer of books for young readers
- Spouse: Jean (m. 1972)
- Writing career
- Genre: outdoor adventure
- Notable works: Far North; Crossing the Wire; Downriver; Bearstone
- Website: www.willhobbsauthor.com

Will Hobbs (August 22, 1947 - March 31, 2025) is the American author of twenty novels for upper elementary, middle school and young adult readers, as well as two picture book stories. Hobbs credits his sense of audience to his fourteen years of teaching reading and English in southwest Colorado. When he turned to writing, he set his stories mostly in wild places he knew from firsthand experience. Hobbs has said he wants to “take young people into the outdoors and engage their sense of wonder.” Bearstone, his second novel, gained national attention when it took the place of Where the Red Fern Grows as the unabridged novel in Prentice-Hall's 7th grade literature anthology. Downriver and Far North were selected by the American Library Association for its list of the 100 Best Young Adult Books of the 20th century.

== Biography ==
William Carl Hobbs grew up in an Air Force family and was raised in the Panama Canal Zone, Virginia, Alaska Territory, northern and southern California, and Texas. He was the middle child of five born to Mary Ann (Rhodes) Hobbs and Gregory J. Hobbs. “During the years we were living in Alaska,” Hobbs has written, “I fell in love with mountains, rivers, fishing, baseball, and books.” He attended Central Catholic High School in San Antonio, Texas, for three years, and graduated from Marin Catholic High School in Kentfield, California, in 1965. In 1969 Will Hobbs graduated from Stanford University with a B.A. in English. His M.A. in English from Stanford followed in 1971. He and his wife, Jean, were married in December 1972. Drawn by the San Juan Mountains to southwestern Colorado, they found teaching jobs in Pagosa Springs. After four years they resettled in the Durango area, where Hobbs taught for ten years at Miller Junior High. Summers he devoted to writing, backpacking, and rowing his whitewater raft through the canyons of the Southwest. Hobbs rowed ten trips down the Grand Canyon. In 1990 he began writing full-time. His professional travels have taken him to 47 states, Canada, and Germany, where six of his novels have been published in the German language. Other foreign editions have appeared in Sweden, the Czech Republic, Italy, the Netherlands, and the U.K.

== Works ==
- Changes in Latitudes (1988)
- Bearstone (1989)
- Downriver (1991)
- The Big Wander (1992)
- Beardance (1993)
- Kokopelli's Flute (1995)
- Far North (1996)
- Beardream (1997, illustrated by Jill Kastner)
- Ghost Canoe (1997)
- River Thunder (1997)
- The Maze (1998)
- Howling Hill (1998, illustrated by Jill Kastner)
- Jason's Gold (1999)
- Down the Yukon (2001)
- Wild Man Island (2002)
- Jackie's Wild Seattle (2003)
- Leaving Protection (2004)
- Crossing The Wire (2006)
- Go Big or Go Home (2008)
- Take Me to the River (2011)
- Never Say Die (2013)
- City of Gold (2020)

== Awards ==
- 1990 Mountains and Plains Booksellers Regional Book Award Winner for Bearstone
- 1992 Colorado Blue Spruce Young Adult Book Award Winner for Changes in Latitudes
- 1993 Colorado Book Award Winner for Beardance
- 1993 Spur Award Winner, Western Writers of America for Beardance
- 1995 California Young Reader Medal Winner for Downriver
- 1996 Spur Award Winner, Western Writers of America for Far North
- 1997-98 Colorado Blue Spruce Young Adult Book Award Winner for Downriver
- 1997 Colorado Book Award Winner for Far North
- 1998 Colorado Book Award Winner for Beardream, illustrated by Jill Kastner
- 1998 Edgar Allan Poe Award, Best Young Adult Mystery for Ghost Canoe
- 1998 Colorado Book Award Winner for Ghost Canoe
- 2002 Land of Enchantment Book Award Winner (NM) for Ghost Canoe
- 2006 Wyoming Paintbrush Award Winner for Down the Yukon
- 2007 Southwest Book Award Winner for Crossing the Wire
- 2008 Heartland Award Winner (KS) for Crossing the Wire
- 2009 Mountains and Plains Booksellers Regional Book Award Winner for Go Big or Go Home
- 2020 Junior Library Guild Gold Standard Selection Award for City of Gold

=== Lifetime/Body of Work Awards ===
- 1998 Thomas Hornsby Ferril Lifetime Literary Achievement Award (CO)
- 1999 Arizona Author Award, Arizona Library Association
- 2001 Frank Waters Award, Pikes Peak Library (CO)

== Author video ==
- Tim Podell interviews Will Hobbs for Good Conversations
