= Mario Bencastro =

Salvadoran novelist and painter

Mario Bencastro (born 1949) is a Salvadoran novelist and painter who has also written both plays and short stories that have been published in Spanish and English.

Mario Bencastro was born in Ahuachapán, El Salvador. For over 20 years he resided in Northern Virginia, United States near Washington DC, but in recent years he has moved to Port Saint Lucie, Florida. His works primarily concern the Salvadoran Civil War and its aftermath, including the Salvadoran Diaspora.

== Select bibliography ==
Novels

- El árbol de la vida, (1983)
- Disparo en la catedral, (1989)
- Odisea del norte, (1998)

Drama

- Crossroads (1988)
