= Claudia Guadalupe Martinez =

American children's book author

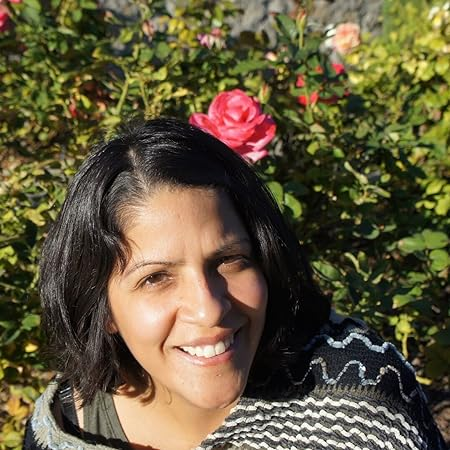
- Claudia Guadalupe Martinez at the El Paso Rose Garden
- Occupation: Novelist
- Writing career
- Language: English
- Years active: 2008–present
- Genres: Young adult fiction, middle grade fiction, picture books
- Notable work: The Smell of Old Lady Perfume
- Notable awards: Texas Institute of Letters Best Young Adult Book Award
- Website: www.claudiaguadalupemartinez.com

Claudia Guadalupe Martinez is an American author of children's books, best known for her middle grade contemporary debut The Smell of Old Lady Perfume. Her works include middle grade fiction, young adult fiction, and picture books.

== Personal life ==
Martinez grew up in El Paso, Texas. She started wanting to become a writer when she was six years old.

Her father died when she was eleven, an experience which she drew inspiration from for what would become her debut novel, The Smell of Old Lady Perfume.

She now lives in Chicago.

== Career ==
=== The Smell of Old Lady Perfume ===
Her debut novel, a middle grade contemporary titled The Smell of Old Lady Perfume, was published with Cinco Puntos Press in 2008. She wrote the first draft of the novel shortly before moving to Chicago and says that as somebody from El Paso, she grew up admiring the also El Paso–based publisher. When she first submitted the novel to the publisher, she received helpful feedback, but was ultimately declined. The novel is about Chela, a middle schooler whose father who has a stroke and subsequently dies and about how she deals with the loss of a parent.

The novel went on to win the 2009 Paterson Prize for Books for Young People, 2008 Texas Institute of Letters Best Young Adult Book Award, and a 2009 Americas Award Commendation.

=== Pig Park ===
Her next novel, Pig Park, is about Masi, a teenager who moves to Pig Park, a neighborhood in real-life Chicago, and builds a pyramid to garner tourist interest to raise money for her parents' failing bakery. It was published by Cinco Puntos Press in September 2014 and the novel won a 2015 Texas Institute of Letters Best Young Adult Book Award and a 2015 NAACS Tejas Foco Best YA Fiction Award, in addition to receiving a starred review from VOYA magazine.

=== Not a Bean ===
Her first picture book, Not a Bean, illustrated by Laura Gonzalez, was published by Charlesbridge in 2019. It received three starred reviews and was named to the 2021 Texas Topaz Reading List and the 2021–2022 VA Reads List by their respective state library associations.

=== Spirit Untamed: The Movie Novel ===
The official novel adaptation for the DreamWorks movie Spirit Untamed—which hit theaters June 4, 2021—was published by Little Brown Books for Young Readers April 2021. It has been translated into German and Polish, as well as turned into an audiobook.

=== Still Dreaming ===
Her second picture book, still Dreaming/Seguimos Soñando, illustrated by Madalena Mora, was published by Lee and Low in 2023. It was well reviewed in the New York Times Books. Awards include: IRC Notable Books for Global Society 2023, ALA Pure Belpre Award Honor for Illustration 2023, and Library Guild Award 2023.

=== Not a Monster ===
Not a Monster, illustrated by Laura Gonzalez, was published by Charlesbridge in 2023. It received a Kirkus starred review and was named to reading lists in many states, including: Washington, New Mexico, Texas, Illinois, South Carolina, Florida, and Louisiana.

=== Not a Dog ===
Not a Dog, illustrated by Laura Gonzalez, will be published by Charlesbridge in 2025. A starred review from Kirkus for the “Not a” book series raves that Not a Dog is “A worthy continuation of a stellar series.”
