= Arthur Dorros =

American writer

Arthur Dorros (born 1950) is an author and illustrator of children's books. He attended Pacific Oaks College and graduated from the University of Wisconsin.

Arthur Dorros was born in Washington, D.C. He is an American author of children's books. He graduated from the University of Wisconsin and learned to speak Spanish while traveling in Latin America. He has also worked as a carpenter, cook, draftsman, photographer and teacher.

Though Dorros says he always loved reading, he only decided to author children's books in his thirties, because he thought "it would be fun to put all those interests together and make children's picture books." Dorros has written many fiction and nonfiction picture books including Abuela, an ALA Notable Book, Julio's Magic, a CLASP Americas Award Commended Title, Feel the Wind, and Ant Cities. He's also received Orbis Pictus, the Parents' Choice, Notable Children's Trade Social Studies Books and the Pura Belpré Honor for his works. Several of his works are bilingual.

He currently lives in Seattle, Washington.

== Bibliography ==
- Abuela
- Abuelo
- Alligator Shoes
- Animals Talk
- Animal Tracks
- Ant Cities
- A Tree is Growing
- City Chicken
- Elephant Families
- Feel the Wind
- Follow the Water from Brook to Ocean
- Isla
- Julio's Magic
- Magic Secrets
- Mama and Me
- Numero Uno
- Papa and Me
- Radio Man/Don Radio
- Rain Forest Secrets
- Ten Go Tango
- The Fungus That Ate My School
- This is My House
- Tonight is Carnaval
- Under the Sun (novel)
- What Makes Day and Night
- When the Pigs Took Over
