= Pura Belpré Award =

Annual literary award for latinx authors and illustrators

- Awarded for: Excellent portrayal of the Latino experience in children's literature
- Country: United States
- Presented by: Association for Library Service to Children, a division of the American Library Association
- First award: 1996
- Website: ala.org/alsc/belpre

The Pura Belpré Award is a recognition presented to a Latino or Latina author and illustrator whose work best portrays the Latino cultural experience in a work of literature for children or youth. It was established in 1996. It was given every other year since 1996 until 2009 when it was changed to be given annually.

The award is named in honor of Pura Belpré, the first Latina librarian from the New York Public Library. As a children's librarian, storyteller, and author, she enriched the lives of Latino children through her pioneering work of preserving and disseminating Puerto Rican folklore.

The award is given by the Association for Library Service to Children (ALSC), a division of the American Library Association (ALA), and the National Association to Promote Library and Information Services to Latinos and the Spanish-Speaking (REFORMA).

== Criteria ==
From 1996 to 2020, two medals were awarded at ALA's annual conference, one to a Latinx author and one to a Latinx illustrator, for creating outstanding original children's (age 0–14) books that portray, affirm, and celebrate the Latinx cultural experience. Beginning in 2021, the author category was divided into two: one for a children's author and one for a young adult author. For the purpose of the award, "Latinx" is defined as people whose heritage emanates from any of the Spanish-speaking cultures of the Western Hemisphere.

To be eligible for the award, book must meet the following criteria:

- Published in the United States
- Author/illustrator is a resident or citizen of the United States
- Published in Spanish, English, or both

Books are judged individually, not based on the author/illustrator's body of work nor whether the author/illustrator has previously received the award. Honor books may be named, but if suitable candidates are not found, the awards will not be presented in that year. One person may be selected to receive the awards in both categories.

== Recipients ==
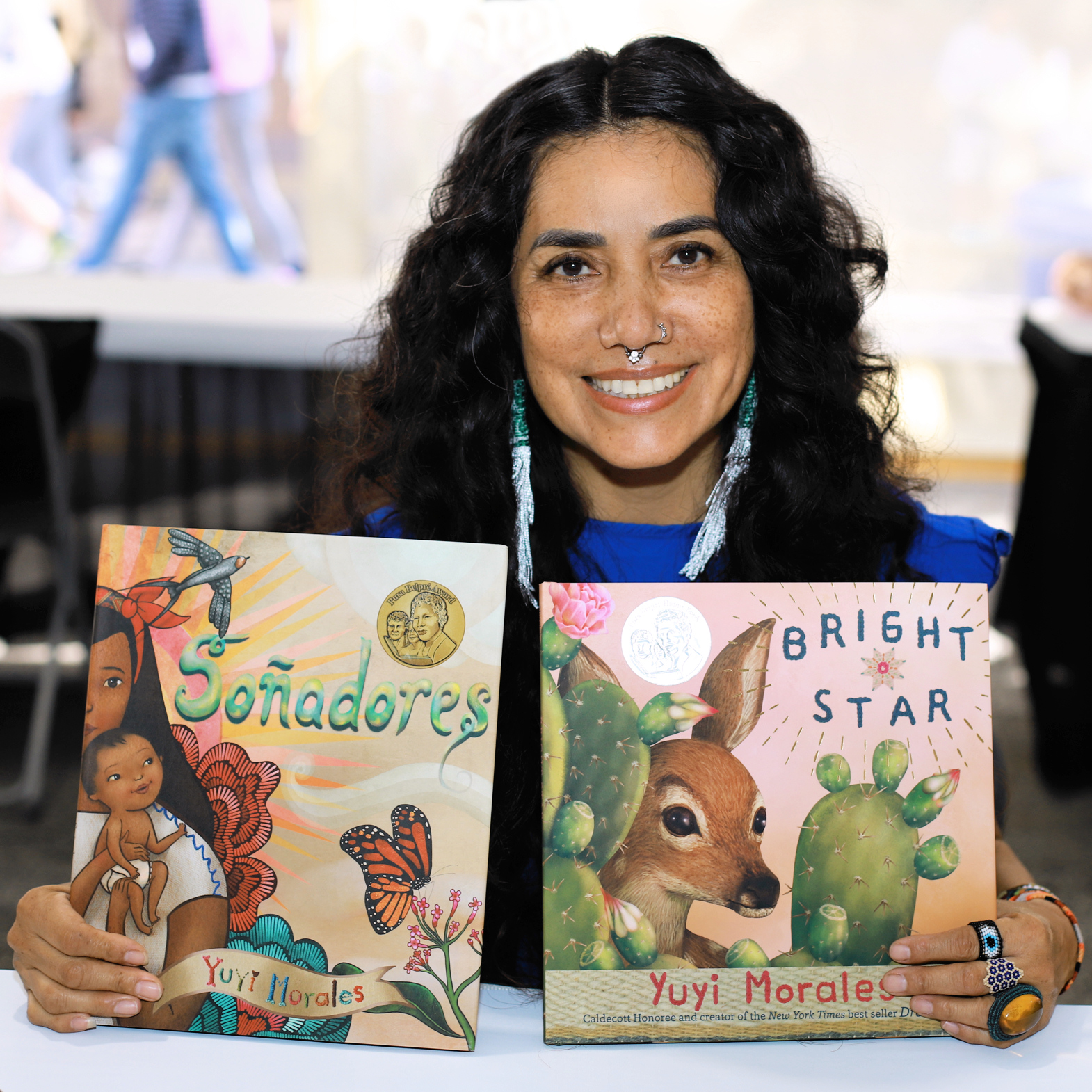
Yuyi Morales has won six Belpré Medals and four Honors as both author and illustrator.

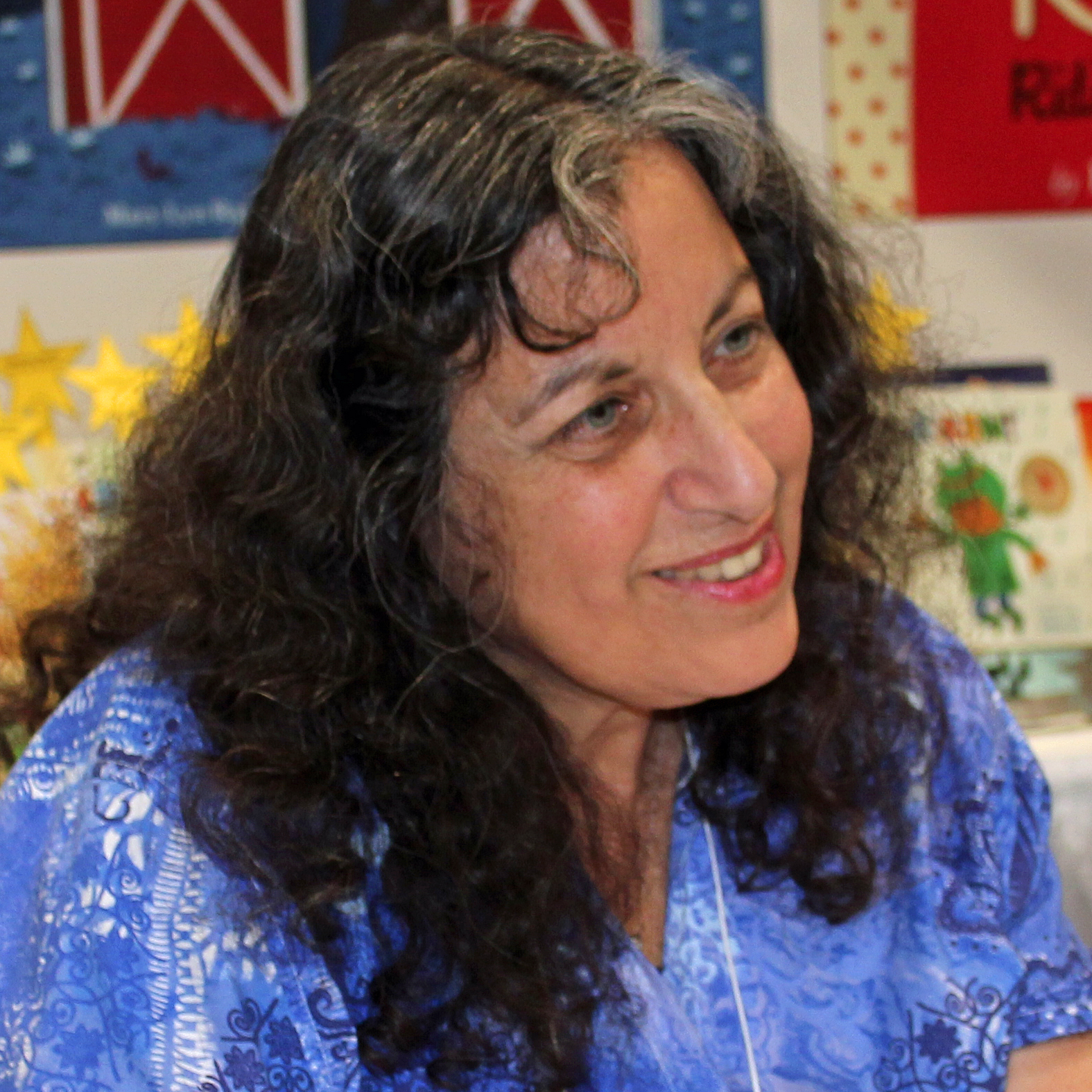
Margarita Engle has won three Medals and four Honors, all as an author.

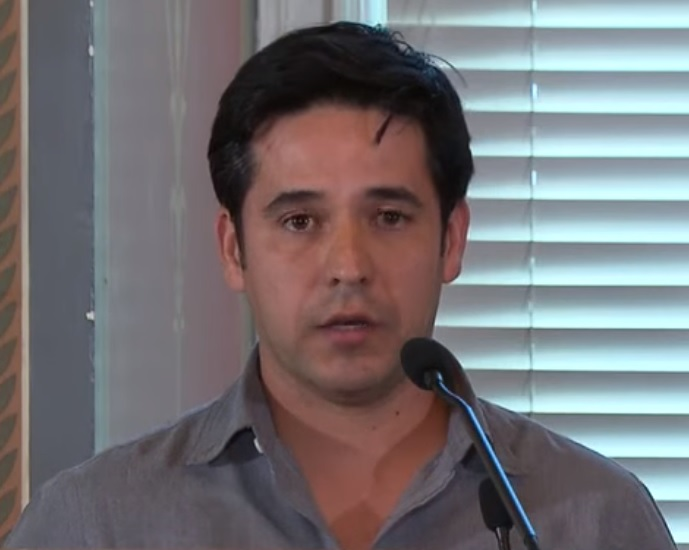
Duncan Tonatiuh has won one Medal and eight Honors as both author and illustrator.

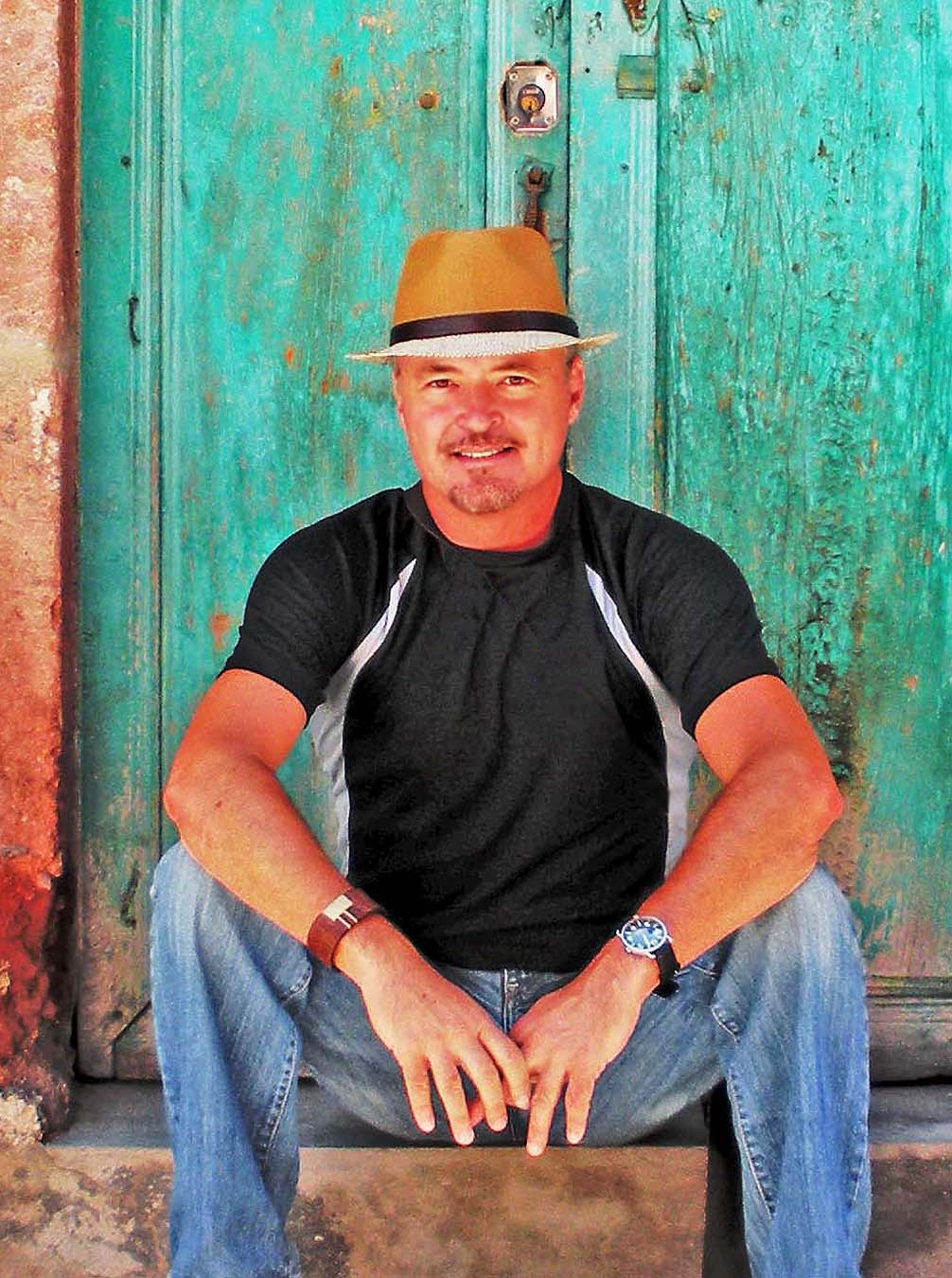
Rafael López won three Medals and three Honors in the role of illustrator.

Pura Belpré Medal winners and honors
Year	Category	Recipient	Title	Result	Ref.
1996	Author	Judith Ortiz Cofer	An Island Like You: Stories of the Barrio	Winner	
1996	Author	Lucía M. González	El Gallo de Bodas: A Traditional Cuban Folktale	Honor	
1996	Author	Gary Soto	Baseball in April, and Other Stories	Honor	
1996	Illustrator	Susan Guevara	Chato's Kitchen	Winner	
1996	Illustrator	George Ancona	Pablo Remembers: The Fiesta of the Day of the Dead	Honor	
1996	Illustrator	Lulu Delacre	El Gallo de Bodas: A Traditional Cuban Folktale	Honor	
1996	Illustrator	Carmen Lomas Garza	Cuadros de Familia	Honor	
1998	Author	Victor Martinez	Parrot in the Oven: Mi Vida	Winner	
1998	Author	Floyd Martinez	Spirits of the High Mesa	Honor	
1998	Author	Francisco X. Alarcón	Jitomates Risueños y otros poemas de primavera	Honor	
1998	Illustrator	Stephanie Garcia	Snapshots from the Wedding	Winner	
1998	Illustrator	Carmen Lomas Garza	En mi familia	Honor	
1998	Illustrator	Enrique O. Sánchez	The Golden Flower: a Taino Myth from Puerto Rico	Honor	
1998	Illustrator	Simón Silva	Gathering the Sun: an Alphabet in Spanish and English	Honor	
2000	Author	Alma Flor Ada	Under the Royal Palms: A Childhood in Cuba	Winner	
2000	Author	Francisco X. Alarcón	Del Ombligo de la Luna y Otro Poemas de Verano	Honor	
2000	Author	Juan Felipe Herrera	Laughing out Loud, I Fly: Poems in English and Spanish	Honor	
2000	Illustrator	Carmen Lomas Garza	Magic Windows	Winner	
2000	Illustrator	George Ancona	Barrio: José's Neighborhood	Honor	
2000	Illustrator	Felipe Dávalos	The Secret Stars	Honor	
2000	Illustrator	Amelia Lau Carling	Mama & Papa Have a Store	Honor	
2002	Author	Pam Muñoz Ryan	Esperanza Rising	Winner	
2002	Author	Francisco Jiménez	Breaking Through	Honor	
2002	Author	Francisco X. Alarcón	Iguanas in the Snow	Honor	
2002	Illustrator	Susan Guevara	Chato and the Party Animals	Winner	
2002	Illustrator	Joe Cepeda	Juan Bobo Goes to Work	Honor	
2004	Author	Julia Alvarez	Before We Were Free	Winner	
2004	Author	Nancy Osa	Cuba 15	Honor	
2004	Author	Amada Irma Pérez	Mi Diario de Aquí Hasta Allá	Honor	
2004	Illustrator	Yuyi Morales	Just a Minute: A Trickster Tale and Counting Book	Winner	
2004	Illustrator	Robert Casilla	First Day in Grapes	Honor	
2004	Illustrator	David Diaz	The Pot That Juan Built	Honor	
2004	Illustrator	Yuyi Morales	Harvesting Hope: The Story of Cesar Chavez	Honor	
2006	Author	Viola Canales	The Tequila Worm	Winner	
2006	Author	Carmen T. Bernier-Grand	César: ¡Sí, Se Puede! Yes, We Can!	Honor	
2006	Author	Pat Mora	Doña Flor: A Tall Tale About a Giant Woman with a Great Big Heart	Honor	
2006	Author	Pam Muñoz Ryan	Becoming Naomi León	Honor	
2006	Illustrator	Raúl Colón	Doña Flor: A Tall Tale About a Giant Woman with a Great Big Heart	Winner	
2006	Illustrator	Lulu Delacre	Arrorró, Mi Niño: Latino Lullabies and Gentle Games	Honor	
2006	Illustrator	David Diaz	César: ¡Sí, Se Puede! Yes, We Can!	Honor	
2006	Illustrator	Rafael López	Me Llamo Celia: La Vida de Celia Cruz	Honor	
2008	Author	Margarita Engle	The Poet Slave of Cuba: A Biography of Juan Francisco Manzano	Winner	
2008	Author	Carmen Agra Deedy	Martina the Beautiful Cockroach: A Cuban Folktale	Honor	
2008	Author	Carmen T. Bernier-Grand	Frida: ¡Viva la vida! Long Live Life!	Honor	
2008	Author	Marisa Montes	Los Gatos Black on Halloween	Honor	
2008	Illustrator	Yuyi Morales	Los Gatos Black on Halloween	Winner	
2008	Illustrator	Raúl Colón	Me llamo Gabito: la vida de Gabriel García Márquez	Honor	
2008	Illustrator	Maya Christina Gonzalez	Mis colores, mi mundo	Honor	
2009	Author	Margarita Engle	The Surrender Tree: Poems of Cuba's Struggle for Freedom	Winner	
2009	Author	Yuyi Morales	Just In Case	Honor	
2009	Author	Francisco Jiménez	Reaching Out	Honor	
2009	Author	Lucía M. González	The Storyteller's Candle	Honor	
2009	Illustrator	Yuyi Morales	Just In Case	Winner	
2009	Illustrator	Rudy Gutierrez	Papá and Me	Honor	
2009	Illustrator	Lulu Delacre	The Storyteller's Candle	Honor	
2009	Illustrator	Amy Córdova	What Can You Do With a Rebozo?	Honor	
2010	Author	Julia Alvarez	Return to Sender	Winner	
2010	Author	Carmen T. Bernier-Grand	Diego: Bigger Than Life	Honor	
2010	Author	Georgina Lazaro	Federico García Lorca	Honor	
2010	Illustrator	Rafael López	Book Fiesta!: Celebrate Children's Day/Book Day; Celebremos El día de los niños/El día de los libros	Winner	
2010	Illustrator	David Diaz	Diego: Bigger Than Life	Honor	
2010	Illustrator	Yuyi Morales	My Abuelita	Honor	
2010	Illustrator	John Parra	Gracias • Thanks	Honor	
2011	Author	Pam Muñoz Ryan	The Dreamer	Winner	
2011	Author	Margarita Engle	The Firefly Letters: A Suffragette's Journey to Cuba	Honor	
2011	Author	Enrique Flores-Galbis	90 Miles to Havana	Honor	
2011	Author	George Ancona	¡Ole! Flamenco	Honor	
2011	Illustrator	Eric Velasquez	Grandma's Gift	Winner	
2011	Illustrator	Amy Córdova	Fiesta Babies	Honor	
2011	Illustrator	David Diaz	Me, Frida	Honor	
2011	Illustrator	Duncan Tonatiuh	Dear Primo: A Letter to My Cousin	Honor	
2012	Author	Guadalupe Garcia McCall	Under the Mesquite	Winner	
2012	Author	Margarita Engle	Hurricane Dancers: The First Caribbean Pirate Shipwreck	Honor	
2012	Author	Xavier Garza	Maximilian and the Mystery of the Guardian Angel: A Bilingual Lucha Libre Thriller	Honor	
2012	Illustrator	Duncan Tonatiuh	Diego Rivera: His World and Ours	Winner	
2012	Illustrator	Rafael López	The Cazuela that the Farm Maiden Stirred	Honor	
2012	Illustrator	Sara Palacios	Marisol McDonald Doesn't Match / Marisol McDonald no combina	Honor	
2013	Author	Benjamin Alire Sáenz	Aristotle and Dante Discover the Secrets of the Universe	Winner	
2013	Author	Sonia Manzano	The Revolution of Evelyn Serrano	Honor	
2013	Illustrator	David Diaz	Martín de Porres: The Rose in the Desert	Winner	
2014	Author	Meg Medina	Yaqui Delgado Wants to Kick Your Ass	Winner	
2014	Author	Margarita Engle	The Lightning Dreamer: Cuba's Greatest Abolitionist	Honor	
2014	Author	Matt de la Peña	The Living	Honor	
2014	Author	Duncan Tonatiuh	Pancho Rabbit and the Coyote: A Migrant's Tale	Honor	
2014	Illustrator	Yuyi Morales	Niño Wrestles the World	Winner	
2014	Illustrator	Angela Dominguez	Maria Had a Little Llama/María Tenía una Llamita	Honor	
2014	Illustrator	Rafael López	Tito Puente: Mambo King/Rey del Mambo	Honor	
2014	Illustrator	Duncan Tonatiuh	Pancho Rabbit and the Coyote: A Migrant's Tale	Honor	
2015	Author	Marjorie Agosín	I Lived on Butterfly Hill	Winner	
2015	Author	Juan Felipe Herrera	Portraits of Hispanic American Heroes	Honor	
2015	Illustrator	Yuyi Morales	Viva Frida	Winner	
2015	Illustrator	John Parra	Green Is a Chile Pepper	Honor	
2015	Illustrator	Susan Guevara	Little Roja Riding Hood	Honor	
2015	Illustrator	Duncan Tonatiuh	Separate Is Never Equal: Sylvia Mendez & Her Family's Fight for Desegregation	Honor	
2016	Author	Margarita Engle	Enchanted Air: Two Cultures, Two Wings: A Memoir	Winner	
2016	Author	David Bowles	The Smoking Mirror	Honor	
2016	Author	Meg Medina	Mango, Abuela, and Me	Honor	
2016	Illustrator	Rafael López	The Drum Dream Girl	Winner	
2016	Illustrator	Antonio Castro	My Tata's Remedies; Los remedios de mi tata	Honor	
2016	Illustrator	Angela Dominguez	Mango, Abuela, and Me	Honor	
2016	Illustrator	Duncan Tonatiuh	Funny Bones: Posada and His Day of the Dead Calaveras	Honor	
2017	Author	Juana Medina	Juana & Lucas	Winner	
2017	Author	Alexandra Diaz	The Only Road	Honor	
2017	Illustrator	Raúl Gonzalez	Lowriders to the Center of the Earth	Winner	
2017	Illustrator	Duncan Tonatiuh	Esquivel!: Space-Age Sound Artist	Honor	
2017	Illustrator	Duncan Tonatiuh	The Princess and the Warrior: A Tale of Two Volcanoes	Honor	
2018	Author	Ruth Behar	Lucky Broken Girl	Winner	
2018	Author	Celia C. Perez	The First Rule of Punk	Honor	
2018	Author	Pablo Cartaya	The Epic Fail of Arturo Zamora	Honor	
2018	Illustrator	Juana Martinez-Neal	La Princesa and the Pea	Winner	
2018	Illustrator	Adriana M. Garcia	All Around Us	Honor	
2018	Illustrator	John Parra	Frida Kahlo And Her Animalitos	Honor	
2019	Author	Elizabeth Acevedo	The Poet X	Winner	
2019	Author	David Bowles	They Call Me Güero	Honor	
2019	Illustrator	Yuyi Morales	Dreamers / Soñadores	Winner	
2019	Illustrator	José Ramírez	When Angels Sing	Honor	
2019	Illustrator	Leo Espinosa	Islandborn	Honor	
2020	Author	Carlos Hernandez	Sal and Gabi Break the Universe	Winner	
2020	Author	Rebecca Balcárcel	The Other Half of Happy	Honor	
2020	Author	Angela Cervantes	Lety Out Loud	Honor	
2020	Author	Anika Aldamuy Denise	Planting Stories: The Life of Librarian and Storyteller Pura Belpré	Honor	
2020	Author	Duncan Tonatiuh	Soldier for Equality: José de la Luz Sáenz and the Great War	Honor	
2020	Illustrator	Rafael López	Dancing Hands: How Teresa Carreño Played the Piano for President Lincoln	Winner	
2020	Illustrator	Carlos Aponte	Across the Bay	Honor	
2020	Illustrator	Raúl Gonzalez	¡Vamos! Let's Go to the Market	Honor	
2020	Illustrator	Zeke Peña	My Papi Has a Motorcycle	Honor	
2021	Children's Author	Ernesto Cisneros	Efrén Divided	Winner	
2021	Children's Author	Adrianna Cuevas	The Total Eclipse of Nestor Lopez	Honor	
2021	Children's Author	Donna Barba Higuera	Lupe Wong Won't Dance	Honor	
2021	Illustrator	Raúl Gonzalez	¡Vamos! Let's Go Eat	Winner	
2021	Illustrator	Elisa Chavarri	Sharuko: El Arqueólogo Peruano/Peruvian Archaeologist Julio C. Tello	Honor	
2021	Young Adult Author	Yamile Saied Méndez	Furia	Winner	
2021	Young Adult Author	Lilliam Rivera	Never Look Back	Honor	
2021	Young Adult Author	Jenny Torres Sanchez	We Are Not from Here	Honor	
2022	Children's Author	Donna Barba Higuera	The Last Cuentista	Winner	
2022	Children's Author	Alda P. Dobbs	Barefoot Dreams of Petra Luna	Honor	
2022	Children's Author	Gloria Amescua	Child of the Flower-Song People: Luz Jiménez, Daughter of the Nahua	Honor	
2022	Children's Author	Nomar Perez	De aquí como el coquí	Honor	
2022	Illustrator	Raúl Gonzalez	¡Vamos! Let's Cross the Bridge	Winner	
2022	Illustrator	C. G. Esperanza	Boogie Boogie, Y’all	Honor	
2022	Illustrator	Loris Lora	May Your Life Be Deliciosa	Honor	
2022	Illustrator	Yuyi Morales	Bright Star	Honor	
2022	Illustrator	Nomar Perez	De aquí como el coquí	Honor	
2022	Young Adult Author	Raquel Vasquez Gilliland	How Moon Fuentez Fell in Love with the Universe	Winner	
2022	Young Adult Author	Jonny Garza Villa	Fifteen Hundred Miles from the Sun	Honor	
2022	Young Adult Author	Laekan Zea Kemp	Somewhere Between Bitter and Sweet	Honor	
2022	Young Adult Author	Marcia Argueta Mickelson	Where I Belong	Honor	
2023	Children's Author	Claribel A. Ortega	Frizzy	Winner	
2023	Children's Author	Karina Nicole González	The Coquíes Still Sing	Honor	
2023	Children's Author	Stephen Briseño	The Notebook Keeper: A Story of Kindness from the Border	Honor	
2023	Children's Author	Celia C. Pérez	Tumble	Honor	
2023	Illustrator	Adriana M. Garcia	Where Wonder Grows	Winner	
2023	Illustrator	Krystal Quiles	The Coquíes Still Sing	Honor	
2023	Illustrator	Duncan Tonatiuh	A Land of Books: Dreams of Young Mexihcah Word Painters	Honor	
2023	Illustrator	Mirelle Ortega	Magic: Once Upon a Faraway Land	Honor	
2023	Illustrator	Loris Lora	Phenomenal AOC: The Roots and Rise of Alexandria Ocasio-Cortez	Honor	
2023	Illustrator	Kat Fajardo	Srta. Quinces	Honor	
2023	Illustrator	Magdalena Mora	Still Dreaming/Seguimos soñando	Honor	
2023	Young Adult Author	Vincent Tirado	Burn Down, Rise Up	Winner	
2023	Young Adult Author	Natalia Sylvester	Breathe and Count Back from Ten	Honor	
2023	Young Adult Author	Camille Gomera-Tavarez	High Spirits	Honor	
2023	Young Adult Author	Sonora Reyes	The Lesbiana's Guide to Catholic School	Honor	
2024	Children's Author	Pedro Martín	Mexikid: A Graphic Memoir	Winner	
2024	Children's Author	Donna Barba Higuera	Alebrijes	Honor	
2024	Children's Author	Jasminne Mendez	Aniana del Mar Jumps In	Honor	
2024	Children's Author	Mariana Llanos	Benita y las Criaturas Nocturnas	Honor	
2024	Children's Author	Jesús Trejo	Papá's Magical Water-Jug Clock	Honor	
2024	Children's Author	Andrea Beatriz Arango	Something Like Home	Honor	
2024	Illustrator	Pedro Martín	Mexikid: A Graphic Memoir	Winner	
2024	Illustrator	José B. Ramírez	Mi papá es un agrícola/My Father, the Farmworker	Honor	
2024	Illustrator	Eliza Kinkz	Papá's Magical Water-Jug Clock	Honor	
2024	Illustrator	Adriana M. Garcia	Remembering	Honor	
2024	Young Adult Author	Ari Tison	Saints of the Household	Winner	
2024	Young Adult Author	David Bowles	The Prince and the Coyote	Honor	
2024	Young Adult Author	Edel Rodriguez	Worm: A Cuban American Odyssey	Honor	
2025	Children's Author	Karla Arenas Valenti	Lola	Winner	
2025	Children's Author	Ashley Granillo	Cruzita and the Mariacheros	Honor	
2025	Children's Author	Aida Salazar	Ultraviolet	Honor	
2025	Illustrator	Marcelo Verdad	The Dream Catcher	Winner	
2025	Illustrator	Tatiana Gardel	Abuelo, the Sea, and Me	Honor	
2025	Illustrator	Juana Medina	A Maleta Full of Treasures	Honor	
2025	Young Adult Author	Carolina Ixta	Shut Up, This Is Serious	Winner	
2025	Young Adult Author	Bessie Flores Zaldívar	Libertad	Honor	
2025	Young Adult Author	Margarita Engle	Wild Dreamers	Honor	
2026	Children's Author	Lupe Ruiz-Flores	The Pecan Sheller	Winner	42
2026	Children's Author	Pablo Cartaya	A Hero’s Guide to Summer Vacation	Honor	
2026	Children's Author	Victor Piñeiro	The Island of Forgotten Gods	Honor	
2026	Children's Author	María Dolores Águila	A Sea of Lemon Trees: The Corrido of Roberto Alvarez	Honor	
2026	Illustrator	Abraham Matias	Popo the Xolo	Winner	
2026	Illustrator	Emmanuel Valtierra	A-Ztec: A Bilingual Alphabet Book	Honor	
2026	Illustrator	John Picacio	The Invisible Parade	Honor	
2026	Young Adult Author	Vanessa L. Torres	On the Wings of la Noche	Winner	
2026	Young Adult Author	Hailey Alcaraz	Rosa by Any Other Name	Honor	
2026	Young Adult Author	Pablo Leon	Silenced Voices: Reclaiming Memories from the Guatemalan Genocide	Honor	
2026	Young Adult Author	Jasminne Mendez	The Story of My Anger	Honor	

== Recipients of multiple medals and honors ==
George Ancona, Yuyi Morales, and Duncan Tonatiuh have received medals or honors for their roles as both author and illustrator. Duncan Tonatiuh is the only person to receive multiple awards in one year for two different works.

=== Belpré Medals ===
One person has won six Belpré Medals:

- Yuyi Morales, as illustrator 2004, 2008, 2009, 2014, 2015, 2019

Three people have won three Belpré Medals:

- Margarita Engle, as author 2008, 2009, 2016
- Rafael López as illustrator 2010, 2016, 2020
- Raúl Gonzalez, as illustrator 2017, 2021, 2022

Multiple people have won two Belpré Medals: Julia Alvarez as author, Susan Guevara as illustrator, and Pam Muñoz Ryan as author.

=== Belpré Honors ===
One person has won eight Belpré Honors:

- Duncan Tonatiuh, as illustrator 2011, 2014, 2015, 2016, and twice in 2017; as author 2014 and 2020

Three people won four Belpré Honors:

- David Diaz, as illustrator 2004, 2006, 2010, 2011
- Margarita Engle, as author 2011, 2012, 2014, 2025
- Yuyi Morales, as illustrator 2004, 2010; 2022; as author 2009

Multiple people have won three Belpré Honors:

- Francisco X. Alarcón, as author 1998, 2000, 2002
- George Ancona, as illustrator 1996, 2000; as author 2011
- Carmen T. Bernier-Grand, as author 2006, 2008, 2010
- Lulu Delacre, as illustrator 1996, 2006, 2009
- Rafael López, as illustrator 2006, 2012, 2014
- John Parra, as illustrator 2010, 2015, 2018
- David Bowles, as author, 2016, 2019, 2024

Multiple people have won two Belpré Honors. As illustrator: Amy Córdova, Angela Dominguez, and Carmen Lomas Garza. As author: Juan Felipe Herrera, and Francisco Jiménez as author.

=== Medal and Honor ===
Several authors have received both a Belpré Medal and a Belpré Honor: Raúl Colón, David Diaz, Margarita Engle, Carmen Lomas Garza, Susan Guevara, Rafael López, Meg Medina, Yuyi Morales, Pam Muñoz Ryan, and Duncan Tonatiuh.

==== Works with multiple awards ====
- Diego: Bigger than Life was the subject of two honors for author and illustrator in 2010.
- The Storyteller's Candle was the subject of two honors for author and illustrator in 2009.
- Just In Case was the subject of a medal for illustrator and an honor for author in 2009.
- Los Gatos Black on Halloween was the subject of a medal for illustrator and an honor for author in 2008
- Doña Flor: A Tall Tale About a Giant Woman with a Great Big Heart was the subject of a medal for illustrator and an honor for author in 2006.
- César: ¡Sí, Se Puede! Yes, We Can! was the subject of two honors for author and illustrator in 2006.
- 'El Gallo de Bodas: A Traditional Cuban Folktale was the subject of two honors for author and illustrator in 1996.
