= Adriana Garcia =

Adriana Garcia may refer to:

- Adriana García (born 1982), Ecuadorian politician
- Adriana García Roel (1916–2003), Mexican novelist
- Adriana M. Garcia, American artist
