= David Díaz (illustrator) =

American children's illustrator

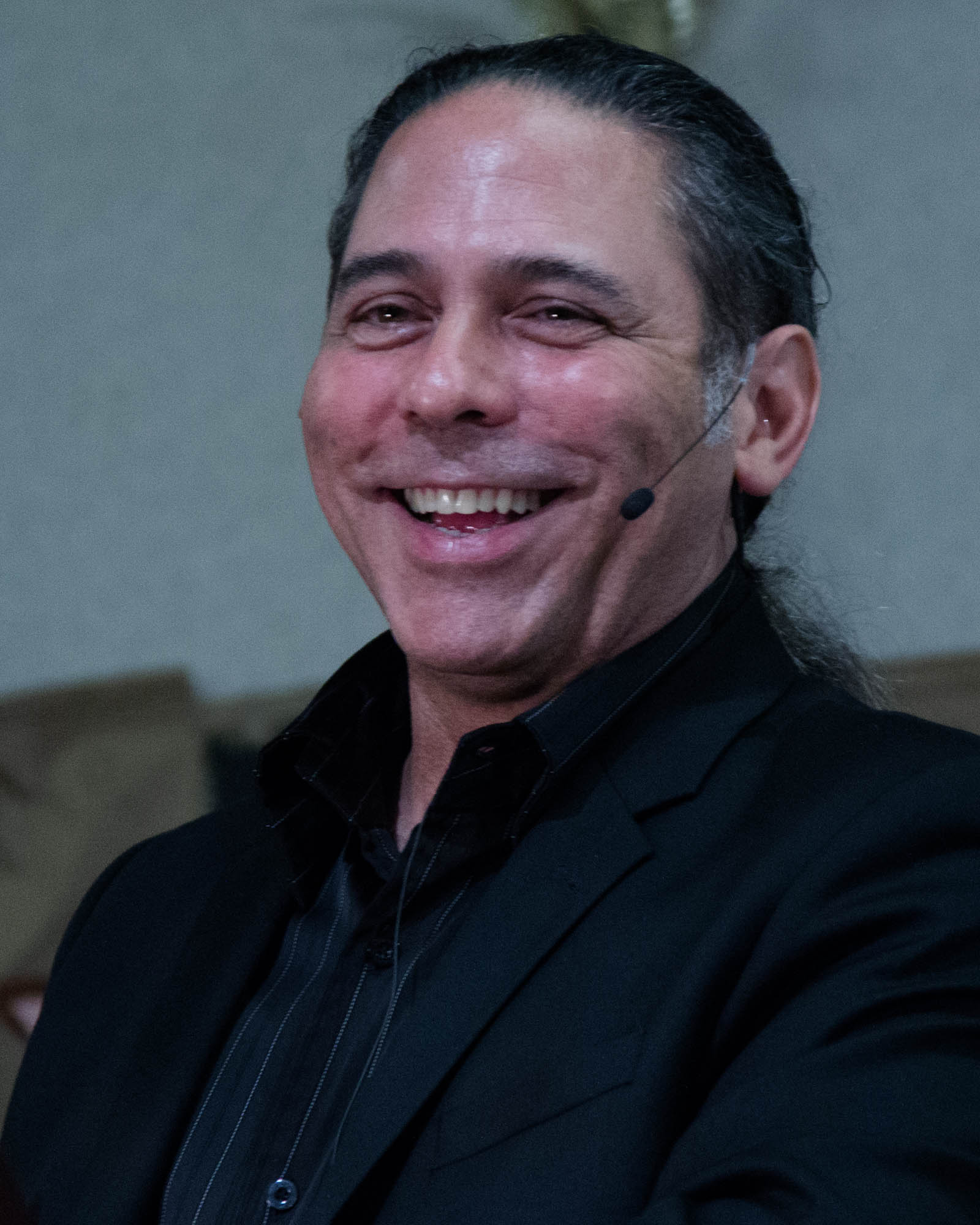
- Díaz at the Mazza Museum 2012 conference
- Born: 1960 (age 65–66); Fort Lauderdale, Florida
- Education: Fort Lauderdale Art Institute
- Occupations: Illustrator, graphic designer
- Writing career
- Period: 1992–present
- Genre: Children's picture books
- Notable work: Smoky Night
- Notable awards: Caldecott Medal; 1995

David Díaz (born 1960) is an American illustrator of children's books. He won the 1995 Caldecott Medal for U.S. picture book illustration recognizing Smoky Night by Eve Bunting. He currently lives in Carlsbad, California.

== Biography ==
David Díaz grew up in southern Florida with his family. He discovered his love for drawing when he was in the first grade while working on a vowel worksheet. His parents were concerned about his love for art because they did not want him to struggle with the uncertainty of being an artist. When David was only sixteen his mother died, which left a huge hole in his heart. From this tragedy, he used drawing as a catharsis for his emotional output. In high school, Díaz had an inspiring teacher that helped nurture his potential, this same teacher also lead him to competitions where he won awards for his art. When he got older, Díaz moved to southern California where he became a graphic design artist until he made his own design and illustration business called Diaz Icon. In 2018, a book Diaz had illustrated was pulled before its publication following allegations of sexual harassment at a Society of Children's Book Writers and Illustrators conference.

== Awards and exhibitions ==
=== Exhibitions ===
- 1997: "Going Home" art exhibit held by the National Center for Children's Illustrated Literature, Abilene, Texas
- July 8 – October 1, 2010: "Golden Kite, Golden Dream. Celebrating the Art of the Golden Kite Award" art exhibit to be hosted by the National Center for Children's Illustrated Literature, Abilene, Texas

=== Awards ===
- 1995 Caldecott Medal, Association for Library Service to Children (ALSC), American Library Association, Smoky Night by Eve Bunting
- 1995 School Library Journal Best Book of the Year, Smoky Night
- 2009 Parents' Choice Award, Ocean's Child

Runners-up

- 2004 Pura Belpré Award, ALSC, ALA, The Pot That Juan Built by Nancy Andrews-Goebel
- 2006 Pura Belpré Award, César: ¡Sí, Se Puede! Yes, We Can! by Carmen T. Bernier-Grand
- 2010 Pura Belpré Award, Diego: Bigger Than Life by Carmen T. Bernier-Grand

== Books illustrated ==
- Yes! We are Latinos by Alma Flor Ada and Isabel Campoy, Charlesbridge (2013)
- Martín de Porres: The Rose in the Desert by Gary Schmidt, Clarion (2012)
- Before You Came by Patricia MacLachlan & Emily MacLachlan Charest, HarperCollins (2011)
- Me, Frida by Amy Novesky, Harry N. Abrams Inc. (2010)
- Sharing the Seasons: A Book of Poems by Lee Bennett Hopkins, Simon & Schuster (2010)
- Let There Be Peace on Earth: And Let it Begin with Me by Jill Jackson and Sy Miller, Tricycle Press (2009)
- Ocean's Child by Christine Ford and Trish Holland, Golden Books (2009)
- Diego: Bigger Than Life by Carmen T. Bernier-Grand, Marshall Cavendish Corporation (2009)
- El Barrio by Deborah M. Newton Chocolate, Henry Holt & Company (2009)
- Build A Burrito by Denise Vega, Cartwheel Books (2008)
- De Colores: Bright With Colors, traditional folk song, Marshall Cavendish Corporation (2008)
- Castle Corona by Sharon Creech, HarperCollins (2007)
- Pocahontas: Princess of the New World by Kathleen Krull, Walker Books for Young Readers (2007)
- Counting Ovejas by Sarah Weeks, Atheneum (2006)
- Cesar: Si, Se Puede!/Yes, We Can! by Carmen Bernier-Grand, Marshall Cavendish Corporation (2006)
- Rin, Rin, Rin/Do, Re, Mi by José-Luis Orozco, Cartwheel Books (2005)
- Who's That Baby by Sharon Creech, HarperCollins (2005)
- Feliz Navidad: Two Stories Celebrating Christmas by José Feliciano, Cartwheel Books (2003)
- Angel Face by Sarah Weeks, Atheneum (2002)
- The Pot That Juan Built by Nancy Andrew-Goebel, Lee & Low Books (2002)
- Road Runner's Dance by Rudolfo A. Anaya, Disney Press (2000)
- Gospel Cinderella by Joyce Carol Thomas, HarperCollins (2000)
- Jump Rope Magic by Afi Scruggs and Afi-Odelia Scruggs, Scholastic (2000)
- The Wanderer by Sharon Creech, HarperCollins (1999)
- Shadow Story by Nancy Willard, HarperCollins (1999)
- The Little Scarecrow Boy by Margaret Wise Brown, HarperCollins (1999)
- Mother Goose Around the World: Big Book, Volume 4 by Lee Bennett Hopkins, William H. Sadlier, Inc. (1999)
- The Disappearing Alphabet by Richard Wilbur, Harcourt (1998)
- Be Not Far From Me by Eric A. Kimmel, Simon & Schuster (1998)
- December by Eve Bunting, Harcourt (1997)
- Wilma Unlimited: How Wilma Rudolph Became the World’s Fastest Woman by Kathleen Krull, Harcourt (1996)
- Passing Strange: True Tales of New England Hauntings and Horrors by Joseph Citro, Chapters Pub Ltd. (1996)
- The Inner City Mother Goose by Eve Merriam, Simon & Schuster (1996)
- Just One Flick of the Finger by Marybeth Lorbiecki, Dial (1996)
- Anansi's Narrow Waist by Len Cabral, Good Year Books (1994); translated as La Cintuita de Anansi (1995)
- Going Home by Eve Bunting, HarperCollins (1994)
- Smoky Night by Eve Bunting, Harcourt (1994)
- Neighborhood Odes by Gary Soto, Harcourt (1992)
