= Maya Christina Gonzalez =

Author, illustrator, educator and publisher

- Born: 1964 (age 61–62); Lancaster, California
- Known for: Children's book illustrations, Chicana artist

Maya Christina Gonzalez (born 1964) is a Chicana artist, illustrator, educator and publisher. She lives and works in San Francisco. Gonzalez is a co-founder of the publishing house Reflection Press. She also co-created an online learning environment called School of the Free Mind. Gonzalez has a unique, "high queer femme" sense of personal style that includes piercings and multiple tattoos. Gonzalez's art and work are focused on helping others build a sense of self and connection to others and the environment, despite differences between individuals. Her illustrations and books have helped increase "acceptance of, and love for, children's books by and about Latinos." Her art is featured on the cover of a textbook, Contemporary Chicana and Chicano Art: Artists, Works, Culture, and Education, Volume II. Gonzalez teaches and presents workshops around the United States.

== Biography ==
González was born in Lancaster, California into a biracial home: her mother was German and her father Mexican. Gonzalez has one brother, a year younger than her. When Gonzalez was seven, she had an accident which caused her to be in a coma for three days. After recovering, she found gifts waiting for her, including a pad of paper and colored pencils. This early gift inspired her to start drawing and introduced her to how art can help heal. In addition to art supplies, she was also taken to classes at a local craft store in order to help her recover fully. For several years, Gonzalez was "deeply catholic" and used the family Bible and Michelangelo as a drawing source and inspiration.

At age thirteen, Gonzalez and her family moved to rural Oregon where she experienced racism and homophobia. In Oregon, she was considered "exotic" and called a "mulatto." Gonzalez didn't intend to become an artist for a living and has little formal art training. She changed her mind about art after studying creative writing at the University of Oregon. While she enjoyed poetry, she found the departments culture to be very focused on white-male experiences and the language and topics used to be “exclusive and hierarchical.” Gonzalez decided that art was a more "inclusive and complicated" way for her to express herself. She was drawn to art because it was more accessible than writing and she could be less explicit with her imagery. This is when she began painting. Gonzalez was prompted to move from Oregon to San Francisco after she was shot at, while living in a lesbian wilderness community. She also found that she would be better able to pursue her artistic dreams in San Francisco where she still lives today. Gonzalez has become estranged from her parents who disowned her when she came out at age 20 as part of the LGBT community At that time she became very involved with the LGBTQIA+ community and the politics surrounding them.

After leaving school with only a few art classes taken, Gonzalez explored creating her own art. At this time, Gonzalez was interested in exploring the nature of "reality, consciousness and how these relate to creativity" and was very influenced by Jane Roberts' channeling of another consciousness that Roberts referred to as Seth. Harriet Rohmer, the original founder of Children's Book Press (now an imprint of Lee&Low Books), asked her if she would be interested in illustrating children's books, which is ultimately what lead Gonzalez to her passion for illustrating. Gonzalez said it felt as if she had “come home.”

In 1996, Gonzalez suffered from a toxic dose of chemicals in a print-making accident. The accident caused her to be incapacitated for three years and very sick for ten more. During her illness, she traveled out of the United States for the first time, going to India and visiting the city of Varanasi, which she considered a sacred place. She also went to Brazil to work with Ayauasca, a "plant teacher." Ayauasca identified Gonzalez's illness as heavy metal poisoning in 2003 and eventually began to receive treatment in various forms. After her health returned, Gonzalez began to create more art, and also received a grant from the San Francisco Arts Commission to create a series, Healing Through. The series was completed and shown in 2008–09, around the same time she wrote her first book, My Colors, My World.

González has two children and is married to Reflection Press co-founder, Matthew. Reflection Press focuses on children's book that are considered "radical and revolutionary." She says that "the freaks and geeks need to tell their stories and kids need to hear them and relate to them," and that major, established publishing houses won't publish those kinds of books. Of her family, Gonzalez says that her domestic life is such that the "dominant culture" would have "absolutely no ideas what to do with somebody like me...I'm in line with my beliefs and completely out of line with the beliefs of the dominant culture."

== Work ==
Gonzalez's art depicts non-stereotypical images of people, including overweight individuals and empowered women. She often includes a chimeric sense of nepantla in her art, depicting human-like figures who are not completely part of any category or world. Her portraits and self-portraits are "hybridized," redefining women using "elements drawn from Mexican history." Her figures are considered "sensuously curvaceous." Gonzalez's art also shows a connection of the individual to the environment. González was influenced by the work of Frida Kahlo, and reinterprets that artist's life through use of her image and artistic legacy. Gonzalez uses many different techniques to create her art, including "acrylics, collage, cut paper, photography, pastels and charcoal." Gonzalez feels that creating art is a spiritual process. Her work often draws from many sources of mythology, like the Aztecs, and traditional spiritual icons like the Virgin of Guadalupe. Other sources of inspiration include pop culture and her own imagination. Her paintings combine her inspirations to "work out impulses with culled, blended imagery." For some time after her illness, Gonzalez worked with a more limited pallet.

González was inspired to illustrate after meeting Harriet Rohmer, the founder of Children's Book Press. She has illustrated over twenty books and written some on her own. Gonzalez considers it very important as a child to see oneself depicted in books. Gonzalez wants children to know that they belong by using her illustrations to create inclusive books. She wants to illustrate difficult situations and feelings for children, so that they feel less "alone." Her illustrations for children include individuals who are not seen as often in books, such as gay characters and overweight characters. For illustrations in Francisco X. Alarcon's stories, Gonzalez had to fight to keep the image of an overweight boy who was meant to mirror Alarcon himself. Gonzalez also hides "secret" images in her illustrations. Gonzalez hid her first secret image in her illustrations for Laughing Tomatoes. Her first written and illustrated children's book was My Colors, My World.

Environmental concerns are important in Gonzalez's work. She has been praised for her raising awareness of the environment with young people. I Know the River Loves Me/Yo sé que el río me ama (2009), depicts a Chicana girl visiting a river. As she spends more time exploring, the sepia-tones of the illustrations give way to more and more color. The book was considered a "beautiful story." I Know the River Loves Me is about "belonging to the world" and having a "relationship with nature." Gonzalez feels that such relationships with the environment are "a very Chicano experience."

Call Me Tree: Llámame árbol, was described as "vibrantly hued" and a "good choice for story hour dramatizations." It is also significant in not using any gendered pronouns in the story. Call Me Tree was included in the "prestigious" list curated by Kirkus Reviews, "Best Children's Books of 2014." Her writing for Call Me Tree was also praised by Kirkus Reviews, saying that Gonzalez "excels at using few words to evoke grand imagery."

González also creates activity books, many of which go along with the curriculum of the School of the Free Mind. Her activity books cover topics that are not often discussed in schools or at home, such as understanding gender. The activity book Gender Now (2010) explores how there are "multiple levels of gender expression." It was also the first book for children to "explore transgender topics" and intersex topics.

== Bibliography ==
Books written and illustrated by González:

- Unfurling: Voice is a Revolution. San Francisco, California: Reflection Press. 28 February 2018. ISBN 9781945289019.
- The Gender Wheel. San Francisco, California: Reflection Press. 2018. ISBN 9781945289132.
- They She He Me: Free to Be!. San Francisco, California: Reflection Press. 2017. ISBN 978-1945289064.
- When a Bully is President. San Francisco, California: Reflection Press. 4 September 2017. ISBN 9781945289071.
- By the Light of the Rabbit Moon. San Francisco, California: Reflection Press. 19 June 2016. ISBN 9781945289002.
- Whaleheart. San Francisco, California: Reflection Press. August 2015. ISBN 978-0984379989.
- Call Me Tree. New York: Children's Book Press. 2014. ISBN 978-0892392940.
- i see peace. Reflection Press. 2012. ISBN 978-0984379941.
- Gender Now Activity Book: School Edition. San Francisco, California: Reflection Press. 2011.
- Gender Now Coloring Book: A Learning Adventure for Children and Adults. San Francisco, California: Reflection Press. 2010. ISBN 978-0984379910.
- Claiming Face: Self-Empowerment Through Self-Portraiture. San Francisco, California: Reflection Press. 2010. ISBN 978-0984379903.
- I know the River Loves Me. New York: Children's Book Press. 2009. ISBN 978-0892392360.
- My Colors, My World. New York: Children's Book Press. 2007. ISBN 978-0892392780.

Books illustrated by González:

- Alarcon, Francisco (2017). Family Poems for Everyday of the Week. New York: Children's Book Press. ISBN 9780892392759.
- Alarcon, Francisco (2008). Animal Poems of the Iguazu. New York: Children's Book Press. ISBN 978-0892392254.
- Perez, Amada Irma (2007). Nana's Big Surprise. New York: Children's Book Press. ISBN 978-0892391905.
- Goldberg, Dana (2007). On My Block: Stories and Paintings by Fifteen Artists. Children's Book Press. ISBN 978-0892392209.
- Perez, Amada Irma (2002). My Diary From Here to There. San Francisco, California: Children's Book Press. ISBN 978-0892391752.
- Alarcon, Francisco (2001). Iguanas in the Snow and Other Winter Poems. New York: Children's Book Press. ISBN 978-0892392025.
- Gerson, Mary-Joan (2001). Fiesta Femenina. Cambridge, Massachusetts: Barefoot Books. ISBN 978-1841483658.
- Perez, Amada Irma (2000). My Very Own Room. New York: Children's Book Press. ISBN 978-0892391646.
- Alarcon, Francisco (1999). Angels Ride Bikes and Other Fall Poems. New York: Children's Book Press. ISBN 978-0892391981.
- Rohmer, Harriet, ed. (1999). Honoring Our Ancestors: Stories and Portraits by 14 Artists. New York: Children's Book Press. ISBN 978-0892391585.
- Alarcon, Francisco (1998). From the Bellybutton of the Moon and other Summer Poems. New York: Children's Book Press. ISBN 978-0892391530.
- Alarcon, Francisco (1997). Laughing Tomatoes and Other Spring Poems. New York: Children's Book Press. ISBN 978-0892391394.
- Rohmer, Harriet, ed. (1997). Just Like Me: Stories and Self-Portraits by Fourteen Artists. New York: Children's Book Press. ISBN 978-0892391493.
- Anzaluda, Gloria E. (1996). Prietita and the Ghost Woman. New York: Children's Book Press. ISBN 978-0892391363.

== Awards ==
- 2009 Américas Book Award Commended Title (Animal Poems of the Iguazu).
- 2008 Pura Belpré Award Honor Book for Illustration (My Colors, My World).
- 2000 Tomas Rivera Mexican American Children's Book Award (My Very Own Room)
