= Lee & Low Books =

American children's book publisher

- Founded: 1991
- Founder: Philip Lee and Tom Low
- Country of origin: United States
- Headquarters location: New York City
- Distribution: self-distributed (US); Fitzhenry & Whiteside (Canada)
- Key people: Tom Low (President); Jason Low (Vice President, Publisher); Craig Low (Vice President, Publisher of Bebop Books)
- Publication types: Books, Games
- Imprints: Tu Books; Bebop Books; Children's Book Press; Shen's Books; Lee & Low Games; Dive Into Reading; Cinco Puntos Press
- Official website: www.leeandlow.com

Lee & Low Books is an independent children's book publisher focusing on diversity.

== History ==
Lee & Low was founded in 1991 by Chinese Americans Tom Low and Philip Lee as a children's book publisher specializing in books featuring people of color and one of the few minority-owned publishing companies in the United States. Low says, "There was a void in children's books. Most of the books were targeted to Caucasians or contained animals or fairy tales. There was nothing dealing with contemporary issues and people of color.". Lee & Low published its first list in 1993 and immediately gained attention when its first book, Baseball Saved Us was given a full-page review in The New York Times Book Review.

In 1997, founder Tom Low's sons, Jason Low and Craig Low, joined Lee & Low, and in 2004, founder Philip Lee retired.

Lee & Low Books publishes primarily picture books, but in recent years has also published a small number of middle grade and young adult titles.

In January 2012, Lee & Low Books acquired the backlist titles of the now-defunct non-profit publisher, Children's Book Press, as well as the latter's existing contracts with authors and illustrators, with the name itself being revived as an imprint of Lee & Low Books.

In 2021, Lee & Low acquired Cinco Puntos Press.

== Research ==
In 2015, Lee & Low Books partnered with St. Catherine University and Assistant Professor Sarah Park Dahlen to conduct the Diversity Baseline Survey (DBS). The objectives were to look at 1) Gender 2) Race/ethnicity 3) Sexual Orientation 4) Disability in the publishing industry.

The Diversity Baseline Survey (DBS) was sent to 1,524 reviewer employees and 11,713 publishing employees for a total of 13,237 surveys deployed. The DBS survey results confirmed that the publishing industry is overwhelmingly white, at 79%, which corresponded with the numbers from Publishers Weekly's annual salary survey.

== Arcoiris: books in Spanish ==
In 1994, Lee & Low began to publish Spanish/English bilingual books and Spanish translations of many of their English titles. The name Arcoiris, Spanish for rainbow, was chosen to reflect the diversity of the books and subject matter.

== Bebop Books ==
Founded in 2000, Bebop Books is an educational imprint of Lee & Low. Bebop Books prints leveled books for early readers in English and Spanish.

== Tu Books ==
Tu Books is an imprint of Lee & Low. Tu Books publishes middle grade and young adult science fiction, fantasy, and mystery featuring people of color or set in worlds inspired by non-Western folklore or culture.

Tu Books was founded as Tu Publishing in 2009 by Stacy Whitman, a freelance children's book editor. In March 2010, Whitman joined Lee & Low as editorial director of the new imprint.

== New Voices Award ==
In 2000, Lee & Low Books established the New Voices Award to encourage writers of color. The award is open to any United States resident of color who has not had a children's picture book published previously. A winner receives $1000 and a standard publication contract, while an Honor Award winner receives $500. While Honor Award winners are not guaranteed publication, several honor books have been published.

New Voices Award recipients

Year	Author	Book	Citation	Published
2010	Jane Bahk	Juna's Jar	Winner	2015
2010	Muon Van	Village by the Sea	Honor	
2009	Tiare Williams Solorzano	Little Fish	Honor	
2008	Hayan Charara	The Three Lucys	Honor	
2007	Pamela M. Tuck	A Fly in a Bowl of Milk	Winner	2012
2007	Katie Yamasaki	Edwin's Lucky Thirteen	Honor	
2006	Gloria Armand Sheppard	Love Twelve Miles Long	Winner	2011
2006	Janet Costa Bates	Seaside Dream	Honor	2010
2005	Don Tate	It Jes' Happened: When Bill Traylor Started to Draw	Honor	2012
2005	Zetta Elliott	Bird	Honor	2008
2004	Carmen Bogan	Fit Like Frankie	Honor	
2003	Paula Yoo	Sixteen Years in Sixteen Seconds: The Sammy Lee Story	Winner	2005
2003	Lisette Norman	My Feet are Laughing	Honor	2006 (Farrar, Straus and Giroux)
2002	Adrienne Lorraine Bayton	Dance, Nishi, Dance	Honor	
2001	Patricia Smith	Janna and the Kings	Winner	2003
2001	Denise Vega	Superhombre	Honor	
2000	Linda Boyden	The Blue Roses	Winner	2002
2000	Stanley Todd Terasaki	Ghosts for Breakfast	Honor	2002
2000	Therese On Louie	Raymond's Perfect Present	Honor	2002

== Major awards ==
Books published by Lee & Low have received several major awards, including some given by the American Library Association, the International Reading Association (IRA), and the New York Public Library.

Major awards won by Lee & Low Books

Award	Citation	Year	Creator	Book
Coretta Scott King Author Honor Award	Winner	2011	G. Neri	Yummy: the Last Days of a Southside Shorty
Coretta Scott King Author Award	Winner	1974	Sharon Bell Mathis	Ray Charles
Coretta Scott King Author Award	Honor	1976	Eloise Greenfield	Paul Robeson
Coretta Scott King Illustrator Award	Winner	1998	Javaka Steptoe	In Daddy's Arms I Am Tall: African Americans Celebrating Fathers
Coretta Scott King Illustrator Award	Winner	1974	George Ford (illustrator)	Ray Charles
Coretta Scott King Illustrator Award	Honor	1997	R. Gregory Christie	The Palm of my Heart: Poetry by African American Children
Coretta Scott King Illustrator Award	Honor	2006	R. Gregory Christie	Brothers in Hope: The Story of the Lost Boys of Sudan
Coretta Scott King/John Steptoe New Illustrator Award	Winner	2009	Shadra Strickland	Bird
Ezra Jack Keats New Illustrator Award	Winner	2009	Shadra Strickland	Bird
Ezra Jack Keats New Writer Award	Winner	1999	Stephanie Stuve-Bodeen	Elizabeti's Doll
Ezra Jack Keats New Writer Award	Winner	1999	Stephanie Stuve-Bodeen	Elizabeti's Doll
Ezra Jack Keats New Writer Award	Honor	2013	Don Tate	It Jes' Happened: When Bill Traylor Started to Draw
IRA Children's Book Award	Winner	2003	Nancy Andrews-Goebel	The Pot that Juan Built
IRA Children's Book Award	Notable	2006	Mary Williams	Brothers in Hope: The Story of the Lost Boys of Sudan
IRA Children's Book Award	Notable	2006	Paula Yoo	Sixteen Years in Sixteen Seconds: The Sammy Lee Story
IRA Children's Book Award	Notable	2005	EdNah New Rider Weber	Rattlesnake Mesa
IRA Children's Book Award	Notable	2005	Debbie A. Taylor	Sweet Music in Harlem
IRA Children's Book Award	Notable	2004	Patricia Smith	Janna and the Kings
Pura Belpré Illustrator Award	Honor	2010	John Parra	Gracias • Thanks
Pura Belpré Illustrator Award	Honor	2006	Lulu Delacre	Arrorró, mi niño: Latino Lullabies and Gentle Games
Pura Belpré Illustrator Award	Honor	2004	Robert Casilla	First Day in Grapes
Pura Belpré Illustrator Award	Honor	2004	David Diaz	The Pot that Juan Built

== Notable authors and illustrators ==
Authors and illustrators with work published by Lee & Low Books include:

- Lulu Delacre
- Ted Lewin
- Betsy Lewin
- Joseph Bruchac
- Ed Young
- Rosa Parks
- Carole Boston Weatherford
- Pat Mora
- David Diaz
- George Ancona
- John Coy
- Lynne Barasch
- Benny Andrews
- Jim Haskins
- Chris Soentpiet
- Greg Neri
- Kaylani Juanita

== See also ==
- Media of New York City
- List of publishers of children's books
