= Raúl the Third =

Mexican American artist and illustrator (born 1976)

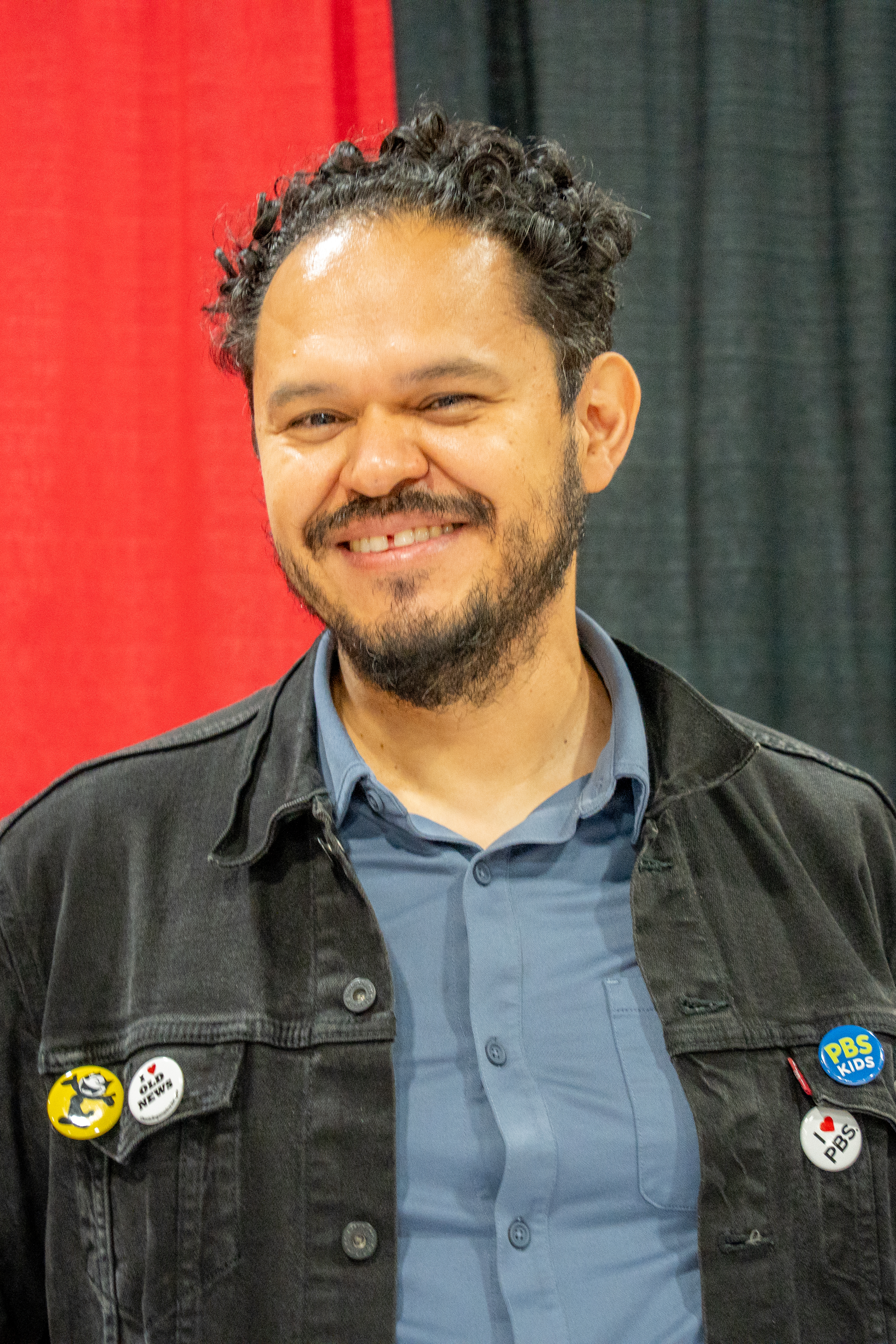
- González at the 2025 National Book Festival
- Born: Raúl González; November 29, 1976 (age 49); El Paso, Texas, United States
- Occupations: Artist, illustrator
- Writing career
- Notable works: Lowriders in Space; Lowriders to the Center of the Earth
- Notable awards: Pura Belpré Illustrator Award
- Website: www.raulthethird.com

Raúl the Third (born November 29, 1976) is a Mexican American artist and illustrator.

== Life and career ==
Raúl González was born in El Paso. His father was from that town while his mother was from the neighboring Mexican city of Juárez. Raúl spent his childhood in both cities. In addition to his extensive work as a painter (which has been exhibited in New York, Boston, and Los Angeles), Raúl is a comic book and graphic novel illustrator. He works on the SpongeBob SquarePants comic, among other titles.

In 2019, Kwame Alexander's imprint Versify (part of Houghton Mifflin Harcourt) launched a series of bilingual children's books written and illustrated by Raúl.

Raúl resides with his wife and son in Medford, Massachusetts.

== Awards and honors ==
- Bank Street Children's Book Committee's Best Book of the Year in 2022 for Stuntboy, in the Meantime, authored by Jason Reynolds.
- Bank Street Children's Book Committee's Best Book of the Year in 2022 for Tag Team (El Toro & Friends series).
- Pura Belpré Illustrator Winner in 2021 for ¡Vamos! Let’s Go Eat.
- Bank Street Children's Book Committee's Best Book of the Year in 2021 for ¡Vamos! Let’s Go Eat.
- Pura Belpré Illustrator Honor in 2020 for ¡Vamos! Let’s Go to the Market.
- Bank Street Children's Book Committee's Best Book of the Year in 2021 for ¡Vamos! Let’s Go to the Market.
- Pura Belpré Illustrator Winner in 2017 for Lowriders to the Center of the Earth.
- Texas BlueBonnet award nomination in 2016-2017 for Lowriders in Space.
- The Brother Thomas Fellowship in 2015.
- Voted Boston's best visual artist for 2010 by readers of The Boston Phoenix.
- Artadia Foundation for Art and Culture award in 2009.

== Works ==
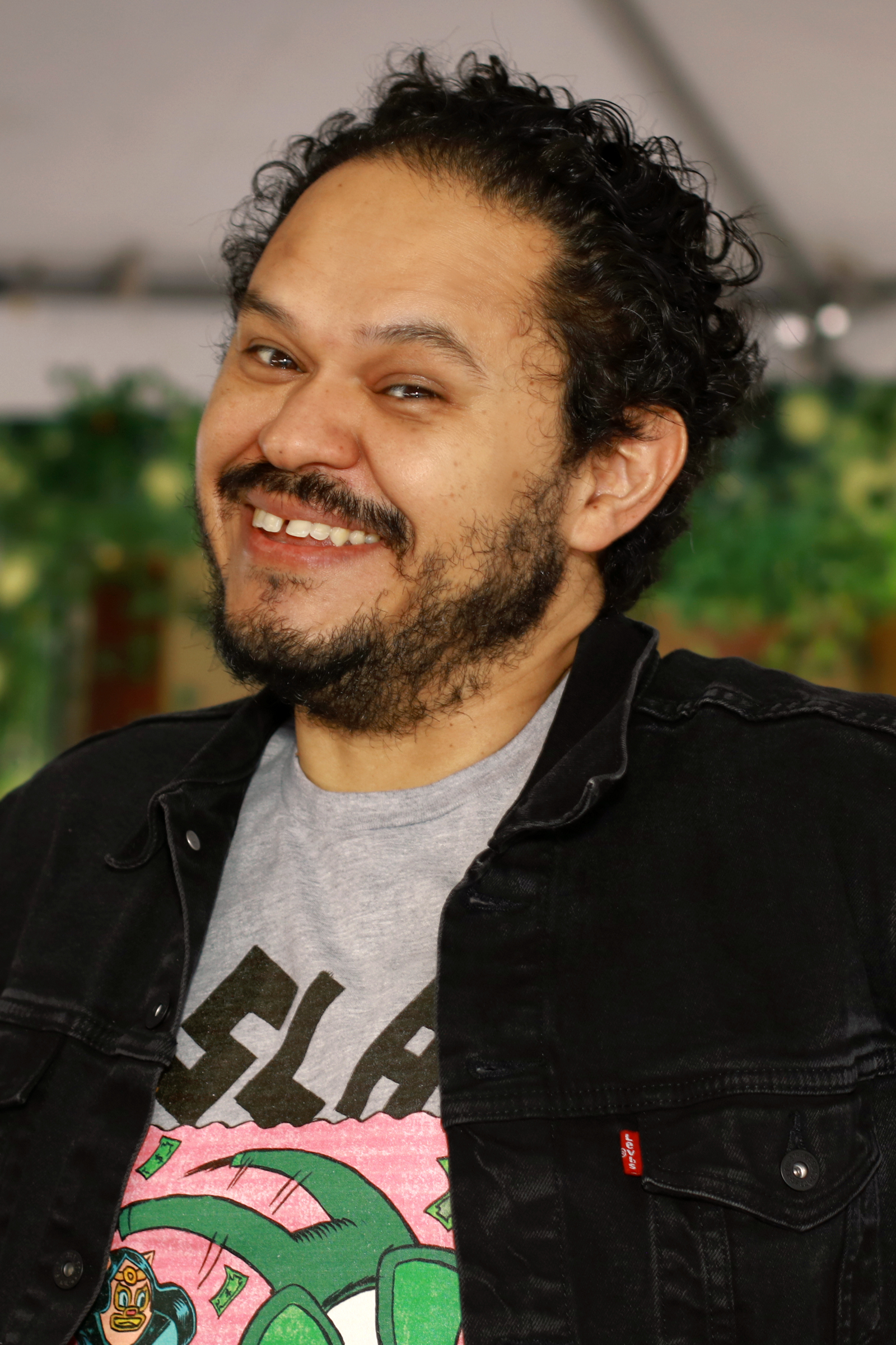
González at the 2024 Texas Book Festival

=== Illustrator ===
- Stuntboy, in the Meantime. Written by Jason Reynolds. New York, NY: Atheneum/Caitlyn Dlouhy Books, 2021.
- Clockwork Curandera, Vol. 1: The Witch Owl Parliament. Written by David Bowles. New York, NY: Tu Books, 2021.
- Lowriders: Blast from the Past. Written by Cathy Camper. San Francisco: Chronicle Books, 2018.
- Lowriders to the Center of the Earth. Written by Cathy Camper. San Francisco: Chronicle Books, 2016.
- Lowriders in Space. Written by Cathy Camper. San Francisco: Chronicle Books, 2014.

=== Author and illustrator (with colors by Elaine Bey) ===
- ¡Vamos! Let's Celebrate Halloween and Día de los Muertos. New York: Versify (Houghton Mifflin Harcourt), 2024.
- ¡Vamos! Let's Go Read. New York: Versify (Houghton Mifflin Harcourt), 2023.
- Team Up. New York: Versify (Houghton Mifflin Harcourt), 2022.
- ¡Vamos! Let's Cross the Bridge. New York: Versify (Houghton Mifflin Harcourt), 2021.
- Training Day. New York: Versify (Houghton Mifflin Harcourt), 2021.
- Tag Team. New York: Versify (Houghton Mifflin Harcourt), 2021.
- ¡Vamos! Let’s Go Eat. New York: Versify (Houghton Mifflin Harcourt), 2020.
- ¡Vamos! Let’s Go to the Market. New York: Versify (Houghton Mifflin Harcourt), 2019.

== Sources ==
- Trujillo, Robert (February 9, 2015). "Q & A with Illustrator Raúl the Third". Latinxs in Kids Lit. Archived from the original on February 17, 2015.
- American Library Association (January 30, 2017). "American Library Association announces 2017 youth media award winners". American Library Association.
- González, Raúl. "About Raúl the Third". Art by Raúl. Raúl González.
- Laughran, Jennifer. "Clients". a.k.a literaticat. Jennifer Laughran.
- Ortega, Dave (July 19, 2018). "Lowriders". PEN America. PEN America.
- Zielinski, Sara (August 27, 2015). "Interview With Raul Gonzalez III". Huffington Post.
- Eskey, Nicholas (22 March 2018). "Nothing but Bic Pens Will Do for Latino Artist Raul the Third". The Beat.
- Tuttle, Kate (July 1, 2016). "Raúl Gonzalez: learning his art at 7-11". The Boston Globe. The Boston Globe.
- Maughan, Shannon (July 24, 2018). "Spring 2019 Children's Sneak Previews". Publishers Weekly. Publishers Weekly.
- Alter, Alexandra (January 30, 2018). "Kwame Alexander Will Start His Own Imprint. The Name? Versify. Get It?". Books News. New York Times.
