= Axie Oh =

American author

- Born: October 27 New York City, U.S.
- Occupation: Novelist; author
- Education: University of California San Diego; Lesley University (MFA)
- Genre: Fantasy, young adult fiction

Website
- axieoh.com

Axie Oh (born October 27) is a first-generation Korean American author based in Las Vegas, Nevada. She is the New York Times bestselling author of The Girl Who Fell Beneath the Sea, XOXO, and The Floating World duology.

== Early life and education ==
Oh's mother immigrated to the United States as a teenager. Oh was born in New York City and grew up in New Jersey.

She graduated from the University of California San Diego where she studied East Asian history and literature, and obtained a MFA from Lesley University in Writing for Young People.

== Career ==
Oh didn't start writing her first novel until she graduated, and submitted her second novel Rebel Seoul (originally titled The Amaterasu Project) to the New Visions Award, where she won and got it published. She revealed of drawing on her Korean cultural background with K-dramas and K-pop music to create the book's universe. Its sequel, Rogue Heart, was released in 2019.

Her third novel, XOXO, was published by HarperTeen in 2021.

Her fourth novel, The Girl Who Fell Beneath the Sea, was published by Feiwel & Friends in 2022. It is a retelling of the Korean classic folktale, "The Tale of Sim Ch'ŏng".

== Bibliography ==
=== The Floating World ===
- The Floating World (2024)
- The Demon and the Light (2025)

=== XOXO ===
- XOXO (2021)
- ASAP (2024)

=== Rebel Seoul ===
- Rebel Seoul (2017)
- Rogue Heart (2019)

=== Standalone ===
- The Girl Who Fell Beneath the Sea (2022)

== Awards ==
- 2014: Her novel Rebel Seoul won the New Visions Award
- 2022: Her novel The Girl Who Fell Beneath the Sea was a Cybils Award finalist.
- 2026: Her novel The Girl Who Fell Beneath the Sea was a Lincoln Award nominee.
