= National Center for Children's Illustrated Literature =

American museum

Coordinates: 32.449836°N 99.735759°W

The National Center for Children's Illustrated Literature (NCCIL, pronounced nickle) is an American museum dedicated to illustrations in children's literature. It was established in 2000 and is located in Abilene, Texas.

== Overview ==
The center was established to produce exhibitions of artwork. Following its debut at the NCCIL gallery each exhibition travels to museums, public libraries, and galleries nationwide. The NCCIL hosts summer art camps and has an extensive docent-led school tour program.

NCCIL was begun through the effort of former Mayor Gary D. McCaleb, an administrator at Abilene Christian University. In December 1993, former Abilene mayor Dr. Gary McCaleb was invited to a local elementary school to read William Joyce's Santa Calls. Inspired to learn that Joyce had set his story in Abilene, Dr. McCaleb invited Joyce to speak at a Cultural Affairs Council luncheon and when the two men met, they formed an immediate friendship. From this meeting a concept originated of a place that would honor the artwork of children's illustrators. In March 1997, the National Center for Children's Illustrated Literature was incorporated as a non-profit organization, and a statue depicting the children from Santa Calls, "Childhood's Great Adventure" by Rick Jackson, was erected downtown. The Junior League of Abilene became the major sponsor and on September 14, 2000, the renovated Rhodes Building, circa 1920s, was opened to the public.

== Past exhibitors ==
- Wayne Anderson
- Mary Azarian
- Mike Berenstain
- Ashley Bryan
- Bryan Collier
- Donald Crews
- Nina Crews
- Étienne Delessert
- David Diaz
- Leo & Diane Dillon
- Denise Fleming
- Willi Glasauer
- Golden Books
- Golden Kite
- Kevin Henkes
- Roberto Innocenti
- Ann Jonas
- William Joyce (writer)
- Deborah Nourse Lattimore
- Betsy Lewin
- Ted Lewin
- David Macaulay
- Gerald McDermott
- Wendell Minor
- Brian Pinkney
- Jerry Pinkney
- Chris Raschka
- Matthew Reinhart
- Robert Sabuda
- Peter Sís
- David Small
- Brian Selznick
- Diane Stanley
- William Steig
- David Wiesner
- Mo Willems
- Mike Wimmer
- Ed Young
- Paul O. Zelinsky
