= Smoky Night =

1994 picture book by Eve Bunting

- Author: Eve Bunting
- Illustrator: David Diaz
- Genre: Children's picture book Modern Realistic Fiction
- Publisher: Harcourt Brace
- Publication date: 1994
- Publication place: United States
- Pages: 40
- ISBN: 978-0-15-269954-3
- OCLC: 28294012
- Dewey Decimal: [E] 20
- LC Class: PZ7.B91527 Sl 1994

Smoky Night is a 1994 children's book by Eve Bunting. It tells the story of a Los Angeles riot and its aftermath through the eyes of a young boy named Daniel. The ongoing fires and looting force neighbors who previously disliked each other to work together to find their cats. In the end, the cats teach their masters how to get along. The book made the list of One Hundred Books that Shaped the Century compiled by the Staff at the School Library Journal. They added the book to the list as paving the way towards the genre of serious picture books. David Diaz's acrylic, collage-like illustration of the tale earned the book the 1995 Caldecott Medal.

== Summary ==
Riots and commotion are happening around Los Angeles, where Daniel and his mother live. The family is forced to leave their apartment when the building catches fire. After all the racism and judgement happening and not getting along with their neighbor, they must come together and put their differences aside. In the upheaval, their cat and a neighbor's cat are lost. Once they get to the shelter where they were staying at, a fireman brings their cats, who have bonded over their experience.

== Illustrations ==
Smoky Night is illustrated by David Diaz. The paintings in this book were done in acrylics on Arches watercolor paper. The backgrounds were composed and photographed by the illustrator. The title was hand-lettered by the illustrator.

== Awards ==
Awards for Smoky Night
Year	Award	Result	Ref.
1994	CCBC Choices	Winner	
1994	Commonwealth Club of California Book Awards: Juvenile	Winner	
1995	AISLE Read-Aloud Books Too Good To Miss	Winner	
1995	Randolph Caldecott Medal	Winner	
1996	Texas Bluebonnet Award	Nominee	

Awards
Preceded by Grandfather's Journey	Caldecott Medal recipient 1995	Succeeded by Officer Buckle and Gloria
