= Click Here (To Find Out How I Survived Seventh Grade) =

2005 novel by Denise Vega

- Author: Denise Vega
- Language: English
- Genre: Fiction
- Publisher: Little, Brown Book Group
- Publication date: April 1, 2005
- Pages: 224
- ISBN: 978-0316985604

Click Here (To Find How I Survived Seventh Grade) is author Denise Vega's debut novel.

== Plot ==
Erin Swift is a seventh grader with big feet who keeps a private website, on which she writes all her feelings and what's happening in her life. Erin and her best friend, Jilly, were about to attend a middle school by the name of Molly Brown. Unfortunately, they are separated by tracks. Erin is on A track, while Jilly is on C track.

At first, Erin wants to be with Jilly more than anything, but when she met "Cute Boy", a.k.a. Mark Sacks, she changes her mind. On her first day, she receives three days of detention because she punches a childhood enemy, Serena, on the nose for calling Jilly her master puppeteer. Her elder brother, Chris, becomes annoyed over the incident, because he loves Serena's older sister. After the "puppet incident", Jilly signs herself and Erin up for the Thanksgiving Day play. Jilly gets the role of Goody Stanton, the main character, while Erin receives the part of an Ear of Corn, a moment of great annoyance and anger for her. Erin also signed up for the school Intranet Club (the school's Internet) without Jilly, which is very significant because it's the first time she breaks away from her friend's hold and does anything on her own. There, she meets Tyler, whom her new friend Rosie said had been crushing on Erin.

Meanwhile, Erin tries not to let Mark meet Jilly and vice versa, because she knows if they meet each other, they'll fall in teenage love, effectively ruining Erin's chances at Mark. Eventually, though, they bump into each other, and Jilly becomes Mark's girlfriend. Erin is (teenage) heartbroken, and thinks lowly of Mark and his actions. Later on, Jilly wants to break up with Mark because she thinks he is "losing interest" in her, and asks Erin to choose between Mark's friendship or hers. Erin chooses "not to choose", instigating a dispute. Erin writes mean things about Jilly in her private blog. Through this time, Erin has written about how she practices kissing on a pillow for Mark, made a Hate-O-Rama page for Serena, and has talked about her suspicion of Tyler leaving notes in her locker - notes that smell like his hair gel. She also comments that he is a bit geeky. Life goes on, and it comes time for the Thanksgiving Play. Once the play ended, Tyler and Erin went to her locker to retrieve the disc for the school Intranet, but unfortunately, Serena accidentally rams into Erin, while she (Erin) is still in her Corn Suit. Because of the immobility the costume causes, her arm is pinned under her body, resulting in a fractured arm and a trip to the hospital. Tyler holds onto the disc while Erin is being checked by the doctor. Because of the broken arm, she misses the Intranet launch. Little did she know, the disc that she brought was, in fact, not the school Intranet disc. Instead, her private blog is put on the Intranet, and is revealed to the entire school.

Erin receives many messages after the intranet is launched. Some are nice, agreeing that what she wrote was correct, but much more common were the mean notes. Rosie still supports her, her family along with her. Unfortunately, many other people do not, Jilly especially. Erin agrees that she did write some pretty horrible things about her, including Jilly's bruises from her bedframe that result from her fear of monsters in the night. Jilly thinks Erin released the blog to get even with her, and is embarrassed, enraged, and hurt.

In the end, Erin does a public apology through "walking spam", with more personal apologies to those most deeply affected by her blog - Jilly, Serena, Tyler, and Mark. Erin and Jilly gain a better understanding of each other, while Serena becomes more friendly. Tyler eventually does forgive her, although Erin suspects he likes another girl now. Mark decides to forgive her as well, giving her a pillow and kissing her.

== Reception ==
In its review, Kirkus Reviews wrote that "AOL-speak is too occasional and therefore jarring, but the blog segments and first-person narration are immediate and funny."

Publishers Weekly wrote, "Overall, this is a heartfelt book about a girl becoming her own person.

== Sequel ==
Click Here's sequel entitled Access Denied released on July 6, 2009. It's about Erin's grade eight year.

== Awards ==
- Winner, Colorado Book Award for Young Adult Literature
- New York Public Library Books for the Teenage
- VOYA Top Shelf Fiction for Middle School Readers
- Scholastic Book Fair/Clubs Bestselling Title
- Finalist, Louisiana Young Readers Award
- Girl's Life magazine selected Click Here as one of their "Top Ten" among books, TV, movies, and more. (April/May 2005 issue)
