= Tu Books =

Publishing imprint of Lee & Low Books

- Logo
- Parent company: Lee & Low Books
- Status: Active
- Predecessor: Tu Publishing
- Founded: 2009; 17 years ago
- Founder: Stacy Whitman
- Country of origin: United States
- Headquarters location: New York City
- Distribution: North America
- Key people: Stacy Whitman
- Nonfiction topics: Diversity
- Fiction genres: Fantasy; Mystery; Science fiction
- Official website: www.leeandlow.com/imprints/tu-books

Tu Books is a young adult and middle grade publishing imprint of Lee & Low Books. The company was founded by Stacy Whitman in 2009 as Tu Publishing before being acquired by Lee & Low in 2010. It focuses on publishing works featuring diverse characters and works written by diverse writers. Since 2012, it has administered the New Visions Award to recognize new talent in the field.

== Etymology ==
"Tu" means "you" in several languages. According to the Tu Books website, "tu" means "many" in Ainu, and their focus is to "reach the 'you' in every reader".

== History ==
Tu Publishing was founded in Orem, Utah, by Stacy Whitman as an independent young adult and middle grade fiction science fiction and fantasy book publisher through a Kickstarter campaign in December 2009. Whitman stated she wanted to increase the diversity in young adult and middle grade fiction works—including both works containing diverse characters and works written by diverse authors—and market them to a broad audience. After being laid off from Mirrorstone Books, and having many discussions regarding under-representation of people of color in published works, Whitman founded it to be "a small press dedicated to YA fantasy and science fiction featuring characters of color."

After the Kickstarter successfully funded the startup, Lee & Low Books acquired the company in March 2010, changed its name to Tu Books, and moved operations to the Lee & Low offices in New York City. They initially focused on only science fiction and fantasy, but have since expanded to include all genres.

In 2012, Tu Books established the New Visions Award.

== New Visions Award ==
Tu created the New Visions Award in 2012 for "a debut novel by a new writer of color". Past winners include Ink and Ashes by Valynne Maetani (published 2015), Rebel Seoul by Axie Oh (published 2017, originally titled The Amaterasu Project), and Ahimsa by Supriya Kelkar (published 2017).

== Awards ==
A number of works published by Tu Books have won or been nominated for awards. Summer of the Mariposas, by Guadalupe Garcia McCall, was nominated for the Andre Norton Award in 2013. Joseph Bruchac's Killer of Enemies was nominated for the 2014 Mythopoeic Fantasy Award.
