= Jenny Torres Sanchez =

American writer

Jenny Torres Sanchez is an American writer of young adult fiction.

== Biography ==
Sanchez was born in Brooklyn, New York. Her mother is from Puerto Barrios, Guatemala, and her father is from El Salvador. Around age three, Sanchez and her family moved to Uniondale on Long Island, where they lived for seven years before moving to Orlando, Florida." Sanchez currently lives in Orlando with her husband and children.

She received a Bachelor of Arts in English Literature from the University of Central Florida and attempted to receive a Master of Arts in Creative Writing, but she was rejected four times.

Sanchez initially taught English language arts but left her job to help care for her second son, who showed developmental delays at 15 months old. During this time, she began focusing on her writing her first novel, The Downside of Being Charlie, which was published in 2012.

Much of Sanchez's writing discusses difficult topics. She has stated that she hopes her books allow people going through troubling times to "help them know that the human condition is one made up of so many things: love, pain, elation, tragedy. And no matter what your situation, there are others out there who probably understand, or empathize, with what someone is going through." Even for readers who cannot relate to the material, Sanchez hopes to "foster sympathy among other readers—who might not have serious difficulties to deal with—for those teens who do."

== Awards and honors ==
Sanchez's books have received multiple awards and honors.

Kirkus Reviews included the following books on their year-end lists of the best young adult fiction: Death, Dickinson, and the Demented Life of Frenchie Garcia (2013); The Fall of Innocence (2018); and We Are Not from Here (2020).

Awards for Sanchez's writing
| Year | Title | Award | Result | Ref. |
|---|---|---|---|---|
| 2017 | Because of the Sun | Florida Book Award for Young Adult Literature | Gold | |
| 2021 | We Are Not From Here | Pura Belpré Award for Author | Finalist | |
| 2021 | We Are Not From Here | American Library Association's Best Fiction for Young Adults | Top 10 | |
| 2024 | The Collectors: Stories | Michael L. Printz Award | Winner | |

== Publications ==
=== Books ===
- The Downside of Being Charlie (2012)
- Death, Dickinson, and the Demented Life of Frenchie Garcia (2013)
- Because of the Sun (2017)
- The Fall of Innocence (2018)
- We Are Not From Here (2020)
- With Lots of Love, illustrated by Andres Ceolin (2022)

=== Short stories and essays ===
- "In the Past" in Hope Nation: YA Authors Share Personal Moments of Inspiration, edited by Rose Brock (2018)
- "Is Something Bothering You?" in Our Stories, Our Voices: 21 YA Authors Get Real About Injustice, Empowerment, and Growing Up Female in America, edited by Amy Reed (2018)
- "A Small Light" in Battle of the Bands, edited by Lauren Gibaldi and Eric Smith (2021)
- "¿Dónde Está el Duende?" in Our Shadows Have Claws, edited by Yamile Saied Méndez and Amparo Ortiz (2022)
- "Ring of Fire" in The Collectors, edited by A.S. King (2023)
