= Margarita Engle =

American children's writer (born 1951)

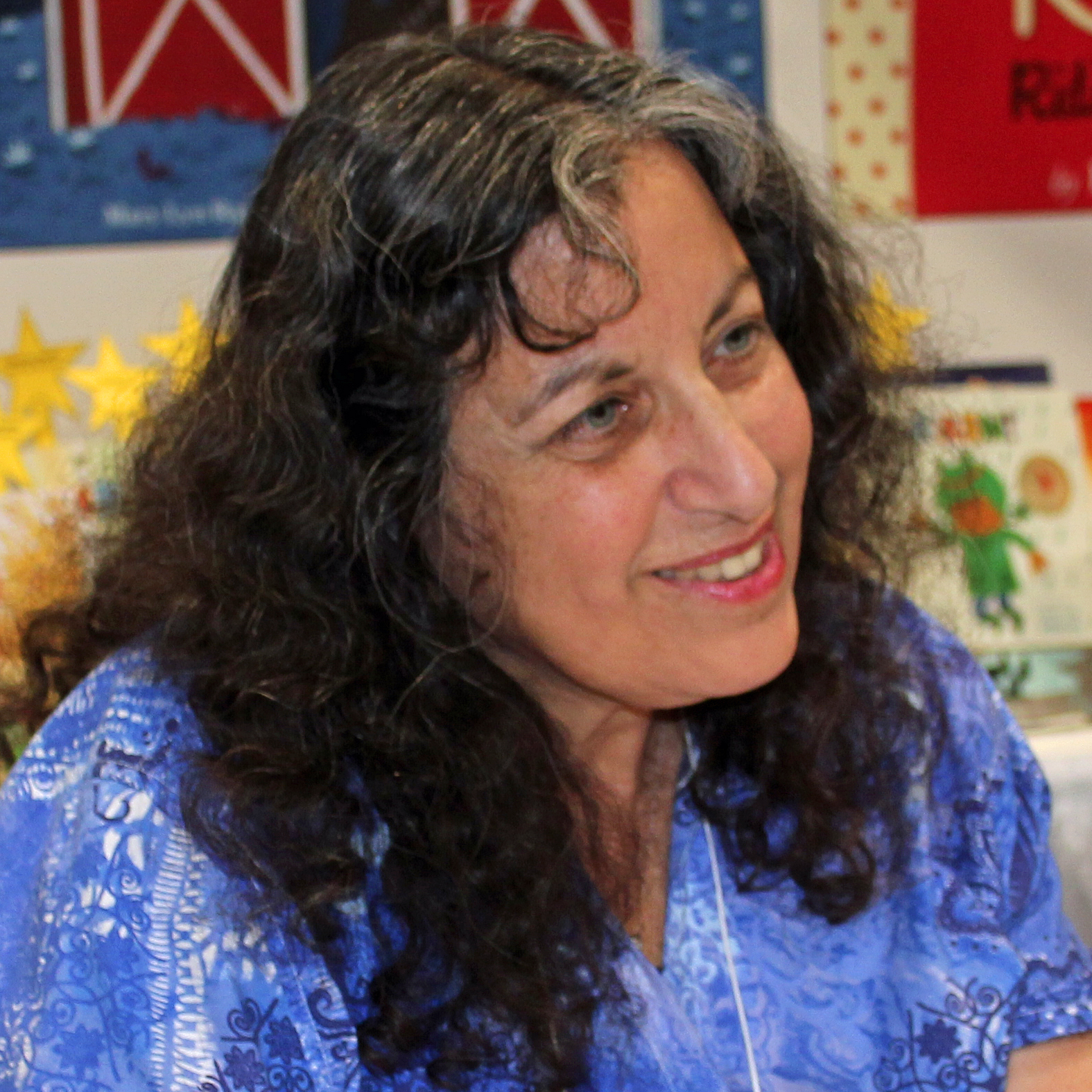
- Engle in 2014
- Born: September 2, 1951 (age 75); Pasadena, California, U.S.
- Education: California State Polytechnic University, Pomona (BS); Iowa State University (MS); University of California, Riverside
- Occupation: Writer
- Website: margaritaengle.com

Margarita Engle (born September 2, 1951) is a Cuban American poet and author. Most of Engle's novels are written in verse and are a reflection of her Cuban heritage and her appreciation of nature. She became the first Latina awarded a Newbery Honor in 2009 for The Surrender Tree: Poems of Cuba's Struggle for Freedom. She was selected by the Poetry Foundation to serve from 2017 to 2019 as the sixth Young People's Poet Laureate. In October 2018, Engle was announced the winner of the 2019 NSK Neustadt Prize for Children's Literature. Her 2024 book, Wild Dreamers, was longlisted for the National Book Award for Young People's Literature.

== Life ==
Engle's father was born in Los Angeles, California, to Ukrainian Jewish refugees, and her mother was born in Trinidad, Cuba. Although Engle was born and raised in California, growing up, she spent many summers with her extended family in Cuba. As a child, she was introduced to poetry in Spanish, particularly the works of José Martí.

Engle earned a B.S. from California State Polytechnic University in 1974, an M.S. from Iowa State University in 1977, and nearly completed a doctoral degree in biology from the University of California, Riverside, in 1983. Before starting her writing career, Engle was an associate professor of agronomy at California State Polytechnic University from 1978 to 1982. While working on her doctoral degree, she took a seminar in creative writing with Tomás Rivera, and credits this experience with igniting her passion to write.

She lives in Central California.

== Awards ==
=== Body of work ===
- 2019 NSK Neustadt Prize for Children's Literature

=== The Poet Slave of Cuba ===
- 2006 Américas Award
- 2007 ALA Best Books for Young Adults
- 2007 Bank Street College of Education Best Children's Book of the Year
- 2008 Pura Belpré Medal for Author

=== The Surrender Tree ===
- 2008 Booklist Editors' Choice: Books for Youth
- 2009 Newbery Honor
- 2009 Pura Belpré Award for Author
- 2009 Américas Award
- 2009 Jane Addams Children's Book Award for Book for Older Children
- 2009 Claudia Lewis Award for Poetry
- 2009 Lee Bennett Hopkins Poetry Award Honor Book
- 2009 ALA Best Books for Young Adults
- 2009 ALA Notable Children's Book
- 2009 NCSS/CBC Notable Social Studies Trade Book for Young People
- 2009 Amelia Bloomer Book List
- 2009-10 Michigan Great Lakes Great Books Award

=== Tropical Secrets ===
- 2010 Sydney Taylor Book Award
- 2010 Américas Award Commendation

=== The Firefly Letters ===
- 2010 Commonwealth Club of California Book Awards for Young Adult finalist
- 2011 Pura Belpré Honor for Author
- 2011 Américas Award Honor
- 2011 International Reading Association Notable Book for a Global Society
- 2011 NCSS-CBC Notable Social Studies Book
- 2011 Amelia Bloomer Book
- 2011 TAYSHAS Reading Lists

=== Hurricane Dancers ===
- 2012 Pura Belpré Honor for Author
- 2012 ALSC Notable Children's Book for Older Readers
- 2012 White Ravens selection

=== Drum Dream Girl ===
- 2015 Américas Award Commended Title
- 2016 Charlotte Zolotow Award

=== Enchanted Air ===
- 2015 Américas Award Commended Title
- 2016 Pura Belpré Medal for Author

=== Forest World ===
- 2018 Notable Social Studies Trade Books for Young People
- 2018 Green Earth Book Award for Children's Fiction
- 2018 Kansas NEA Reading Circle List Recommended Book: Intermediate
- 2018 Walter Dean Myers Honor for Younger Readers

== Selected works ==
- Singing to Cuba, Arte Público Press, 1993, ISBN 978-1-55885-070-5
- Skywriting, Bantam Books, 1995, ISBN 978-0-553-09987-4
- The Poet Slave of Cuba, a Biography of Juan Francisco Manzano, Henry Holt & Co., 2006, ISBN 978-0-8050-7706-3
- The Surrender Tree, Henry Holt & Co., 2008, ISBN 978-0-8050-8674-4
- Tropical Secrets: Holocaust Refugees in Cuba, Macmillan Publishers, 2009, ISBN 978-0-8050-8936-3
- The Firefly Letters: A Suffragette's Journey to Cuba, Henry Holt & Co., 2010, ISBN 978-0-8050-9082-6
- Summer Birds: The Butterflies of Maria Merian, Henry Holt & Co., 2010, ISBN 978-0-8050-8937-0
- Hurricane Dancers The First Caribbean Pirate Shipwreck, Henry Holt & Co., 2011, ISBN 978-0-8050-9240-0
- The Wild Book, Houghton Mifflin Harcourt, 2012, ISBN 978-0-547-58131-6
- When You Wander, Henry Holt & Co., 2013, ISBN 9780805093124
- The Lightning Dreamer, Houghton Mifflin Harcourt, 2013, ISBN 9780547807430
- Mountain Dog, Henry Holt & Co., 2013, ISBN 978-0805095166
- Orangutanka: A Story in Poems, Henry Holt & Co., 2015, ISBN 978-0-8050-9839-6
- Drum Dream Girl, Houghton Mifflin Harcourt, 2015, ISBN 9780544102293
- Enchanted Air: Two Cultures, Two Wings: A Memoir, Simon & Schuster, 2015, ISBN 9781481435239
- Lion Island: Cuba's Warrior of Words, Simon & Schuster, 2017, ISBN 9781481461122
- Dreams from Many Rivers, Henry Holt & Co., 2019, ISBN 9781627795319
- Jazz Owls: A Novel of the Zoot Suit Riots, Atheneum Books for Young Readers, 2019, ISBN 978-1-5344-0944-6
- Evamar, Atheneum Books, 2026, ISBN 9781665988070

== See also ==
- Cuban American literature
- List of Cuban-American writers
