= Georgina Lázaro =

Puerto Rican writer

- Born: San Juan, Puerto Rico
- Occupation: Poet
- Writing career
- Genre: Children's poems
- Notable work: Mi Flamboyán Amarillo (My Yellow Poinciana Tree)
- Notable awards: "Best Idea of the Year" award by the Museo de Arte de Ponce, the Ponce Chamber of Commerce honored her with an "Educator of the Year" award.

Georgina Lázaro-Leon is a Puerto Rican poet who writes children's books. Her poems have been recorded by many artists, among them Tony Croatto.

== Early years ==
Lázaro was one of eight siblings born in San Juan, Puerto Rico and raised in the Miramar neighborhood of the city. She was enrolled at the age of three in the "Colegio de la Inmaculada" school, the school in which she received both her primary and secondary education. After high school, she was accepted to the University of Puerto Rico where she earned her Bachelor of Science degree with a concentration in education.

Lázaro worked as a school teacher for various years and retired after she was married to take care of her children and her household. That is when she started to write stories and poems for and about her children.

== First works ==
In 1987, Tony Croatto, a popular Puerto Rican folksinger, discovered one of her children poems and converted it into a musical hit. In 1995, one of her poems was recorded and presented in Puerto Rico's "Centro de Bellas Artes", by Puerto Rican musician and singer Roy Brown.

Her poem "Mi Flamboyan amarillo", or "My Yellow Royal Poinciana", originally published in 1996 by Ediciones Huracan, which issued two more editions by 2001, was reissued in 2005 by Lectorum Publications, a subsidiary of Scholastic, Inc.

She has also written poems that introduce children to Federico García Lorca, Pablo Neruda, Miguel de Cervantes' Don Quixote and other mainstays of Hispanic culture, as well as "Ya llegan los Reyes Magos!", published by Lectorum in 2001, geared to promote Puerto Rico's tradition and culture. That same year Tony Croatto included nine of her poems which he recorded in his CD (compact disc). Her poem "Nuestro Capitolio", about Puerto Rico's Capitol building, was published in 2006 by the Legislative Assembly and, with over 45,000 copies in print for free distribution, is probably her most-printed poem.

== Recognitions ==
In 1997 and 1998, she was awarded a "Best Idea of Year" award by the Museo de Arte de Ponce. She was the recipient of a special tribute on behalf of the Ateneo de Ponce during their third poetry contest held in 2000. Her poem "Ya Llegaron los Reyes Magos" received a recognition from the Pen Club of Puerto Rico and in 2002, the Ponce Chamber of Commerce honored her with an "Educator of the Year" award. In January 2007, she was the recipient of a $5,000 award in recognition of her written work by the Institute of Puerto Rico.

== Present ==
Lázaro works as a volunteer in a program called "Cuéntame un Cuento" (Tell me a story) at the Museo de Arte de Ponce in Ponce, Puerto Rico. Lázaro lives in Ponce with her husband, attorney Cesar Hernandez Colon, and her son Jose Alberto.

== Books by Lázaro ==
- Dos amigos: la relación simbiótica entre el ratel y el pájaro de la miel (2024) Vista Higher Learning, Ilustrado por Lwillys Tafur
- Conoce a Jorge Luis Borges (2023) Vista Higher Learning, Ilustrado por Valeria Cis
- La dulce espera (2023) Vista Higher Learning, Ilustrado por Myrian Bahntje
- ¡Ay, cuanto daría! (2023) Vista Higher Learning, Ilustrado por Néstor Ocampo
- Pablo - Serie de Lectorum, Cuando los grandes eran pequeños, ilustrado por Marcela Donoso
- Brilla, Brilla, Linda Estrella (Shine, shine, pretty star)
- Mi Flamboyán Amarillo (My Yellow Poinciana Tree), illustrated by Lulu Delacre
- El Mejor Es Mi Papa (My Father is the Best)
- ¡Viva la tortuga! (Long live the turtle!)
- La Niña y La Estrella (The Girl and the Star)
- Ya Llegan los Reyes Magos! (The Three Kings Are Here!)
- Nuestro Capitolio (Our Capitol)
- Federico García Lorca

== See also ==
- List of Puerto Rican writers
- List of Puerto Ricans
- Puerto Rican literature
