= Susan Guevara =

American sculptor and illustrator

Susan Marie Guevara is an American sculptor and illustrator, who is best known for her illustrations in picture books. She was born in Walnut Creek, California and now lives in Santa Fe, New Mexico. Susan received a BFA in illustration from Academy of Art College in San Francisco. She took time off between her first and second years and moved to Belgium where she was able to study with Remy Van Sluys and take painting and drawing classes at Royal Academy of Fine Art. She was the first recipient of the Pura Belpré Medal Award in 1996 for Gary Soto's Chat's Kitchen. She won again in 2002 for Gary Soto's Chato and the Party Animals, and was a recipient of a Pura Belpré Honor Award for Susan Elya Middleton's Little Roja Riding Hood.

== Career ==
Guevara has illustrated over 20 books since 1990. Of her illustrations, she has stated that she does not use a set style. She researches and immerses herself into the world of the characters and the story, and she adapts her work to the setting and the characters of the work that she is illustrating. Her first illustrated picture book was Emmett’s Snowball by Ned Miller, which was published in 1990. Her work in this book received mixed reviews. Later works have received more positive reviews that praise her depiction of Latin Culture as well as her use of color and style that fits a book's text.

Guevara's illustrations from The Chato Series have been adapted beyond the books. They were adapted into a video in 1999. Additionally, during the 2006 American Library Association Annual Conference in New Orleans, Guevara began a mural at the Children’s Resource Center Library, which had been damaged during Hurricane Katrina. This mural featured characters from the book Chato and the Party Animals and was entitled "Tambien de dolor se canta cuando llorar no se puede" or "Sorrow also sings when it runs too deep to cry." This mural was finished in November 2011.

== Awards ==
- 2015, Pura Belpré Honor award for Illustration for Little Roja Riding Hood
- 2014, New York Public Library acknowledgment for one of the 100 Best Books of the Last 100 Years for Chato's Kitchen
- 2006, June Franklin Naylor Award for the Best Book for Children on Texas History for The Lady in the Blue Cloak
- 2005, New York Times Ten Best Illustrated Books of the Year for Chato Goes Cruisin'
- 2004, Sigurd Olson Children’s book award for Isabel’s House of Butterflies
- 2002, Pura BelPré Medal Award for Chato and the Party Animals
- 2001, American Library Association Notable Book for Chato and the Party Animals
- 1995, Book Links “A Few Good Books of the Year”
- 1995, Child Study Children’s Book Committee Book of the Year
- 1997, California Young Reader Nominee for Chato's Kitchen
- 1996, American Library Association Notable Book for Chato's Kitchen
- 1996, Pura BelPré Medal Award for Chato's Kitchen
- 1996, Tomás Rivera Award for Chato's Kitchen
- 1995, Americas Award for Children’s & Young Adult Literature Honorable Mention for Chato's Kitchen
- 1995, Certificate of Excellence Parenting Magazine Award
- 1995, Parents’ Choice Honor Award for Chato's Kitchen

== Publications ==
=== As Illustrator ===
- 1990, Emmett’s Snowball by Ned Miller
- 1991, The Class with the Summer Birthdays by Dian Curtis Reagan
- 1992, I Have an Aunt on Marlborough Street by Kathryn Lasky
- 1993, The Boardwalk Princess by Arthur Levine
- 1995, The King’s Commissioners by Aileen Friedman
- 1995, Chato’s Kitchen by Gary Soto
- 1996, Favorite Fairy Tales Told in Italy retold by Virginia Haviland
- 2000, My Daughter, My Son, The Eagle, The Dove by Ana Castillo
- 2000, Chato and the Party Animals by Gary Soto
- 2000, Not One Damsel in Distress—World Folktales for Strong Girls by Jane Yolen
- 2002, Tiger, Tiger by Dee Lillegard
- 2003, Isabel’s House of Butterflies by Tony Johnston
- 2005, Chato Goes Cruisin’ by Gary Soto
- 2006, Tales Our Abuelitas Told by Alma Flor Ada and Isabel Campoy
- 2006, The Lady in the Blue Cloak by Eric Kimmel
- 2007, Numero Uno by Arthur and Alex Dorros
- 2008, Voice From Afar by Tony Johnston
- 2011, The Wild Women of the Wild West by Jonah Winter
- 2014, Little Roja Riding Hood by Susan Elya Middleton
- 2019, Journey Toward Hope by Coert Voorhees and Victor J. Hinojosa
