= We Are Not from Here =

2020 young adult novel by Jenny Torres Sanchez

- Author: Jenny Torres Sanchez
- Language: English
- Publisher: Philomel Books
- Publication date: May 19, 2020
- Pages: 326
- ISBN: 978-1-984-81226-1

We Are Not From Here is a young adult novel by Jenny Torres Sanchez, published May 19, 2020 by Philomel Books.

== Reception ==
We Are Not From Here was generally well-received by critics, including starred reviews from Booklist, BookPage, Kirkus Reviews, Publishers Weekly, and School Library Journal. Reviewers called the book "gripping," "poignant," "powerful," "stunning, visceral and deeply moving." Publishers Weekly called it "devastating read that is difficult to put down," and School Library Journal referred to it as a "candid, realistic story that will leave readers thinking."

Highlighting the manner in which Sanchez discusses the teenagers' refugee status, Publishers Weekly said the "book unflinchingly illuminates the experiences of those leaving their homes to seek safety in the United States."

BookPage highlighted the book's first-person narration, calling the choice "particularly effective," noting that it "adds immediacy to the threats that seem to lie in wait around every corner."

Reviewers also highlighted Sanchez's use of magical realism, saying it "recall[s] the works of Gabriel García Márquez." BookPage noted, "Elements of magical realism elevate the teens’ journey to epic, mythic heights."

BookPage, the Chicago Public Library, Kirkus Reviews, the New York Public Library, and School Library Journal named it one of the best books of the year.

We Are Not From Here also received the following accolades:

- Pura Belpré Award (2021)
- American Library Association Best Fiction for Young Adults Top Ten (2021)
