= Harriet Rohmer =

American author, editor, and publisher

Harriet Rohmer (born 1938) is an American author, editor and publisher who won an American Book Award and founded Children's Book Press. She worked for UNESCO in Paris on Third World cultural programs. Her work appears in Passages North, the Louisville Review, the Jewish Women's Literary Annual and Zeek.

== Works ==
- Legend of Food Mountain: LA Montana Del Alimento
- Mr. Sugar Came to Town, 1989
- The Woman Who Outshone the Sun
- Last of the Refuge Cities
- Just Like Me
- Uncle Nacho's Hat
- Honoring Our Ancestors
- Heroes of the Environment, 2009
