= John Parra (illustrator) =

American illustrator (born 1972)

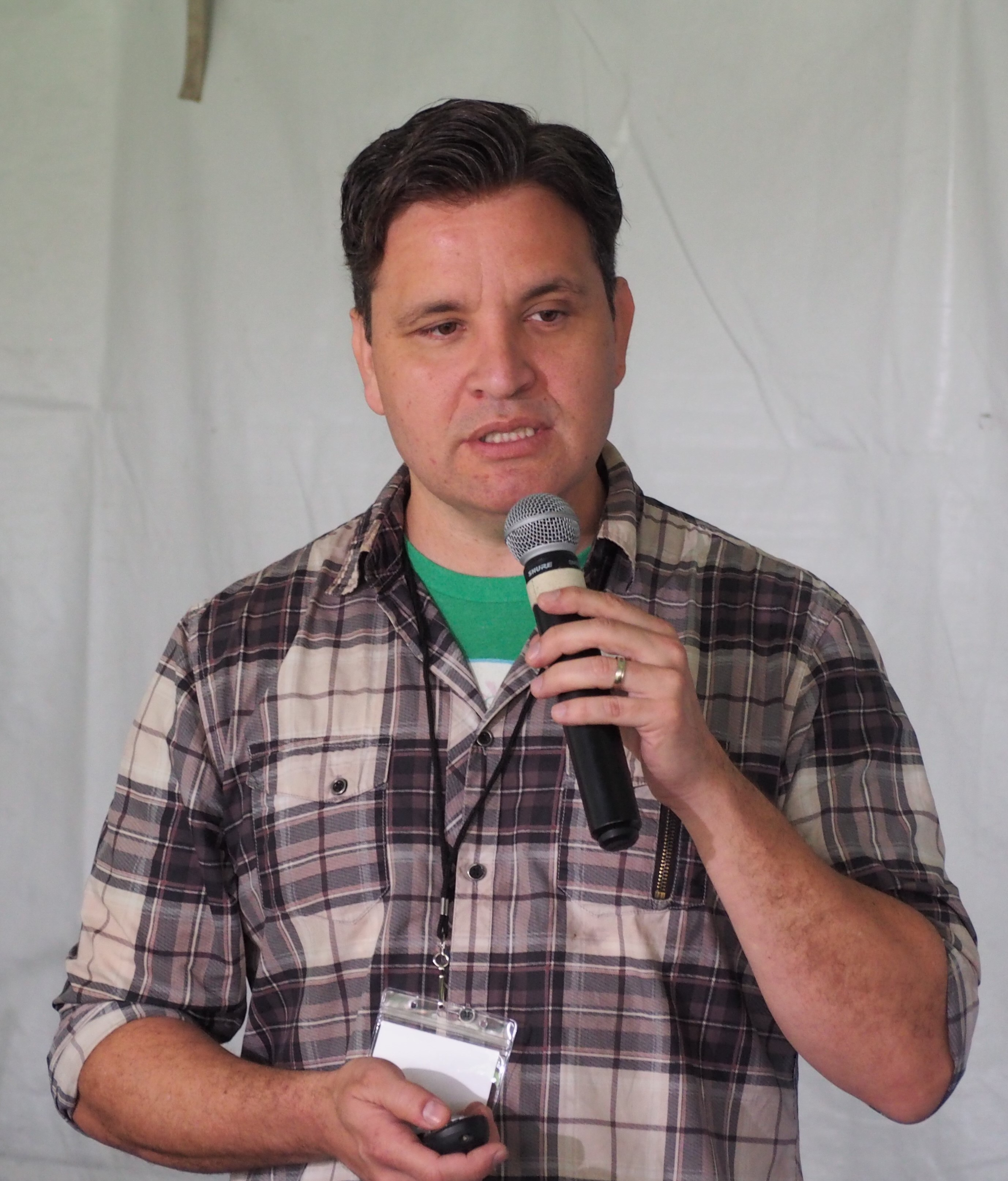
- Parra at the 2018 Gaithersburg Book Festival
- Born: 1972 (age 53–54); Santa Barbara, California, U.S.
- Education: Art Center College of Design
- Occupation: Illustrator
- Awards: Pura Belpré Illustrator Honor Book Award; Golden Kite Award; Christopher Award; International Latino Book Award
- Website: johnparraart.com

John Parra (born 1972) is an American illustrator. Parra's books have received awards including the Pura Belpré Illustrator Honor Book Award, Golden Kite Award, Christopher Award, and an International Latino Book Award. He has additionally worked as an illustrator for corporate marketing campaigns and as an art instructor.

== Early life ==
John Parra was born in 1972 in Santa Barbara, California. He later graduated from the Art Center College of Design in Pasadena.

== Book illustration ==
Parra received an International Latino Book Award for Best Children's Book Interior Illustrations in 2006 for his first illustrated book My Name is / Me llamo Gabriela. In 2009 his work Gracias / Thanks received a Pura Belpré Illustrator Honor Book Award as well as a SCBWI Golden Kite Award. In 2012 his book Waiting for the Biblioburro received a Christopher Award.

In 2015 Parra's book Green Is a Chile Pepper received another Pura Belpré Illustrator Honor Book Award. In 2015 his work was also shown in a one-day presentation at the Metropolitan Museum of Art; Parra's works have been shown in both solo and group art exhibitions. The next year he illustrated the children's book Marvelous Cornelius: Hurricane Katrina and the Spirit of New Orleans, based upon the fall-out of Hurricane Katrina and the real-life story of New Orleans sanitation worker Cornelius Washington, who died in 2008. The book received a Golden Kite Award.

In 2017, his illustrated children's book Frida Kahlo and Her Animalitos was named to the New York Times/NY Public Library's: Best Illustrated Children's Book of 2017. The book centers on the early years of artist Frida Kahlo and the animals that surrounded her childhood. The book was also received the Barnes & Noble Best Book of 2017 award, was named to the Smithsonian Top Ten Best Children's Books of 2017 list, and received his third Pura Belpré Illustrator Honor Book Award. At the 2019 Golden Kite Awards & Gala, Parra presented one of his illustrations from the book We Are the Change: Words of Inspiration from Civil Rights Leaders to Supreme Court Justice Sonia Sotomayor, which he had based upon a quote from her career.

In 2022, Parra released his picture book biography, Growing an Artist: The Story of a Landscaper and His Son (available in English and Spanish editions) detailing how he spent his young years working with his father's landscaping company which lead to his love of drawing and illustration.

Parra describes his process of making portraits personal in books. He works primarily in acrylic on board, first applying layers of color over gesso and sanding them to create a worn, textured surface. He then transfers his sketches, masks out shapes with tape, and builds each scene step by step, adding shading and detail as the final touch. Each painting may take up to a week, and a complete picture book typically requires six to eight months.

== Teaching ==
Parra has also provided illustrator's workshops to young artists and high-school students and has served as an instructor at the Carnegie Art Museum.

== Other work ==
In 2017 Parra illustrated for the Delicioso Forever Stamps distributed by the US postal service. Over two years Parra developed six stamps derived from popular dishes originating from Mexico, Central and South America, and the Caribbean. Using bright colors, the six foods selected were tamales, flan, empanadas, chile rellenos, ceviche, and sancocho. In 2023, Dot Magazine, the alumni publication of ArtCenter College of Design featured Parra in an article highlighting his creative journey and his illustration of the Latino Food stamps for the United States Postal Service. Parra credited the art college for helping him refine his artistic voice, which draws inspiration from American, Hispanic, and Latino folk art. In summer 2023, the Smithsonian National Postal Museum hosted Parra for programs centered on his stamp designs and illustrations. The sessions highlighted his design process, artistic influences, and exploration of Hispanic heritage, engaging audiences through discussions of creativity and problem solving. . As an illustrator, he has also worked on advertising campaigns for companies including Jeep, United Airlines, PBS, and National Geographic, in addition to film, book, and computer companies.
