= Lulu Delacre =

Puerto Rican writer

- Born: December 20, 1957 (age 68); Rio Piedras, Puerto Rico
- Occupations: children's author and illustrator
- Writing career
- Period: 1996-
- Genre: Latino/Hispanic
- Website: www.luludelacre.com

Lulu Delacre (born December 20, 1957, in Rio Piedras, Puerto Rico) is the author/illustrator of many award winning children's books. Some of her most famous works include Arroz con leche: Popular Songs and Rhymes from Latin America, Vejigante Masquerader, and The Bossy Gallito. Delacre's writes books that celebrate her Latino heritage and promote cultural diversity.

== Early life ==
Delacre was born in Rio Piedras, Puerto Rico. Her parents are from Argentina and were both teachers at the University of Puerto Rico. As a child she spent many days at her grandmother's house, drawing and coloring on large sheets of white paper. At age ten, a family friend, who was an artist and a teacher encouraged Delacre to enroll in one of her painting classes, where she received formal art training and discovered her passion. In high school, Delacre decided she wanted to become an artist. After graduating she moved to Paris where she studied photography, typography, design and illustration at the Ecole Supérieure d'Arts Graphiques.

== Career ==
In 2004, Delacre's younger daughter, Alicia, was killed in a car accident. Thereafter, Delacre wrote Alicia Afterimage, a nonfiction novel based on conversations Delacre had with Alicia's friends following the accident. In addition to being a full-time author and illustrator, she visits many schools across the country as well as overseas, reading and sharing her literature with children. Delacre currently resides in Silver Spring, Maryland, with her husband.

== Writing style ==
Delacre creates books that honor the folklore and traditions of her childhood, both in English and Spanish. "I delight in creating books that portray my own culture with authenticity in both words and pictures," Delacre noted on her Web site. "And if painting the people and the places of Latin America true to their own beauty fosters respect; or if sharing some of their golden tales builds bridges, I want to keep on doing it. She says she translates from Spanish to English in her head when she writes in English (that language which she says allows her "to reach the largest audience"), and when she does the Spanish version she tries to make it sound as original and independent as possible.

== Honors and awards ==
- Vejigantes Masquerader, Americas Book Award
- The Bossy Gallito, Pura Belpre Illustrator Award Honor
- Arrorró, Mi Niño : Latino Lullabies and Gentle Games, Pura Belpre Illustrator Award Honor
- The Storyteller's Candle: La velita de los cuentos, Pura Belpre Illustrator Award Honor
- ¡Olinguito, de la A a la Z! Descubriendo el bosque nublado: Olinguito from A to Z! Unveiling the Cloud Forest, Orbis Pictus Award Honor

== Delacre's works ==
=== Written and illustrated ===
- A.B.C. Rhymes, Little Simon (New York, NY), 1984.
- Counting Rhymes, Little Simon (New York, NY), 1984.
- Kitten Rhymes, Little Simon (New York, NY), 1984.
- Lullabies, Little Simon (New York, NY), 1984.
- Nathan and Nicholas Alexander, Scholastic Inc. (New York, NY), 1986.
- Nathan's Fishing Trip, Scholastic Inc. (New York, NY), 1988.
- Good Time with Baby, Grosset & Dunlap (New York, NY), 1989.
- Time for School, Nathan!, Scholastic Inc. (New York, NY), 1989.
- Arroz con leche: Popular Songs and Rhymes from Latin America, translation by Elena Paz, Scholastic Inc. (New York, NY), 1989.
- Las navidades: Popular Christmas Songs from Latin America, translation by Elena Paz, Scholastic Inc. (New York, NY), 1990.
- Peter Cottontail's Easter Book, Scholastic Inc. (New York, NY), 1991.
- Nathan's Balloon Adventure, Scholastic Inc. (New York, NY), 1991.
- Vejigantes Masquerader, Scholastic Inc. (New York, NY), 1993.
- Golden Tales: Myths, Legends, and Folktales from Latin America, Scholastic Inc. (New York, NY), 1996.
- Salsa Stories, Scholastic Inc. (New York, NY), 2000.
- Rafi and Rosi, HarperCollins (New York, NY), 2003.
- Arrorró mi niño: Latino Lullabies and Gentle Games, Lee & Low Books (New York, NY), 2004.
- Rafi and Rosi: Carnival!, HarperCollins (New York, NY), 2006.
- How Far Do You Love Me?, Lee & Low Books (New York, NY), 2013.
- ¡Olinguito, de la A a la Z! Descubriendo el bosque nublado: Olinguito from A to Z! Unveiling the Cloud Forest, Children's Book Press/ Lee & Low Books (New York, NY), 2016.
- Us, in Progress: Short Stories About Young Latinos, Harper Collins (New York, NY), 2017.
- Rafi and Rosi: Music! Lee & Low Books (New York, NY), 2019.
- Luci Soars, Philomel Books (New York, NY), 2020.
- Cool Green: Amazing, Remarkable Trees, Candlewick Press (Massachusetts), 2023.
- Verde fresco: Árboles asombrosos y extraordinarios, Candlewick Press, 2023

=== Illustrated ===
- Hannah Kimball, Maria and Mr. Feathers, Follett Pub. Co. (Chicago, IL), 1982.
- Oretta Leigh, Aloysius Sebastian Mozart Mouse, Simon & Schuster (New York, NY), 1984.
- Beatrix Potter, The Tale of Peter Rabbit, and Other Stories, J. Messner (New York, NY), 1985.
- Kenneth Grahame, The Wind in the Willows: The Open Road, Little Simon (New York, NY), 1985.
- Lucía M. González, reteller, The Bossy Gallito, Scholastic Inc. (New York, NY), 1994.
- Lucía M. González, reteller, Señor Cat's Romance, and Other Favorite Stories from Latin America, Scholastic Inc. (New York, NY), 1997.
- Lucía M. González, author, The Storyteller's Candle: La velita de los cuentos, Children's Book Press, 2008
- José Martí, author. Los zapaticos de rosa, Editorial Everest (León, Spain), 1997.
- Carmen T. Bernier-Grand, Shake It, Morena!, and Other Folklore from Puerto Rico, Millbrook Press (Brookfield, CT), 2002.
- Georgina Lázaro, El flamboyán amarillo, Lectorum Publications (New York, NY), 2004.
- Sonia Sotomayor, Turning Pages, Philomel Books (New York, NY), 2018.

=== Written ===
- Alicia Afterimage, Lee & Low Books (New York, NY), 2008.

== Interviews ==
- Interview with Lulu Delacre, Author of Alicia Afterimage
- BookTalk with Lulu Delacre, Illustrator of Arrorró, mi niño: Latino Lullabies and Gentle Games
- Meet the Authors and Illustrators: Lulu Delacre
- "Rafi and Rosi"
