= Carmen Bernier-Grand =

Writer and educator

- Born: November 22, 1947 (age 78); Coamo, Puerto Rico
- Education: University of Puerto Rico at Mayagüez; Pontifical Catholic University of Puerto Rico
- Occupations: Writer and educator
- Writing career
- Language: Spanish; English
- Genre: Children books in verse
- Subject: Picture book biographies
- Notable awards: Pura Belpré Honors; 2010, 2008, 2006

Carmen T. Bernier-Grand (born in Coamo, Puerto Rico on November 22, 1947) is a Hispanic educator and author of notable and award winning books for children and young adults. Most of her books are written in verse and reflect her Puerto Rican heritage. She has also written picture book biographies about prominent Latin Americans.

== Early life ==
Bernier-Grand was born and raised in Puerto Rico. As a child, she enjoyed writing and making up stories. She obtained a B.S. from the Catholic University of Puerto Rico in 1968; a M.S. from University of Puerto Rico - Mayaguez in 1972. In the late 1970s, she moved to the United States mainland to pursue doctoral studies in advanced mathematics at the University of Connecticut.

== Career ==
Before becoming an author, Bernier-Grand worked as a math instructor at the University of Puerto Rico and later, as a computer programmer in Portland, OR. In 1981, she decided to stay home to raise her children and began writing stories. Currently, she is an established author of numerous bilingual books, a presenter of creative writing workshops, and a multicultural storyteller. She has won three Pura Belpré Honors.

== Selected works ==
Juan Bobo: Folktales From Puerto Rico (Harpercollins, 1994)

Poet and Politician of Puerto Rico: Don Luis Muñoz Marín (Orchard Books, 1995)

In the Shade of the Níspero Tree (Orchard Books, 1999)

Shake It, Morena! And Other Folklore From Puerto Rico

César: ¡Si, Se Puede! Yes, We Can! (Marshall Cavendish, 2004)

Frida: ¡Viva la vida! Long Live Life! (Marshall Cavendish, 2007)

Diego: Bigger than Life (Marshall Cavendish, 2009)

Sonia Sotomayor: Supreme Court Justice (Two Lions, September 1, 2010)

Alicia Alonso: Prima Ballerina (Two Lions, September 1, 2011)

Our Lady Guadalupe (Two Lions, April 1, 2012)
