= The Surrender Tree: Poems of Cuba's Struggle for Freedom =

2008 novel by Margarita Engle

- Author: Margarita Engle
- Language: English
- Genre: Narrative verse
- Publisher: Square Fish
- Publication date: 2008
- Publication place: United States
- Media type: Print
- Pages: 384
- ISBN: 978-0312608712
- OCLC: 156845784

The Surrender Tree: Poems of Cuba's Struggle for Freedom is a verse novel set in Cuba, written by Margarita Engle and published in 2008. It received the award of a John Newbery Honor in 2009.

== Plot ==
The novel opens in Cuba in 1886, at a time when it was still ruled by the Spanish Empire and Cubans have fought for years for their independence. Rosa, considered by some to be a witch, is a nurse that has the gift of healing. As a child she learns a holistic way of healing with flowers and herbs. Ten years later she uses these skills to aid the suffering, as many people starve and grow sick in Weyler's concentration camps. Rosa does not discriminate against anyone needing help, and turns caves into hospitals that are hidden and known only to a few. The slave hunter, Lieutenant Death, has become obsessed with finding Rosa, and destroying the hospitals that she has created.

== Characters ==
- Rosa: once a slave and then turned into a nurse healer
- Lieutenant Death: Slave hunter
- Valeriano Weyler, 1st Duke of Rubí: A ruthless army officer
- Silvia: orphan child

== Historical basis ==
The character of Rosa is based on a historical Cuban heroine, Rosa Castellanos, known as “La bayamesa”. However, the real Rosa was born in 1834 and would have been in her fifties and sixties in the period covered by the novel.

== Critical reception ==
The Surrender Tree received positive reviews. The Horn Book Magazine wrote, “A powerful narrative in free verse...haunting.” Voice of Youth Advocates called the poems "short but incredibly evocative”. School Library Journal said that the poems were, “Hauntingly beautiful, revealing pieces of Cuba’s troubled past through the poetry of hidden moments” Kirkus Reviews noted that, “Young readers will come away inspired by these portraits of courageous ordinary people” and that “Engle writes her new book in clear, short lines of stirring free verse caught by the compelling narrative voices, many readers will want to find out more.”

== Awards ==
- 2009 Newbery Honor
- 2009 Pura Belpre Medal
- 2009 Claudia Lewis Award
- 2009 Jane Adams Children's Book
- Michigan Great Lakes Great Books Award Master List
- Lee Bennett Hopkins Honor
- ALA Best Books for Young Adults
- Americas Award
- Booklist Editor's Choice
- Junior Library Guild Selection
- ALA Notable Book
- NCSS-CBC Notable Social Studies Book
- Amelia Bloomer Book
- Kansas State Reading Circle

== See also ==
- Santiago Surrender Tree
- Rosa Castellanos article at Spanish Wikipedia
