= Guadalupe Garcia McCall =

Mexican author, poet, and educator

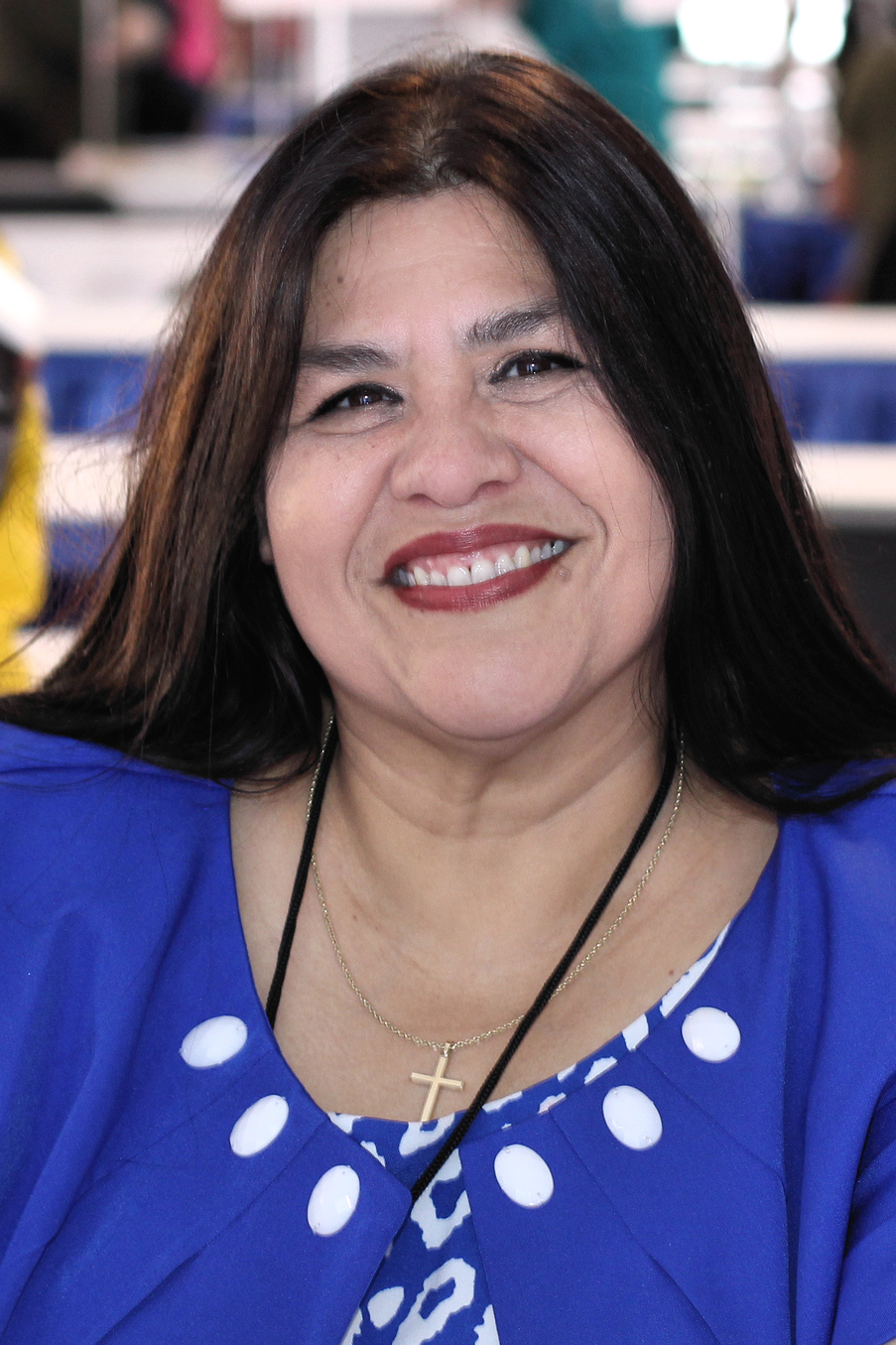
McCall at the 2018 Texas Book Festival

Guadalupe García McCall is an author, poet, and educator. She was born in Piedras Negras, Coahuila, Mexico. She is the recipient of the 2012 Pura Belpré Medal for narrative.

== Early life ==
Guadalupe García McCall was born in Coauhila, a Mexican state adjacent to Texas. She immigrated to the United States with her family when she was six years old, and grew up in Eagle Pass, a small border town in South Texas. When McCall was 17 years old, she lost her mother to cancer, and has since "found solace in her writing and in her education".

== Career ==
She holds a B.A. in Theatre and English from Sul Ross State University in Alpine and a Master of Fine Arts in Creative Writing from the University of Texas at El Paso. McCall currently serves as an assistant professor of English at George Fox University in Newberg, Oregon. Her first novel, Under the Mesquite, debuted in October 2011 and received the prestigious Pura Belpré Award for narrative in 2012. She has written three more young adult novels in addition to many stories and poems that have been published in periodicals. García McCall has been called "a leading voice in Chicana and Latina children’s and young adult literature".

== Awards ==
Year	Work	Award	Category	Result	Ref
2012	Under the Mesquite	Américas Award	—	Honorable Mention	
2012	Under the Mesquite	International Latino Book Award	Adventure/Drama – English	Honorable Mention	
2012	Under the Mesquite	Pura Belpré Award	Author	Won	
2013	Under the Mesquite	Tomás Rivera Award	—	Won	
2013	Summer of the Mariposas	Amelia Bloomer Project List	—	Selected	
2013	Summer of the Mariposas	Nebula Award	Andre Norton Award	Shortlisted	
2013	Summer of the Mariposas	Westchester Young Adult Fiction Award	Fiction	Won	

== Bibliography ==
=== Novels ===
- —— (2011). Under the Mesquite. New York: Lee and Low Books.
- —— (2012). Summer of the Mariposas. New York: Tu Books.
- —— (2016). Shame the Stars. New York: Tu Books.
- —— (2018). All the Stars Denied. New York: Tu Books.
- —— (2023). Secret of the Moon Conch. New York: Bloomsbury YA. Co-written with David Bowles.
- (2025) Fall of the Fireflies. Lee & Low Books.
