= Adriana García Roel =

Mexican writer (1916–2003)

- Born: June 4 1916
- Died: Octobre 26 2003
- Other name: nadie or nadien
- Education: National Autonomous University of Mexico
- Occupations: novelist, writer
- Notable work: El Hombre de Barro (The Man of Clay)
- Spouse: Julio R. de la Garza
- Awards: Lanz Duret Award 1942

Adriana García Roel (June 4, 1916 - October 26, 2003) was a writer and professor from Monterey, Nuevo León, author of the novel El Hombre de Barro, (The Man of Clay) written when she was 26 years old. She also wrote two other novels, published nearly fifty years later. García Roel is considered, alongside Irma Sabina Sepúlveda, one of the pioneers of the women's literary movement in Nuevo León during the 20th century, a time when women were largely confined to household roles.

== Early years and education ==
Adriana Garcia Roel was the daughter of Mario A. García, the chief dispatcher at an old gas station, and María Roel, the sister of historian Santiago Roel. She was the eldest of five siblings. Her father was fond of the literary work El Quijote, a passion he passed on to his daughter. At the same time, she also began to develop her writing skills, and at nine years old she began editing a family newspaper named Pinocho that featured various sections.

She completed her GED at the American College of Monterrey and at the Laurens Institute in her hometown. Later, she earned specialized diplomas in literature at the National Autonomous University of Mexico (UNAM), one of which focused exclusively on the analysis of El Quijote, the literary work that would profoundly influence her life.

== Career ==
Once she concluded her studies, García Roel worked teaching English in Monterrey and at the same time began work writing short stories and essays that were published in newsletters like Revista de revistas , El Día or Continental; however she thought it was embarrassing to have her works read by people she knew, so she signed her works with pseudonyms “Nada” or “Nadien”. On one occasion, apparently by mistake, the editor of Revista de revistas published one of her stories with her real name, something that was celebrated by her family, however, according to the author, her father warned her that she had chosen two of the worst paid careers in Mexico: Being a teacher and a writer

In 1942, Garcia Roel was recognized for one of her works, winning the Lanz Duret award, it was awarded by the newspaper El Universal with the publication of her novel El Hombre de Barro. The novel deals with the lives of peasants in Montemorelos, Nuevo León, in which her family had a home. Her work was mostly well received however, she did not escape criticism, with some authors saying her work lacked many literary elements and resembled a news report rather than a novel. Regardless, the newspaper that held the contest published the novel in bindable booklet form and the editorial Porrúa would also publish it. Subsequently the University of Nuevo León published a digital version for literature students.

== Publications ==
=== Novels ===
- El hombre de barro en 1943.
- Apuntes ribereños en 1955.
- Lucía la de Tlalpan en 2003.
