= Adriana M. Garcia =

American artist and muralist

Adriana M. Garcia is an artist, and muralist born and raised in San Antonio, Texas.

== Biography ==
Garcia was born in a family of artists who inspired to pursue a career in art. Garcia earned a Bachelor of Fine Arts with Honors from the Carnegie Mellon School of Art, Pittsburgh, Pennsylvania in 1999.

== Art ==
De Todos Caminos Somos Todos Uno is a mural competed in 2018, commissioned by the San Antonio River Authority.

Garcia has illustrated children's books written by Xeelena Gonzalez titled Where Wonder Grown (2022) and Remembering (2023) and a book written by Monica Brown titled El cuarto turquesa/The Turquoise Room (2023).
