= Denise Vega =

American writer

- Education: B.A,. University of California, Los Angeles; MFA, Harvard University
- Occupations: Novelist, educator
- Children: 3
- Writing career
- Genre: Young adult fiction
- Website: denisevega.com

Denise Vega is an author of young-adult novels and of children's picture books and a faculty member at Regis University. Her debut novel, Click Here : (To Find Out How I Survived Seventh Grade), was released in December 2007 by Little, Brown.

== Education ==
She has a bachelor's degree in film and television from the University of California, Los Angeles and a master of education degree from Harvard University.

== Career ==
In the 1990s, Vega, who lives in Denver, Colorado, wrote how-to HTML, word-processing, and internet help books for kids, including, Learning The Internet For Kids: A Voyage of Internet Treasures and Learning Word Processing For Kids, released by DDC Publishing.

Her debut novel, Click Here, which was written from the point of view of a seventh-grader, was included in the 2012 London Book Fair.

Her other works include short stories and poems, such as "Jacinta's Zoo" in Spider magazine in April 2004, the poem "Tortillas" for Ladybug magazine in July 2004, "Eva's Eggflip" for Highlights for Children Magazine in December 2003 — where was selected as Author of the Month for the "Eva's Egglip" story, "Abuelita's Ear" for Pockets magazine in March 2002.

She also has written science-related articles for Discovery Channel School's series of Student Activity Books.

Her first effort at writing a book, titled The Laziness Of Peter Rabbit, was written when she was 12 years old for her younger sister, Cheryl, who was six. The book was made of construction paper, bound with yarn, and used her own illustrations.

303 Magazine described her work as including "characters on their path towards adulthood from two of her books, Rock On and Click Here." Rock On, released in 2012 by Little, Brown Books for Young Readers. The characters in Access Denied (and other eighth grade error messages,) cope with adolescence.

Vega teaches a master's fine arts creating writing court at Regis University.

== Reception ==
School Library Journal, in its March 2017 "Popular Picks" review of If Your Monster Won't Go to Bed, wrote, "A superb example of picture book collaboration, this appealing title will be popular in most collections."

Kirkus Reviews wrote in its review of Click This, "AOL-speak is too occasional and therefore jarring, but the blog segments and first-person narration are immediate and funny."

Publishers Weekly reviewed five of her titles, including Click This, The Secret Blog of Raisin Rodriguez, Rock On, Access Denied, If Your Monster Won’t Go to Bed and Grandmother, Have the Angels Come? (illustrated by Erin Eitter Kono,), commenting that her young "readers will be too busy giggling to go to sleep."

== Awards ==
In 2006, Vega's Click Here made New York Public Library Books for the Teen Age's Best Books list.

In 2008, Click Here was a Louisiana Young Readers' Choice Award finalist.

Rock On was a 2013 Colorado Book Awards Finalist.
