= George Ancona =

American photographer and writer (1929–2021)

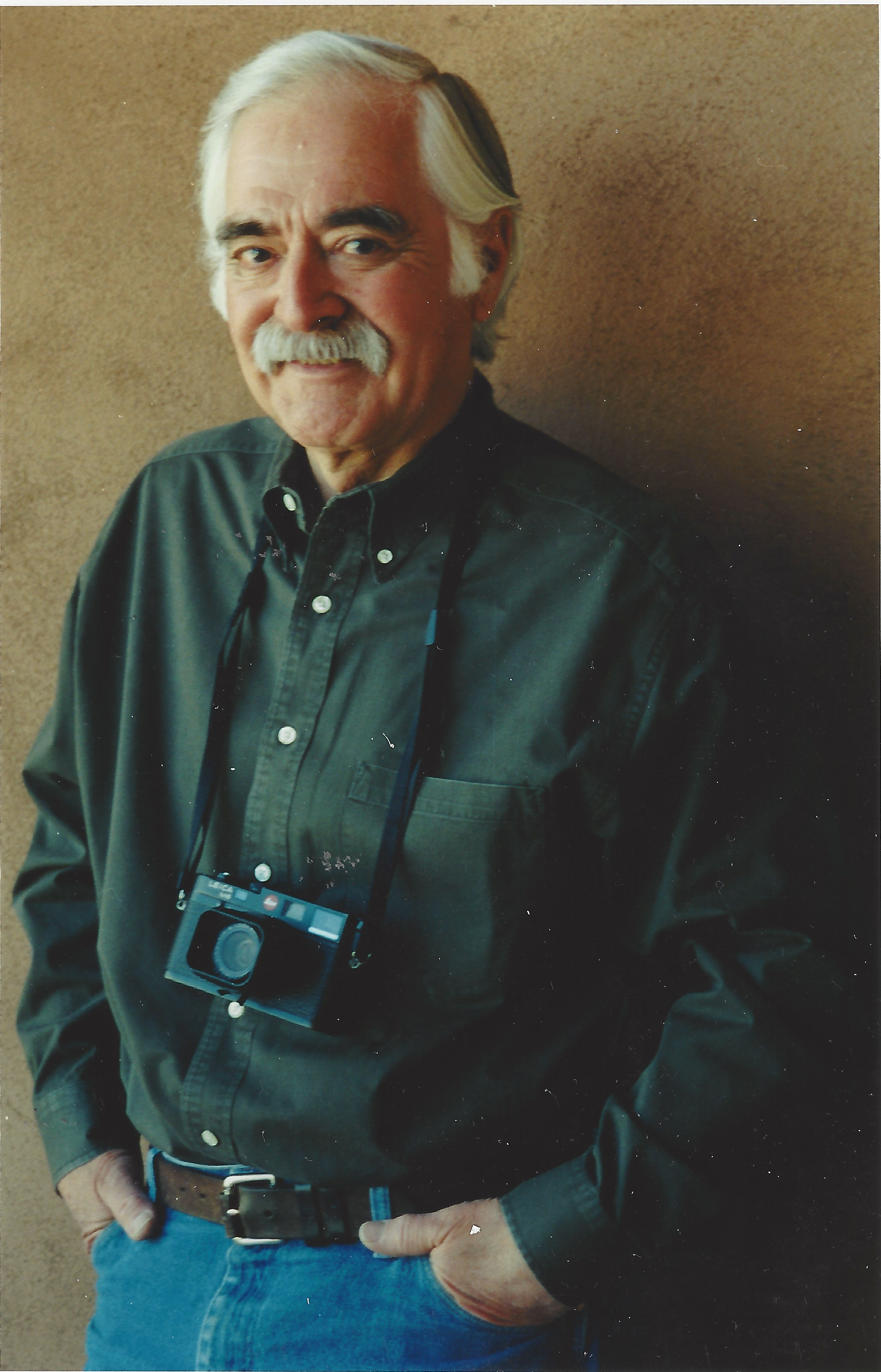
- Born: George Efrain Ancona; December 4, 1929; Brooklyn, New York, U.S.
- Died: January 1, 2021 (aged 92); Santa Fe, New Mexico, U.S.
- Occupations: Photographer, Writer, Designer, Filmmaker, Artist
- Writing career
- Genre: Children's literature

George Ancona (December 4, 1929 – January 1, 2021) was an American photo essayist and creator of photo-illustrated children's picture books. He was born and raised in Brooklyn, New York, the son of immigrants from Mexico. He is renowned for creating vivid photo essays that invite children to immerse themselves in new places and cultures, to appreciate the work of everyday life and to accept themselves as well as others. His intimate portraits and straightforward writings celebrate his own Mexican heritage and depression-era upbringing in Brooklyn, NY. Trained as an artist and graphic designer, he entered the children's book field initially as a photographer, and over the past fifty years has authored, photographed and designed over one hundred books that are beloved by children and librarians throughout the Americas.

== Early life and education ==
Ancona was born in 1929 at the start of the Great Depression in Brooklyn, NY. His parents had come separately a few years earlier from Mérida, Yucatán. They married and after first living over an Italian bakery in Williamsburg, settled in Coney Island amidst other recent immigrants from Italy, Ireland and Russia. George attended P.S. 80 Elementary School and spent his free time playing and later working at Coney Island’s notorious Steeplechase Amusement Park. He painted signs for Coney Island at "12 or 13" years and as a teenager "knew I would become an artist".

At Abraham Lincoln High School, he had the privilege of being part of the elite Art Squad, led by famed art teacher Leon Friend. While in high school, Ancona was provided the opportunity to present his portfolio to the Mexican artist Rufino Tamayo. Upon graduation, George traveled to Mexico City by bus, and Tamayo arranged for him to study tuition-free at the Academia de San Carlos, where he took courses in drawing, sculpture, and fresco mural painting for five months.

Returning to New York, George took night courses at Art Students League and The Cooper Union, while starting his career in design by day at the New York Times. Confident in his skills, he stopped his studies and moved to Esquire, working alongside classmates Milton Glaser, Seymour Chwast and Art Kane. With a growing family, he soon moved on to Madison Avenue and worked as an art director at Grey Advertising and later Daniel & Charles Advertising.

== Career ==
Over the years, he had hired and learned from many photographers, and he came to realize that they were having more fun than he was. In 1961, he stepped away from his agency job to take on work as a freelance photographer and cinematographer. At his loft studio on 3rd Avenue and 33rd Street, just below the dance studio of Merce Cunningham, he took on assignments for a wide range of clients, including Children’s Vogue, Charles Jourdan and Marlboro. As a cameraman, Ancona shot documentaries around the world, and did several early segments for Sesame Street, Big Blue Marble and other children's programs. In 1966 Ancona produced and directed a short film of artist Paul Hultberg, Reflections: the imagery of Paul Hultberg enamelist, that won a Cine Golden Eagle Award in 1967.

From 1962 to 1970, Ancona moved his family to the Gate Hill Cooperative in Stony Point, NY, where they lived alongside multidisciplinary artists including John Cage, David Tudor, M.C. Richards and Stan Vanderbeek. The Ancona family moved into the home originally built by Paul Hultberg and occupied by the Hultberg family from 1956 to 1962. In 1989, Ancona and his family moved to Santa Fe, NM, where they immersed themselves in the city's culture and Spanish roots. He expanded his photography practice and was an active member of the arts community, garnering recognition from the New Mexico Book Association and received the City of Santa Fe Mayor's Award for Excellence in the Arts in 2014.

== Bibliography ==
- Monsters on Wheels, E. P. Dutton, 1974
- I Feel, E.P. Dutton, 1977
- Growing Older, E. P. Dutton, 1978
- Turtle Watch, Macmillan Publishing Company, 1990
- Powwow, Harcourt Brace & Company, 1993
- Pablo Remembers: The Fiesta of the Day of the Dead, Lothrop, Lee & Shepard/HarperCollins, 1993
- The Piñata Maker, Harcourt Brace & Company, 1994
- The Golden Lion Tamarin Comes Home, Macmillan/Simon & Schuster, 1994
- Earth Daughter, Simon & Schuster, 1995
- Mayeros: A Yucatec Maya Family, Lothrop, Lee & Shepard/HarperCollins, 1997
- Barrio: José’s Neighborhood, Harcourt Brace & Company, 1998
- Murals: Walls That Sing, Marshall Cavendish, 2003
- It’s Our Garden: From Seeds to Harvest in a School Garden, Candlewick Press, 2013
- Can We Help? Kids Volunteering to Help Their Communities, Candlewick Press, 2015

== Bibliographical Resources ==
https://faculty.ucmerced.edu/mmartin-rodriguez/index_files/vhAnconaGeorge.htm

== Select awards and honors ==
- 1967, Cine Golden Eagle Award for the film, Reflections: the imagery of Paul Hultberg enamelist
- 1974, AIGA Best Children's Science Book Award, Monsters on Wheels
- 1978, Babbling Bookworm Fabulous Book Award, Growing Older
- 1978, N.Y. Art Directors Club Award, I Feel
- 1988, New York Academy of Sciences for Children's Science Book Award, Turtle Watch
- 1993, New York Public Library Children's Book List 100 Titles, Powwow
- 1994, Parents Choice, Texas Library Association Blue Bonnet Award, The Piñata Maker
- 1994, Outstanding Science Trade Book for Children, The Golden Lion Tamarin Comes Home
- 1995, National Science Teachers Association & Children's Book Council, The Golden Lion Tamarin Comes Home
- 1995, American Booksellers Association Pick of the List, Earth Daughter
- 1997, Children's Book Council, Notable Children's Books in Social Studies, Mayeros
- 2000, Pura Belpré Honor Book, Barrio
- 2003, Americas Award Commended Book, Murals
- 2014, Mayor's Awards for Excellence in the Arts, City of Santa Fe Arts Commission
- 2014, AAAS/Subaru Science Books and Films Prize for Excellence in Science Books, It's Our Garden
- 2014, International Latino Book Awards: Best Children's Nonfiction Picture Book category, It's Our Garden
- 2016/17, Carol D. Reiser Children's Book Award, Can We Help?, The Corporate Volunteer Council of Atlanta
- 1996, Pura Belpré Honor Book, Pablo Remembers
