= Tina Escaja =

Spanish-American poet, media artist and professor (born 1965)

- Tina Escaja at the X Congreso Internacional de la Lengua Española, (CILE), October 2025
- Born: 1965 (age 60–61); Zamora, Spain
- Education: University of Pennsylvania (Ph.D.); Universitat de Barcelona (Licenciatura)
- Occupations: Writer, Media artist, Professor
- Notable work: Caída libre, VeloCity”, Código de barras, Negro en ovejas, Emblem/as”, Manual Destructivista”, Mar y Virus”, “Realidad Mitigada”.
- Website: proyecto.w3.uvm.edu//

Tina Escaja (born 1965 in Zamora, Spain), also known as Alm@ Pérez, is a Spanish-American writer, activist, feminist scholar and digital artist based in Burlington, Vermont. She is a Distinguished Professor of Romance Languages and Gender & Women's Studies, and the Director of the Gender, Sexuality and Women's Studies Program at the University of Vermont. She is the winner of the International Poetry Prize Dulce María Loynaz, and the National Latino Poetry Award for Young Adults, Isabel Campoy-Alma Flor Ada. She is considered a pioneer in the field of electronic literature in Spanish. She is a full member of the North American Academy of the Spanish Language (ANLE), and Corresponding member of the Royal Spanish Academy (RAE).

== Life ==
She has earned degrees from the University of Barcelona and the University of Pennsylvania. She served as President of Feministas Unidas, Inc., President of ALDEEU (Spanish Professionals in America), and President of AEGS (Association of Gender and Sexuality Studies).

== Critical reception ==
Her creative work has been defined as a crossover between literary writing, digital art, video and multimedia projects.

In the year 2000 she published the hypertextual poem VeloCity, considered a pioneer in the field of digital poetry in Spanish, and one of "the first hypertextual works written by women."

According to scholars and media critics María Goicoechea and Laura Sánchez, "Hypertext is, for Tina Escaja, the insignia of this new cyberfeminism that proposes a ‘non-essential modern subject’." The same critics note a change in this perception in Escaja's project Código de barras, a project based on barcode technology: “now technology is used to compel us to think about a perturbing reality of control and dominion.”

Media critic Maya Zalbidea sees in her interactive hypertextual novel Pinzas de metal an example of electronic Cut-up technique, and also states that "the multilinearity of the story provides the reader a feeling of intrigue and bewilderment."

Regarding her award-winning poetry collection Caída libre, the writer and critic Sabas Martín finds connections with the innovating poetry of César Vallejo, and the images created by Federico García Lorca and Gabriela Mistral.

Her work has been featured at Ciberfeminismos, tecnotextualidades y transgéneros. Literatura digital en español escrita por mujeres. Isabel Navas Ocaña and Dolores Romero Eds. Universidad Complutense, 2023 and Voces encendidas. Mujeres, arte y tecnología. María Goicoechea y Laura Sánchez (ed.) Madrid, Consejo Superior de Investigaciones Científicas, 2023

Her 2025 work, Realidad mitigada (2025) has a prologue by Élika Ortega; AR by Alejandro Romero; 3D by Lara Marín and Damián Antuña; Layout by María Vega. The Electronic Book Review reviewed this work in October 2026, explaining the subtle differences between mitigated reality and virtual reality.

== Selected exhibitions and anthologies ==
Escaja's poetry and digital works have been exhibited in museums and galleries such as the Museum Wolf Vostell Malpartida de Cáceres (Spain); Centro Cultural Okendo (San Sebastián, Spain);the BCA Center, the Flynndog Gallery, and the Art Hop in Burlington, Vermont; the Galerie du Centre de Design (Université du Québec à Montréal);Matadero Madrid, Madrid, Spain; Museo Provincial de Lugo, (Spain) the Lewis Glucksman Gallery, and the Mission District Cultural Center for Latino Arts, San Francisco.

Her work has been translated into six languages, and has been included in anthologies such as the Electronic Literature Collection, Volume 3;Escenario de crisis: dramaturgas españolas del nuevo milenio;Tasting Asia: An Anthology of Poems of the 2016 Taipei Poetry Festival;Dos Poemas y un Café: Mujeres poetas visuales II;L'altra Penelope: Antologia di scrittrici di lingua spagnola;Escritores españoles en Estados Unidos;The Americas Poetry Festival of New York 2015;Pegasos de dos siglos: Poesía en Kentucky 1977-2007;Que no cesen rumores. Antología poética;Trilogía Poética de las mujeres en Hispanoamérica (Pícaras, místicas y rebeldes); and The WRUV Reader. A Vermont Writers’Anthology;

== Poetry collections ==
- La odisea marina de María Traviesa (2017) Isabel Campoy-Alma Flor Ada Award 2017. ISBN 9780997942361
- Manual destructivista/Destructivist Manual (2016) ISBN 9781940075433 Translations by Kristin Dykstra.
- Caída libre/Free Fall (2015) Translations by Mark Eisner. Prologues by María Victoria Atencia & Li Kuei-Hsien ISBN 9781937677831
- Respiración mecánica / Respiració mecànica / Hats hartze mekanikoa & VeloCity (2014) Translations by María Cinta Montagut (Catalan), Mariña Pérez Rei (Galician) and Itxaro Borda (Basque). Prologue by Marta Segarra ISBN 9788498885736
- 13 Lunas 13 (2011) Prologue by Jill Robbins. ISBN 9788478394845
- Código de barras (2007) Prologue by Concha García & Sharon Keefe-Ugalde. ISBN 9788496482418
- Caída libre (Second edition, 2007) Prologue by María Victoria Atencia. ISBN 9789709894257
- Caída Libre (2004) Dulce María Loynaz Award 2004. ISBN 8479473665
- Respiración mecánica (Badosa EP, 2001)

== Electronic works ==
- Realidad Mitagada, 2025 (Mitigated Reality) uses Augmented Reality (AR) to showcase poetry based on alchemy, robotics, and COVID-19.
- "CAPTCHA Poem@". thenewriver.us. 2021.
- "Robopoem@s". thenewriver.us. 2020.
- “Mar y Virus / Virus and the Sea.” Messages from the Anthropocene. Flynndog Gallery, Burlington, VT. November 2020-June 2021.
- Pinzas de metal. “Afterflash: Showcasing Flash Fiction, Poetry, and Essays from The NEXT.” Collective digital exhibition curated by Dene Grigar, Electronic Literature Lab. January, 2021.
- “According to your likeness / my Image.” University of Central Florida Art Gallery, Orlando, July 2020.
- "Emblem/as". collection.eliterature.org/4. 2017–2019. Also shown in The Glucksman Museum. Cork, Ireland, July 11–17, 2019.
- "Mora amor". Elmcip.net. 2017.
- "Robopoem@s". Elmcip.net. 2016.
- "Negro en ovejas (poema ovino)". proyecto.w3.uvm.edu. 2011.
- "Código de barras". researchgate.net. 2006.
- "Pinzas de metal". Elmcip.net. 2003.
- "VeloCity". Elmcip.net. 2000.

== Fiction ==
- Asesinato en el laboratorio de idiomas / Murder in the Language Lab (2016) English Translation by John W. Warren. ISBN 9780997942323
- "Bola luna" International Prize ‘Ana María Matute’ (finalist). (1995) ISBN 8478391622

== Theater ==
- De tripas corazón. 2019.
- Madres, 2007. ISBN 9788496790360

== Other works ==
- Por un lenguaje inclusivo: Estudios y reflexiones sobre estrategias no sexistas en la lengua española. Co-ed with Natalia Prunes. ANLE, 2021.
- Resistencia: Poems of Protest and Revolution. Co-ed with Mark Eisner. Introduction by Julia Alvarez. Tin House, 2020. ISBN 978-1-951142-07-0
- Diáspora Española: Migración y exilios. Actas seleccionadas de la XXXVII Asamblea General y Congreso Internacional de ALDEEU. Co-ed with Marta Boris Tarré. Lakeville, MA: ALDEEU, 2020. ISBN Nueva York en español: Intersecciones hispánicas en EEUU. Actas seleccionadas del XXXVI
- Congreso Internacional de ALDEEU, Co-ed with Marta Boris Tarré. Lakeville, MA: ALDEEU, 2017. ISBN 978-0-692-87378-6
