= Graciela Contreras =

Chilean politician

Mayor of Santiago
- In office 6 January 1939 – 19 March 1940
- Preceded by: Onofre Lillo Astorquiza
- Succeeded by: Rafael Pacheco Sty

Personal details
- Born: Graciela Contreras Barrenechea; 1895
- Died: 1974 (aged 78–79)
- Party: Socialist Party of Chile
- Spouse: Óscar Schnake
- Occupation: Politician

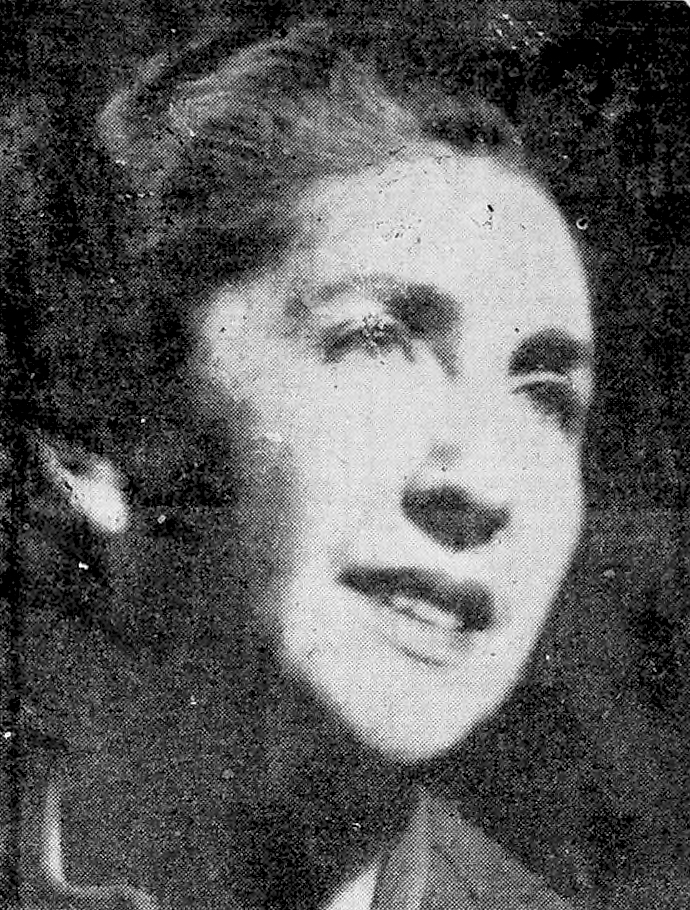

Graciela Contreras Barrenechea (1895–1974), also known as Graciela Contreras de Schnake, was a Chilean politician. She was the mayor of Santiago from 1939 to 1940, becoming the first woman to hold the office.

== Biography ==
Born in Santiago in 1895, Graciela Contreras was the daughter of José María Contreras Vergara and Tránsito Barrenechea Naranjo. On the maternal side, she was the niece of doctor and politician Manuel J. Barrenechea Naranjo, and was also the cousin of the father of writer and politician Julio Barrenechea. In 1923 she married Óscar Schnake and they had two children. The couple later divorced. Contreras was a member of the Socialist Party of Chile (PS) since its founding in 1933, specializing in the area of Social Women's Action.

Contreras was appointed mayor of the commune of Santiago by President Pedro Aguirre Cerda, her nomination being supported by the Pro-Emancipation Movement of Chilean Women (MEMCH), a position she assumed on 6 January 1939. With this, she became the first mayor of Santiago – after her, only three women have held that position: María Teresa del Canto (1953–1957), María Eugenia Oyarzún (1975–1976), and Carolina Tohá (2012–2016). She was the second woman to take office as mayor in Chile after Alicia Cañas, and was the only woman mayor of a national capital in the Americas at the time.

She served as mayor until 19 March 1940. During her term she coordinated relief efforts after the Chillán earthquake, expanded playgrounds and sports programs in working-class neighborhoods, opened a hostel for shoeshiners, and was a delegate to the Inter-American Commission of Women, working to increase civil and political rights for women.
