= Carolina Tohá =

Chilean politician (born 1965)

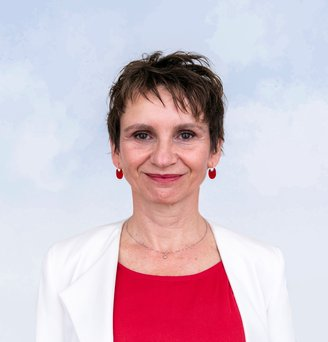
- Tohá in 2022

Minister of the Interior and Public Security
- In office 6 September 2022 – 4 March 2025
- President: Gabriel Boric
- Preceded by: Izkia Siches
- Succeeded by: Álvaro Elizalde

Mayor of Santiago
- In office 6 December 2012 – 6 December 2016
- Preceded by: Pablo Zalaquett
- Succeeded by: Felipe Alessandri

President of the Party for Democracy
- In office 15 May 2010 – 11 June 2012
- Preceded by: Adriana Muñoz D'Albora
- Succeeded by: Jaime Quintana

Ministry Secretary General of Government
- In office 12 March 2009 – 14 December 2009
- President: Michelle Bachelet
- Preceded by: Francisco Vidal Salinas
- Succeeded by: Pilar Armanet

Personal details
- Born: Carolina Montserrat Tohá Morales; 12 May 1965 (age 61) Santiago, Chile
- Party: Party for Democracy (PPD)
- Spouse(s): Nolberto Salinas (divorced); Fulvio Rossi (2005–2010); Jaime Madariaga (2011–present)
- Education: University of Chile; University of Milan

Carolina Montserrat Tohá Morales (born 12 May 1965) is a Chilean politician and political scientist. She served as Minister of the Interior and Public Security from 2022 to 2025 under President Gabriel Boric. A founding member of the Party for Democracy (PPD), she was the first woman to serve as Minister Secretary General of Government (2009) and also the first woman elected president of the PPD (2010–2012). Tohá was a member of the Chamber of Deputies from 2002 to 2009 and later became the first woman elected mayor of Santiago by popular vote, holding office from 2012 to 2016.

In March 2025, she stepped down from her ministerial position to run as a candidate in that year's presidential election. After finishing second in the Unity for Chile primary, she announced that she would step back from frontline politics.

The daughter of former Interior Minister José Tohá, who was killed during the Pinochet dictatorship, she was forced into exile as a child. She rose to prominence in student politics during the 1980s, becoming a nationally known figure during Chile's return to democracy. She later earned a degree in Political Science from the University of Milan. In addition to her political roles, she has worked as a consultant and academic.

== Early life ==
Tohá was born on May 12, 1965, in Santiago, Chile. She is the daughter of José Tohá González, a lawyer, journalist, and socialist politician who served as Minister of the Interior and Minister of National Defense under President Salvador Allende. In 1974, following his arrest and torture six months after the military coup led by General Augusto Pinochet, her father was killed while in custody. Her mother is Victoria Morales Etchevers, also known as Moy de Tohá.

Tohá began her primary education at Simón Bolívar School No. 120 in Santiago. After the overthrow of the Popular Unity government, her schooling was interrupted, and she was only able to take exams at the end of 1973. A few weeks after her father's death, her family went into self-exile in Mexico, where they remained for five years. Upon returning to Chile in 1979, she continued her secondary education at Francisco de Miranda School. One of her teachers there was Jaime Gazmuri, then operating in clandestinity, who would later become a senator.

She began studying law at the University of Chile between 1984 and 1989, although she did not complete the degree. During this time, she became actively involved in student politics and emerged as one of the most prominent student leaders opposing the Pinochet dictatorship. She served as vice president of the University of Chile Student Federation (FECh) from 1986 to 1988, and alongside then-president Germán Quintana, led the university strike that resulted in the resignation of appointed rector José Luis Federici—a landmark achievement for the student movement.

In 1989, Tohá moved to Italy, where she earned the Italian degree of Dottore in Scienze Politiche (Note: The Italian title Dottore in Scienze Politiche was the standard university degree (laurea) awarded under Italy's pre-Bologna higher education system and is not equivalent to a research doctorate (PhD or Dottorato di ricerca).) from the University of Milan in 1994. She returned to Chile the following year and worked as an independent consultant in public management and social policy. She also taught in postgraduate programs at the University of Chile's School of Engineering and at Alberto Hurtado University. Additionally, she served as an advisor to the Ministry of Finance, executive secretary of the Social Interministerial Committee, consultant on public sector management, and held a position in the Office of the Undersecretary of the Interior.

== Political career ==
=== Founder of the PPD and the Concertación governments (1987-2001) ===
In 1987, Tohá joined Ricardo Lagos and Jorge Schaulsohn in founding the Party for Democracy (PPD), emerging as one of the key young leaders of the new political organization.

After completing her studies in Europe, Tohá returned to Chile and was appointed executive secretary of the Social Ministers Committee under President Eduardo Frei Ruiz-Tagle, serving from 1995 to 1997. That year, she ran for a seat in the Chamber of Deputies representing the Santiago electoral district but was unsuccessful, losing to fellow PPD member Enrique Krauss and right-wing candidate Alberto Cardemil.

She later became vice president of the PPD and played an active role in Ricardo Lagos's 1999 presidential campaign. Following Lagos's victory over Joaquín Lavín in January 2000, she was appointed Undersecretary General of Government, a role she held from March 11, 2000, until her resignation on May 23, 2001, to pursue a congressional seat.

=== Deputy for Santiago (2002-2009) ===
In the December 2001 parliamentary elections, Tohá was elected deputy for District No. 22, which included the commune of Santiago, for the 2002–2006 legislative term. She took office on March 11, 2002, and served on the Standing Committees on Economy; Education, Culture, Sports and Recreation; and Internal Government, as well as the Special Committee on Youth.

Re-elected in the 2005 elections with the highest share of votes in her district (39.79%), she continued to represent District No. 22 during the 2006–2010 term. During this period, she was a member of the Standing Committees on Internal Government and Education, and also served on the Special Committees on Freedom of Expression and the Media, and on Inequality and Poverty. In addition, she was an active member of the PPD parliamentary committee.

=== Government spokeswoman and PPD president (2009-2012) ===
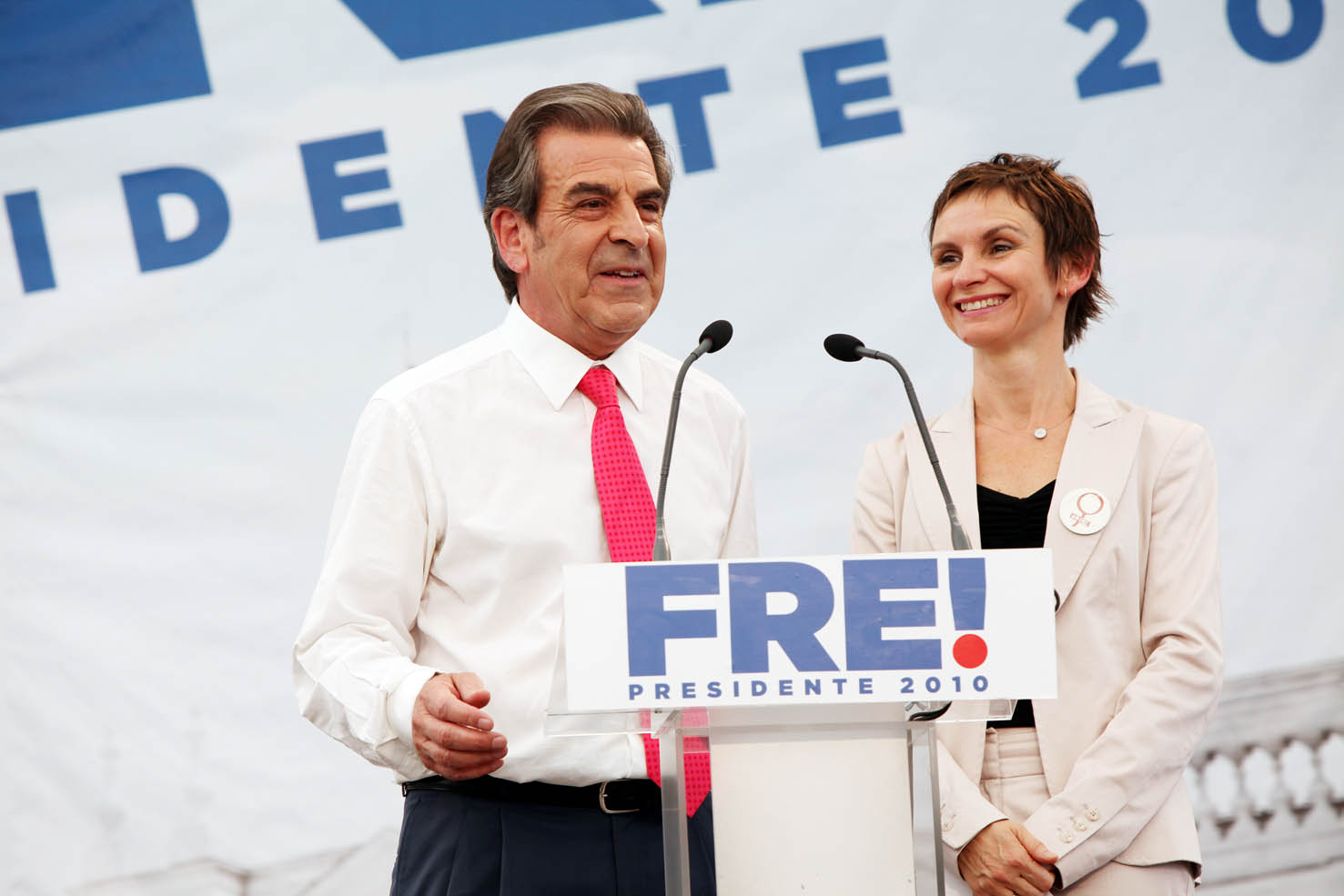
Tohá being presented as chief of Eduardo Frei Ruiz-Tagle's presidential run-off campaign, 2009

On March 12, 2009, Tohá was appointed Minister Secretary General of the Government by President Michelle Bachelet, making her the first woman to hold this position in Chilean history. In this role, she served as the government's official spokesperson, responsible for communicating the administration's policies and positions to the public and the media. This appointment required her to resign from her seat in the Chamber of Deputies, as the roles were incompatible during peacetime. She was succeeded by fellow PPD member Felipe Harboe.

Later that year, Tohá led the campaign of Eduardo Frei Ruiz-Tagle in his unsuccessful bid to reclaim the presidency, which was won by businessman Sebastián Piñera, the candidate of the center-right Alianza coalition.

On May 25, 2010, Tohá was elected president of the PPD, following a collaborative agreement with deputy Pepe Auth to launch a candidacy that had broad party approval. She held this position until June 2012.

=== Mayor of Santiago (2012-2016) ===
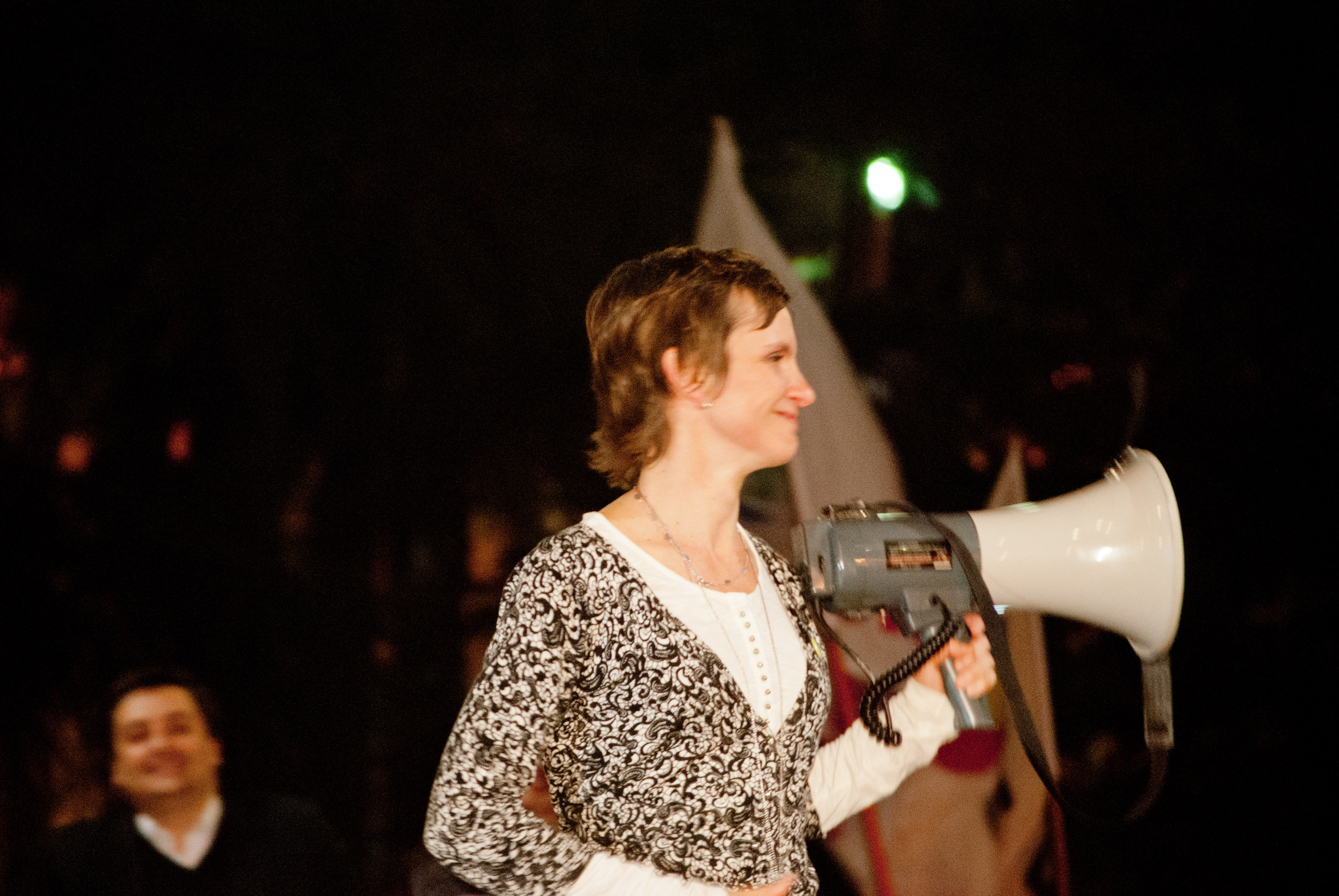
Tohá holding a bullhorn while celebrating after being elected mayor of Santiago, 2012

Tohá ran for the center-left Concertación's candidacy for mayor of Santiago in the municipal primaries on April 1, 2012, where she won with more than 67% of the vote. In the municipal elections later that year, she secured 50.60% of the vote, regaining the Santiago municipality for her coalition after twelve years of Alliance dominance.

She was sworn in as mayor of Santiago on December 6, 2012, becoming the first woman elected to this position by popular vote. Her three predecessors—Graciela Contreras (1939–1940), María Teresa del Canto (1953–1957), and María Eugenia Oyarzún (1975–1976)—were appointed by the respective presidents: Pedro Aguirre Cerda, Carlos Ibáñez del Campo, and Augusto Pinochet.

In October 2014, Tohá initiated a citizen consultation focused on issues related to the safety and cleanliness of the city. She sought re-election in the 2016 municipal elections but was defeated by Felipe Alessandri, handing over the position on December 6, 2016.

=== Political hiatus (2016-2022) ===
After her defeat in the mayoral race, Tohá took a break from active politics. In 2017, she founded the City Institute and served as its president. She also lectured in the University of Chile's Master's program in Urbanism and worked as a consultant for the SUR Corporation from 2017 to 2018. Additionally, she provided political analysis for Tele13 Radio.

=== Minister of Interior and Public Security (2022-2025) ===
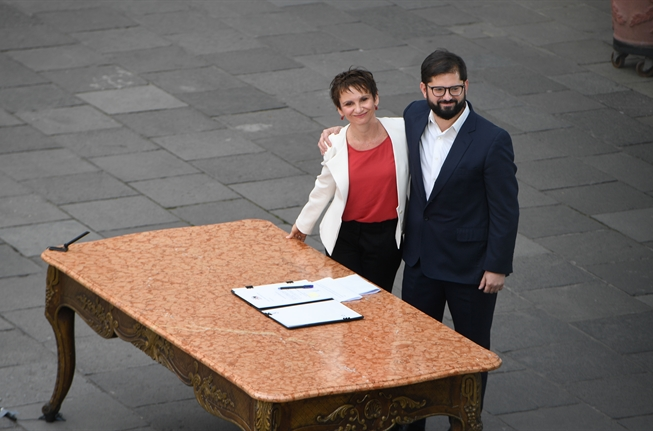
Carolina Tohá taking oath as Minister of the Interior and Public Security, alongside President Gabriel Boric on 6 September 2022

On September 6, 2022, President Gabriel Boric appointed Tohá as Minister of the Interior and Public Security, following his first cabinet reshuffle. She succeeded Izkia Siches, becoming the second woman to hold this position, after Siches, and the second woman to serve as Vice President of the Republic (also following Siches) between September 19 and 23, when President Boric attended the 77th session of the United Nations General Assembly.

=== Presidential campaign (2025) ===
On March 4, 2025, Tohá resigned from her ministerial position to launch her presidential campaign. After finishing second in the Unity for Chile primary, she announced that she would step back from frontline politics.

== Controversies ==
=== Mayorship ===
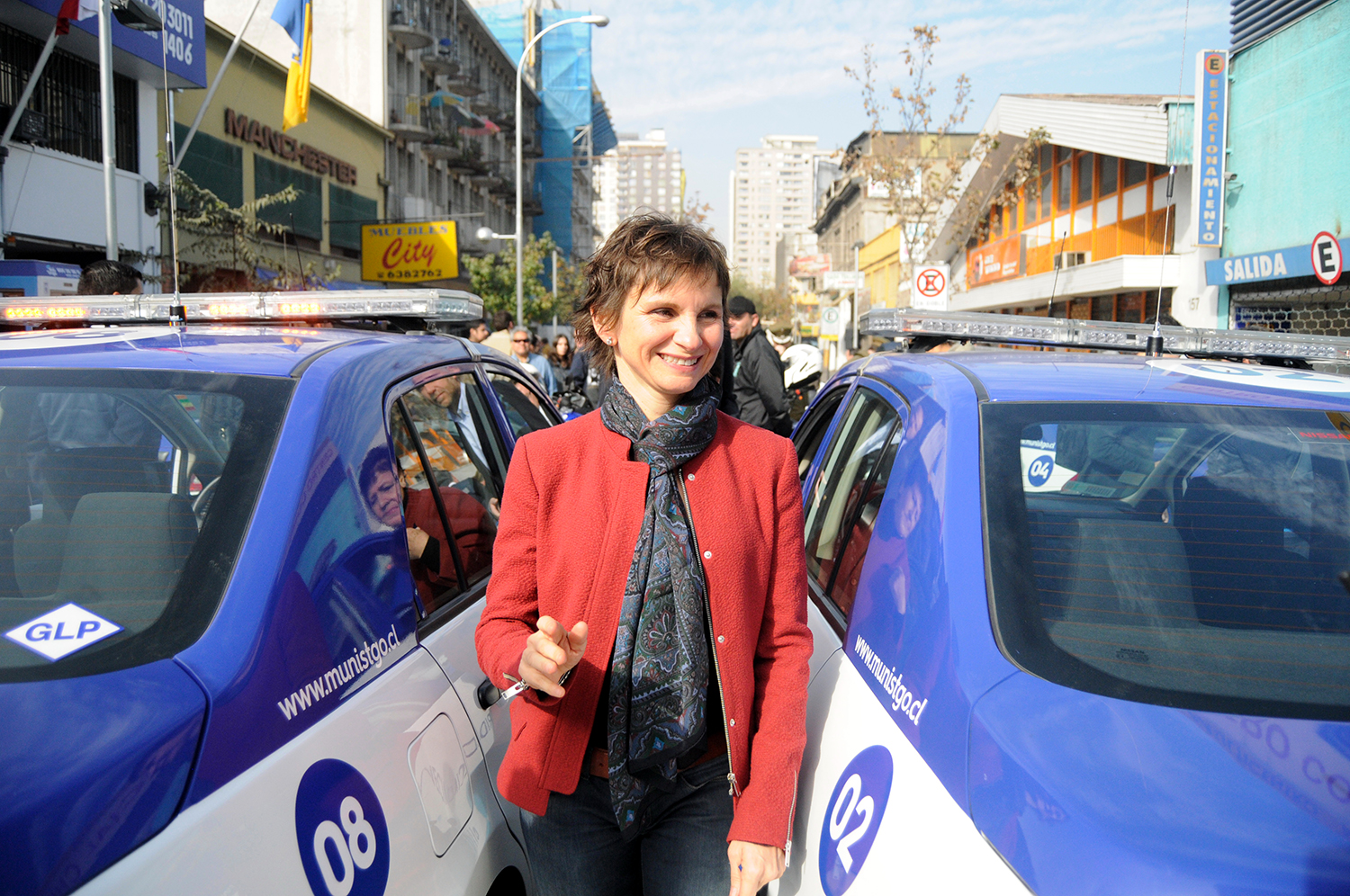
Tohá standing between two municipal security patrol cars while mayor in 2014

On May 27, 2014, a fire broke out in the storage facilities of the National Institute municipal high school, which was controlled by five fire companies. As the school administrator, Tohá faced significant criticism from parents and guardians, as the fire reportedly occurred following her decision to allow student occupations within the school. On July 31 of the same year, a group of parents and guardians filed a protection order against her, seeking to prevent the municipality from supporting the occupations. They argued that her decision violated the students' right to education. The Santiago Court of Appeals granted the order on August 18.

Later, in September 2014, during the national holidays, the municipality decided to charge an entrance fee to O'Higgins Park, which hosts fairs and the traditional military parade. While the decision was unpopular among fairground workers, it was generally well-received by visitors due to increased security measures.

On November 16, 2014, Chilean police carried out a controversial eviction of flea market vendors in Parque Forestal. The eviction, requested by Tohá, was carried out due to vendors' failure to comply with an agreement that allowed them to operate only one weekend per month.

=== SQM case ===
In May 2016, the Public Prosecutor's Office initiated an investigation into irregular financing of the PPD party by Sociedad Química y Minera de Chile (SQM) during Tohá's tenure as party president. The investigation focused on invoices issued by Chile Ambiente and the Innovation and Democracy Foundation. While Tohá stated that she did not have a direct connection to the payments, she acknowledged her political responsibility for the situation.

== Personal life ==
Tohá has two children, Emilio and Matilde, with lawyer and Party for Democracy (PPD) activist Norberto Salinas. In December 2005, she married physician and politician Fulvio Rossi, from whom she is now separated. She later began a relationship with lawyer Jaime Madariaga, a specialist in Mapuche issues. Since 2022, she has been in a relationship with economist and former Minister of Finance Mario Marcel, with whom she had worked for decades in public administration; the two first met in the 1990s when Marcel hired her at the Budget Directorate (Dipres). Tohá publicly confirmed the relationship in May 2025, after launching her presidential candidacy, stating that it had developed gradually since her first year as Interior Minister and that both she and Marcel had informed President Gabriel Boric of it early on.

== Media recognition ==
On November 30, 2022, in her capacity as Minister of the Interior and Public Security, Tohá was named one of the "100 Women Leaders" in Chile. This recognition, awarded by the organization Mujeres Empresarias and El Mercurio newspaper, celebrates women who have made significant contributions in various fields, including economics, education, and public service.

== Notes ==
Preceded by Izkia Siches	Minister of the Interior and Public Security; 2022–	Succeeded by
Preceded by Francisco Vidal Salinas	Minister Secretary General of Government; 2009	Succeeded by Pilar Armanet
