= Alice Schertle =

American author

- Born: 1941 (age 84–85); Los Angeles, California, U.S.
- Occupation: Author
- Writing career
- Genre: Children's picture books
- Website: www.aliceschertle.com

Alice Schertle (born 1941) is an American poet, teacher, and author from Los Angeles. She is known as the author of numerous children's books, most notably the New York Times best-selling Little Blue Truck series.

== Personal life ==
Schertle was born in 1941 in Los Angeles, California. She attended the University of Southern California and the University of California, Los Angeles.

== Career ==
Schertle worked for a time as an elementary school teacher. As a children's book author, her works "explore themes of nature and language, often with playful use of rhyme."

Schertle has also published several collections of poetry.

She has won a number of honors, including the 2010 Lee Bennett Hopkins Poetry Award and the Christopher Award.

=== Little Blue Truck ===
Schertle collaborated with illustrator Jill McElmurry to create Little Blue Truck, a friendly pick-up truck with a variety of animal friends. The first book, Little Blue Truck, was published in 2008. A starred review in Publishers Weekly noted that Shertle's "rhyming stanzas are succinct, and she gives readers plenty of opportunities to chime in with animal and vehicle noises."

After McElmurry's death in 2017, her estate gave permission for others to continue the books in her style. For instance, Good Night, Little Blue Truck (2019) lists Schertle's and McElmurry's names on the front cover, while text inside the book notes that it is "Illustrated by John Joseph in the style of Jill McElmurry."

== Works ==
=== The Little Blue Truck series ===
Illustrated by Jill McElmurry

- Little Blue Truck (2008)
- Little Blue Truck Leads the Way (2009)
- Little Blue Truck's Christmas (2014)
- Little Blue Truck's Halloween (2016)
- Little Blue Truck's Springtime (2018)
- Good Night, Little Blue Truck (2019)
- Little Blue Truck's Valentine (2020)
- Time for School, Little Blue Truck (2021)
- Little Blue Truck Makes a Friend (2022)
- Little Blue Truck's Beep Along Book (2023)
- Little Blue Truck Feeling Happy (2024)
- Little Blue Truck and Racer Red (2025)

=== The All You Need... series ===
Illustrated by Barbara Lavallee

- All You Need for a Snowman
- All You Need for a Beach

=== The Jeremy Bean series ===
- Look Out, Jeremy Bean!
- Jeremy Bean's St. Patrick's Day

=== Other titles ===
- The April Fool (1981)
- William and Grandpa (1989), illustrated by Lydia Dabcovich
- How Now, Brown Cow? (1994), illustrated by Amanda Schaffer
- Advice for a Frog (1995)
- Keepers (1996)
- I Am the Cat (1999), illustrated by Mark Buehner
- Down the Road (2000), illustrated by E. B. Lewis
- When the Moon is High (2003)
- 1, 2, I Love You (2004), illustrated by Emily Arnold McCully
- We (2007) illustrated by Kenneth Addison
- Very Hairy Bear (2007), illustrated by Matt Phelan
- Button Up! (2009), illustrated by Petra Mathers
- Such a Little Mouse (2015), illustrated by Stephanie Yue
- ¡Pío Peep! Traditional Spanish Nursery Rhymes (2019) – English adaptations of selections by Alma Flor Ada and Isabel Campoy
- Cathy and Company series (with Cathy Pavia)
- The Skeleton in the Closet (illustrated by Curtis Jobling)
- Teddy Bear, Teddy Bear (illustrated by Linda Hill Griffith)
- A Lucky Thing (illustrated by Wendell Minor)
- An Anaconda Ate My Homework! (illustrated by Aaron Renier)
- Good Night, Hattie, My Dearie, My Dove
- Witch Hazel (illustrated by Margot Tomes)
- The Adventures of Old Bo Bear (illustrated by David Parkins)
- Maisie (illustrated by Lydia Dabcovich)
- Bill and the Google-Eyed Goblins (illustrated by Patricia Coombs)
- That Olive! (illustrated by Cindy Wheeler)
