= Suni Paz =

Argentine singer, songwriter, musician and educator

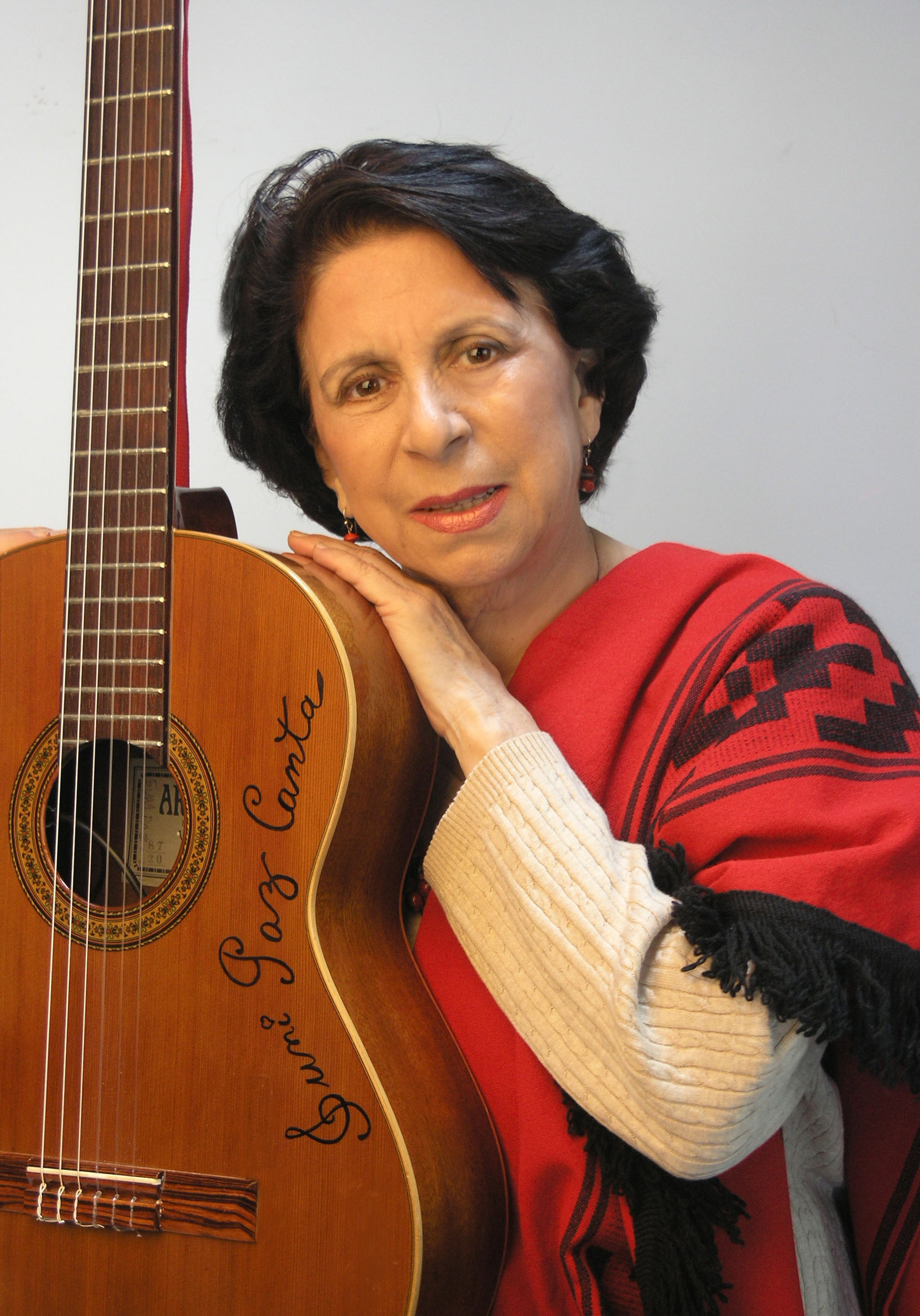
Paz in 2009

Suni Paz is an Argentinian singer, songwriter, guitarist, poet, folklorist, translator, and teacher, who has recorded and been published extensively. Paz is part of the progressive Latin American music movement known as nueva canción (new song).

Paz is known in the United States as a performing artist and songwriter, and has been presenting Latin American culture to audiences for more than thirty years. In addition to eight CDs on the Smithsonian Folkways label, she has recorded more than four hundred songs for children and performed alongside Arlo Guthrie, Pete Seeger, Guy Carawan and Phil Ochs.

== Biography ==
Born into a talented Argentine Italian-Catalan family of writers, musicians, linguists and poets, Paz started playing the guitar, writing songs, singing in choirs, and at family parties at age 12. From 1960 to 1963 she lived in Chile. From 1963 to 1965 she raised her two children alone, making a living by writing and singing advertising jingles for various companies and becoming a copywriter trainee for McCann Erickson-Chile.

In 1967, Paz moved to California with her two children. There, she designed curriculum for elementary schools presenting Latin American culture through songs, stories and dances. She studied voice, began her studies towards a BA in Sociology and Literature, remarried, got a school district permit to perform in the schools in Los Angeles and Oakland, and thus began her teaching and singing career in the United States.

Influenced by the Nueva canción movement, Paz began writing songs in folk styles with lyrics that addressed the poverty and inequality in Latin America.

In 1977, Paz completed an MA from Rutgers University and a teaching credential, and taught in New York City. Paz has two sons whom she enjoys involving in her recordings. Her eldest, Juan, played keyboard on several of her albums. Her youngest, Ramiro Fauve, a singer-songwriter and outstanding artist continues to create music with her. Paz currently splits time between Nevada and Los Angeles, California.

== Name and mission ==
Suni Paz chose the name "Suni" because it means "ever-lasting" in the Quechua language. "Paz" which means "peace" is a last name found in every Latin American country. To find inner peace and share it with others is Paz's quest in life. Her mission is to use her singing and playing to disseminate the rich cultures of the Americas through the lyrics, rhythms, and indigenous instruments such as the charango, caja, and bombo, thereby building a bridge between cultures.

== Creative works ==
Paz began writing her own lyrics and setting to music some of her concerns in order to give a voice to the silent and forgotten ones. She has sung in communities, schools, at rallies and marches, and later at colleges, universities, and festivals in the United States, Latin America and Europe.

In the sixties, having settled in New York, Paz began recording. Her first album, Breaking Out of the Silence/Brotando del Silencio was released in 1973 on Paredon Records, a label founded by Irwin Silber and Barbara Dane to present social protest music. In 1977, Paz recorded her first album with Folkways Records, Entre Hermanas: Between Sisters-Women's Songs Sung in Spanish, widening the implications of the women's movement beyond middle- and upper-class Americans.

In the late seventies, Moe Asch from Folkways Records commissioned three children's albums including Alerta, Children Songs for the Playground and From the Sky of My Childhood which Paz recorded accompanied by noted cellist Martha Siegel. The three albums solidified Paz's voice as a singer-songwriter of children's songs. The albums became pivotal in Paz's career as an educator and a musician using songs to teach about all subjects and about life.

In 1984, Paz met Dr. Alma Flor Ada, a renowned writer and poet of children's stories, living and working in San Francisco. Ada was interested in having her lyrics set to music and recorded by Paz. Together with Viví Escrivá, an illustrator living in Spain, Ada's lyrics and Paz's music, a trio of creativity across two continents became established. In 1997, Paz met poet and writer Francisca Isabel Campoy who writes children's books on Latin America and Spain with Ada. The trio became a quartet. Paz then began writing music, recording and performing Ada's and Campoy's lyrics and stories which they now present together in conferences on education in the United States and Latin America. Thus, Paz continues today with her career as an author, lyricist, singer, songwriter, recording artist, and performer of folklore and children's songs. She has just published her own collection of short stories and anecdotes about growing up in Argentina and has an upcoming release about her life in Chile.

In 2007 Paz recorded a new Smithsonian Folkways CD Bandera Mía featuring stirring folk songs from Argentina.

Also in 2007 Paz published a collection of autobiographical stories in English and Spanish entitled Sparkles & Shadows - from Innocence to Wisdom (Destellos y Sombras de la Inoncencia a la Madurez in Spanish) published by Del Sol Books.

In 2008 Paz was featured in Worlds of Sound: The Story of Smithsonian Folkways, by Richard Carlin.

== Concerts ==
On June 9, 1975, Paz performed at a benefit for Sing Out! magazine at The Bottom Line, sharing the stage with Don Mclean, Abby Newton, Louisiana Red, Phil Ochs, Charley Sales, Leon Rossebson, Sara Cleveland and the Red Clay Ramblers.

== Awards and honors ==
In 2020, the National Endowment for the Arts awarded Paz a National Heritage Fellowship, the nation's highest honor in the folk and traditional arts. The NEA described Paz as "One of the first artists to bring the nueva canción tradition—the 'new song' music of the 1960s and 1970s—to North American audiences, Paz's work as an American songwriter and performer of Latin American folk music has resonated as a cultural force engaging people of all backgrounds and ages."

In 2003, The Children's Music Network bestowed the Magic Penny Award on Paz, for her outstanding lifetime contribution to children's music.

== Discography ==
Cantos de Las Posadas and Other Christmas Songs (recorded by Elena Paz and Carlos Garcia Travesi), 1963, Folkways Records

Brotando del Silencio - Breaking Out of the Silence, 1973, Paredon Records

Entre Hermanas: Between Sisters: Women's Songs in Spanish Sung by Suni Paz, 1977, Folkways

From the Sky of My Childhood / Del Cielo de Mi Ninez - Folk Songs from Latin America sung by Suni Paz, 1979, Folkways

Earth and Ocean Songs: Canciones del Mar y de la Tierra, 1982, Folkways

Hagamos Camimos: Andamos Student, 1986, Addison-Wesley

Brotes Sobre el Papel: Buds on Paper, 1987, Suni Paz

La Pajara Pinta, 1988, Santillana Publishing

Manana es Domingo, 1988, Santillana

Estaba la Pastora, 1988, Santillana

Las Semillas Magicas, 1988, Santillana

La Bella Durmiente, 1988, Santillana

La cenicienta, 1988, Santillana

Caperucita Roja, 1988, Santillana

Blancanieves, 1988, Santillana

Alerta Sings and Songs for the Playground/ Canciones Para el Recreo, 1989, Smithsonian Folkways Recordings

Aprender Cantando, 1990, Alma Flor Ada-Suni Paz

Songs in Spanish, 1992, Sanctuary Wooks-Scholastic

Amigos, 1994, Rei American

El Viejo Abuelo, 1995, Scholastic

Musica Matematica, 1995, Scholastic

Cantando con Suni Paz, 1995, Scholastic

Abecedario de los Animales, 1996, Alma Flor Ada-Suni Paz

Waves, 1996, Mimosa

Como Una Flor, 1996, Alma Flor Ada-Suni Paz

Cielo Abierto (K-2nd Grade), 1996, Harcourt-Brace

Cuentos Cantados (K-3rd Grade), 1997, Mimosa

Gathering the Sun, 1997, Alma Flor Ada-Suni Paz

Canciones Para el Recreo: Children's Songs for the Playground, 1998, Smithsonian Folkways

Smithsonian Folkways Children's Collection, 1998, Smithsonian Folkways

Alerta Sings and Songs for the Playground/ Canciones Para el Recreo, 2000, Smithsonian Folkways

Raíces Latinas: Smithsonian Folkways Latino Roots Collection, 2002, Smithsonian Folkways

Bandera Mía: Songs of Argentina, 2007, Smithsonian Folkways

Tú eres mi flor: Songs for Children en Español: Elizabeth Mitchell and Suni Paz, 2018, Smithsonian Folkways
