= Izkia Siches =

Chilean physician and president of the Chilean Medical College

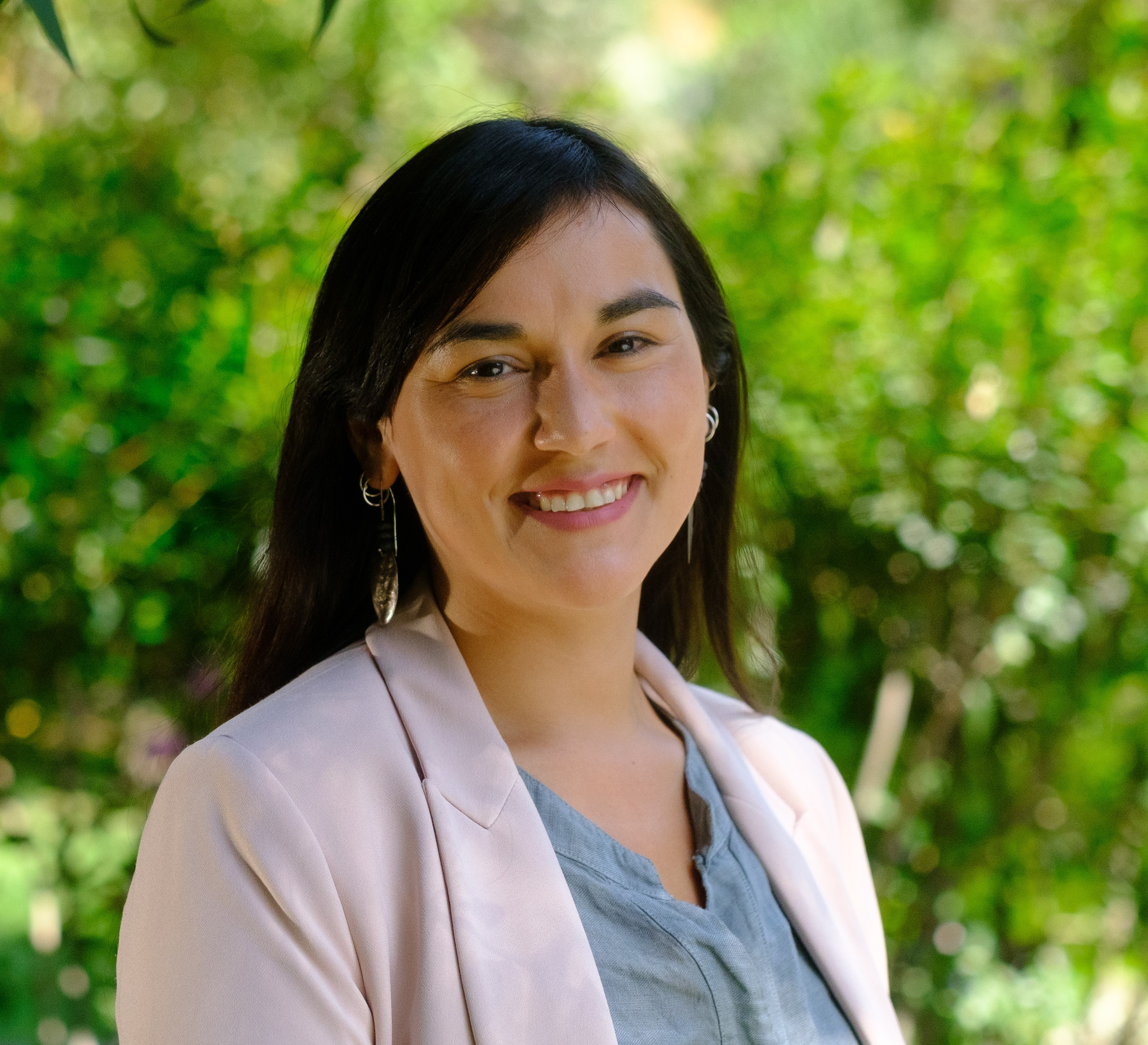
- Siches in 2022

Minister of the Interior and Public Security
- In office 11 March 2022 – 6 September 2022
- President: Gabriel Boric
- Preceded by: Rodrigo Delgado
- Succeeded by: Carolina Tohá

Personal details
- Born: Izkia Jasvin Siches Pastén; 4 March 1986 (age 40) Arica, Chile
- Spouse: Christian Antonio Yaksic Zúñiga
- Education: Instituto Bernardo O’Higgins de Maipú
- Alma mater: University of Chile

Izkia Jasvin Siches Pastén (born 4 March 1986) is a Chilean physician and politician, who served in 2022 as Minister of Interior and Public Security for President Gabriel Boric. She was the first woman to hold that position, the second most important in government after the President.

Siches formerly served as president of the Chilean Medical College, an influential medical association. In 2021, Siches served as campaign manager for Gabriel Boric's successful presidential campaign.

== Early life ==
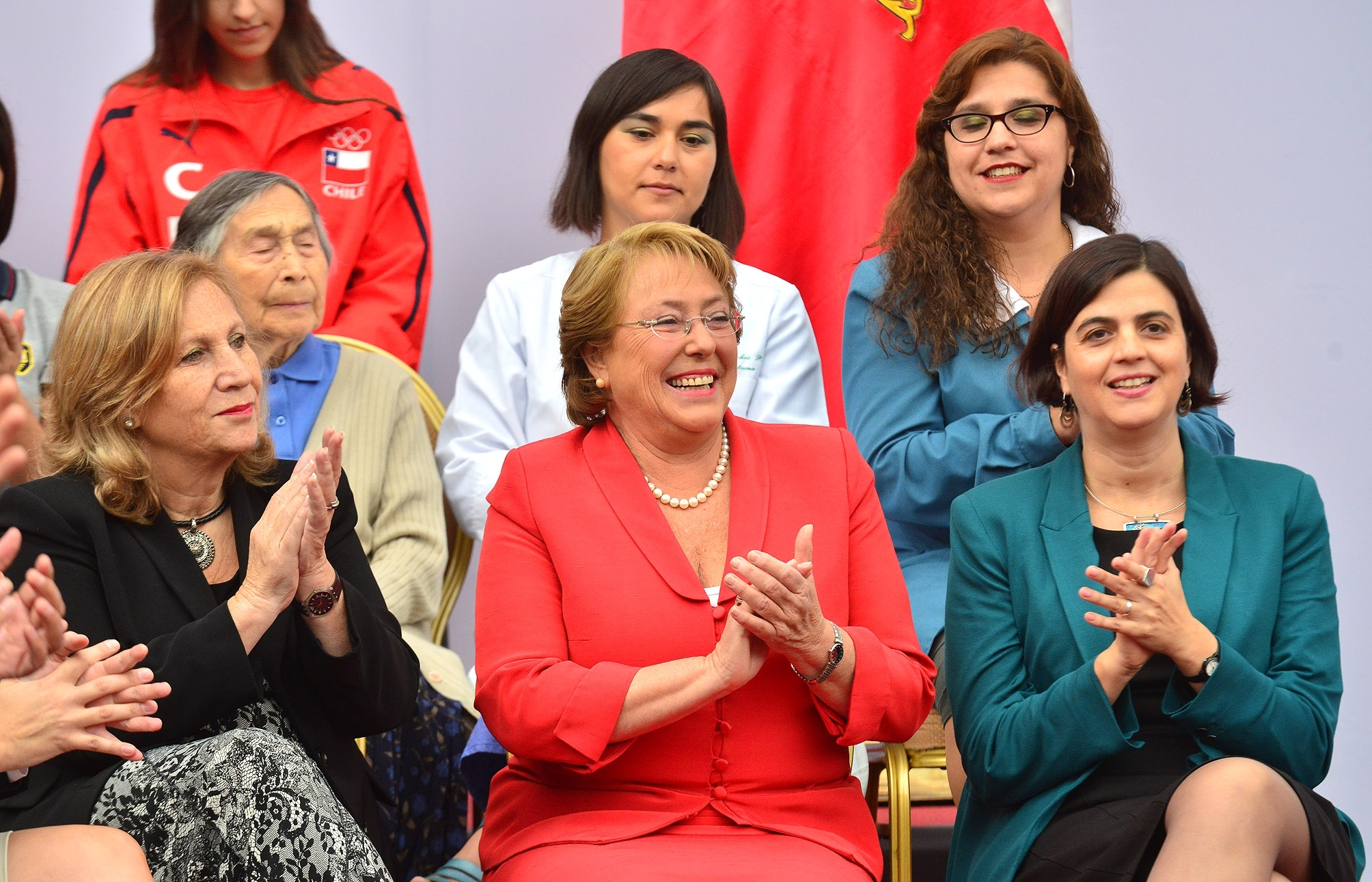
Siches (back row) with President Michelle Bachelet in 2014

She was born on 4 March 1986 in Arica in the far-North of Chile and grew up in Maipú, Santiago Metropolitan Region. She studied at the Instituto Bernardo O'Higgins high school in Maipú.

In 2004, she began studying medicine at the University of Chile. During this period, she was a member of the Communist Youth of Chile. She was a member of the University Senate during the period from 2010 to 2012. Previously, she was president of the School of Medicine West Campus student center, and adviser to the University of Chile Student Federation (Federación de Estudiantes de la Universidad de Chile). She helped create the journal Hippocampus: Where memory is stored, dreams arise (Hipocampo, donde se guarda la memoria surgen los sueños).

== Medical career ==
After she graduated as a surgeon, she specialized in internal medicine and began studying for a master's in public health. Since 2014 she has worked in the infectious diseases unit of San Juan de Dios Hospital in Quinta Normal.

In 2014 Siches was president of the Santiago Regional Council of the Chilean Medical College (Colegio Médico de Chile). Two years later she joined the organization Médicos sin Marca. In 2017 she was chosen as president of the Chilean Medical College, making her the first woman to serve in this role. El Mercurio reported that she had ties to the Broad Front political coalition, but she distanced herself from politics, saying that she preferred to stay on the sidelines and that her medical association includes people with varied political views:

Not the Broad Front, I come from a more traditional world like New Majority, but I don't want the New Majority now either, so I stay on the sidelines. We have the support of doctors with various ideas, regardless of whether they feel they belong to the Broad Front, to the Christian Democrats, or others who are clearly on the right. We are doctors with different ideas, and we succeeded in creating a program that made sense to the majority of our colleagues.

— Izkia Siches, 29 May 2017, Publimetro.

== Role during the COVID-19 pandemic ==
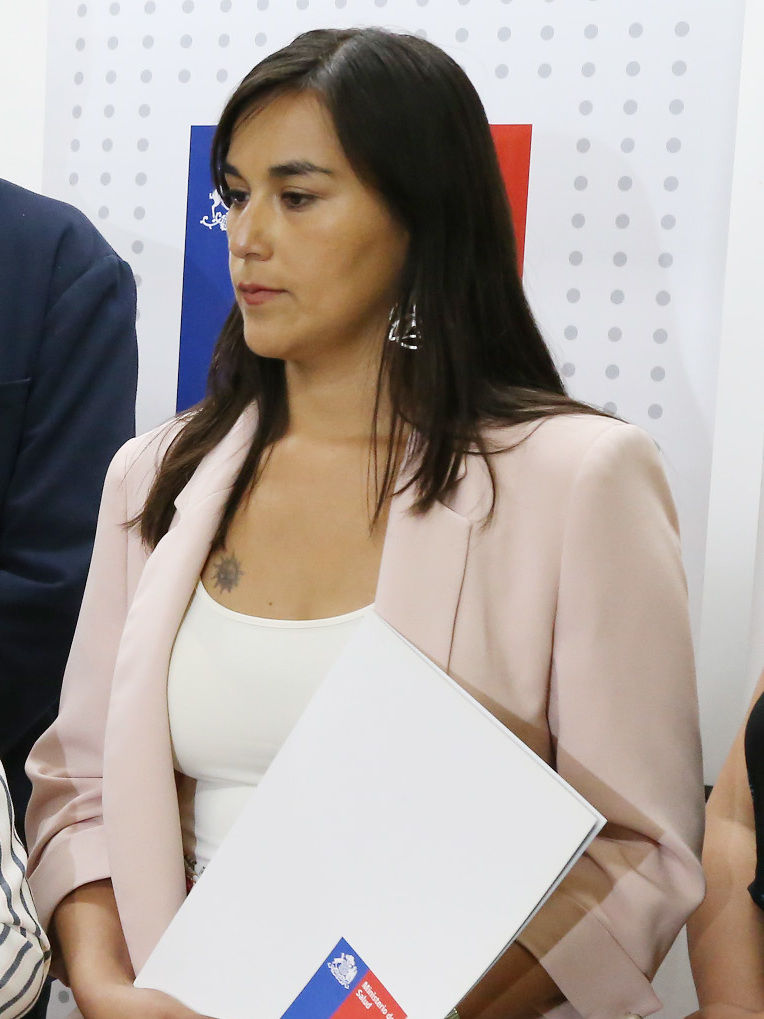
Siches as President of the Chilean Medical College, in 2019.

In 2020 during the beginning of the COVID-19 pandemic in Chile, she played a major role due to her position as president of the Medical College, making recommendations for how to better contain the virus. She questioned the government's handling of the crisis, which led to disagreements with officials. Her approval rating became one of the highest among Chilean public figures during the pandemic, and she was discussed as a possible presidential candidate for the 2021 election, though she dismissed the possibility of a run due to lack of experience. Siches endorsed Gabriel Boric's presidential campaign prior to the Broad Front presidential primary.

In December 2020, she ran for reelection in the Chilean Medical College. The election had a historically high participation rate (68.76%), and Siches won with 51.78% of the vote.

She was selected as Person of the Year in 2020 by the Association of International Press Correspondents in Chile (Asociación de Corresponsales de Prensa Internacional en Chile), for "turning herself into a figure of importance, achieving high levels of public trust and credibility". In 2021, Time magazine included her on its list of 100 rising stars shaping the future. In March 2021, she received the Exceptional Women of Excellence award from the Women Economic Forum.

In June 2021 Siches, speaking on behalf of the Chilean Medical College, proposed a total lockdown of the country. Subsequently, she was harshly criticized by Jaime Mañalich and José Antonio Kast of the Republican Party called for Siches to renounce.

== Minister of the Interior and Public Security ==
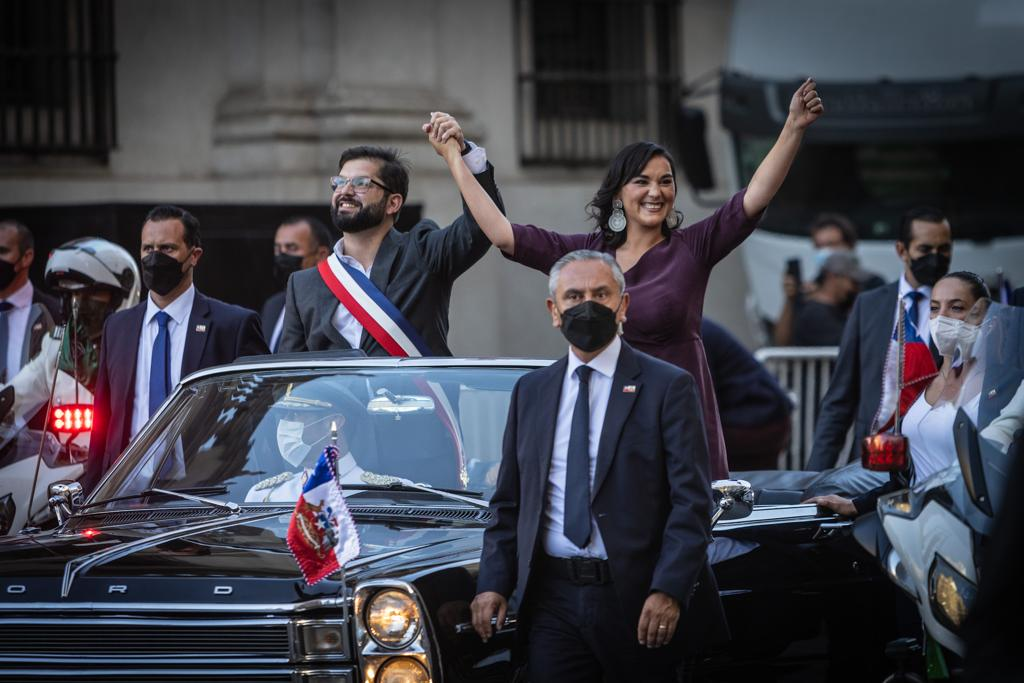
Siches as Minister of the Interior with President Gabriel Boric during his inauguration.

She left the presidency of the Chilean Medical College in November 2021 to be part of Gabriel Boric's second round presidential campaign, that he finally won. Siches was seen as one of the principal figures in the campaign that helped Boric to win the election. Her tour in the northern regions of the country was identified by political experts as one of the reasons those regions voted for Boric in the second round, despite mediocre results in the first round.

On 11 March 2022, Siches was appointed as Minister of the Interior and Public Security by Gabriel Boric, in a ceremony held in the National Congress of Chile. She is the first woman to hold this position.

In mid-March Siches was received with gunfire during a visit to Temucuicui and had to be evacuated. She had intended to hold a meeting with the family of Camilo Catrillanca, a Mapuche activist and farmer shot dead by police in 2018. Victor Queipul, a lonko of Temucuicui, explained later that the visit was made in a wrongful way disregarding traditional Mapuche protocols. Her advisors on indigenous matters and on Araucanía and Bío-Bío, Salvador Millaleo and Rubén Sánchez Curihuentro disagreed with the trip to Temucuicui and resigned in the aftermath of the incident.

In April 2022 Siches falsely accused the previous government of being responsible for a failed deportation event. According to Siches in March 2022 an aeroplane had to return to Chile with Venezuelan deportees after the passengers were denied entry to Venezuela. Later she retracted the story and apologised to former minister Rodrigo Delgado for making false accusations. The public prosecutor's office opened an enquiry for omission of report and for possible offences of the previous administration related to Siche's accusations. For its part the government was able to determine that Siches false claims had originated in the Direction of Migration (Dirección de Migraciones).

On 6 September 2022, it was announced that Siches would be replaced by Carolina Tohá. Prior to her replacement polls showed that she had the lowest approval ratings of among government ministers.

== Personal life ==
She is married to Christian Antonio Yaksic Zúñiga. In 2021, during her tenure as President of the Chilean Medical College, she gave birth to her daughter, Khala.

She identifies as a feminist, and through her position as president of the Medical College she has urged respect for women's rights, gender equality, and protocols to stop abuse and harassment. She has also participated in rallies including on International Women's Day.

After leaving the Boric cabinet she returned to work at the San Juan de Dios Hospital. Because the public health system paid for her medical specialization, Siches was legally bound to complete another year in her former workplace.
