= Jill McElmurry =

American painter, writer and illustrator

- Born: November 3, 1954; Los Angeles, California
- Died: August 3, 2017 (aged 62); Taos, New Mexico
- Education: SUNY Purchase, School of Visual Arts
- Occupations: painter, illustrator, writer
- Website: JillMcElmurry.com

Jill McElmurry (1954 – August 3, 2017) was an American painter, book illustrator, and sometime writer-illustrator of children's picture books.

== Biography ==
McElmurry was born in Los Angeles, California and moved to Taos, New Mexico with her family as a child, where they stayed for six years. She came from a family of artists, including her father, a character designer for film companies including Walt Disney; her mother, a fashion illustrator; and her grandfather, an RKO Pictures scenic painter. McElmurry studied briefly at SUNY Purchase and at the School of Visual Arts in New York.

She was the illustrator of numerous books for children, including the Little Blue Truck series written by Alice Schertle and the self-penned Mad About Plaid. Her style features detailed gouache paintings with distinctive characters. As a fine art painter, McElmurry initially worked in editorial illustration and later became known for her landscape paintings of New Mexico.

McElmurry lived with her husband in Taos and in Good Dog Island, Minnesota until her death from breast cancer on August 3, 2017.
