= Alma Flor Ada =

Cuban-American author and poet

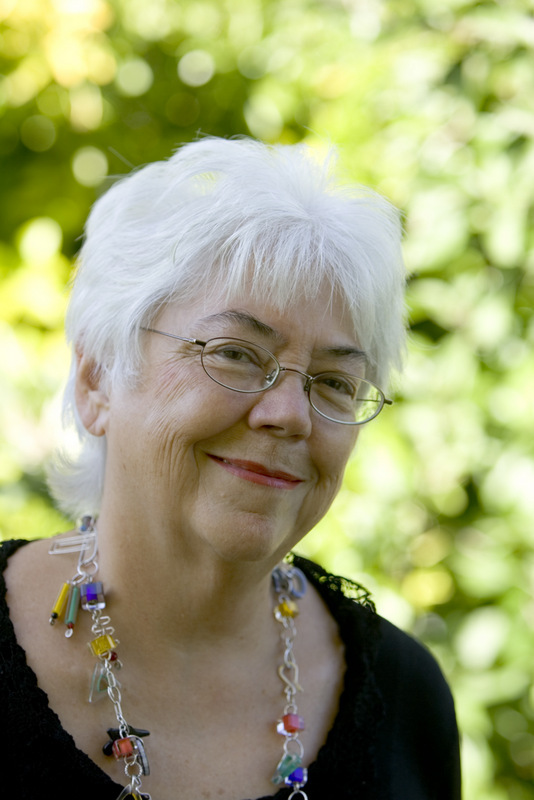
- Born: Alma Flor Ada Lafuente; 3 January 1938 (age 88); Camagüey, Cuba
- Occupations: Writer, Educator, University Professor
- Writing career
- Genres: poetry, children's literature, adult novels, memoirs, pedagogy, educational materials
- Subjects: literature, language, education
- Notable works: My Name is María Isabel, Gathering the Sun, Yes! We are Latinos, A Magical Encounter, Authors in the Classroom
- Movements: critical pedagogy, transformative education
- Website: almaflorada.com

Alma Flor Ada (born January 3, 1938) is a Cuban-American author of children's books, poetry, and novels. A Professor Emerita at the University of San Francisco, she is recognized for her work promoting bilingual and multicultural education in the United States.

== Biography ==
Alma Flor Ada was born in Camagüey, Cuba on January 3, 1938, to Modesto Ada Rey and Alma Lafuente. She grew up in La Quinta Simoni, a house owned by the family of Cuban revolutionary Ignacio Agramonte. Born into a family of storytellers, poets, and educators, she grew up hearing traditional tales re-told by her grandmother, father, and uncle. At the age of 15, she traded a quinceañera party for summer school in the United States, thus beginning her life as a bilingual person.

After completing high school in Cuba, she earned a scholarship to attend Loretto Heights College. There she first encountered discrimination against Mexican-Americans, a discovery inspirational to her diversity appreciation efforts. After a year at Barry College in Miami, she earned a Diploma de Estudios Hispanos with an Excellency Award at the Universidad Complutense de Madrid. She completed her Ph.D at the Pontificia Universidad Católica del Perú. She was awarded a Fulbright Scholars Exchange Grant and appointed a Radcliffe Institute scholar at Harvard University and prepared her dissertation for publication, Pedro Salinas: El diálogo creador.

In 1970, she and her four children relocated permanently to the United States. She currently resides in Marin County, California, and has nine grandchildren.

== Career ==
Dr. Ada began her teaching career in Lima, Peru where she taught at the Abraham Lincoln Bilingual School and the Alexander von Humboldt Trilingual School. In the United States, she was an associate professor at Emory University, a professor at Mercy College of Detroit, and the University of San Francisco where she retired as a Professor Emerita. At the University of San Francisco, she directed 160 dissertations in the field of International Multicultural Education. She was a visiting professor at the University of Texas, El Paso, St. Thomas University in Houston, The University of Guam, Associated Colleges of the Midwest, Universidad Complutense, Madrid, and Fundación José Ortega y Gasset, Madrid, and an author in residence at the University of Texas, El Paso and UC Davis. A renowned speaker at national and international conferences, she has shared her educational vision. She delivered the keynote speech, "Beyond Biliteracy", at the NABE 2014 conference in San Diego, where she was awarded the Mexican Government's Ohtli award for her lifetime contributions to the advancement of Mexican communities abroad through numerous projects such as the Pajaro Valley Literacy Project. In 2008, the California Association of Bilingual Educators (CABE) established "The Alma Flor Ada Teachership Award" given annually in her honor.

Alma Flor Ada is a major contributor to the advancement of critical pedagogy focused on personal realization and social justice, centered around incorporating experience based knowledge of parents and students into the classroom through authentic writing. She has published extensive educational materials, including Authors in the Classroom: A Transformation Education Process (co-authored with Isabel Campoy) and A Magical Encounter: Latino Children's Literature in the Classroom. She has authored reading programs by Harcourt School Publishers, Macmillan-McGraw Hill, Houghton Mifflin Harcourt, Scott Forseman, Santillana, and Frog Street. Dr. Ada has also served on numerous advisory boards, such as for Sesame Street in Spanish, Between the Lions, Loose Leaf, The Journal of Latinos and Education, and The National Association for Bilingual Education Journal, which she founded. Ada has contributed chapters to numerous books, including Teachers, Teaching, and Teacher Education (Harvard Education Review, 1987); Minority Education: From Shame to Struggle (Multilingual Matters, 1988); Literacy as Praxis (Culture Language and Pedagogy, Ablex 1990); Reclaiming Our Voices: Bilingual Education, Critical Education, and Praxis (California Association for Bilingual Education, 1995); Education Reform and Social Change (Multicultural Voices, Struggles and Visions, Lawrence Erlbaum, 1996).

== Writing ==
Alma Flor Ada has written extensively for both children and adults in both Spanish and English.

Her literature for adults includes two novels, A pesar del amor and En clave de sol, and her memoirs, Vivir en dos idiomas.

Her children's books are written in a variety of genres. A sample of her work includes:

- Autobiographical Books based on her childhood memories with character from her extended family, such as Where the Flame Trees Bloom and Under the Royal Palms (Pura Belpré Award, 2000);
- Traditional Folktales including, Tales Our Abuelitas Told (co-authored with Isabel Campoy), The Lizard and the Sun, and Three Golden Oranges;
- Original Folktale Picture Books with some examples being The Gold Coin (Christopher Award, 1991), The Malachite Palace, The Unicorn of the West, and Jordi's Star ;
- Fractured-fairytale Picture Books such as Dear Peter Rabbit, Yours Truly Goldilocks, With Love, Little Red Hen, and Extra, Extra: Fairy-tale News From Hidden Forest ;
- Other Picture Books such as Friend Frog and Let Me Help.

The reality of Latino children in the United States has been inspirational for much of her work. Gathering the Sun (Once Upon a World Award) is a poetry ABC book in celebration of farm workers and is held in over 2000 libraries. For example, the picture book I Love Saturdays, y dominos, the chapter book My Name is María Isabel held in 1817 libraries, and two middle grade novels, co-authored with her son Gabriel Zubizarreta, Dancing Home and Love, Amalia all focus on the themes of celebrating heritage while living Latino in the United States. Yes! We are Latinos, co-authored by Isabel Campoy and illustrated by Caldecott Award winner David Díaz, is a combination of poetry and non-fiction depicting the richness of the Latino heritage.

Libraries Unlimited has published two volumes of Alma Flor Ada and You in the series The Author in You where the authors explain the inspiration and meaning behind their books.

Alma Flor Ada has also translated extensively from English into Spanish for authors such as Lucille Clifton, Evaline Ness, Judy Blume, Judith Viorst, Ruth Heller, Nancy Luenn, Audrey Wood, Jane Yolen, Cynthia Rylant. In collaboration with Isabel Campoy, Alma Flor has also translated works of authors such as Lois Ehlert, Ellen Stoll Walsh, Mem Fox, and Gerald McDermott.

== Awards and honors ==
=== Academic honors ===
- Fulbright Scholar, 1965–1967;
- Radcliffe Institute Scholar, 1965–1967;
- Michigan Endowment for the Arts, 1974;
- Distinguished Research Award, University of San Francisco School of Education, 1984;
- University of San Francisco Outstanding Teaching Award, 1985;
- California PTA Association Award, 1990;
- Los Angeles Bilingual Directors Association Award, 1991;
- American Research Association Hispanic Issues Award, 2010;
- California Association for Bilingual Education Lifetime Achievement Award, 2010;
- American Association of Hispanics in Higher Education, 2011.

=== Literary awards ===
- Marta Salotti Gold Medal (Argentina) 1989 – Encaje de piedra;
- Christopher Award 1992 – The Gold Coin;
- Notable Book (National Council for Social Studies/Children's Book Council) – The Gold Coin;
- Parent's Choice Honor 1995 – Dear Peter Rabbit;
- Aesop Accolade, American Folklore Association 1995 – Medio Pollito/Half Chicken;
- American Bookseller Pick-of-the-List 1995 – Medio Pollito/Half Chicken;
- Once Upon the World Award, Museum of Tolerance 1998 – Gathering the Sun;
- Gold Medal, Parenting Magazine 1998 – The Lizard and the Sun;
- Pura Belpre, American Library Association 2000 – Under the Royal Palms;
- Best Ten Books for Babies, Center for Early Literacy 2004 – ¡Pío Peep!;
- 100 Titles for Reading and Sharing 2004 – ¡Pío Peep!;
- Best Book Selection, American Library Association 2006 – Tales Our Abuelitas Told.

In recognition of her entire literary career:

- Reading the World Award 2005 (University of San Francisco);
- Virginia Hamilton Award 2012;
- Ohtli Award 2014.

== Bibliography ==
=== Selected chapter books ===
- My Name is María Isabel & Me llamo María Isabel (Notable Book in the area of Social Studies, "Pick of the List" ABA, included in its entirety in the Norton's Anthology of Children's Literature) (1993)
- ¿Quién cuida al cocodrilo? (1994)

=== Selected middle-grade novels ===
- Dancing Home (2011) & Nacer Bailando (2011) (co-authored with Gabriel Zubizarreta)
- Love, Amalia (2012) (International Latino Book Award) & Con cariño, Amalia (2012) (co-authored with Gabriel Zubizarreta)

=== Selected poetry ===
- Abecedario de los animales (illustrated by Viví Escrivá) (1990)
- Gathering the Sun: An ABC in Spanish and English (English translation by daughter Rosalma Zubizarreta) (illustrated by Simón Silva) (Once Upon a World Award; Pura Belpré Illustrator's Honor) (1997)
- Coral y Espuma (illustrated by Viví Escrivá) (2003)
- Abeceloco (illustrated by María Jesús Álvarez) (2010)
- Salta, saltarín (with F. Isabel Campoy) (illustrated by Claudia Legnazzi) (2010)
- Yes! We Are Latinos (with F. Isabel Campoy) (illustrated by David Díaz) (2013)
- Todo es cancion (2013)
- Arrullos de la sirena (2015)

=== Selected memoirs ===
- Where the Flame Trees Bloom (1998)
- Under the Royal Palms (2000)
- Island Treasures. Growing up in Cuba (2015)

=== Selected nursery rhymes (selector and contributor) ===
(all with F. Isabel Campoy)

- Pío Peep: Traditional Spanish Nursery Rhymes (English adaptations by Alice Schertle) (illustrated by Viví Escrivá) (2006)
- Mamá Goose: A Latino Nursery Treasury/Un tesoro de rimas infantiles (illustrated by Maribel Suárez) (2004)
- Merry Navidad: Christmas Carols in Spanish and English (English version by Rosalma Zubizarreta) (illustrated by Viví Escrivá) (2007)
- ¡Muu, moo!: Rimas de animales/Animal Nursery Rhymes (English version by Rosalma Zubizarreta) (illustrated by Viví Escrivá) (2010)
- Ten Little Puppies / Diez perritos (English version by Rosalma Zubizarreta)(illustrated by Ulises Wensell)(2011)

=== Selected picture books ===
- Friends (illustrated by Barry Koch) (English version by Rose Zubizarreta) (1989) & Amigos (1989)
- The Song of the Teeny-Tiny Mosquito (illustrated by Viví Escrivá) (translation by Bernice Randall) (1989) & El canto del mosquito Alfaguara (1989)
- Strange Visitors (illustrated by Viví Escrivá) (translation by Bernice Randall (1989) & Una extraña visita (1989)
- The Gold Coin (illustrated by Neill Waldman) (translation by Bernice Randall) (1991) & La moneda de oro (1991) (Christopher Award 1991)
- In the Cow’s Backyard (illustrated by Viví Escrivá) (translation by Rosalma Zubizarreta) (1991) & La hamaca de la vaca o Un amigo más (1991)
- It Wasn’t Me (illustrated by Viví Escrivá) (translation by Rosalma Zubizarreta) (1991) & No fui yo (1991)
- “Turkey for Thanksgiving?” “No, thanks” (illustrated by Viví Escrivá) (translation by Rosalma Zubizarreta) (1991) & Pavo para la cena (1991)
- Dear Peter Rabbit (illustrated by Leslie Tryon) (translated by Rosalma Zubizarreta) (1994) & Querido Pedrín (1994) (Parent's Choice Honor Book)
- The Unicorn of the West (illustrated by Abigail Pizer) (translated by Rosalma Zubizarreta) (1994) & El unicornio del oeste (1994)
- Jordi's Star (illustrated by Susan Gaber) (1996) (Children's Books of the Year 1997 Booklist starred review)
- I Love Saturdays y domingos (illustrated by Elivia Savadier) (1994) & Me encantan los Saturday y los domingos (2004)
- The Malachite Palace (illustrated by Leonid Gore) (translation by Rosalma Zubizarreta) (1998)
- Yours truly, Goldilocks (illustrated by Leslie Tryon) (translated by Rosalma Zubizarreta) (1998) & Atentamente, Ricitos de Oro (2007)
- Friend Frog (illustrated by Lori Lohstoeter) (2000)
- Love, Little Red Hen (illustrated by Leslie Tryon) (2001)
- Extra, Extra: Fairy-tale news from Hidden Forest (illustrated by Leslie Tryon) (2007) & Extra, extra: noticias del bosque escondido (2007)
- Let Me Help/Quiero ayudar (bilingual edition) (illustrated by Angela Domínguez) (2010)

=== Selected folktales ===
- The Rooster Who Went to His Uncle’s Wedding. A Latin American Folktale (illustrated by Kathleen Kuchera) (1993) & El gallo que fue a la boda de su tío. Cuento popular hispanoamericano (1993)
- Mediopollito /Half-chicken: A New Version of a Traditional Story (bilingual edition) (illustrated by Kim Howard) (translated by Rosalma Zubizarreta) (1995) (Aesop Accolade)
- The Lizard and the Sun/La lagartija y el sol: A Folktale in English and Spanish (illustrated by Felipe Dávalos) (English translation by Rosalma Zubizarreta) (1997) (Gold Medal Parenting Magazine)
- The Three Golden Oranges (illustrated by Reg Cartwright) (translated by Rosalma Zubizarreta) (1999)
- Tales Our Abuelitas Told: An Hispanic Folktale Collection (co-authored with F. Isabel Campoy) (illustrated by Felipe Dávalos, Viví Escrivá, Susan Guevara, Leyla Torres) (2004) & Cuentos que contaban nuestras abuelas (2004)

=== Selected musical CDs of poetry ===
rendered to music by Suni Paz

- Abecedario (1989)
- Gathering the Sun (1997)
- Coral y Espuma (2003)
- ¡Pío Peep!: A Selection of Songs in Spanish and English (2003)

=== Selected pedagogical books ===
- Días y días de poesía: Developing Literacy Through Poetry and Folklore (1992)
- Guía para padres y maestros de niños bilingües (2002)
- A Magical Encounter: Latino Children's Literature in the Classroom (2003)
- Authors in the Classroom: A Transformative Education Process (with F. Isabel Campoy and Rosalma Zubizarreta) (2004)
- Spanish Literacy Strategies for Young Learners (with F. Isabel Campoy) (2010)
- Owning Meaning. Spanish Vocabulary Development (with F. Isabel Campoy) (2011)
- Margarita esta linda la mar. Para entender la poesia y usarla en el aula (with F. Isabel Campoy) (2015)

=== Selected chapters in professional publications ===
- Teachers, Teaching, and Teacher Education (Harvard Education Review, 1987)
- Minority Education: From Shame to Struggle (Multilingual Matters, 1988);
- Literacy as Praxis (Culture Language and Pedagogy, Ablex 1990)
- Reclaiming Our Voices: Bilingual Education, Critical Education, and Praxis (California Association for Bilingual Education, 1995)
- Education Reform and Social Change (Multicultural Voices, Struggles and Visions, Lawrence Erlbaum, 1996)
- Beyond Heroes and Holidays: A Practical Guide to K-12 Anti-Racist, Multicultural Education and Staff Development (Network of Educators of the Americas, 1997)
- Literacy Assessment of Second Language Learners (Allyn & Bacon, 2001)
- The Best for Our Children: Critical Perspective on Literacy for Latino Students (Teachers College Press, 2001)
