= Patricia Coombs =

American author and illustrator (1926–2026)

Patricia Coombs Fox (July 23, 1926 – January 12, 2026) was an American author and illustrator of many children's picture books, including the popular Dorrie the Little Witch series.

== Background ==
Coombs was born in Los Angeles, California, on July 23, 1926. Of her childhood, she said, "I was forever being told to get my nose out of a book and go outside. As a result, I ended up reading in odd places where I wouldn’t be noticed—behind my brother’s mice cages, under lilac bushes. The smells of mice and lilacs to this day evoke certain stories." She attended DePauw University in Greencastle, Indiana, and received her B.A. (1947) and M.A. (1950) in English literature from the University of Washington. She first started writing and illustrating stories for her two daughters, the youngest of which, together with a Siamese cat named Dingbat, became the inspiration for Dorrie and her cat Gink.

Coombs married C. James Fox (1922–2013), and they lived in the New York City area for most of their lives. She later lived in East Lyme, Connecticut. Coombs died on January 12, 2026, at the age of 99.

== Bibliography ==
=== Dorrie the Little Witch series ===
Dorrie is a little witch whose "hat is always on crooked and her stockings never match." She has a black cat named Gink who follows her wherever she goes. She lives with her mother, the Big Witch, and their house-hand, Cook. All of the 20 Dorrie books, except Dorrie and the Haunted Schoolhouse and the 2009–2010 print-on-demand (POD) reprints, are currently out of print. However, the reprints provided by CreateSpace Independent Publishing Platform are readily available at such online bookstores as Amazon.com.

- Dorrie's Magic (1962)
- Dorrie and the Blue Witch (1964) – When Dorrie is left home alone by the Big Witch, she decides to have a tea party with Gink. There is a knock on the door. Expecting Cook to arrive any minute, Dorrie opens the door. Instead of Cook, she finds the bad Blue Witch. Dorrie scours Cook's magic cabinet, uses its contents to capture the Blue Witch and receives a gold cauldron for her efforts.
- Dorrie's Play (1965) – Shooed away by the Big Witch and Cook, Dorrie decides to put on a play with Gink. Dorrie picks up some cloth from the sewing room to use for her play. Not realizing it is the Big Witch's costume for the Costume Ball, she has Cook cut it and then uses it for stage curtains. Once it is discovered that the Big Witch's costume is ruined, Dorrie comes up with an idea that makes the Big Witch a winner.
- Dorrie and the Weather Box (1966) - Dorrie finds a picnic basket and wants to have a picnic, but it's raining. She decides to try to fix the weather by using the Big Witch's secret magic room. Unable to find a recipe for melting clouds, Dorrie mixes two recipes together and hopes for the best. Instead of fixing the weather, Dorrie creates a colorful storm inside the house. The Big Witch comes home just in time to make things right.
- Dorrie and the Witch Doctor (1967) - Dorrie promises to be on her best behavior when crabby Aunt Agra comes for a visit. Dorrie begins to feel ill and is sent to bed. The Witch Doctor is called and comes to diagnose Dorrie, but Aunt Agra is the one who winds up getting the treatment.
- Dorrie and the Wizard's Spell (1968) - Dorrie has a great time at the Bazaar until her mother disappears, and it turns out that the prankster Wink the Wizard is to blame.
- Dorrie and the Haunted House (1970) - During a storm, Dorrie gets glued out of her house by a protection spell, leaving her to take cover in an old house in the woods. There, she encounters two bandits, who have stolen Witchville's powerfully magical Blue Ruby.
- Dorrie and the Birthday Eggs (1971) - On an errand to buy some eggs for the Big Witch's birthday cake, Dorrie runs into the mischievous Thinnever Vetch, who steals Dorrie's galosh. While the Egg Witch and the Big Witch are busy trying to figure out which of the hens might be laying money instead of eggs, Dorrie must try to stop Thinnever Vetch from playing dangerous tricks on them all.
- Dorrie and the Goblin (1972) - Dorrie finds a goblin on her doorstep the day The Big Witch is having her Magic Show. She doesn't want to turn him out and goblin-sits in her room until the goblin gets out and Dorrie must use magic to save the day—and the goblin.
- Dorrie and the Fortune Teller (1973) - The Wizard Floog holds the Town Tower and Meadow in mortgage and is about to foreclose. Then, a fortune teller, Madame Zee, shows up and foresees Witchville being destroyed. Dorrie wonders if Madame Zee is to be trusted.
- Dorrie and the Amazing Magic Elixir (1974) - The Big Witch goes out, leaving Dorrie to take care of her new magic elixir. She doesn't realize that an old enemy lurks outside, just waiting for a chance to get his hands on the potion.
- Dorrie and the Witch's Imp (1975) – When a new group of witches moves into Glumglen, a nearby town, the Big Witch invites them to dinner. As the Big Witch is leaving to pick up her new dress, a visitor, Gloris, arrives to fill in for Cook. While the Big Witch is away, Dorrie helps Gloris prepare dinner. Dorrie quickly becomes suspicious of Gloris, and rightfully so. Gloris does her best to get Dorrie out of the way, and even conjures up an imp to replace Dorrie.
- Dorrie and the Halloween Plot (1976) - After a wild attempt at learning to ride a broomstick, Dorrie overhears the Flying Demons plotting to steal the Book of Shadows while everyone is distracted at the Halloween Pageant. Stuck in an awful costume, and with no time to spare, Dorrie must use her wits to stop the theft.
- Dorrie and the Dreamyard Monsters (1977) - The Dream Witch has run out of potion and everyone in Witchville is having nightmares about purple monsters. When the Big Witch's spell to conjure the Dream Witch goes wrong, Dorrie is transported to the Dreamyard, where she must help get the monsters under control once more.
- Dorrie and the Screebit Ghost (1979) - Dorrie's mother goes out to take part in a séance, accidentally leaving behind her instructions on how to summon spirits. Dorrie finds the spell and tries it out, unwittingly bringing a playful but mischievous ghost into the house.
- Dorrie and the Witchville Fair (1980) - Once again, it is up to Dorrie to save Witchville when malicious Old Irontoes creates a funhouse mirror designed to cast a spell on anyone who looks into it at the Witchville Fair.
- Dorrie and the Witches' Camp (1983) - Strange things have been happening at the Witches' Camp, and while the Big Witch insists that it's just a case of over-excited imaginations, Cook and Dorrie begin to suspect that the rumours of bears and sea monsters may have some truth to them after all, without realizing that there is an even more sinister explanation.
- Dorrie and the Museum Case (1986)
- Dorrie and the Pin Witch (1989) - As all of Witchville is busy getting ready for the Witches' Ball, only Dorrie suspects that everyone's recent crabbiness has something to do with the nasty Pin Witch and the free hats and shawls she has been handing out.
- Dorrie and the Haunted Schoolhouse (1992) - The Big Witch insists on Dorrie's going to school, but upon their arrival, Dorrie and the other students cannot find the teacher and decide to pass the time by trying out the potion recipe written up on the chalkboard. Their arguments lead to mistakes in potion-making, which cause the school to become airborne, and they must figure out how to get it back on the ground.

=== Other books ===
Although best known for her Dorrie series, Patricia Coombs has also written and illustrated several other picture books for children. All of them are currently out of print.

- The Lost Playground (1963)
- Waddy and His Brother (1963) - Waddy the raccoon feels neglected and unwanted after a new baby takes his place in the family. One day, Waddy is left to care for Baby, getting the chance to prove to his family that he can be useful. But when Mother Raccoon leaves, things quickly get out of hand.
- Lisa and the Grompet (1970) - Lisa hates when other people tell her what to do, until one day when she meets an odd little creature who changes her mind.
- Mouse Cafe (1972)
- Molly Mullett (1975) - Molly Mullett's father wishes he had a son instead of a daughter, but Molly soon proves that she can outdo any boy when she tackles an Ogre who's been stealing food and gold from her hometown.
- The Magic Pot (1977) - In this cheeky tale, a little demon transforms himself into a magic pot and helps out a destitute couple by stealing from a wealthy household.
- Tilabel (1978) - Tilabel is a groundhog who loves to play and is no good at working. When her mother lies to the Groundhog Queen and says that Tilabel is an expert spinner, weaver, and sewer, the Queen orders Tilabel to make shirts for the Prince's birthday. Luckily, three mysterious Aunts appear to help Tilabel with her chore.
- The Magician and McTree (1984) - After McTree the cat falls into his magician-owner's cauldron and acquires the ability to talk, his antics cause him to wind up as a curiosity at the royal court. However, when the nobles' interest in him wanes, McTree finds himself lonely and looking for a way to get back to the old magician.

=== Illustrations ===
Patricia Coombs has illustrated all of her own books, as well as providing drawings for the following books written by other authors:

- Pepi's Bell (1969) by Shelagh Williamson
- P.J., My Friend (1969) by Noel B. Gerson
- Lobo (1969) by Gladys Yessayan Cretan
- Lobo and Brewster (1971) by Gladys Yessayan Cretan
- Bill and the Google-Eyed Goblins (1989) by Alice Schertle

=== Anthologies and compilations ===
- Dorrie and the Weather Box appears in the compilation Parade of Stories (1974), compiled by Esther M. Bjoland.
- Molly Mullett appears in the fairy tale anthology The Outspoken Princess and the Gentle Knight (1994), edited by Jack Zipes.
- Patricia Coombs appears as an entry in the Fifth Book of Junior Authors and Illustrators (1983), edited by Sally Holmes Holtze.
