= Pilar Armanet =

Chilean politician

Pilar Aramanet
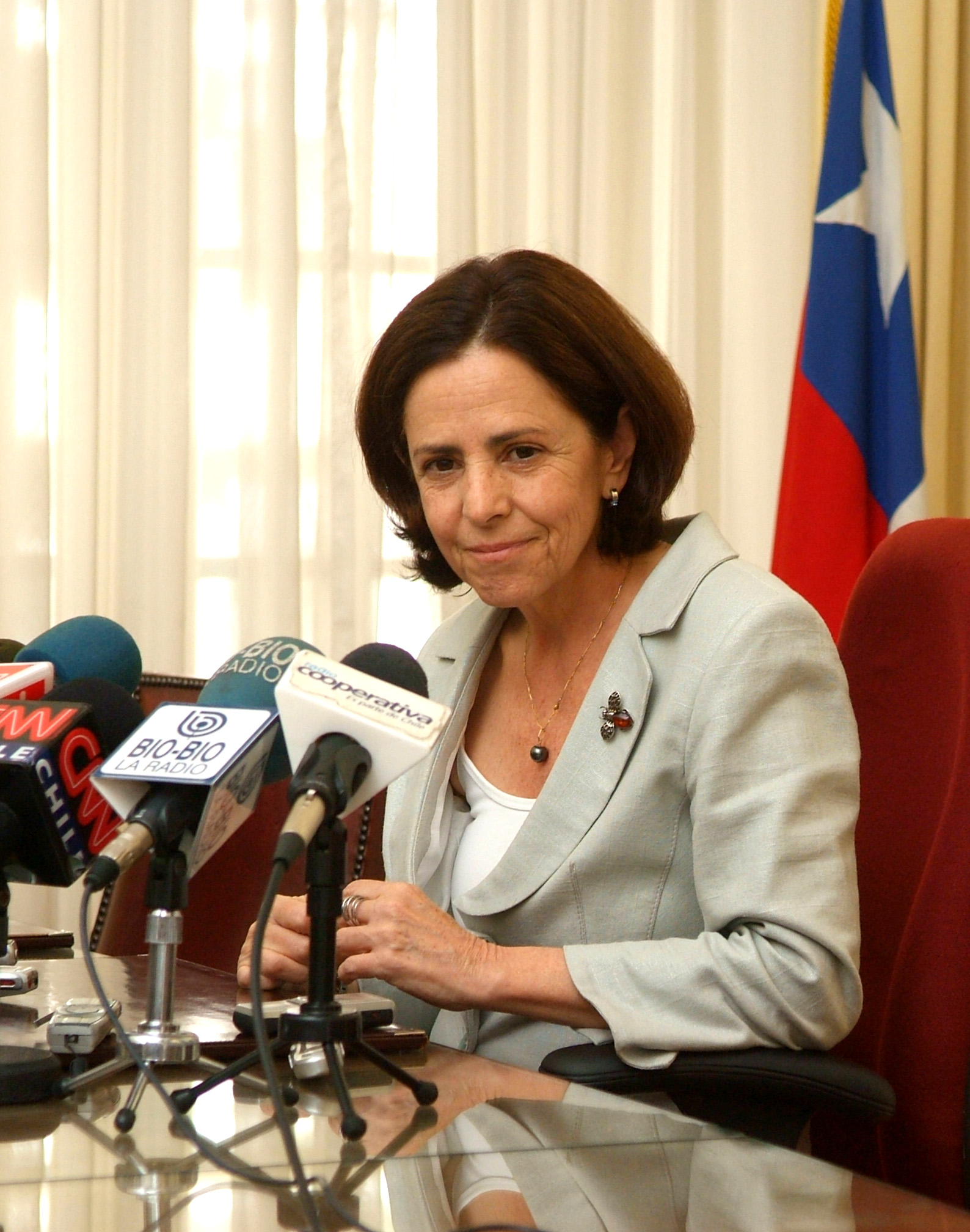

Minister Secretary-General of Government
- In office 18 December 2009 – 11 March 2010
- President: Michelle Bachelet
- Preceded by: Carolina Tohá
- Succeeded by: Ena von Baer

Ambassador of Chile at France
- In office 2 June 2006 – 18 December 2009
- Preceded by: Hernán Sandoval
- Succeeded by: Jorge Edwards

Personal details
- Born: 4 February 1950 (age 76) Santiago, Chile
- Party: Party for Democracy
- Spouse: Rafael Amunátegui
- Children: Three
- Parent(s): Armando Armanet; María Armanet
- Education: University of Chile (LL.B), (LL.M)
- Occupation: Researcher and Politician
- Profession: Lawyer

María Pilar Armanet Armanet (born 4 February 1950) is a Chilean politician and lawyer who served as Minister Secretary-General of Government during the first government of Michelle Bachelet (2006–2010).

She was the head of the University of the Americas.

== Family and education ==
She is the daughter of farmer and Liberal Party member Agustín Armanet Besa and María Armanet Izquierdo. She is married to fellow farmer Rafael José Astaburuaga Gutiérrez, with whom she has three children: Rafael, Andrés, and Rodrigo.

She completed her primary and secondary education at the French Nuns School in Santiago and subsequently studied law at the University of Chile, graduating in 1973. While at university, she was a classmate of Gutenberg Martínez, Soledad Alvear, and Mario Fernández, among other prominent figures in Chilean public life. She later obtained a master's degree in international studies from the same institution. During those years, she was a member of the National Party (PN).

Between 1983 and 1987, she served as director of the Institute of International Studies at the University of Chile, where she was also a lecturer and researcher.

== Government service ==
In 1991, she was appointed by Christian Democrat President Patricio Aylwin as director of the Culture Division of the Ministry of Education. Following her resignation, she resumed teaching at the institute and faculty where she had studied.

She participated in the development of the international affairs platform for Eduardo Frei Ruiz-Tagle's presidential campaign in 1993. Between 1995 and 1999, during the administration of Eduardo Frei Ruiz-Tagle, she served as president of the National Television Council (CNTV). Between 2000 and 2006, under President Ricardo Lagos, she was head of the Higher Education Division of the Ministry of Education.

Before being appointed Minister Secretary-General of Government in late 2009, Armanet had served, since April 2006, as Chilean ambassador to France.

== Other activities ==
In March 2010, she became Academic Vice-Rector of the University of the Americas. In April 2014, she assumed the rectorship of the institution.

She has served as an associate justice of the Santiago Court of Appeals, vice president of the Chilean Committee for Economic Cooperation in the Pacific Basin, and a member of the Foreign Policy Advisory Committee of the Ministry of Foreign Affairs.

In October 2013, she was one of the founding members of the political movement Fuerza Pública, led by economist Andrés Velasco.
