= Isabel Campoy =

Educationalist, author

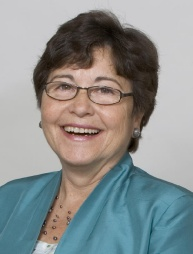
- Born: Francisca Isabel Campoy Coronado; June 25, 1946 (age 80); Alicante, Spain
- Occupation: Writer
- Writing career
- Genres: poetry, children's literature, pedagogy, educational materials
- Subjects: literature, language, education
- Notable works: Yes! We Are Latinos, Authors in the Classroom
- Literary movement: critical pedagogy, transformative education
- Website: isabelcampoy.com

Isabel Campoy (born June 25, 1946 in Alicante, Spain) is an author of children's books, poetry, and pedagogical resources. Central to Campoy's work is the promotion of bilingual education.

== Biography ==
F. Isabel Campoy was born in Alicante, Spain on June 25, 1946. Her father was a professor of English and her mother a tailor. Campoy first came to the US at the age of 16 as an AFS Intercultural Programs exchange student for one year of high school in Trenton, Michigan. She received her degree in English Philology at the Complutense University of Madrid in 1973 and completed post-graduate courses at University of Reading. She returned to the US as a Fulbright Scholar to continue her doctoral studies at UCLA. In 1981, she emigrated permanently to the United States where she worked as the senior acquisitions editor for foreign languages in the College Division of Houghton Mifflin in Boston. In addition to writing, Campoy has also served on numerous advisory boards, such as the San Francisco Public Library, Leap Frog, and American Reading Company. In 2012, the California Association of Bilingual Educators (CABE) established "The Isabel Campoy Teachership Award" given annually in her honor. In 2013, Campoy was named a Collaborating Member of the North American Academy of the Spanish Language. Campoy currently resides in San Rafael, California.

== Writing ==
Campoy's writing of over 150 titles covers a broad range of genres, from children's literature, poetry, textbook reading programs, and pedagogical books. Her children's books and poetry illuminate on the richness of the Latino culture and her strong belief in the power of transformation and social justice. Campoy frequently collaborates with Alma Flor Ada to author reading programs for Harcourt School Publishers, Houghton Mifflin Harcourt, Santillana, and Frog Street Press. She is the co-author (with Alma Flor Ada) of Gateways to the Sun / Puertas al Sol and has edited a number of anthologies of traditional folklore, poetry, and plays.

Campoy has also translated extensively from English into Spanish for authors such as Mo Willems, Gary Soto, Alice Schertle, Audrey Wood, Kathleen Krull, Lois Ehlert, Ellen Stoll Walsh, Mem Fox, and Gerald McDermott.

== Awards and honors ==
- Fulbright Scholar (1979-1981)
- Association of Spanish Professionals in the US, President (1992-1994)
- San Francisco Public Library Laureate Award (2003)
- University of San Francisco's Reading the World Award (2005)
- National Association of Bilingual Education Ramon Santiago Award (2016)

=== Literary awards ===
- Miami Herald Best Book of the Year (2004) - ¡Pío Peep!
- Notable Book Award, American Library Association (2004) - ¡Pío Peep!
- New York Public Library 100 Titles for Reading and Sharing (2004) - ¡Pío Peep!
- Parenting Magazine Books of the Year Award (2004) - ¡Pío Peep!
- Best Ten Books for Babies, Center for Early Literacy (2004) - ¡Pío Peep!;
- Best Book Selection, American Library Association (2006) - Tales Our Abuelitas Told / Cuentos que contaban nuestras abuelas.
- Junior Library Guild Premier Selection Award (2006) - Tales Our Abuelitas Told / Cuentos que contaban nuestras abuelas
- NCTE's Notable Poetry Titles (2014) - Yes! We are Latinos
- International Latino Book Award (2014) - Yes! We are Latinos
- International Latino Book Award (2015) - Poesía eres tú
- Silver Medal for Best Children's Nonfiction at the International Latino Book Awards (2025) - La expedición de la vacuna

== Bibliography ==
=== Selected poetry ===
- Poesía eres tú (illustrated by Marcela Calderón) (2014)
- Salta, Santarín (with Alma Flor Ada) (illustrated by Claudia Legnazzi) (2010)
- Pimpón (with Alma Flor Ada) (illustrated by Felipe Dávalos and others) (2000)
- Dulce es la sal (with Alma Flor Ada) (illustrated by Alicia Cañas) (1996)

=== Selected nursery rhymes (selector and contributor) ===
(all with Alma Flor Ada)

- Pío Peep: Traditional Spanish Nursery Rhymes (English adaptations by Alice Schertle) (illustrated by Viví Escrivá) (2006)
- Merry Navidad: Christmas Carols in Spanish and English (English version by Rosalma Zubizarreta) (illustrated by Viví Escrivá) (2007)
- ¡Muu, moo!: Rimas de animales/Animal Nursery Rhymes (English version by Rosalma Zubizarreta) (illustrated by Viví Escrivá) (2010)

=== Selected picture books ===
- Get Up Rick (illustrated by Bernard Adnet) (2007)
- Ibis and Jaguar's Dinner (illustrated by Amanda Hall) (2004)
- My Day from A to Z/Mi día de la A a la Z (illustrated by Sandra Lavandeira) (2009)
- Rosa raposa (illustrated by Jose Aruego and Ariane Dewey) (2002)
- Before and Now/Antes y ahora (with Pam Schiller) (2010)
- Fantástica fiesta (illustrated by Darrin Johnston) (1999)
- La pelota (illustrated by Gerardo Suzán) (2001)
- !Mírennos! (2010)
- Todas las buenas manos (illustrated by Yuyi Morales) (2001)
- Series Gateways to the Sun / Puertas al sol (with Alma Flor Ada) (2000)
- La Expedición de la Vacuna (2024)

=== Selected folktales ===
- Tales Our Abuelitas Told: An Hispanic Folktale Collection/ Cuentos que contaban nuestras abuelas: Una colección de Folklore Hispano (coauthored with Alma Flor Ada) (illustrated by Felipe Dávalos, Viví Escrivá, Susan Guevara, Leyla Torres) (2004)
- Mamá Goose: A Latino Nursery Treasury/Un tesoro de rimas infantiles (with Alma Flor Ada) (illustrated by Maribel Suárez) (2004)
- Ten Little Puppies/Diez perritos (with Alma Flor Ada) (illustrated by Ulises Wensel) (2011)

=== Música amiga collection of books and CDs ===
[coauthored with Alma Flor Ada. CDs with music and voice by Suni Paz]

- Canción y alegría
- Canta la letra
- Caracolí
- Con ton y son
- Corre al coro
- Do, re, mi, ¡Sí, sí!
- El camino de tu risa
- El son del sol
- ¡Qué rica la ronda!
- Sigue la música

=== Selected pedagogical books ===
coauthored with Alma Flor Ada

- Authors in the Classroom. A Transformative Education Process (2004)
- Spanish Literacy Strategies for Young Learners (2010)
- Comprehensive Language Arts (1998)
- Effective English Acquisition (1998)
- Home School Interaction with Cultural or Language Diverse Families (1998)
