= Salvador Millaleo =

Chilean lawyer, academic and advisor

- Salvador Millaleo Hernández
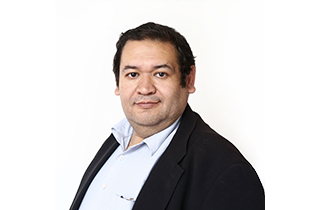
- Education: University of Chile's Faculty of Law University of Bielefeld, Germany
- Alma mater: University of Chile
- Occupation: Law
- Website: https://portafolio-academico.uchile.cl/perfil/39640-Salvador-Andres-Millaleo-Hernandez

Salvador Millaleo is a Chilean and Mapuche lawyer, university lecturer and former advisor on indigenous affairs to the Minister of the Interior and Public Security. He renounced his role as advisor following Minister Izkia Siches' failed visit to Temucuicui in March 2022, where she was received with gunfire. He is a councillor of the Chilean Institute of Human Rights for the 2019–2025 period.

== Biography ==
Salvador Millaleo Hernández was born in Talca and moved to Santiago at a young age. Part of his family is originally from the Araucanía Region. He defines himself as a Mapuche lawyer. He played a prominent role as an advisor to the Constitutional Convention (2021-2022) and was elected as a member of the National Institute of Human Rights (INDH) in 2019.

== Career academic ==
Chilean lawyer and professor specializing in human rights, environmental rights, and Indigenous rights. He holds a PhD in Sociology. A Chilean lawyer and professor, he holds a PhD in Sociology. He studied law at the University of Chile's Faculty of Law (1999) and later obtained his doctorate from the University of Bielefeld, Germany (2009). He is a professor in the Department of Legal Sciences and a researcher at our Faculty's Human Rights Center, specializing in Indigenous Rights, Human and Fundamental Rights, and the Internet. In March 2025 he was promoted to Associate Professor in the Ordinary Career.

He has taught at Diego Portales University, Alberto Hurtado University, and Andrés Bello University. He was Director of the Indigenous Rights Program at the Chile 21 Foundation.
