= Concha García =

Concha García may refer to:

- Concha García Campoy (1958–2013), Spanish radio and television journalist
- Concha García Zaera (1930–2023), Spanish digital artist
