= Ruth Heller (author) =

American writer and artist

- Born: 1923; Winnipeg, Manitoba, Canada
- Died: 2004 (age 81)
- Occupations: Author, artist
- Writing career
- Genre: Children's Literature

Ruth Heller Gross (1923–2004), professionally known as Ruth Heller, was a children's author and graphic artist known for her use of bright color and detail in both geometric design and the representation of creatures, plants, patterns, and puzzles. She worked primarily with a combination of colored pencil and marker for her book illustrations. Born in Winnipeg, Manitoba, Canada, she grew up in San Francisco, California, USA, where she lived until she died of cancer in 2004.

Heller began her career designing wrapping paper, cocktail napkins, greeting cards, and coloring books. She then went on to start writing and illustrating children's books in 1981. After a 6-year struggle she found a publisher for her first book, Chickens Aren't the Only Ones. Her books are written in a rhyming verse reminiscent of Gilbert and Sullivan, Hilaire Belloc, or Dr. Seuss.

== Biography ==
Heller received a degree in Fine Arts from the University of California, Berkeley in 1946. She paid for her own education through secretarial work and proceeded to work as a secretary following graduation.

In the early 1950s, she married Henry Heller and had two sons, Paul and Philip. Heller completed two years of graduate work in design at the California College of Arts and Crafts in Oakland, and got her first art job in the early 1960s, designing napkins, matchboxes, and gift wrap for Cost Plus. Henry died in 1965 and Heller poured herself into her career from then on, eventually expanding into illustrating puzzle books and colouring books for kids and adults.

In 1980, Heller visited an artists' colony in upstate New York, called Yaddo. She left that determined to start a new writing career. In 1985, she married Richard Gross who supported her work with enthusiasm until his death in 2002.

Most of Heller's books were published by Grosset & Dunlap. She wrote a brief autobiography called Fine Lines which was published in 1996.

== Colouring books ==
These colouring books have designs in them on a wide range of subjects and are appropriate for children or adults.

- Color and Puzzle (1968)
- The Oriental Rug Coloring Book (1973)
- Designs for Coloring
  - Designs for Coloring (1976?)
  - Designs for Coloring: More Designs (1976)
  - Designs for Coloring: 3 (1977)
  - Designs for Coloring: 4 (1977)
  - Designs for Coloring: Jumbo (1980)
  - Creative Coloring Activity: Designs by Ruth Heller (1981)
  - Designs for Coloring: Stitch (1984)
  - Designs for Coloring: Owls (1985)
  - Designs for Coloring: Geometrics (1990)
  - Designs for Coloring: Butterflies (1990)
  - Designs for Coloring: Cats (1990)
  - Designs for Coloring: Birds (1990)
  - Designs for Coloring: Flowers (1990)
  - Designs for Coloring: Snowflakes (1990)
  - Designs for Coloring: The Hebrew Alphabet (1991)
  - Designs for Coloring: Optical Art (1992)
  - Designs for Coloring: Seashells (1992)
  - Designs for Coloring: Tropical Fish (1997)
  - Designs for Coloring: The Far East (1997)
  - Designs for Coloring: Ancient Egypt (1999)
  - Designs for Coloring: More Flowers (1999)
  - Designs for Coloring: Prisms (2000)
  - Designs for Coloring: Insects and Spiders (2000)
- Stained Glass Designs for Coloring
  - Stained Glass Designs for Coloring: Geometrics (1998)
  - Stained Glass Designs for Coloring: Snowflakes (1998)
  - Stained Glass Designs for Coloring: More Geometrics (2000)

== Children's books ==
Non-fiction picture books used in schools and especially popular in ESL programs.

- World of Nature series
  - Chickens Aren't the Only Ones (about egg-laying animals, 1981).
  - Animals Born Alive And Well (about mammals, 1982)
  - The Reason For A Flower (about plants that have seeds and flowers, 1983)
  - Plants That Never Ever Bloom (about plants that do not, 1984)
- How to Hide - a series on camouflage
  - How to Hide a Whip-poor-will and Other Birds (1986)
  - How to Hide a Butterfly and Other Insects (1992)
  - How to Hide an Octopus and Other Sea Creatures (1992)
  - How to Hide a Polar Bear and Other Mammals ( 1994)
  - How to Hide a Crocodile and Other Reptiles (1994)
  - How to Hide a Meadow Frog and Other Amphibians (1995)
  - How to Hide a Parakeet and Other Birds (1995)
- World of Language - a series on parts of speech
  - A Cache of Jewels and Other Collective Nouns (1987)
  - Kites Sail High: A Book About Verbs (1988)
  - Many Luscious Lollipops: A Book About Adjectives (1989)
  - Merry-Go-Round: A Book About Nouns (1990)
  - Up, Up and Away: A Book About Adverbs (1991)
  - Behind the Mask: A Book About Prepositions (1995)
  - Mine, All Mine: A Book about Pronouns (1997)
  - Fantastic! Wow! And Unreal! A Book about Interjections and Conjunctions (1998)
- Color (a guide to how art goes through the four-color printing process, 1999)
- A Sea within a Sea: Secrets of the Sargasso (2000)
- Galapagos Means Tortoises (2003)

== Illustration ==
Heller also illustrated five books by other authors and a Merriam-Webster dictionary for very young children.

- The Egyptian Cinderella by Shirley Climo (1991)
- King of the Birds by Shirley Climo (1991)
- King Solomon and the Bee by Dalia Hardof Renberg (1994)
- The Korean Cinderella by Shirley Climo (1996)
- Blue Potatoes, Orange Tomatoes by Rosalind Creasy (2000)
- Merriam-Webster's Primary Dictionary (2005)
- Merriam-Webster's Alphabet Book (2005)
