= Mark Buehner =

American illustrator of children's books (born 1959)

- Born: 1959 (age 66–67); Salt Lake City, Utah, U.S.

Mark Buehner (born 1959 in Salt Lake City, Utah) is an American illustrator of children's books. He has illustrated award-winning children's books such as Snowmen at Night, Fanny's Dream, Superdog, The Adventures of Taxi Dog, The Escape of Marvin the Ape, The Queen of Style, and Balloon Farm. He won a "Best Picture Book" from Publishers Weekly for My Life with the Wave (1998).

Buehner's wife, Caralyn, authored some of the books Buehner has illustrated.

Buehner commonly adds hidden images to his illustrations, such as rabbits, cats, and dinosaurs.
