= Alicia Cañas Zañartu =

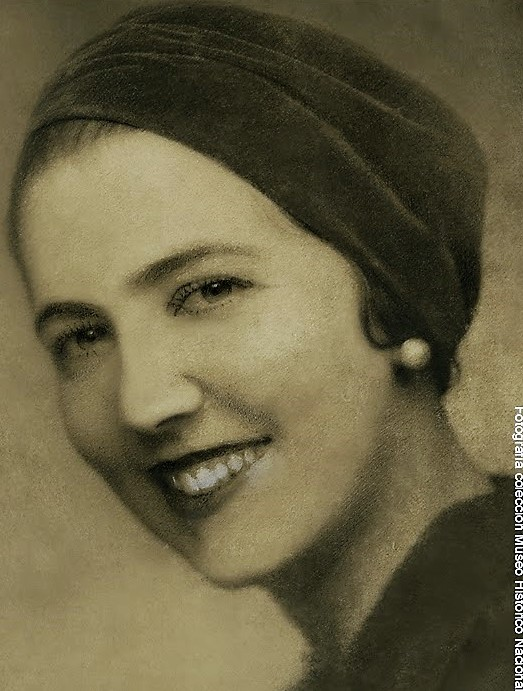
- Alicia Cañas Zañartu in 1935
- Born: 1901; Paris, France
- Died: March 27, 2002 (aged 100); Santiago, Chile
- Spouses: Arturo Sanfuentes; Augusto Errázuriz
- Parent(s): Rafael Cañas Ariztia and Amelia Zañartu Iñiguez
- Relatives: Juan Luis Sanfuentes (father-in-law)

Alicia Cañas Zañartu (Paris, France, August 1901 – Santiago, Chile, March 27, 2002) was a Chilean politician. In 1935, she was one of the first women elected to public office by popular vote in the country. Through this vote, became the first woman mayor in Providencia, and one of the first woman elected mayor in Chilean history after Aída Nuño in San Felipe and Hermogénita Hermosilla in Quilleco. She was the daughter-in-law of Juan Luis Sanfuentes, President of Chile.

== Life ==
Zañartu was the daughter of Rafael Cañas Ariztia and Amelia Zañartu Iñiguez. She was born in Paris in August 1901, where she lived until she was seven years old.

She married her first husband, Arturo Sanfuentes, who was the son of leading politician Juan Luis Sanfuentes and they had a daughter, Soledad. Dhee was widowed at 24 in 1925; Because of thism she went back to Paris, but returned to Chile at the request of her father.

In Chile, she remarried the lawyer Augusto Errázuriz and they had four children. She arrived in Chile with a reputation for being an independent woman. She had driven her own car in Paris and that was unusual for the time. She was influenced by Paris's large green areas; which she would later replicate in Providencia. She was a woman known for her charitable works for almost 50 years she led the "Home of the Blind in Santa Lucia". It was her dedication and effort that consolidated the work of the Foundation.
