= María Eugenia Oyarzún =

Chilean journalist and writer and former diplomat and mayor

Mayor of Santiago
- In office 1 June 1975 – 1 June 1976
- Preceded by: Hernán Sepúlveda Cañas
- Succeeded by: Patricio Mekis Spikin

Personal details
- Born: María Eugenia Oyarzún Iglesias; 1 June 1936 (age 89) Chile
- Spouse: Fernando Errázuriz Guzmán
- Occupation: Journalist, writer, diplomat
- Awards: Lenka Franulic Award (1964); Carmen Puelma Award (1996)

María Eugenia Oyarzún Iglesias (born 1 June 1936) is a Chile a journalist, writer, and former diplomat.

== Biography ==
Oyarzún is married to Fernando Errázuriz Guzmán, with whom she has children.

During the military dictatorship of General Augusto Pinochet, Oyarzún occupied the de facto position of mayor of Santiago from 1 June 1975 to 1 June 1976.

She was ambassador of the Government of Chile to the Organization of American States. She was the first woman to preside over the Political Council of that entity in October and December 1977.

Thanks to her close relationship with Pinochet, she was able to conduct interviews of him for various media, which would later be published in several books during the 1990s.

Oyarzún worked for the Santiago daily La Tercera for 46 years, and was director of the journalism schools of the University of Chile and UNIACC.

== Works ==
- Augusto Pinochet: diálogos con su historia. Conversaciones inéditas (Editorial Sudamericana, 1999)
- Augusto Pinochet: "Una visión del hombre" (Editorial Bauhaus, 1995)

== Awards ==
- 1965 – Lenka Franulic Award from the National Association of Women Journalists of Chile
- 1996 – Carmen Puelma Award from the Chilean Safety Association
