= Ezra Jack Keats Book Award =

Annual U.S. literary award

Ezra Jack Keats book award
- Date: April
- Country: United States
- Presented by: Ezra Jack Keats Foundation
- First award: 1985
- Final award: Active
- Website: www.ezra-jack-keats.org/section/ezra-jack-keats-book-awards/

The Ezra Jack Keats Book Award is an annual U.S. literary award.

At the Ezra Jack Keats Book Awards Ceremony every April, the Ezra Jack Keats Foundation presents the New Writer Award (since 1985) and New Illustrator Award (since 2001) to an author and an illustrator who are at an early stage of their career. An Honor Books category was added in 2012.

The nonprofit Ezra Jack Keats Foundation was established in 1964 in Brooklyn, New York by author and illustrator Ezra Jack Keats.

Until 2011, the Award was presented jointly with the New York Public Library. Since 2012, it is co-presented with the de Grummond Children’s Literature Collection at the University of Southern Mississippi, in Hattiesburg.

Award winners include Stian Hole, Garmann's Summer in 2009, Meg Medina, Tía Isa Wants a Car in 2012 and Don Tate, The Remarkable Story of George Moses Horton in 2016.

== Winner ==
Ezra Jack Keats Book Award winners
Year	Category	Author	Title
1986	Writer	Valerie Flournoy	The Patchwork Quilt
1987	Writer	Juanita Havill	Jamaica's Find
1989	Writer	Yoriko Tsutsui	Anna's Special Present
1991	Writer	Angela Johnson	Tell Me a Story, Mama
1993	Writer	Faith Ringgold	Tar Beach
1995	Writer	Cari Best	Taxi! Taxi!
1997	Writer	Juan Felipe Herrera	Calling the Doves (El Canto de las Palomas)
1999	Writer	Stephanie Stuve-Bodeen	Elizabeti's Doll
2000	Writer	Soyung Pak	Dear Juno
2001	Illustrator	Bryan Collier	Uptown
2001	Writer	D.B. Johnson	Henry Hikes to Fitchburg
2002	Writer	Deborah Wiles, illus. by Jerome Lagarrigue	Freedom Summer
2003	Illustrator	Sophie Blackall	Ruby's Wish
2003	Writer	Shirin Yim Bridges	Ruby's Wish
2004	Illustrator	Gabi Swiatkowska	My Name Is Yoon
2004	Writer	Jeron Ashford Frame	Yesterday I Had the Blues
2005	Illustrator	Ana Juan	The Night Eater
2005	Writer	Janice N. Harrington	Going North
2006	Illustrator	Yunmee Kyong	Silly Chicken
2006	Writer	Mary Ann Rodman	My Best Friend
2007	Illustrator	Kristen Balouch	Mystery Bottle
2007	Writer	Kelly Cunnane	For You Are a Kenyan Child
2008	Illustrator	Jonathan Bean	The Apple Pie that Papa Baked
2008	Writer	David Ezra Stein	Leaves
2009	Illustrator	Shadra Strickland	Bird
2009	Writer	Stian Hole	Garmann's Summer
2010	Illustrator	Taeeun Yoo	Only a Witch Can Fly
2010	Writer	Tonya Cherie Hegamin	Most Loved in All the World
2011	Illustrator	Tao Nyeu	Bunny Days
2011	Writer	Laurel Croza	I Know Here
2012	Illustrator	Jenny Sue Kostecki-Shaw	Same, Same but Different
2012	Writer	Meg Medina	Tía Isa Wants a Car
2013	Illustrator	Hyewon Yum	Mom, It’s My First Day of Kindergarten!
2013	Writer	Julie Fogliano	And Then It’s Spring
2014	Illustrator	Christian Robinson	Rain
2014	Writer	Ame Dyckman	Tea Party Rules
2015	Illustrator	Chris Haughton	Shh! We Have a Plan
2015	Writer	Chieri Uegaki	Hana Hashimoto, Sixth Violin
2016	Illustrator	Phoebe Wahl	Sonya's Chicken
2016	Writer	Don Tate	Poet: The Remarkable Story of George Moses Horton
2017	Illustrator	Micha Archer	Daniel Finds a Poem
2017	Writer	Jeri Watts	A Piece of Home
2018	Illustrator	Michael Mahin	Muddy: The Story of Blues Legend Muddy Waters
2018	Writer	Derrick Barnes	Crown: An Ode to the Fresh Cut
2019	Illustrator	Oge Mora	Thank you, Omu!
2019	Writer	John Sullivan	Kitten and the Night Watchman
2020	Illustrator	Ashleigh Corrin	Layla’s Happiness
2020	Writer	Sydney Smith	Small in the City
2021	Illustrator	Heidi Woodward Sheffield	Brick by Brick
2021	Writer	Tricia Elam Walker	Nana Akua Goes to School
2022	Illustrator	Gracey Zhang	Lala's Words
2022	Writer	Paul Harbridge	Out into the Big Wide Lake
2023	Illustrator	Doug Salati	Hot Dog
2023	Writer	Kari Percival	How To Say Hello to a Worm
2024	Illustrator	Sarah Gonzales	The Only Way to Make Bread
2024	Writer	Anne Wynter	Nell Plants a Tree
