= Zetta Elliott =

Canadian-American writer (born 1972)

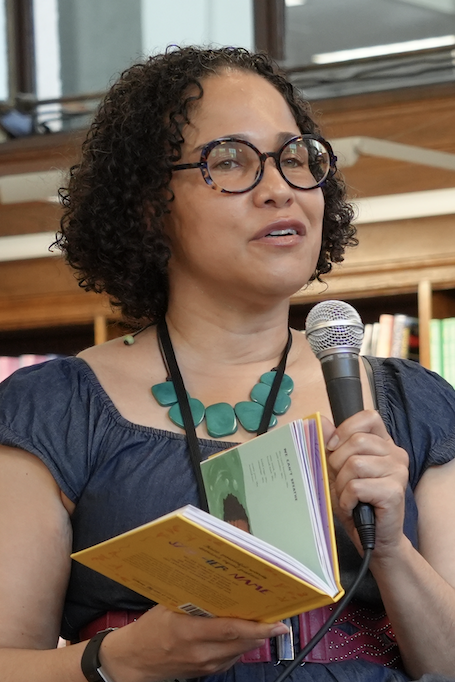
- Elliott in 2025
- Born: October 26, 1972 (age 53); Ajax, Ontario, Canada
- Education: New York University
- Occupations: Poet, playwright, and author
- Writing career
- Notable work: Bird (2008)
- Website: Official website

Zetta Elliott (born October 26, 1972) is a Canadian-American poet, playwright, and author. Her first picture book, Bird (2008), won many awards. She has also been recognized for other contributions to children's literature, as well as for her essays, plays, and young adult novels.

== Life ==
Elliott was born in Ajax, Ontario, Canada, on October 26, 1972. She has lived in the United States for most of her adult life, having moved to Brooklyn in 1994 to begin as a student at New York University (NYU). More recently, she moved to Philadelphia. She holds a PhD in American studies from NYU and has worked as a professor at several colleges.

== Writing ==
The topics of Elliott's writings include recovering from urban violence and other challenging issues of modern life, which she addresses partly to help her fellow black people feel seen.

Elliott's first professional publication was the children's picture book Bird, in 2008. Illustrator Shadra Strickland won the Ezra Jack Keats Book Award in 2009 for New Illustrator for the book. Bird also won the New Voices Award Honor from its publishing company, Lee & Low Books, as well as the 2009 Paterson Prize for Book for Young Readers, and the 2011 West Virginia Children's Choice Book Award. Elliott wrote Bird originally as a short story in 2006, but only found a publisher for it after she and Strickland re-worked it as a picture book.

Elliott's first young adult (YA) novels, A Wish After Midnight and its sequel, The Door at the Crossroads, are speculative fiction featuring a black teenager from Brooklyn, New York, who travels back in time to the Brooklyn of 1863. A Wish After Midnight was originally self-published in 2008, then re-released by Amazon Encore in 2010. The Door at the Crossroads was released in 2016.

The City Books series is aimed at much younger readers, ages 6 (kindergarten) to 10 (4th grade). The series began in 2014 with The Phoenix on Barkley Street, then continued with Dayshaun's Gift in 2015. Like A Wish After Midnight, Dayshaun's Gift involves sending the protagonist back to 1863, at the time of the New York City draft riots. The story is illustrated by Alex Portal. Elliott released City Books #3: The Ghosts in the Castle in 2017, along with City Books #4: The Phantom Unicorn. Both are illustrated by Charity Russell.

2015 marked the beginning of Elliott's collaboration with artist and illustrator Purple Wong, who illustrated Elliott's poem I Love Snow! as a children's picture book that year. In 2016, they released A Hand to Hold in February, Billie's Blues (also illustrated by Paul Melecky) in February, and Milo's Museum in November. The poetic picture book about autism, Benny Doesn't Like to Be Hugged, followed in 2017, and On My Block, also a poem, in 2020. Reflecting Elliott's activism in encouraging diverse representations in books, a background character in Benny Doesn't Like to Be Hugged is a Native American boy wearing a T-shirt depicting the comic-book character Super Indian, a Native superhero created by Arigon Starr.

In 2016, Tilbury House Publishers put out Melena's Jubilee: the story of a fresh start, illustrated with mixed media artwork by Aaron Boyd. It was listed as a Bank Street College of Education 2016 Best Children's Book of the Year with a star for outstanding merit, and was also named a 2017 Skipping Stones Honor Book by the international multicultural magazine Skipping Stones, in publication since 1988.

2017's YA novel Mother of the Sea was published by Elliott's own imprint, Rosetta Press, as were many of her titles for children.

The first book in Elliott's Urban Fantasy series for middle-grade children, Dragons in a Bag, was one of Amazon's picks for Amazon Best Children's Book of the Year in 2018. The second book in the series is called The Dragon Thief. Both were published by Random House and illustrated by Geneva B.

Elliott's answer to the question "In this divisive world, what shall we tell our children?" was published in 2018's We Rise, We Resist, We Raise Our Voices, as the poem "You Too Can Fly", illustrated by Laura Freedman. The anthology featured poems, letters, personal essays, art, and other works by 50 luminaries of the field, including Jacqueline Woodson and Kwame Alexander. It was recognized by both Kirkus Reviews and Publishers Weekly as a Best Book of 2018. In the poem, Elliott tells readers:

remember:

the fiercest dragons

emerge from the

darkest depths

and a single star

sparkling

in the sable sky

may guide you to

your destiny…

— Zetta Elliot, "You Too Can Fly"

She is a contributor to Margaret Busby's anthology New Daughters of Africa (2019). Also in 2019, Elliott published a book about writing, Find Your Voice: A Guide to Self-Expression. Her plays have been staged in New York and Chicago, and her essays have appeared in publications including Horn Book Magazine, School Library Journal, and The Huffington Post.

Her poetry collection Say Her Name (Poems to Empower) was published by Little, Brown Books for Young Readers in 2020. The collection includes 49 poems, four of which are tributes to other authors: Lucille Clifton, Audre Lorde, Nikki Giovanni, and Phillis Wheatley. The cover and illustrations are by Loveis Wise. A second collection, called American Phoenix, was published independently later the same year, containing 40 poems.

In 2020, Elliott published a children's picture book about police brutality and the Black Lives Matter protests, titled A Place Inside of Me: A Poem to Heal the Heart which (with illustrator Noa Denmon) won a 2021 Caldecott Honor. The story focuses on a young Black boy's experience of a Black woman's killing by police officers in his town. In 2021, the book was challenged by a parent in a Cold Harbor, Virginia school, with a county supervisor calling the book "garbage" and another characterizing it as political and offensive. After a review, the school board voted to keep the book in its collection. Elliott described the effort as part of a wider attempt by conservatives to censor perspectives of marginalized groups.

== Bibliography ==
=== Children's books ===
- Bird (2008), illustrated by Shadra Strickland
- The Last Bunny in Brooklyn (2014), illustrated by Babs Webb
- Fox & Crow: A Christmas Tale (2014), illustrated by Babs Webb
- The Magic Mirror (2014)
- The Girl Who Swallowed the Sun (2014), illustrated by Bek Millhouse
- City Books
  - City Books 1: The Phoenix on Barkley Street (2014). Pictures by Enroc Illustration
  - City Books 2: Dayshaun's Gift (2015), illustrated by Alex Portal
  - City Books 3: The Ghosts in the Castle (2017), illustrated by Charity Russell
  - City Books 4: The Phantom Unicorn (2017), illustrated by Charity Russell
- A Wave Came Through Our Window (2015), illustrated by Charity Russell
- I Love Snow! (2015), illustrated by Purple Wong
- A Hand to Hold (2016), illustrated by Purple Wong
- Billie's Blues (2016), illustrated by Paul Melecky and Purple Wong
- Milo's Museum (2016), illustrated by Purple Wong
- Dragons in a Bag
  - Dragons in a Bag (2018), illustrated by Geneva B
  - The Dragon Thief (2019), illustrated by Geneva B
  - The Witch's Apprentice (2022), illustrated by Cherise Harris
- On My Block (2020), illustrated by Purple Wong
- A Place Inside of Me (2020), illustrated by Noa Denmon

=== Young Adult (YA) ===
- A Wish After Midnight (2008)
- Ship of Souls (2012)
- The Deep (2013)
- The Door at the Crossroads (2016)
- Mother of the Sea (2017)
- The Return (2018)
- Cin's Mark (2018)

=== Adult fiction ===
- One Eye Open (2011)

=== Poetry ===
- "You Can Fly", in We Rise, We Resist, We Raise Our Voices (2018), edited by Wade and Cheryl Hudson
- Say Her Name (Poems to Empower) (2020), illustrated by Loveis Wise
- American Phoenix (Poems) (2020)

=== Mixed Media ===
- Stranger In The Family (2009; a memoir in photography, poetry, and prose)

== Awards ==
- 2005: Bird (published in 2008) – New Voices Award Honor, Lee & Low Books; Ezra Jack Keats Book Award for New Illustrator; 2009 Paterson Prize for Book for Young Readers
- 2012: Ship of Souls – Booklist's Top Ten Sci-fi/Fantasy Titles for Youth; finalist for the Phillis Wheatley Book Award
- 2018: Dragon in a Bag – Amazon Best Children's Book of the Year selection
