= Mango, Abuela, and Me =

2015 children's book by Meg Medina

- Author: Meg Medina
- Illustrator: Angela Dominguez
- Language: English
- Genre: Children's books
- Published: 2015
- Publisher: Candlewick Press
- Publication place: United States
- Media type: Print
- Pages: 32 pages
- Awards: Pura Belpré Author Award Honor Book; Pura Belpré Illustrator Award Honor Book
- ISBN: 0763669008
- Preceded by: Yaqui Delgado Wants to Kick Your Ass
- Followed by: Burn Baby Burn

Mango, Abuela, and Me is a 2015 children's book written by Meg Medina and illustrated by Angela Dominguez. It was first published on August 25, 2015 through Candlewick Press and was a 2016 Belpré Honor Book. While writing the book Medina drew upon her experiences growing up with her grandmother Abuela Bena.

== Synopsis ==
Mia's grandmother (Abuela) has come to the city to live with Mia and her family. Her arrival is met with a language barrier between Mia and Abuela, as Abuela can't unlock English words and Mia has only a rudimentary knowledge of Spanish. Initially the two are unable to really connect, however as time progresses the two begin to learn each other's language by labeling each item in the house in their respective languages. Eventually Mia gets a parrot for her grandmother, which helps the two form an even stronger bond.

== Reception ==
Critical reception for the book has been positive. The New York Times wrote a favorable review for Mango, Abuela, and Me, praising Dominguez's illustrations. Publishers Weekly and Booklist also praised the work, with Booklist comparing it to Matt de la Peña’s Last Stop on Market Street.

=== Awards ===
- Pura Belpré Author Award Honor Book (2016, Meg Medina)
- Pura Belpré Illustrator Award Honor Book (2016, Angela Dominguez)
- ALSC Notable Children’s Book (2016)
- Booklist Top 10 Multicultural Fiction for Youth: 2016
