= Doug Salati =

American author and illustrator of children's books

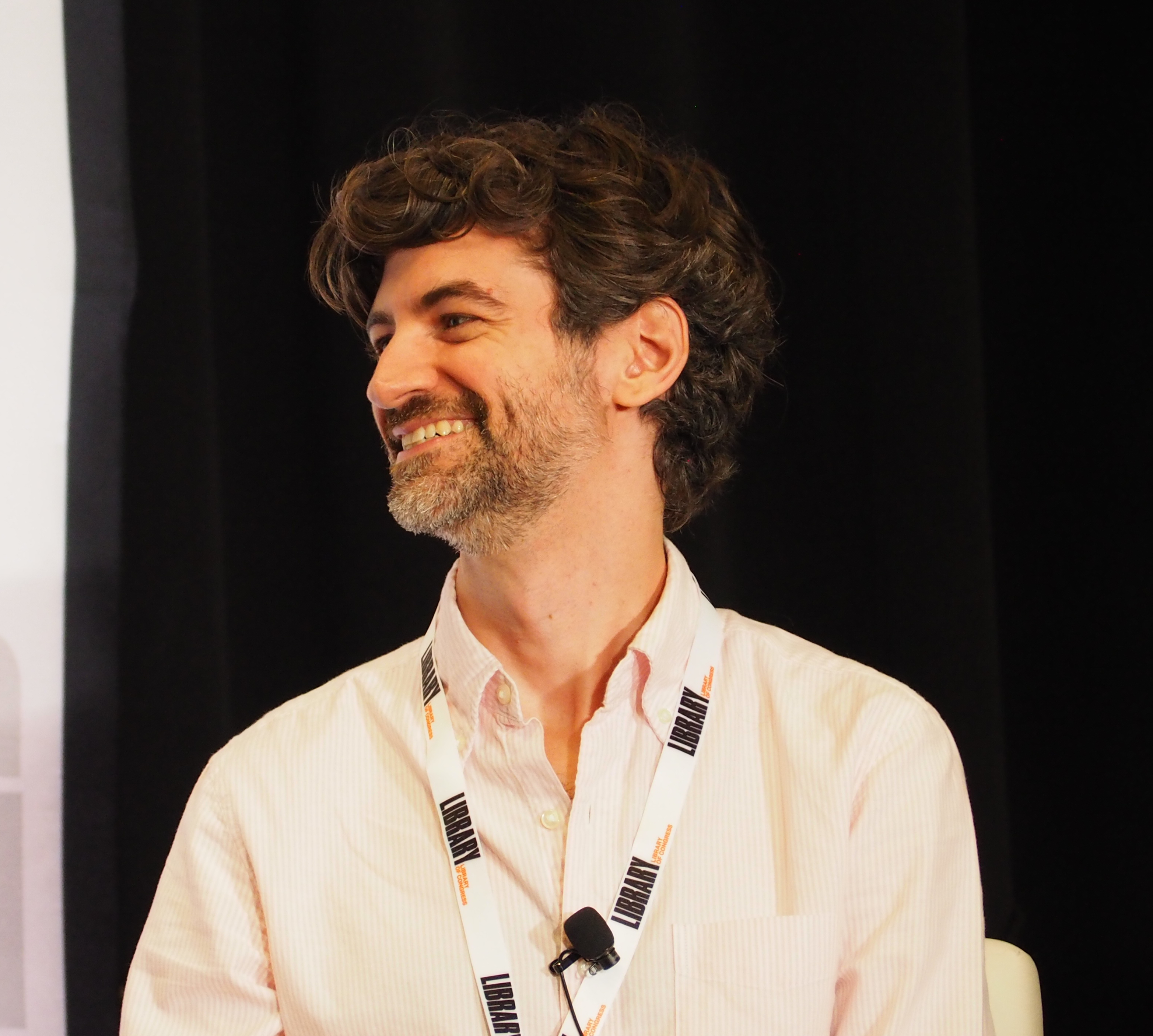
- Doug Salati reading at the 2023 National Book Festival
- Born: 1985 (age 40–41); Oneida, New York
- Occupations: Author and illustrator
- Writing career
- Genre: Children's picture books
- Notable work: Hot Dog
- Notable awards: Caldecott Medal

Doug Salati (born 1985) is an American author and illustrator of children's picture books. Salati is the creator of the picture book Hot Dog, a New York Times bestseller and recipient of the 2023 Randolph Caldecott Medal and Ezra Jack Keats Award.

== Background ==
=== Early life ===
Doug Salati was born in 1985 in Oneida, New York, to a family that encouraged his creative pursuits from a young age. Growing up, he showed a keen interest in art and illustration, spending hours drawing and sketching. As a child, Salati was fascinated by the world of children's books and was especially drawn to the works of iconic illustrators like Maurice Sendak and Tomie dePaola. He spent countless hours poring over their books, studying their techniques and dreaming of one day becoming an illustrator himself. Salati's parents, recognizing his passion and talent, encouraged him to pursue his dreams. They enrolled him in art classes and provided him with endless supplies of paper, pencils, and paints.

As he grew older, Salati's interest in illustration only deepened. He began to explore different mediums and techniques, experimenting with watercolors, ink, and digital art. He also developed a love for swimming, becoming a competitive swimmer in his teenage years.

After high school, Salati went on to study illustration at the Rochester Institute of Technology, where he honed his skills and developed his unique style. He also continued to swim competitively, balancing his artistic pursuits with his athletic passions. Upon graduating from RIT, Salati moved to New York City to pursue a Master of Fine Arts degree in Illustration as Visual Essay at the School of Visual Arts. It was during this time that he met his mentor, Tomie dePaola, who would become a significant influence on his work. After completing his MFA, Salati began teaching at the School of Visual Arts and started his career as a children's book author and illustrator. He has since become known for his whimsical and imaginative illustrations, which have captivated readers of all ages.

Currently, Salati lives and works in New York City, where he teaches and creates illustrations.

=== Education ===
Salati's educational background began with his studies in Illustration at the Rochester Institute of Technology, where he also had a notable career as a collegiate swimmer. After completing his undergraduate studies, Salati pursued a Master of Fine Arts degree in Illustration as Visual Essay at the School of Visual Arts in New York City. He graduated from the program in 2014, equipped with advanced skills and knowledge in illustration. Following his graduation, Salati began teaching at the School of Visual Arts, sharing his expertise and experience with the next generation of illustrators. He has been a member of the faculty at SVA since then, inspiring and guiding students in their own creative journeys.

Through his education and teaching experience, Salati has developed a strong foundation in illustration and visual storytelling, which he has applied to his successful career as a children's book author and illustrator.

== Career ==
Doug Salati was a 2015 Sendak Fellow. While in residence, he met Tomie dePaola, who would later become a mentor. In Salati's 2023 Caldecott Medal acceptance speech, he stated, "Tomie claimed that he couldn't figure out how to make the pictures for a manuscript he had written and asked if I wanted to give it a try. You know as well as I do that Tomie could have drawn it. He was giving me the generous gift of a direct, tangible opportunity to learn on the job."

The first book Doug Salati illustrated was In a Small Kingdom by dePaola, and his second, Lawrence in the Fall by his partner, Matthew Farina, was an Ezra Jack Keats Illustrator Award Honoree, a Society of Illustrators Original Art Show selection and Junior Library Guild Gold Standard selection.

Doug Salati has cited a variety of illustrators who have influenced his style, many of whom he encountered as a child, including Quentin Blake, Maurice Sendak, Trina Schart Hyman, John Steptoe, and Ed Young.

Salati lives and works in New York City. He works in Gowanus, Brooklyn with other picture book illustrators, including Sophie Blackall, Brian Floca, Rowboat Watkins.

== Influences ==
Salati's work is influenced by a range of sources, including Maurice Sendak, whose ability to create fantastical worlds and characters that are both whimsical and grounded in reality has been a significant inspiration. He also draws inspiration from Tomie dePaola, who taught him the importance of simplicity and clarity in illustration, and whose ability to convey complex emotions and stories through simple yet powerful images has been a lasting influence. He is also inspired by classic children's literature, such as the works of Beatrix Potter and A.A. Milne, which he admires for their timeless quality and ability to resonate with readers of all ages. He is drawn to folk art and naive art, which he appreciates for their simplicity, honesty, and emotional directness.

Nature is another significant influence on Salati's work, as he often incorporates elements of the natural world into his illustrations to convey themes and emotions. His own personal experiences and emotions also play a role in shaping his work, as he draws on his own feelings and experiences to create authentic and relatable characters and stories.

== Awards ==
- Randolph Caldecott Medal for Hot Dog
- Ezra Jack Keats Book Award for Hot Dog

== List of works ==
=== Illustrator ===
- In a Small Kingdom (by Tomie dePaola, 2018) ISBN 1481498002
- Lawrence in the Fall (by Matthew Farina, 2019) ISBN 1484780582
- Pip and Zip (by Elana Arnold, 2021) ISBN 1250796989
- The Remarkable Rescue at Milkweed Meadow (by Elaine Dimopoulos, 2023) ISBN 1623543339
- The Perilous Performance at Milkweed Meadow (by Elaine Dimopoulos, 2024) ISBN 1623544270
- Words with Wings and Magic Things (by Matthew Burgess, 2025) ISBN 1774880288

=== Author and illustrator ===
- Hot Dog (by Doug Salati, 2022) ISBN 0593308433
