= Angela Dominguez =

American children's book author and illustrator

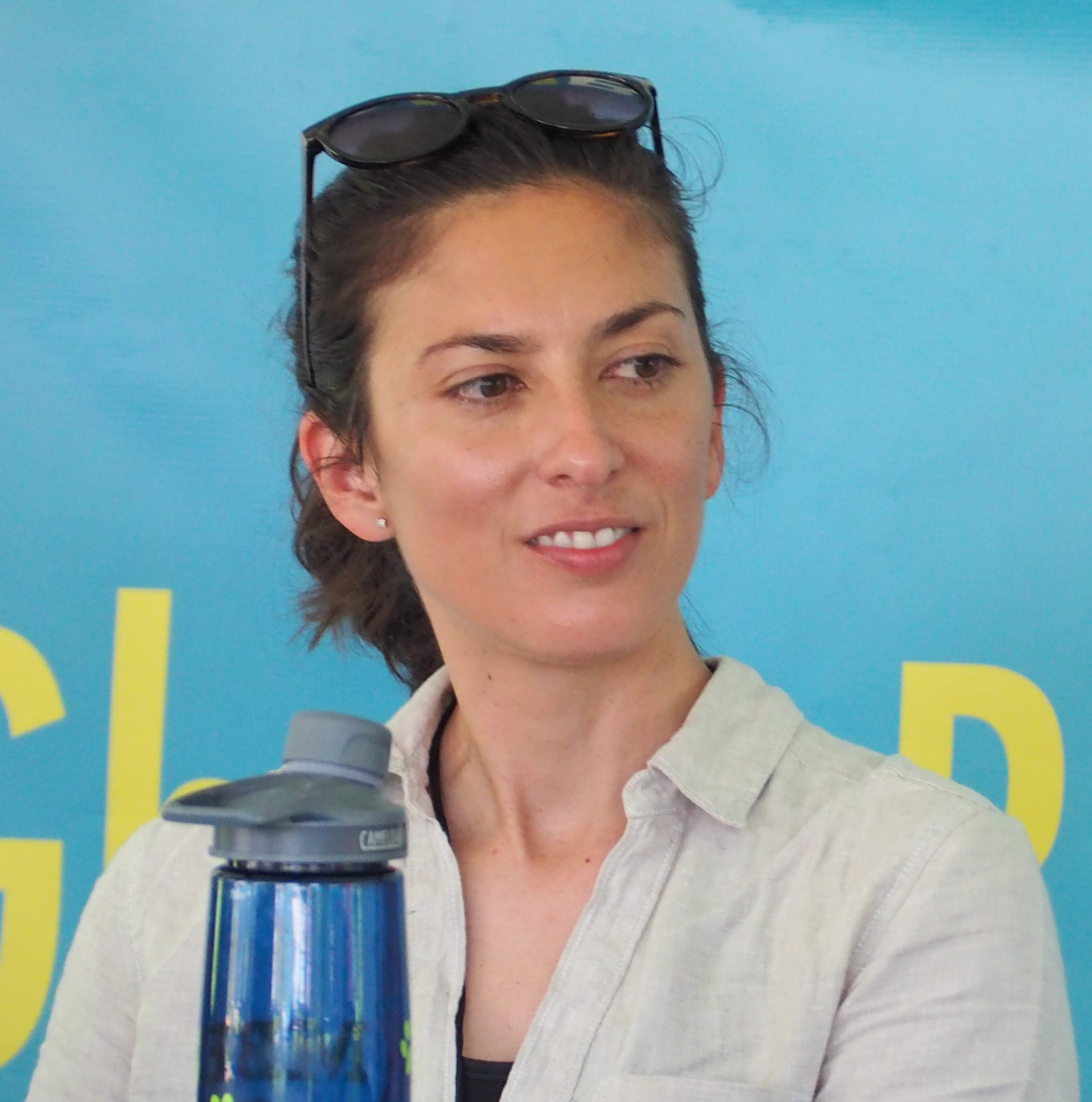
- Angela Dominguez at a book reading in 2022
- Born: 1982 (age 43–44); Mexico City, Mexico
- Education: Savannah College of Art and Design (BFA); Academy of Art University (MFA)
- Occupations: Artist, illustrator
- Writing career
- Language: English, Spanish
- Website: www.angeladominguezbooks.com

Angela Dominguez (born 1982) is an American children’s book author and illustrator. Her books use a diverse mix of Hispanic and Latino characters. She is author of the Stella Díaz series and worked with Sonia Sotomayor on the book Just Help! How to Build a Better World in 2022.

== Early life and education ==
Angela Dominguez was born in Mexico City in 1982. She moved to North Texas in 1984, and was raised there during her childhood. Angela's American English teachers discouraged her from speaking Spanish, rather than learn two languages at the same time. Speaking only English, Dominguez struggled to communicate with her only Spanish-speaking family. She early on learned to utilize writing and drawing as an effective form of communication. This inspired her passion to draw as a child. She later took Spanish classes as an adult and is now bilingual.

Dominguez attended Savannah College of Art and Design (SCAD) on a scholarship and graduated with a BFA in illustration. She then gained an MFA in illustration at the Academy of Art University. She began teaching children’s book illustration there two years later.

== Career ==
After graduating with her MFA, she wrote Maria Had a Little Llama, her own cultural take on the folk story Mary Had a Little Lamb which received the Pura Belpré Award in 2014. Dominguez aims to represent under-represented Latinx cultures in American children’s books through her fictional novels and illustrations. Writing Mary Had a Little Llama sparked Dominguez’s career in writing and illustrating children’s books. She has continued to illustrate and write children’s books, such as the Stella Diaz Series.

She has worked with authors such as Meg Medina, Marsha Diane Arnold, and Sonia Sotomayor to represent Latino/Hispanic characters and their overall culture with the intent of diversity and inclusivity in American children's books. Their book titled Just Help! How to build a Better World is a New York Times Bestseller.

Dominguez is currently a professor at the Academy of Art University. She is a member of Society of Children's Book Writers and Illustrators and PEN America.

== Awards and honours ==
- Maria had a Little Llama won the 2014 Pura Belpré Illustration Honor
- Marta Big and Small was a 2016 School Library Journal Top Latinx Book, a 2017 CCBC Choices and a 2017-2018 Read on, Wisconsin! selection
- Mango, Abuela and Me won the 2016 Pura Belpré Author Honor Book, the 2016 Pura Belpré Illustration Honor Book, and a Notable Children's Book in 2016.
- Stella Díaz Has Something To Say was a New York Public Library pick for Best Books for Kids 2018, a Chicago Public Library Best Fiction for Younger Readers of 2018, a Sid Fleischman Award winner and an American Library Association Notable book for 2019.
- Sing, Don't Cry was Virginia Reader’s Choice 2019-2020
