= Freedom Summer (disambiguation) =

Freedom Summer was a 1964 voter registration project in the U.S. state of Mississippi. It may also refer to:

- Freedom Summer (book), a 2001 children's book written by Deborah Wiles and illustrated by Jerome Lagarrigue
- Freedom Summer (film), a 2014 American documentary film by Stanley Nelson Jr
- Freedom Summer murders, the murders of Chaney, Goodman, and Schwerner in the U.S. state of Mississippi in 1964
