= Snapfinger =

Snapfinger may refer to:

- Snapfinger, Georgia, an unincorporated community in DeKalb County, Georgia, United States
- Snapfinger, Mississippi, the fictional location of Deborah Wiles' novel Each Little Bird That Sings
