= Big (book) =

2023 American picture book

- Author: Vashti Harrison
- Publisher: Little, Brown, and Company
- Publication date: May 2, 2023
- Pages: 64
- Awards: Caldecott Medal
- ISBN: 978-0-316-35322-9

Big is an American picture book written and illustrated by Vashti Harrison. It was well received, winning the 2024 Caldecott Medal and a Coretta Scott King honor for both its writing and illustrations. The book tells the story of a young black girl dealing with what it's like to be big.

== Background and publication ==
According to School Library Journal, Harrison says she wrote the book, "to say something about the adultification of young Black girls, anti-fat bias, and loving yourself. She believes the story resonates with all readers because of a sadly ubiquitous experience." Harrison began working on the book in 2019 and really focused on it after the start of the COVID-19 pandemic, with the book still taking her two and a half years to finish. Her hope was to create a book that would sit on the same shelf as other picture book classics, there to be found by girls who were like her. The book was released on May 2, 2023.

== Plot ==
The story follows the growth and development of a young black girl. She's at first happy with herself, until things start to change the day she gets stuck in a swing. "She began to feel not herself out of place exposed judged yet invisible." After further words are spoken to her, sometimes intended as advice, the girl sits sadly and cries. Finally, she is able to find a way to move forward and she returns to being a happier version of herself.

== Illustrations and themes ==
As the protagonist starts to feel the accumulations of the words used against her, the illustrations move from open to cramped on the page. Reviewers noted the prominence of pink throughout the book. The girl is the only character presented in full color with other people presented as silhouettes. Sabrina Orah Mark in The New York Times says the book, "explores how language marks the body." Writing about the girl's breakthrough in handing back the unkind words Orah Mark calls it, "a moment as small as it is gigantic, and it returns to the girl the glow that lives inside her."

== Reception and Awards ==
The book was well received getting a starred reviews from The Horn Book Magazine, Kirkus Reviews, Publishers Weekly, and School Library Journal. The book was also named one of the best children's books of 2023 by The New York Times,

Harrison was the first black woman to win the Caldecott Medal. After learning she would receive author and illustrator honor recognition from the Coretta Scott King Award she stayed up late hoping she might also get a Caldecott honor; she was completely surprised when she got the call the next morning telling her she had won the medal. The book was also a 2023 National Book Award for Young People's Literature finalist and was included in Rise: A Feminist Book Project's Top Ten of 2024.

Awards
Preceded by Hot Dog	Caldecott Medal; 2024	Succeeded by Chooch Helped
