= Burn Baby Burn (novel) =

Young adult novel by Meg Medina

- Author: Meg Medina
- Audio read by: Marisol Ramirez
- Language: English
- Genre: Young adult fiction
- Published: 2016
- Publisher: Candlewick Press
- Publication place: United States
- Media type: Print, ebook, audiobook
- Pages: 320 pages
- ISBN: 0763674672
- Preceded by: Mango, Abuela and Me

Burn Baby Burn is a 2016 young adult novel written by Cuban-American author Meg Medina. It was first published in March, 2016 through Candlewick Press and follows a young woman growing up during the summer of 1977, when the Son of Sam began targeting young women.

== Synopsis ==
It's the summer of 1977 in Queens, New York and all Nora López wants to do is get old enough to move out and live on her own. Her home life is difficult, as her father left home and remarried when she was little and will only occasionally send them money to cover the family's rent – something made more vital when Nora's mother begins to gain fewer hours at work. Nora's younger brother, Hector, is violent and abusive, as he will frequently beat both Nora and their mother whenever he gets angry. Her mother is dismissive of Hector's abuse as she feels that it is just a phase, or boys being boys and always tries to get Nora to calm Hector, to little effect. Nora is loath to let her best friend Kathleen MacInerney know exactly how bad things have gotten at home. Kathleen has a nice house and a loving family, including a firefighter father and a feminist mother. She doesn't think Kathleen will understand what she's going through, so she hides her bruises and poverty.

Things seem to get better when a cute college boy named Pablo begins working with her at the local deli and they begin dating. However, it doesn't last and paranoia and fear creep in when fires and shootings start becoming commonplace. Not only that, but Nora always has to look over her shoulder to avoid becoming a victim of the Son of Sam, a real, notorious serial killer whose real name is David Berkowitz. The Son of Sam pleaded guilty to eight separate shootings in New York.

== Development ==
While writing the novel Medina drew upon her personal experiences growing up in New York City during 1977, which she states was "just an epic year in New York City’s collective history. It felt like everything was at the brink of disaster, and yet there was this energy, this scary yet thrilling chaotic energy." This included the public's fear that anyone could be a victim of the Son of Sam, as this was prior to him being caught and identified as David Berkowitz and there was fear that he could be "anywhere and anybody". Medina chose to also feature the character of Nora experiencing second-wave feminism, commenting that she felt that it was important for modern readers to see feminism as something they could impact and appreciate. It took Medina three years to complete the book, half of which was spent writing and the other was spent editing and fine-tuning. As she was only thirteen when Berkowitz was captured and arrested in 1977, Medina conducted extensive research and interviewed people who were teens or adults during that point in time.

== Reception ==
Burn Baby Burn received starred reviews from Kirkus, Booklist, Horn Book, and School Library Journal, as well as positive reviews from Publishers Weekly.

Kirkus, School Library Journal, BookPage, and Horn Book named it one of the best books of 2016.

Awards
Year	Awards	Result
2016	National Book Award for Literature for Young People	Longlist
2016	Kirkus Prize	Finalist
2017	Los Angeles Times Book Prize	Finalist
2017	Amelia Bloomer Book List	Top Ten
2017	YALSA's Best Fiction for Young Adults	Top Ten
2017	YALSA's Quick Picks for Reluctant Readers	Nominee
