= The Girl Who Could Silence the Wind =

2012 novel by Meg Medina

- Author: Meg Medina
- Language: English
- Published: 2012, Candlewick Press
- Publication place: United States
- Media type: Print, ebook, audiobook
- Pages: 256 pages
- ISBN: 0763664197
- Preceded by: Tía Isa Wants a Car
- Followed by: Yaqui Delgado Wants to Kick Your Ass

The Girl Who Could Silence the Wind is a 2013 young adult novel by Cuban-American author Meg Medina. The book was first published on 13 March 2012 through Candlewick Press and follows Sonia Ocampo, a teenage girl that leaves home to seek her freedom but finds that she cannot leave her past behind her.

== Synopsis ==
Sonia Ocampo has always grown up with people expecting great things from her. She was born in the small town of Tres Montes, Chile during a terrible storm that threatened to completely destroy everything, only for it to stop soon after she was born. This has caused the townspeople to believe that Sonia is capable of fulfilling any wish if she prays hard enough and as a result she spends her days deep in prayer, as she herself believes in the power of her prayers. One day one of her prayers goes unanswered, showing that neither Sonia or her prayers are magical. This realization causes her to quickly leave town to avoid bringing shame to her family, and Sonia manages to get a housekeeping job in a wealthy home in Santiago, where Sonia is seen as no different than any of the other maids. However while the big city is exciting and Sonia's lodgings are far more nice than her former home, Sonia finds herself the target of her supervisor (who picks at everything Sonia does) and the nephew of Sonia's boss (who views her as nothing more than a conquest to be won). Soon Sonia learns that her brother Rafael has gone missing shortly after he left Tres Montes, and Sonia must seek help from her old friend Pancho in order to discover what happened to her brother.

== Reception ==
Critical reception for The Girl Who Could Silence the Wind has been positive. Publishers Weekly and the Palm Beach Daily News both praised the work, and the Palm Beach Daily News described it as "Sweet, well-thought and nutritious without pomp, it's a discovery worth making." The Irish Times also praised the work, stating that it could "serve as an introduction to Latin American magic realism for teen readers."

=== Awards ===
- Bank Street College of Education's "Best Children's Books of the Year: Twelve to Fourteen", 2013
- Latino Book Award for Best Young Adult Fiction Book (second place) (2014, won)
