= Taeeun Yoo =

South Korean Writer and Illustrator of Children's books

- Born: Seoul, South Korea
- Occupations: Author, illustrator
- Writing career
- Language: Korean, English
- Genre: Picture Books
- Notable awards: Ezra Jack Keats Book Award (2010)
- Website: taeeunyoo.com

Taeeun Yoo is a South Korean picture book author and illustrator who is active in the United States. Her first picture book, The Little Red Fish, won the Society of Illustrators’ 2007 Founder's Award, and Only a Witch Can Fly (2009) was named a New York Times Best Picture Book and won the Ezra Jack Keats Book Award in 2010.

== Life ==
Yoo was born in Seoul, though later immigrated to the United States.

She studied oriental painting at Hongik University. After attended the Bologna Children's Book Fair in Italy, she became fascinated with illustration, later receiving a Master of Fine Arts in Illustration as Visual Essay from the School of Visual Arts.

Influenced by etcher Bruce Waldman during her graduate studies, Yoo worked on her first book, visited several publishers to show her work, and regularly sent out advertising cards. Thanks to such efforts, she was contacted by Dial Books for Young Readers after her graduation exhibition, and her thesis project, The Little Red Fish, was published in the United States in 2007, a year after her graduation.

== Career ==
Yoo's first picture book, The Little Red Fish, was published in the United States and subsequently translated and published in South Korea, Australia, Japan, and Spain. The book received the 2007 Founder's Award from the American Society of Illustrators. In 2009, her picture book Only a Witch Can Fly, with text by Alison McGee, was named a New York Times Best Picture Book of 2010, and won the Ezra Jack Keats Book Award for New Illustrator in 2010. Her 2015 book Strictly No Elephants has been translated into 13 languages and is heralded as a pitch-perfect book about inclusion. Kitten and the Night Watchman was named a Best Picture Book of the Year by the Boston Globe, Kirkus Reviews, and Publishers Weekly. Other books she has written and illustrated include You Are a Lion! And Other Fun Yoga Poses and Love Makes a Garden Grow.

== Style ==
Yoo uses a variety of techniques for her work. Her first picture book, The Little Red Fish, was created using etching with aquatint. In The Little Red Fish, only the red fish and the red covers of the book are hand-colored. By 2009, Yoo progressed to using linoleum block prints to print images on paper with ink, and then drawing on it with pencil. She sometimes uses Photoshop to adjust the colors when finishing up. She created Kitten and the Night Watchman (2018) entirely digitally. For When the Storm Comes (2020), she manipulated block print textures digitally, and drew pencil and charcoal lines on separate sheets of paper, which she then combined in Photoshop. Regarding such changes in technique, Yoo has said, "It all depends on what is most effective and what is most fun for me to work with."

== Awards and honors ==
=== Books written ===
The Little Red Fish won the 2007 Society of Illustrators' Founder's Award.

=== Books illustrated ===
Two of the books Yoo illustrated are Junior Library Guild selections: Round (2017) and Kitten and the Night Watchman (2019). Two books have been included on CCBC Choices lists: Hands Say Love (2015) and Round (2018).

In 2008, Time included Shirin Bridges's The Umbrella Queen on their list of the top ten children's books of the year. The following year, The New York Times named Alison McGhee's Only a Witch Can Fly one of the year's best children's books; Bank Street College of Education included it on their 2010 list. The same year, McGhee's So Many Days was a Kids' Indie Next List pick. In 2014, The New York Times named Polly Kanevsky's Here Is the Baby one of the top ten best illustrated children's books of the year. In 2017, Kirkus Reviews and School Library Journal named Joyce Sidman's Round one of the best picture books of the year.

Awards for Yoo's illustrations
Year	Title	Award	Result	Ref.
2007	The Little Red Fish	Society of Illustrators' Founder's Award	Winner	
2010	Only a Witch Can Fly by Alison McGhee	Ezra Jack Keats Book Award for Illustrator	Winner	
2016	Strictly No Elephants by Lisa Mantchev	Charlotte Huck Award	Honor	
2018	Round by Joyce Sidman	Charlotte Zolotow Award	Commended	

== Works ==
=== As author and illustrator ===
- The Little Red Fish (Dial Books for Young Readers, 2007, ISBN 978-0803731455)
- You Are a Lion! And Other Fun Yoga Poses (Nancy Paulsen Books, 2012, ISBN 978-0399256028)
- Love Makes a Garden Grow (Simon & Schuster/Paula Wiseman Books, 2023, ISBN 978-1534442863)

=== As illustrator ===
- A Wrinkle in Time Quintet, written by Madeleine L’Engle (Square Fish, 2007)
- The Umbrella Queen, written by Shirin Bridges (Greenwillow Books, 2008, ISBN 978-0060750404)
- Only a Witch Can Fly, written by Alison McGhee (Feiwel & Friends, 2009, ISBN 978-0312375034)
- So Many Days, written by Alison McGhee (Atheneum Books for Young Readers, 2010, ISBN 978-1416958574 )
- The Austin Family Chronicles, written by Madeleine L’Engle (Square Fish, 2011)
- Tua and the Elephant, written by R. P. Harris (Chronicle Books, 2012, ISBN 978-1452127033)
- Hands Say Love, written by George Shannon (Little, Brown Books for Young Readers, 2014, ISBN 978-0316084796)
- Here Is the Baby, written by Polly Kanevsky (Schwartz & Wade, 2014, ISBN 978-0375867316)
- Strictly No Elephants, written by Lisa Mantchev (Simon & Schuster/Paula Wiseman Books, 2015, ISBN 978-1481416474)
- Round, written by Joyce Sidman (Clarion Books, 2017, ISBN 978-0544387614)
- Kitten and the Night Watchman, written by John Sullivan (Simon & Schuster/Paula. Wiseman Books, 2018, ISBN 978-1534480421)
- When the Storm Comes, written by Linda Ashman (Nancy Paulsen Books, 2020, ISBN 978-0399546099)
