= Tía Isa Wants a Car =

2011 children's book by Meg Medina

- Author: Meg Medina
- Illustrator: Claudio Muñoz
- Cover artist: Claudio Muñoz
- Language: English
- Genre: Children's fiction
- Published: 2011, Candlewick Press
- Publication place: United States
- Media type: Print
- Pages: 32 pages
- Awards: Ezra Jack Keats New Writers Award
- ISBN: 0763641561
- Preceded by: Milagros: Girl from Away
- Followed by: The Girl Who Could Silence the Wind

Tía Isa Wants a Car is a 2011 illustrated children's book by Cuban-American author Meg Medina. It was first published on 14 June 2011 through Candlewick Press and has won the 2012 Ezra Jack Keats New Writers Award. The book focuses on the title character of Isa, a young woman that wants to save money towards a new car while also thinking of family in other countries that could also use the money.

== Synopsis ==
The book follows the character of Tía (Aunt) Isa, a young immigrant woman that works in a bakery, and is narrated through the viewpoint of her niece, to whom Tía Isa tells tales of her former home and her desire for their family members to join them. Tía Isa is saving her money towards purchasing a beautiful green car that she can use to drive herself and her niece to the beach, but this is difficult to do when she has to send much of her money home to help her family reach North America. Try as hard as she might, both goals seem like they will take an extremely long amount of time to come to fruition and Tía Isa's niece begins to secretly raise funds by taking on several jobs throughout the neighborhood.

== Reception ==
Critical reception for Tía Isa Wants a Car has been positive, and the Chicago Tribune commented that the desired car "represents a dream achieved". A reviewer for the Daily Herald praised the book for showing how saving money can make a difference as well as focusing on the message of familial love.

=== Awards ===
- Ezra Jack Keats New Writers Award (2012, won)
- Notable Children's Book (2012, YALSA)
- The Amelia Bloomer Book List (2012)
