= Robert Weinstock =

American children's book author and illustrator

- Born: April 8, 1967 (age 59); Pennsylvania, U.S.
- Education: Stanford University
- Occupation: Writer
- Spouse: Dana Stevens
- Children: Alice (Pearl) Weinstock
- Writing career
- Pen name: Rowboat Watkins
- Language: English
- Period: 2004 – current
- Genres: Children's books, literature
- Website: www.rowboatwatkins.com

Robert Weinstock (born April 8, 1967, in Philadelphia) is an American children's book author and illustrator. Some of his books were published under the pseudonym of Rowboat Watkins.

== Awards ==
In 2010 he received the Sendak fellowship. His book Rude Cakes won an Ezra Jack Keats Honor in 2016. Pete With No Pants was reviewed by Kate Quealy-Gainer who writes that it is a lovely, absurd little tale with humor both "jubilant and sardonic" and "it's bound to be a familiar situation to many a carefree, nudist kid and their exasperated, clothes-demanding parent".

== Accident ==
On October 7, 2003, Weinstock was hit by a truck resulting in serious injuries and loss of much of his ability to taste. An article in The New York Times detailed his experiences.

== Published works ==
- Gordimer Byrd's Reminder (2004)
- Giant Meatball (2008)
- Food Hates You, Too and Other Poems (2009)
- Can You Dig It? (2010)
- Rude Cakes (2015) (as "Rowboat Watkins")
  - translation: Le petit gâteau qui ne disait pas merci (2015) (as "Rowboat Watkins")
- Pete With No Pants (2017). (as "Rowboat Watkins")
  - translation: Bu chuan ku zi de pi te (2018) (as "Rowboat Watkins")
- Big Bunny (2018) (as "Rowboat Watkins")
- Most Marshmallows (2019) (as "Rowboat Watkins")
- Mabel : a Mermaid Fable (2020) (as "Rowboat Watkins")

== Illustrated works ==
- I'm Not (2010)
- Tiny Cedric by Sally Lloyd Jones (as "Rowboat Watkins")
