= Phoebe Wahl =

American painter

- Education: Rhode Island School of Design
- Known for: illustration, sculpting, animation
- Website: www.phoebewahl.com

Phoebe Wahl is an illustrator, sculptor and children's book author from the United States. She is the author of Sonya's Chickens, for which she earned the Ezra Jack Keats Book Award for New Illustrator and a Kirkus Star. Her primary media are watercolor, collage and fabric sculpture. Wahl's work deals with "themes of comfort, nostalgia and intimacy with nature and one another".

Wahl grew up an unschooled child in Washington state and pursued her interest in drawing. While a student at the Rhode Island School of Design she began to focus on children's books and created early drafts of Sonya's Chickens. She graduated from RISD in 2013 with a Bachelor of Fine Arts degree in Illustration.

In addition to children's content, Wahl is an adjunct professor at Western Washington University, teaching illustration and design. She is a contributor to Taproot Magazine and also creates personal work including a zine about her complex experience with miscarriage, illustrations inspired by her passion for women's issues, and reactions to world events such as the 2016 United States presidential election. Wahl currently resides in Bellingham, Washington.

== Bibliography ==
- Sonya's Chickens (2015)
- Backyard Fairies (2018)
- The Blue House (2020)
- Little Witch Hazel (2021)
- Phoebe's Diary (2023)

=== As contributor ===
- Jenny Volvovski, Julia Rothman, and Matt Lamothe, The Who, the What, and the When: 65 Artists Illustrate the Secret Sidekicks (2014) ISBN 9781452137230
