= Vashti Harrison =

American writer, illustrator and filmmaker born 1988)

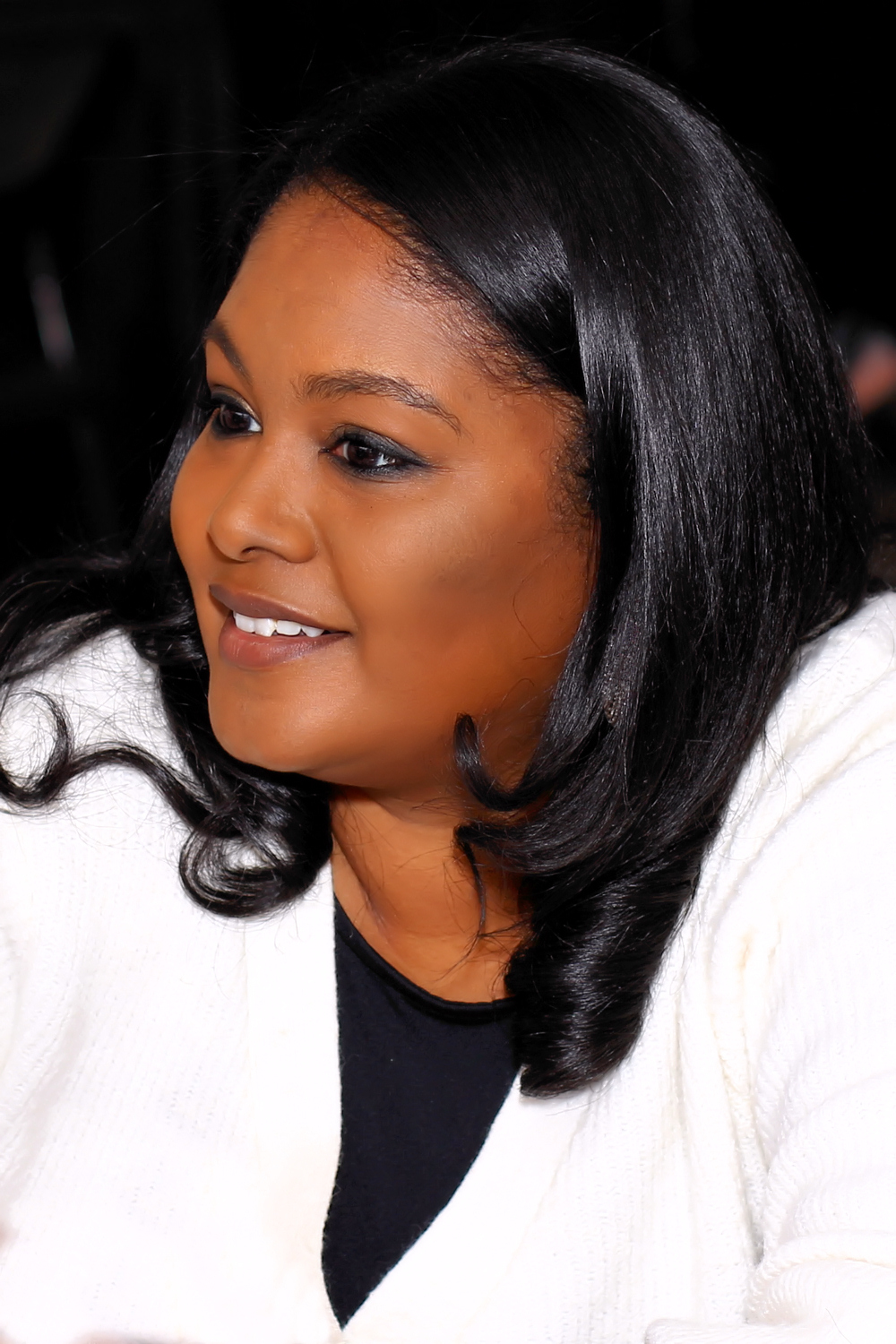
- Harrison at the 2023 Texas Book Festival
- Born: 1988 (age 37–38)
- Education: University of Virginia (BA); California Institute of the Arts (MFA)
- Known for: Illustration
- Awards: Caldecott Medal (2024)

Vashti Harrison (born 1988) is an American writer, illustrator and filmmaker based in Brooklyn, New York. Her book, Big, received the 2024 Randolph Caldecott Medal. She was born in Virginia and her films and other artworks are rooted in Caribbean heritage and folklore.

== Early life ==
Harrison was born in 1988 to an African American father and an Indian mother, who is from Trinidad and Tobago. She was in TAG (Talented and Gifted) and was described as a "quiet and polite student" by her TAG teacher Ms. Corson. She went to Nandua Middle in ACPS. She earned her BA in 2010 from the University of Virginia as a double major in Media Studies and Studio Art with concentrations in Film and Cinematography. She held the Aunspaugh 5th Year Fellowship in the McIntire Department of Art in 2010. She then went on to receive an MFA in Film and Video from California Institute of Arts in 2014, where she attended Disney and DreamWorks Animation classes.

== Career ==
=== Films ===
Harrison's films are experimental and rooted in Caribbean heritage and folklore. Her films have been screened at the New York Film Festival, Rotterdam International Film Festival and Edinburgh International Film Festival. She uses public appearances to offer advice for aspiring artists.

- Field Notes (2014) is a visual guide to the spiritual culture of Trinidad and Tobago. Harrison shares her own stories about shape-shifters and bloodsuckers, alongside the ghosts of the islands' past. In 2014 it won Best Local Short Film at the Trinidad and Tobago Film Festival. It was nominated for the Best Short Film at the 2015 Edinburgh International Film Festival.
- Sixteen (2015) the coming-of-age story of Harrison's mother; a metamorphosis from a difficult childhood to beautiful adulthood. It premiered at the Trinidad and Tobago Film Festival in 2015, where it was nominated for Best Short Film.
- Forged from the Love of Liberty (2016) is a poem about curses and superstitions, named after the anthem of Trinidad and Tobago.
- Harrison worked as a character designer on Hair Love (2019), a Pixar-style animated short which celebrates a positive black father-daughter relationships through the usage of black hair. The film received $284,000 Kickstarter funding, after a campaign headed by NFL wide receiver Matthew Cherry. Hair Love won Best Animated Short Film at the 92nd Academy Awards. Harrison also illustrated a children's book based on the film.

=== Illustration and books ===
Harrison used Instagram to get her first artistic commissions, through this meeting Apple which led to live drawing on iPads in New York. She was inspired to create children's picture books after moving back to Trinidad and Tobago. In 2016 Harrison attended the SCBWI Mid-Atlantic Conference, where she entered and won a drawing competition "Draw This!" to have her illustration shared to all their industry partners. This was the beginning of her illustrating and writing career - two months later, she had an agent - Simon & Schuster. Harrison illustrated Surishtha and Kabir Sehgal's Festival of Colours, the story of Holi, released in 2018. Her illustrations also appear in Cece Loves Science by Kimberly Derting and Shelli R Johannes. Her book (as illustrator) Sulwe won a 2020 NAACP Image Award for Outstanding Literary Work - Children category. In 2024, her book (as author and illustrator), Big, was awarded the Randolph Caldecott Medal.

==== Little Leaders series ====
The bestselling book Little Leaders: Bold Women in Black History tells the story of 40 African-American women who shaped history. Harrison says that she was inspired during Black History Month, when she began to illustrate and write about black women from American history. The book was picked up by the publishers LittleBrown Books, and has both a UK (March 2018) and US (Dec 2017) version. The book includes the stories of Mae Jemison, Katherine Johnson, Maya Angelou and Alice Bell. It was nominated for an NAACP Image Award before it was released. In January 2018 Vashti Harrison appeared on the Daily Show to discuss Little Leaders.
