= Freedom School, Yes! =

2001 picture book by Amy Littlesugar

- Author: Amy Littlesugar
- Illustrator: Floyd Cooper
- Language: English
- Subject: Children's literature, picture book, African-American history
- Published: 2001 (Philomel Books)
- Publication place: United States
- Media type: Print (hardback, paperback)
- Pages: 32 (unpaginated)
- ISBN: 9780399230066
- OCLC: 42649627

Freedom School, Yes! is a 2001 children's picture book by Amy Littlesugar and illustrated by Floyd Cooper. It is about Jolie, a young girl, and her family's involvement with the 1964 Mississippi Summer Project.

== Reception ==
The School Library Journal, in a review of Freedom School, Yes!, wrote "Littlesugar has created a slice-of-life story with a potent message. .. The illustrations are masterful and lush. .. A unique and poignant look at a moment in history."

Freedom School, Yes! has also been reviewed by Horn Book Guide Reviews, Booklist, Kirkus Reviews, and Publishers Weekly,

It is a 2002 National Council of Teachers of English Adventuring with Books book and a 2002 Notable Social Studies Trade Book for Young People.

== See also ==
- Freedom Summer (book)
