= Chooch Helped =

2024 picture book

- Book cover
- Author: Andrea L. Rogers
- Illustrator: Rebecca Lee Kunz
- Language: English
- Genre: Children's literature
- Publication date: 2024
- Publication place: United States
- Pages: 48
- ISBN: 9781646144549

Chooch Helped is a 2024 picture book about a brother and sister in Cherokee society who struggle to get along. The book was written by Andrea L. Rogers and illustrated by Rebecca Lee Kunz, both citizens of Cherokee Nation. It was awarded the 2025 Caldecott Medal.

== Description ==
Set in Oklahoma, the story depicts an older sister, Sissy, and her annoying younger brother called Chooch (a common nickname based on the Cherokee word for boy). Though Sissy is angry at Chooch for making messes, ruining her clay pots, or ripping the plants out of her aunt's garden, the children's parents remind her, "Chooch learns by watching. You’re one of his most important teachers." Chooch joins Oginalii one night to go hunting for crawdads, an activity known as gigging, and Chooch helps by catching them with his bare hands.

Andrea L. Rogers wrote the book while she was a PhD candidate in English at the University of Arkansas. She previously published the children's books Mary and the Trail of Tears (2020) and Man Made Monsters (2024). Among the picture books that have influenced her are childhood favorites like Harry the Dirty Dog, Where the Wild Things Are, The Snowy Day and Make Way for Ducklings, as well as newer books that her children enjoy, like This Is Not My Hat. She said, "I love anything by Jerry Pinkney or Carole Boston Weatherford."

Chooch Helped was the first children's book illustrated by the artist Rebecca Lee Kunz, who worked in fine art for 20 years. When the book won the 2025 Caldecott Medal, Kunz expressed awe, and said that winning the award was "wild and incredibly unusual and atypical". Kunz used a warm color palette and earth tones to evoke Oklahoma, where both she and Rogers grew up. She created layered illustrations with collaging, painting, and line work. Kunz and Rogers originally met at an event for the Cherokee National Holiday in 2022.

Chooch Helped was published by Levine Querido, a publisher founded in 2019.

Awards
| Preceded by Big | Caldecott Medal; 2025 | Succeeded by Fireworks |
