= Noa Denmon =

American illustrator

- Born: 1995 or 1996 (age 30–31); Pittsburgh, Pennsylvania, U.S.
- Education: University of the Arts
- Occupation: Illustrator
- Notable work: A Place Inside of Me
- Awards: Caldecott Honor; 2021
- Website: noadenmon.com

Noa Denmon (born 1995 or 1996) is an American illustrator. She received a Caldecott Honor in 2021 for illustrating the picture book A Place Inside of Me, written by Zetta Elliott.

== Early life and education ==
Denmon was born in Greenfield, a neighborhood of Pittsburgh, Pennsylvania, in 1995 or 1996. She attended the Pittsburgh Creative and Performing Arts School, where she developed an interest in the visual arts and graduated in 2014. After high school, she studied at the University of the Arts in Philadelphia, receiving a Bachelor of Fine Arts degree in 2018 and a master's degree in art education in 2019.

== Career ==
In 2019, Denmon illustrated the picture book A Place Inside of Me, written by Zetta Elliott and published by Farrar, Straus and Giroux in July 2020. Denmon received a Caldecott Honor on January 25, 2021, for her illustrations for the book, which depict a Black child's reaction to the police killing a girl in his community. Denmon initially created a young female protagonist for the first-person narrator; after further deliberations with Elliott, the protagonist was modified to be an older boy. Denmon's artwork, which was in shades of blue, pale yellow, and mauve, was received positively by critics. A reviewer for Publishers Weekly praised Denmon's "textured, dynamic illustrations" of a diverse Black community and her depictions of influential Black figures throughout history.

She was invited by Google to illustrate the Google Doodle for Martin Luther King Jr. Day in 2021. The finished doodle, which was featured on Google's homepage on January 18, 2021, was a juxtaposition of two scenes: one in black and white featuring people from the 1960s listening to Martin Luther King Jr. speak, and the other in color showing people in modern times who are creating a mural of events from King's life while socially distanced due to the COVID-19 pandemic. It was inspired by the George Floyd protests in 2020 and Denmon's experiences as a Black woman.

In addition to her work on A Place Inside of Me and the covers of other children's books, Denmon has designed illustrations for The New York Times, The Washington Post, and The Marshall Project. She is attached as the illustrator for Wall of Respect, a picture book by Jabari Asim that is scheduled for publication by Penguin Books.

Denmon illustrated the 2025 children's book by Connie and Peter Roop entitled Maya Angelou Finds Her Voice, which Publishers Weekly described as a "sensitively rendered biography of Maya Angelou".

== Personal life ==
As of 2021, Denmon lives in Wilkinsburg, Pennsylvania.
