= Milagros: Girl from Away =

2008 novel by Meg Medina

- Author: Meg Medina
- Language: English
- Genre: Children's fiction
- Published: 2008, Henry Holt and Company
- Publication place: United States
- Media type: Print, e-book
- Pages: 288 pages
- ISBN: 0805082301
- Followed by: Tía Isa Wants a Car

Milagros: Girl from Away is a 2008 children's novel by Cuban-American author Meg Medina. It was first published on 11 November 2008 through Henry Holt and Company and follows a young girl who has to deal with various struggles, including an absentee father. The book took Medina about eighteen months to write.

== Synopsis ==
After Milagros de le Torre's father ran off to join a band of pirates, Milagros has to put up with constant teasing and her family has had much trouble trying to make ends meet. Despite these troubles, Milagros truly loves her Caribbean home and as such is traumatized when invaders storm her tiny island's shores and kill everyone in sight. Milagros manages to escape by way of a small dinghy and ends up landing in coastal Maine, where she is seen as an oddity. She's taken in by a family, but at the same time Milagros struggles to come to terms with her own cultural identity and the meaning of family.

== Reception ==
Critical reception for Milagros: Girl from Away has been positive. The Horn Book Guide praised the work, writing "Medina's use of magical realism keeps readers tantalizingly off-balance as she navigates among settings. Her language, too, is as changeable as the sea, sometimes lulling readers with gentle alliteration and flowing metaphor, other times jolting them with menacing foreshadowing and sharp dialogue." The Bulletin of the Center for Children's Books also wrote a favorable review, recommending the book to "readers who are looking for something original, something wistful, and something strange, in a good way." Kliatt wrote that "Touches of the magical make this story enchanting and the lyrical style draws readers into the story."
