= Hot Dog (book) =

2022 children's picture book by Doug Salati

- Author: Doug Salati
- Illustrator: Doug Salati
- Language: English
- Genre: Children's picture book
- Publisher: Random House Children's Books
- Publication date: 24 May 2022
- Publication place: United States
- Pages: 40
- Awards: Caldecott Medal
- ISBN: 9780593308455

Hot Dog is a 2022 children's picture book written and illustrated by Doug Salati. It was awarded as a winner of the Caldecott Medal in 2023.

== Reception ==
Hot Dog was well received by critics, including starred reviews from Publishers Weekly.

Elizabeth A. Harris writing for The New York Times also reviewed the book.

== Awards and honors ==
Hot Dog was a winner of the 2023 Caldecott Medal for children's books. The Association for Library Service to Children also named it one of the year's Notable Children's Books.

Awards
Preceded by Watercress	Caldecott Medal recipient 2023	Succeeded by Big
