= A Place Inside of Me =

2020 picture book written by Zetta Elliott, illustrated by Noa Denmon

- Author: Zetta Elliott
- Illustrator: Noa Denmon
- Publisher: Farrar, Straus and Giroux, an imprint of Macmillian
- Publication date: July 21, 2020
- Awards: Caldecott Honor
- ISBN: 978-0-374-38863-8
- OCLC: 1176354907

A Place Inside of Me: A Poem to Heal the Heart is a 2020 picture book written by Zetta Elliott and illustrated by Noa Denmon. Written in verse, it explores the emotions of a young Black boy after a girl in his community is killed by police. The book was published by Farrar, Straus and Giroux on July 21, 2020. Critics praised its accessible approach to serious topics including police brutality and the Black Lives Matter movement, as well as its illustrations, for which Denmon received a 2021 Caldecott Honor.

== Synopsis ==
A young Black boy describes "a place inside of me" that holds all of his emotions, such as happiness as he plays basketball with his friends. He feels sorrowful one day when he is at a barbershop and the news on the television reports that a girl has been shot by the police. Later, the boy is afraid when he sees the light from a police siren outside his home, and angry as protestors holding Black Lives Matter signs face off against the police. He feels a yearning to be free, pride in his heritage, and peace as he meditates with his classmates. Finally, he feels compassion and hope as he attends a candlelight vigil, and love for his community. Reflecting on all of his emotions that he has experienced throughout the year, the boy resolves to love himself most of all.

== Background and publication ==
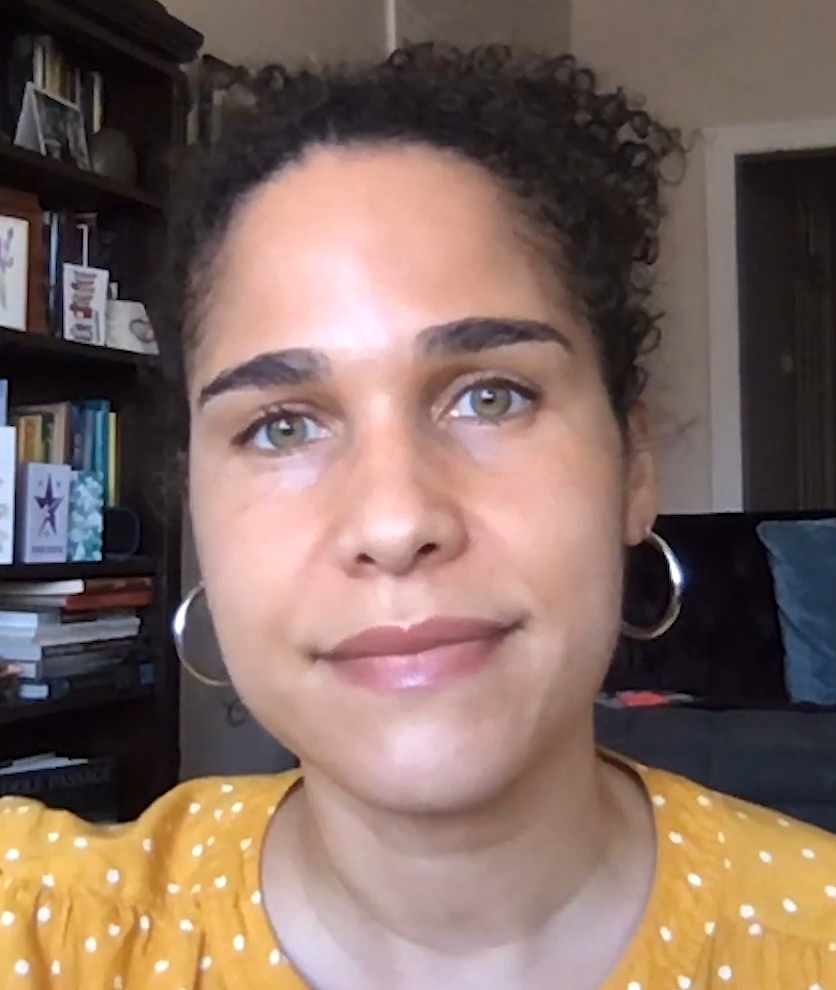
Zetta Elliott in 2021

In an essay for The Horn Book Magazine, the Canadian-American poet Zetta Elliott wrote that she composed the poem that forms the basis of A Place Inside of Me twenty years before the book was published. In the aftermath of the killings of Alton Sterling and Philando Castle in July 2016, she decided to turn the poem into a children's book. In 2019, she worked with the American illustrator Noa Denmon to develop the imagery for the book. Denmon initially created a younger female protagonist for the first-person narrator; after further deliberations with Elliott, the protagonist was modified to be an older boy. The book's illustrations are in shades of blue, pale yellow, and mauve.

The book was published by Farrar, Straus and Giroux on July 21, 2020. Elliott dedicated it to the nephew of Atatiana Jefferson, a Black woman who was shot and killed in her home by a policeman in Fort Worth, Texas, in October 2019.

== Reception ==
Denmon received a 2021 Caldecott Honor for her illustrations. A Place Inside of Me was recognized as a notable poetry book of 2021 by the National Council of Teachers of English (NCTE). A reviewer for Language Arts, a journal published by the NCTE, wrote that "the poem and artwork will speak to all ages", favorably comparing Elliott's poem to jazz and applauding Denmon's "street-inspired art". The book was similarly praised by other critics. Several reviewers commented that it would be an effective aid for starting discussions about police brutality and the Black Lives Matter movement with younger children. Michelle H. Martin, writing for The Horn Book Magazine, described the book as a "well-crafted, twenty-first-century love poem" and applauded its positivity given the serious subject matter. A reviewer for Publishers Weekly praised Denmon's "textured, dynamic illustrations" of a diverse Black community and her depictions of influential Black figures throughout history.
