= Merci Suárez Changes Gears =

2018 book by Meg Medina

- Author: Meg Medina
- Language: English
- Genre: children's literature
- Publisher: Candlewick Press
- Publication date: September 11, 2018
- Publication place: United States
- Pages: 355
- Awards: Newbery Medal (2019)
- ISBN: 978-0-06-269120-0

Merci Suárez Changes Gears is a 2018 children's book (based on a short story from Flying Lessons and Other Stories) written by Meg Medina. Mercedes "Merci" Suárez, the eponymous heroine, is a sixth grade scholarship student at an elite private school in South Florida. The novel details her struggles at school and home. The novel was awarded the 2019 Newbery Medal.

== Plot summary ==
Merci Suárez is a Cuban-American student starting the sixth grade (her second year) at Seaward Pines Academy, which she and her older brother Roli attend on scholarship. Merci mentors new student Michael Clark for the "Sunshine Buddies" program as part of her scholarship obligation. Michael draws the interest of fellow student and mean girl Edna Santos, adding to the pressure on Merci at school. The Suárez family lives as an extended group in three neighboring houses: one for Merci, Roli, and their parents; another for Merci's tía Inés, who runs a bakery while raising young twin sons Axel and Tomás; and the third for her Abuela and Abuelo, Lolo, who has always been in charge of walking the children home from school.

Merci Suarez never realized that 6th grade would be so hard–even with a scientific genius for a brother. That was before she met Edna Santos, started babysitting her cousins, became a Sunshine Buddy, and to top it all off, her grandfather (Lolo), her main supporter, has Alzheimer's disease. Merci is also a budding soccer champion, who is so good, that she can “Play for za Feefa” says Simon (one of her dad’s football friends). She might even dare to try out for the school team–if only her mom would sign the permission form. There is only one thing that Merci has wanted for the longest time; a new bike. To get it, she saves up money to buy it, but bikes are getting more expensive, and her family is not rich at all. All this, with her grandfather’s sickness, and mean Edna and her “swarm of cawing crows” is building the pressure on Merci Suarez. Will she survive the sixth grade?

== Development ==
Medina drew on her own experience growing up near her extended family as well as the history of her mother's cousins, who lived in three neighboring houses in Florida. Medina's experience in caring for her elderly mother, mother-in-law, and aunt also contributed to the realistic portrayal of aging in the novel.

== Reception ==
The novel received starred reviews from Kirkus Reviews, The Horn Book, Publishers Weekly, and School Library Journal.

At its annual meeting in January 2019, the American Library Association awarded the Newbery Medal to Merci Suárez Changes Gears.

Awards
Preceded by Hello, Universe	Newbery Medal recipient 2019	Succeeded by New Kid
