= Meg Medina =

American children's writer (born 1963)

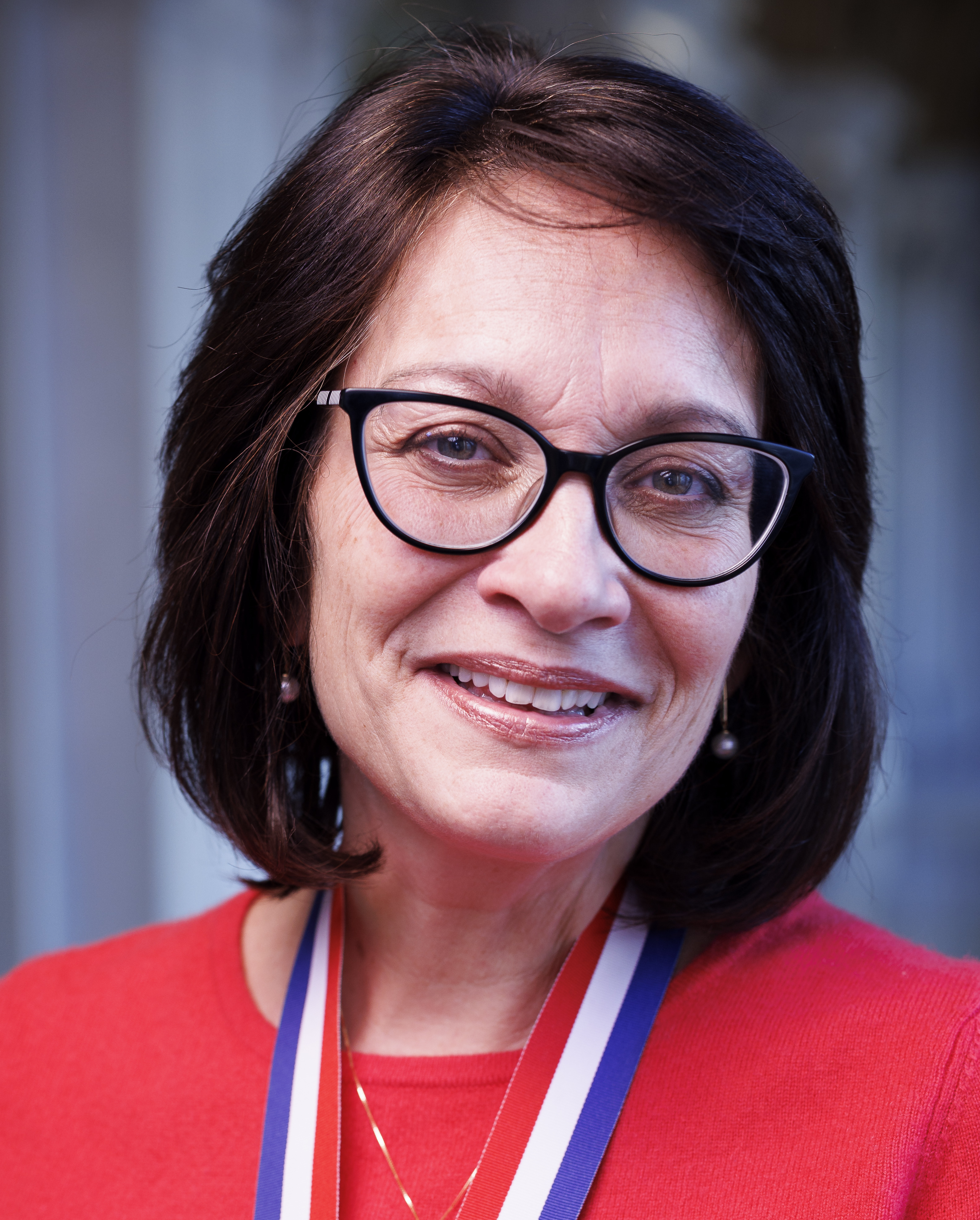
- Medina in 2023
- Born: Margaret Rose Medina; June 11, 1963 (age 63); Alexandria, Virginia, US
- Occupation: Writer
- Known for: Newbery Medalist 2019
- Spouse: Javier Menéndez
- Children: 3

Meg Medina is an American children’s book author of Cuban descent whose books celebrate Latino culture and the lives of young people. She served as the 2023–2024 National Ambassador for Young People’s Literature. Medina is the recipient of the 2019 John Newbery Medal for her middle grade novel, Merci Suárez Changes Gears and the Pura Belpré Award for Yaqui Delgado Wants to Kick Your Ass (2014) and the Pura Belpré Award Honor Book in 2016 for Mango, Abuela and Me).

== Early life and education ==
Medina is the younger of two daughters of Lidia Regla Metauten and Juan Norberto Medina, who emigrated from Cuba in the early 1960s. The couple separated shortly before Medina’s birth, and her mother relocated with her children to Queens, New York, where they were joined over the years with remaining family members from Cuba. Medina often points to her early life experiences as the underpinnings of her works, which examine themes of immigration, family estrangements, separation from loved ones, and financial hardships.

Medina attended P.S. 22 in Flushing, Queens, followed by Junior High School 189. During her high school years, Medina reconnected briefly with her father and attended Seekonk High School in Massachusetts, where her father had settled with his new wife and family.

Medina began her studies at Hunter College of the City University of New York, although she ultimately transferred to Queens College to complete her degree. She married a childhood friend, Javier Menendez, in 1983 and graduated the following year, majoring in Communication Arts and minoring in English Writing.

== Career ==
Medina first worked briefly as an editorial assistant at Simon & Schuster in the Monarch Press division before a ten-year teaching career in the New York City Public Schools and later, after relocating with her family to Florida in 1988, in the School District of Palm Beach County. Medina began writing as a freelance journalist for iCE Magazine, the Sun Sentinel, and South Florida Parenting magazine. The family again relocated in 1998 with their three children to Richmond, Virginia, where Medina turned her attention to writing fiction for young readers.

Medina's debut middle grade novel, Milagros: Girl from Away, was published by Henry Holt Books for Young Readers in 2008. Medina then began a relationship with Candlewick Press. Tia Isa Wants a Car, a picture book based closely on her aunt’s purchase of a family car, received the Ezra Jack Keats Book Award in 2011. Her young adult novel, Yaqui Delgado Wants to Kick Your Ass, following the harrowing experience of Piddy Sanchez in the crosshairs of a school bully, was awarded the Pura Belpré Award for writing in 2014 and the International Latino Book Awards for Best YA Fiction in English in 2014. Her picture book Mango, Abuela, and Me, about a Spanish-speaking grandmother and her English-speaking granddaughter, received the Pura Belpré Award honor in writing and illustration in 2016. Her young adult historical fiction novel Burn Baby Burn, about 17-year-old Nora Lopez surviving the summer of 1977 as a serial killer is stalking young women in her neighborhood, was long-listed for the National Book Award and received the Westchester Fiction Award in 2017. Medina received the Charlotte Huck Award honor and the John D Newbery Medal in 2019 for her middle grade novel, Merci Suárez Changes Gears, which depicts the life of 12-year-old Merci Suárez in her daily struggles with her Cuban-American family as they face the challenge of an Alzheimer’s diagnosis for her beloved grandfather, Lolo.

Medina has advocated for more diversity in children’s literature, supported emerging authors, and worked in literacy initiatives aimed at the Latino community. She was a founding member of We Need Diverse Books, served on their Advisory Committee, and was a faculty member of the Hamline Masters in Fine Arts for Children’s Writing. Medina served as the 2023-2024 National Ambassador for Young People's Literature.

== Awards and recognition ==
- Ezra Jack Keats New Writer Award for Tia Isa Wants a Car (2012)
- Charlotte Zolotow Commended Title for Tia Isa Wants a Car (2012)
- Cybils Award for Yaqui Delgado Wants to Kick Your Ass (2013)
- In the Margins Award for Yaqui Delgado Wants to Kick Your Ass (2014)
- Pura Belpré Award for Yaqui Delgado Wants to Kick Your Ass (2014)
- International Latino Book Award for Burn Baby Burn (2014)
- CNN's "10 Visionary Women" list
- Latino Book Award for Best Young Adult Fiction Book (first place) for Yaqui Delgado Wants to Kick Your Ass (2014)
- Latino Book Award for Best Young Adult Fiction Book (second place) for The Girl Who Could Silence the Wind (2014)
- 2015 Top Ten New Latino Authors by Latino Stories
- Pura Belpré Award Author Honor Book (2016, for Mango, Abuela and Me)
- National Book Award longlist (2016, for Burn Baby Burn)
- 2016 New Atlantic Independent Booksellers Association
- Westchester Library Association Fiction Award (2017, for Burn Baby Burn)
- Southerner of the Year (2017)
- Newbery Medal (2019, for Merci Suárez Changes Gears)
- Charlotte Huck Honor Book for (2019, for Merci Suárez Changes Gears)
- Henrico County, Virginia, Board of Supervisors' commendation of Meg Medina (2019)
- Virginia House of Delegates Joint Resolution 934 commending Meg Medina, agreed to by the House of Delegates, February 18, 2019, and agreed to by the Senate, February 23, 2019
- Senate of Virginia Resolution 130 commending Meg Medina on winning the John Newbery Medal for children’s literature in 2019.
- Appointed National Ambassador for Children's Literature for 2023 - 2024 by the Library of Congress and Every Child a Reader

== Articles ==
- A Deaf Girl Finds Her Voice on Martha’s Vineyard in the 19th Century, 2020, New York Times Book Review
- Dark Magic and Other Escapes in These Summer Y.A. Novels, 2018, New York Times Book Review
- The Writer's Page: On Writing the American Familia, 2015, Horn Book

== Works ==
- Tia Isa Wants a Car (2011)
- Tia Isa quiere un carro (2012)
- The Girl Who Could Silence the Wind (2012)
- Yaqui Delgado Wants to Kick Your Ass (2013)
- Mango, Abuela and Me (2015)
- Mango, Abuela Y Yo (2015)
- Burn Baby Burn (2016)
- Yaqui Delgado quiere darte una paliza (2016)
- Merci Suárez Changes Gears (2018)
- Merci Suárez se pone las pilas (2020)
- Evelyn del Rey is Moving Away (2020)
- Evelyn del Rey se muda (2020)
- She Persisted: Sonia Sotomayor (2021)
- Merci Suárez Can't Dance (2021)
- Merci Suárez Plays It Cool (2022)
- Merci Suárez No Sabe Bailar (2022)
- She Persisted: Pura Belpré (2023) with Marilisa Jiménez García
- No More Señora Mimí (2024)
- No más Señora Mimí (2024)
- Merci Suárez se hace sa lista (2025)

=== Anthologies ===
- Been There, Done That, edited by Mike Winchell, (2016)
- Flying Lessons & Other Stories, edited by Ellen Oh, (2017)
- The Radical Element, edited by Jessica Spotswood, (2018)
- The Talk: Conversations about Race, Love & Truth, edited by Cheryl and Wade Hudson, (2020)
- Wild Tongues Can't Be Tamed, edited by Saraciea Fennell, (2021)
- A Little Bit Super, edited by Leah Henderson and Gary Schmidt, (2024)
