= Jerome Lagarrigue =

French painter (born 1973)

- Born: August 18, 1973 (age 52)
- Occupation: Painter

Jérôme Lagarrigue (born August 18, 1973) is a French painter living in New York City.

== Biography ==
Lagarrigue was born in Paris, to a French father who was an illustrator and painter, and an American mother who was a journalist and writer. As a child, he was schooled in France, but spent summers in New York City, where he now lives. He graduated from the Rhode Island School of Design, with a major in illustration, in 1996.

Two years after graduation, Parsons School of Design made Lagarrigue professor of drawing and painting.

In 2002, Lagarrigue won the John Steptoe Award for New Talent for his illustrations in Freedom Summer.

== Solo exhibitions ==
- 2001 - "Boxers", The Cutting Room Gallery, 19 W 24th St, New York City.
- 2002 - "Recent works", Museum of Tolerance, Los Angeles.
- 2003 - "Paintings", UFA Gallery, 526 W 26th St, New York City.
- 2005 - "Synchresis", TheXpo Gallery, 63 Pearl St, Brooklyn, New York City.
- 2006 - "Paesaggio Del viso", Villa Medicis, Rome, Italy and Oliver Waltman Gallery, Paris.
- 2007 - "Boxing", Galerie Olivier Waltman, 74 Rue Mazarine, Paris.
- 2009 - "Brooklintimate", Galerie Olivier Waltman, 74 Rue Mazarine, Paris.
- 2010 - "Urban Boxing United", Palais de la Bourse, Marseilles, France.
- 2011 - "Anne Claire", BDG Gallery, 535 W 25th St, New York City.
- 2012 - "Closer", Waltman Ortega Gallery, 2233 NW 2nd Avenue, Miami, FL.
- 2014 - "Visible Man", Driscoll Babcock Gallery, 525 W 25th Street, New York City.
- 2017 - "The Tipping Point", Lazarides Gallery, 11 Rathbone Place, London, UK.

== Books illustrated ==
- 1999 - "My Man Blue", text by Nikki Grimes. ISBN 978-0-14-230197-5
- 2002 - "Freedom Summer", text by Deborah Wiles. ISBN 978-0-689-87829-9
- 2003 - "Me and Uncle Romie", text by Claire Hartfield. ISBN 978-0-8037-2520-1
- 2004 - "Going North", text by Janice N. Harrington. ISBN 978-0-374-32681-4
- 2004 - "Freedom on the Menu", text by Carole Weatherford. ISBN 978-0-8037-2860-8
- 2007 - "Poetry for young people", poems by Maya Angelou. ISBN 978-1-4027-2023-9
- 2007 - "Pleine Face", text by Sylvain Coher, publisher: Éponyme. ISBN 2-84809-069-3
