= Each Little Bird That Sings =

2005 novel by Deborah Wiles

- Author: Deborah Wiles
- Language: English
- Publication date: 2005

Each Little Bird That Sings is a 2005 novel aimed for people of all ages, by Deborah Wiles, the author of Love, Ruby Lavender. It won the 2006 Association of Booksellers for Children E. B. White Read Aloud Award for older children, was a finalist at the 2005 United States National Book Awards, and won the California Young Reader Medal in 2008.

Comfort Snowberger's family lives in the fictional Snapfinger, Mississippi, where they own a funeral home. As a result, Comfort has grown up around a funeral culture and has attended 247 funerals. Comfort has a best friend named Declaration, and a cousin named Peach, whom she dislikes.

== Summary ==
This book says that death is a part of life

Comfort Snowberger's Great-great-Aunt Florentine dies in her garden, and her Great-Uncle Edisto dies the day they had planned a picnic. Comfort is very worried about her next funeral, which will be her 248th, and whose it will be. She is also annoyed with the burden of having to care for her cousin, Peach, after the funeral. After a while, this is when Comfort realizes that her true friend had been there all along with Peach. All Comfort wants to do now is hide in her closet with Dismay. However, Comfort, Peach and Dismay are caught in a flash flood at the cemetery, and struggle to stay above water on an oak tree. Comfort tells Peach to let Dismay go, but Peach does not hear her, submerged underwater. Comfort pries Peach's fingers off of Dismay's collar, leaving the dog to float down the stream alone. Dismay's collar is found by Declaration close to a drainage ditch near Lake Tallyhoma. Knowing he is dead, Snapfinger holds a memorial service for Dismay, but Declaration and Comfort remain upset with each other.

== Main characters ==
- Comfort Snowberger
- Merry Snowberger is Comfort's little sister.
- Tidings Snowberger is Comfort's older brother.
- Great Uncle Edisto Snowberger is Comfort, Tidings, and Merry's great uncle.
- Great Great Aunt Florentine is Comfort, Tidings, and Merry's great, great aunt.
- Peach Shuggars is Comfort's eight-year-old cousin.
- Declaration Johnson was Comforts best friend
- Dismay is Comfort's pet dog, a Black Labrador retriever.
