= Deborah Wiles =

Children's book author

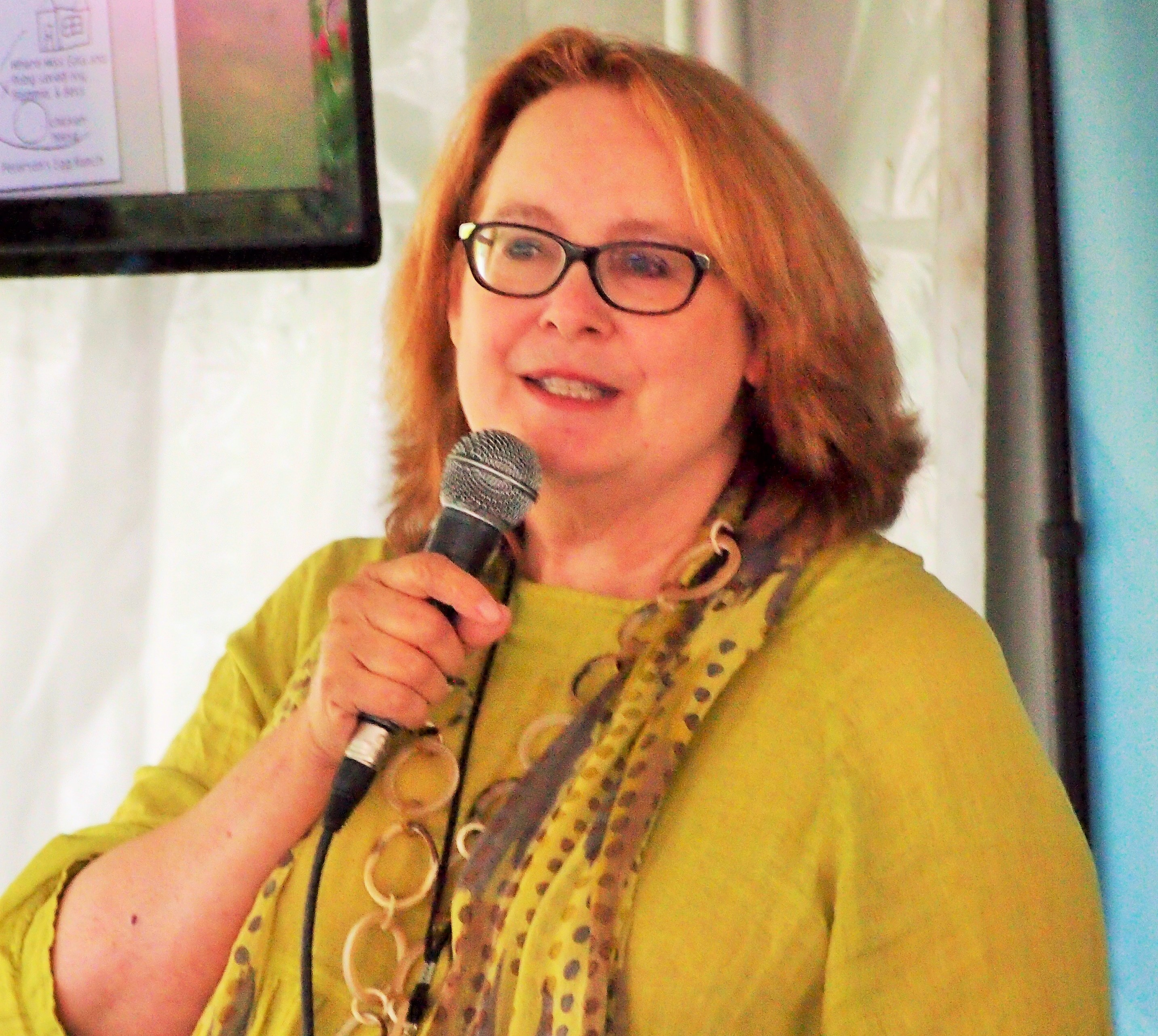
- Born: May 5, 1953 (age 72); Mobile, Alabama, U.S.
- Occupation: Writer

Deborah Wiles (born May 5, 1953, Mobile, Alabama, United States) is a children's book author. Her second novel, Each Little Bird That Sings, was a 2005 National Book Award finalist. Her documentary novel, Revolution, was a 2014 National Book Award finalist. Wiles received the PEN/Phyllis Naylor Working Writer Fellowship in 2004 and the E.B. White Read-Aloud Award in 2005. Her fiction centers on home, family, kinship, and community, and often deals with historical events (Freedom Summer/Civil Rights, the Cuban Missile Crisis, the Vietnam War), social justice issues, and childhood reactions to those events, as well as everyday childhood moments and mysteries, most taken directly from her childhood. She often says, "I take my personal narrative and turn it into story."

== Personal life ==
Deborah Wiles was born in Mobile, Alabama, the daughter of Marie Kilgore and Thomas Edwards, who was an air force pilot. Today she lives in Atlanta, Georgia. She has four children and is married to Jim Pearce, a jazz musician. She received her MFA in writing from Vermont College in 2003.

== Works ==
Wiles published a picture book, Freedom Summer (Simon & Schuster/Atheneum), in 2001. The book is based on her memories of her growing up summers in Mississippi and the 1964 passage of the Civil Rights Act. Two boys, best friends, want to swim at the town pool together the day it opens to "everybody under the sun, no matter what color," but find out that they can't, as the pool has been filled in "with hot, spongy tar." The decision they make after this event is one that cements their friendship. Freedom Summer won the Simon Wiesenthal Once Upon A World Award, the Ezra Jack Keats New Writer award for Wiles and New Illustrator award for Jerome Lagarrigue, as well as the Coretta Scott King/Steptoe award for Lagarrigue.

Another picture book, One Wide Sky, was published in 2003 (Harcourt Brace). It is a rhyming counting book that depicts the joys of the natural world and family. It was a Children's Book of the Month Club selection and has accompanying music written by Jim Pearce.

The Aurora County Trilogy

The Aurora County Trilogy consists of three novels that take place in the fictional Aurora County, Mississippi, which is really Jasper County, Mississippi, and the place that Wiles spent part of her childhood summers. Her father was born and raised in Louin, Mississippi, and her grandmother and great-grandmother lived there most of their lives. Louin becomes the town of Halleluia in Love, Ruby Lavender, the town of Snapfinger in Each Little Bird that Sings, and the towns Mabel and Halleluia in The Aurora County All-Stars.

Love, Ruby Lavender (Harcourt Brace), was published in 2001 and is about a nine-year-old girl, Ruby, who lives in Halleluia, Mississippi. In this book, her grandmother of a best friend takes a vacation to Hawaii, leaving Ruby to put up with Melba Jane, who has not stop bothering her since the accident with Melba's father and Ruby's grandfather last summer. Ruby writes to and receives many letters from her grandmother, chronicling her summer. The novel was an ALA Notable Children's Book, a BookSense 76 Pick, an NCTE Notable Children's Trade Book in the Language Arts, a New York Public Library 100 Titles For Reading and Sharing title, and a Parent's Guide Children's Media Award Winner.

Each Little Bird That Sings (Harcourt Brace) published in 2005, is about Comfort Snowberger who lives in Snapfinger Mississippi. Her family lives above a funeral home that they run, and Comfort writes obituaries for the paper. She knows exactly what flowers to bring, what dish to take, and who not to bring to a visitation and funeral, since she has been to at least 200. Number one on that last list is her sniffling, whiney cousin Peach. When her Great-great-Aunt Florentine dies, straight after her Uncle Edisto, all Comfort wants to do is curl up in her closet and hide with her big dog, Dismay, even if it is the most important funeral of her life so far. Unfortunately, she has to go, and take whiney Peach with her, and on top of that, her best friend Declaration is turning downright mean. Comfort learns that life is full of surprises, and the biggest one is learning how to handle them. As Uncle Edisto tells her, "Open your arms to life! Let it strut into your heart, in all its messy glory!" 'Each Little Bird that Sings' was a National Book Award Finalist.

The Aurora County All-Stars (Harcourt) completes the trilogy of Mississippi novels that includes Each Little Bird That Sings and Love, Ruby Lavender. It is about a young pitcher named House Jackson, whose hero is the Los Angeles Dodgers pitcher Sandy Koufax. House's team, the Aurora County All-Stars, is a small community team that has only one game every year at four-o-clock on July 4, without fail, against the Raleigh Redbugs. Unfortunately for House, his pitching elbow was broken before last year's game, and his team lost. This year though, he is going to give that game all he has. July 4 happens to also be the town's 200th anniversary this year, and the town is holding a pageant, for which all mothers have signed up their children, including the baseball players. The director of the pageant is 14-year-old Frances Shotz, the same girl who broke House's elbow. 'The Aurora County All-Stars' shows what it truly means to be strong, to create community, and to sacrifice for a friend.

A fourth Aurora County book, a companion to the first three, will be published in September 2018, titled A Long Line of Cakes.

The Sixties Trilogy

The Sixties Trilogy is a series of three companion novels about the 1960s for young readers, published by Scholastic Press. The books are a first of their kind: documentary novels. They contain scrapbooks of archival primary-source material as part of the narrative—photographs, song lyrics, advertisements, biographies, quotes, newspaper articles and more. Book one takes place in 1962, book two in 1964, and book three in 1969.

Book one, Countdown (Scholastic Press), was published May 1, 2010. It takes place in October 1962, during the Cuban Missile Crisis and is a story about eleven-year-old Franny Chapman and her great desire to be seen, to belong, and to matter in a world that includes her authoritative mother, her Air Force pilot father, the interesting new boy across the street, a best friend who is turning into an enemy, a perfect little brother who wants to be an astronaut, an amazing older sister with secrets, an uncle who is still living through the trenches in World War I, and the real horror of the Cuban Missile Crisis, for thirteen days in October 1962, when the world came as close as it has ever come to nuclear annihilation.

Countdown was a Publishers Weekly Best Book of the Year, 2010; an Amazon's Best Books of the Year (2010), Top Ten Middle Grade Books; a Booklist Editor’s Choice for 2010; a Book Links Lasting Connection of 2010; a Best Books of 2010, The Christian Science Monitor, and an ALA Notable Book. It received starred reviews from Booklist, Kirkus, School Library Journal, and Publishers Weekly.

Book two, Revolution, was published in May 2014. It tells the sixties story of the civil rights movement through the eyes of 12-year-old Sunny Fairchild, who lives in Greenwood, Mississippi during Freedom Summer in 1964. Jo Ellen Chapman, a character from book one of the sixties trilogy, Countdown, appears in Revolution as a Freedom Worker for SNCC in Greenwood.

Revolution was a 2014 National Book Award Finalist, was a Golden Kite Award winner, a Jane Addams Peace Award honor book, an NAACP Image Award finalist, an Amazon best book of the month, and received reviews in The Washington Post, Publishers Weekly, School Library Journal, Kirkus Reviews, The Horn Book, and Booklist.

Anthem, set in 1969, completed the trilogy.

She wrote Night Walk to the Sea: A Story about Rachel Carson, Earth’s Protector, and Bobby - A Story of Robert F. Kennedy.

== Bibliography ==
=== Novels ===
- Love, Ruby Lavender (2001)
- Each Little Bird That Sings (2005)
- The Aurora County All Stars (2007)
- Countdown (2010)
- Revolution (2014)
- A Long Line of Cakes (2018)
- Anthem (2019)
- Kent State (2020)

=== Picture books ===
- Freedom Summer (2001)
- One Wide Sky (2003)
