= Bird (book) =

2008 picture book by Zetta Elliott

- Author: Zetta Elliott
- Illustrator: Shadra Strickland
- Published: 2008
- Publisher: Lee & Low Books
- Awards: New Voices Award Honor

Bird, written by Zetta Elliott and illustrated by Shadra Strickland, is a picture book written in 2008. It won the New Voices Award Honor from its publishing company Lee & Low Books Incorporation.

== Background & Setting ==
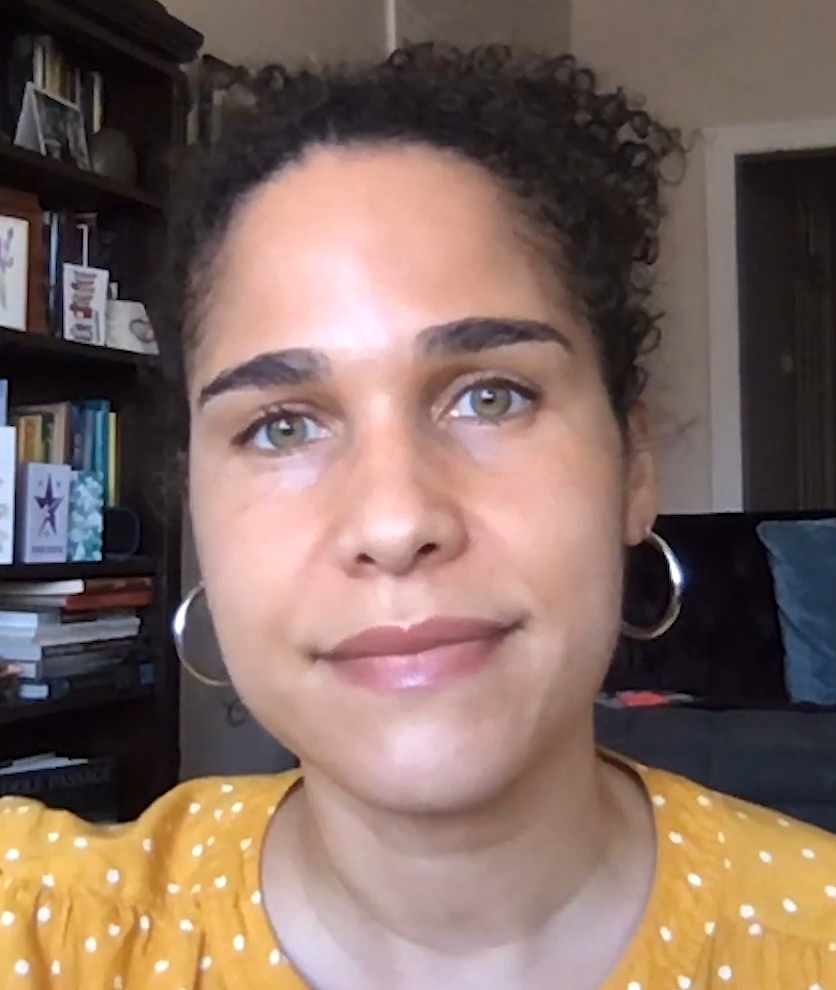
Zetta Elliot

Zetta Elliot is a poet, author, and obtained a doctorate degree in American Studies from NYU. She wrote Bird as a short story in 2006 before working with illustrator Shadra Strickland to turn it into a picture book in 2008. It is her first publication, and has won many awards. Bird is an African American story that contains elements of African folklore and touches on death and mental illness.

== Plot summary ==
The book narrates the story of a young black boy named Mehkai. His nickname is Bird, given to him by his Grandad. However, when his granddad passes away, Mehkai grows close to his grandad's best friend named Uncle Son. Together they go to the park, feed pigeons, tell stories, and drink coffee.Bird loves to draw to remember and better understand things in his life. His favorite thing to draw is, of course, birds. Flashing back in time, Bird describes his brother Marcus who was a graffiti artist that taught him to draw. However, Marcus introduces difficulties to the plot by becoming distant and showing signs of drug abuse. Bird doesn't quite understand what is happening to his brother and wants to spend more time with him, but Marcus is adamant in telling Bird to continue to go to school. One day, Bird finds Marcus in bed showing withdrawal symptoms. He is confused and worried for his brother. Marcus lessens his appearance at the house and one day robs the house of its expensive belongings. His father explains to Bird that Marcus is suffering from a sickness and that he is no longer allowed home. Bird finds it difficult to obey his parents and speaks to Marcus at the front door when their parents aren't home. Turning to Granddad for advice, Bird learns that "'some broken things can't be fixed". When Marcus passes away and Granddad shortly after, Uncle Son and Bird begin to go to the park every week. During these outings, Bird learns to find peace with the loss of his brother and his Grandfather, and he continues to draw in hopes to learn from his experiences and never forget.

== Characters ==
- Mehkai (Bird)- The main character and narrator of the story, also known as Bird by his Grandad.
- Uncle Son- The best friend of Mehkai's Grandad, and a philosophical companion to Mehkai when his Grandad passes away.
- Grandad- Mehkai's Grandfather and a mentor to Mehkai. He passes away at the end of the book.
- Marcus- He is Bird's older brother and someone that Bird looks up to. However, he struggles with a drug addiction that leads to his death at the end of the book.
- Mama- Bird's mother
- Papa- Bird's father.

== Themes ==
Themes included are Diversity & Race due to it being an African American story. Other themes include Empathy & Compassion, Coping with Death and Grief, and Adolescent Issues.

== Reception ==
=== Reviews ===
- The International Journal of Multicultural Education looks at the gender dynamics, language, and audience. While praising the authenticity of the book, Basile reviews the lack of female portrayal in Bird's life, while typically it is the male figure that is absent in African American families. In regard to language, the reviewer writes "Urban African Americans are often seen as using a fair amount of ‘Ebonics’ and family-rich endearments to make their voices known. The author includes very few words of African American dialect and hence makes this a story appear too cleaned up.” While questioning gender and language, the author praises the author's attempt to connect to a wider audience.
- Kirkus Book Reviews praises Bird, "With unusual depth and raw conviction, Elliott’s child-centered narrative excels in this debut."
- "In a promising debut for both Elliott and Strickland, this picture book tells a poignant story about a boy whose loving family, friends and a gift for drawing help him navigate difficult emotions surrounding the deaths of his grandfather and drug-addicted brother. A complicated weaving of impressive watercolor, gouache, charcoal and ink drawings amplifies the metaphors and action of the poetic text as it combines black-and-white with color," states Publishers Weekly.

=== Awards ===
Bird won the Lee & Low New Voices Honor Award, an award given by the publishers of the book. Other major awards include the Coretta Scott King Award/John Steptoe Award for New Talent and the Ezra Jack Keats New Illustrator Award for Shadra Strickland. Additional honors includes the Best of 2008 Kirkus Reviews (& starred review), 2009 ALA Notable Children's Book, Bank Street College Best Children's Book 2009, 2009 Paterson Prize for Book for Young Readers, and 2011 West Virginia Children's Choice Book Award.
