= Yaqui Delgado Wants to Kick Your Ass =

2013 young adult novel by Meg Medina

- First edition
- Author: Meg Medina
- Language: English
- Genre: Young adult fiction
- Published: 2013, Candlewick Press
- Publication place: United States
- Media type: Print, ebook, audiobook
- Pages: 272 pages
- Awards: Cybils Award; Pura Belpré Award
- ISBN: 0763658596
- Preceded by: The Girl Who Could Silence the Wind

Yaqui Delgado Wants to Kick Your Ass is a 2013 young adult novel by Cuban-American author Meg Medina. The book was first published in the United States on 26 March 2013 through Candlewick Press and is the winner of the 2013 Cybils Award and the 2014 Pura Belpré Award. The book has been challenged in some schools due to its title and language, and deals with the theme of teen bullying and its effects on the individual and their lives.

Medina had initially titled the book Finding Yaqui del Gado, but changed the title upon the publisher's request. The book's premise is based on a similar situation Medina experienced in her youth and she expressed interest in readers using the book as a way to start discussing the topic of bullying.

== Synopsis ==
Piedad "Piddy" Sanchez is in trouble. Not only has she had to move from her former home and lose one of her friends because of the move, but today she went to school and was told in no uncertain terms that "Yaqui Delgado wants to kick your ass". Piddy has never interacted with Yaqui at all and she's initially confused, as she had no idea that Yaqui even existed in the first place. She's informed that Yaqui hates everything about Piddy, as she thinks that she's stuck-up, a show off, and is interested in stealing Yaqui's boyfriend. Yaqui also feels that Piddy does not act or talk "Latina enough" for her tastes. This horrifies Piddy, as she'd rather spend her time working at a local hair salon and trying to find out more about her absentee father rather than trying to prevent herself from getting hurt.

Despite Piddy's protestations that she doesn't want to fight Yaqui and is not interested in her boyfriend (of whose identity she is unaware), she soon finds herself getting bullied by Yaqui and her gang. The bullying continues to escalate until Piddy is ultimately afraid to even leave her house, lest Yaqui and her followers discover her. To make matters worse, Piddy's mom refuses to tell Piddy anything about her father because her father was "scum", which sets Piddy and her mother at odds and puts an even larger strain on Piddy's existence. Piddy finds herself falling in love with a person from her childhood, Joey Halper, who gives her an oasis from the bullying. It is to Joey that Piddy finally reveals that Yaqui and her gang have begun beating Piddy and left her body covered in bruises and scabs. She's later horrified when she discovers that Joey has first hand knowledge of abuse, as his father frequently beats his mother- to the point where she has ended up in a hospital. Piddy also eventually opens up to one of the salon workers, Lila, confessing that on one occasion someone videotaped Yaqui beating her. Lila tries to encourage Piddy to fight back, saying that it was the only way that she herself survived similar encounters and that people like Yaqui will only end up in misery if they do not change her ways, and that Piddy will go on to bigger and greater things. The following day Joey tries to convince Piddy to run away with him to Pennsylvania, as he knows that his mother will only keep returning to her abusive husband and he does not want to continue to witness her beatings. Piddy refuses, knowing that running away will only ensure that Yaqui has truly won, as it will have taken her entire family and future away from her.

Ultimately Yaqui's actions are finally reported to the school principal by one of Piddy's peers and Piddy confirms that Yaqui has been bullying her. The two girls are both brought to the office, where Yaqui denies bullying Piddy. The encounter is initially surreal for Piddy, as she had not previously clearly seen Yaqui's face up close. Yaqui keeps trying to deny the bullying until Piddy brings up the video of her and Yaqui. Time passes and Piddy begins to reconnect with her mother and some of her friends, as well as tentatively go about picking up the pieces of her life. She's informed by the principal that while they may be able to expel Yaqui, they cannot expel all of the people in her group and that it might be best if she were to apply for a transfer to another school. This doesn't sit well with Lila, who wants Piddy to remain at the school and fight, but Piddy ultimately decides to apply for the transfer. The book ends with Piddy adjusting to life in her new school, finding that she has been accepted to a prestigious academy, and happily celebrating with her mother and everyone else in the salon.

== Challenged status ==
Yaqui Delgado Wants to Kick Your Ass has been challenged in some schools due to the coarse language in the book and in its title. In 2013 Medina was invited to be a guest speaker at an anti-bullying event at a Cumberland County school in Virginia, but was later told that she could not display the book title, cover, or use any sort of coarse language during her speech. Her invitation was later rescinded after school officials learned via a book trailer that the book contained other objectionable languages. Medina commented on this, stating "There was going to be more to the presentation than just me listing all the dirty words that we use ... Really what the presentation was going to be about was where the story originated in my life, how a sliver of life turned into fiction and really how this fiction helps us examine what we're doing good and bad." The Kids' Right to Read Project heavily criticized the school board's choice to rescind Medina's invitation and restrict discussion to not potentially include coarse language, writing "Censoring frank discussion about the language of bullying and the powerful effect of certain words sends a message to students that these subjects and, by extension, their experiences, are not to be discussed; that though they may face cruel language and abuse in their daily lives, they are not mature enough to participate in a realistic conversation on this subject."

In 2023, the book was banned in Clay County District Schools, Florida.

== Reception ==
Critical reception for Yaqui Delgado Wants to Kick Your Ass has been overwhelmingly positive, and the book has received praise from the Horn Book Magazine and Publishers Weekly. The School Library Journal and Booklist both gave positive reviews for the work, and the School Library Journal commented that the audiobook's narration was especially well done. The Washington Post also had praise for the work, stating "This unflinching novel, with its richly developed main character, deserves a place with two other nuanced bully books for teens" and compared it favorably with other similarly themed works.

=== Awards ===
- 2013 Cybils Award
- 2014 Pura Belpré Award

== Television series ==
In February 2017, it was reported that streaming service Hulu had ordered a television series adaptation of the novel with executive producers including Gina Rodriguez and Eugenio Derbez.

== Graphic novel ==
In 2023, the book was adapted into a graphic novel by Mel Valentine Vargas.
