= Jeri Watts =

American author and professor

Jeri Hanel Watts is an American author and professor, known for her book Kizzy Ann Stamps and A Piece of Home, which won the 2017 Ezra Jack Keats New Writer Award. She currently lives in Virginia, where she is an associate professor at Lynchburg College.

== Bibliography ==
- Keepers (1997, Lee & Low Books)
- Kizzy Ann Stamps (2012, Candlewick Press)
- A Piece of Home (2016, Candlewick Press)
