= Freedom Summer (book) =

2001 children's book by Deborah Wiles

- Author: Deborah Wiles
- Illustrator: Jerome Lagarrigue
- Language: English
- Genre: Children's literature
- Publisher: Simon & Schuster
- Publication date: 2001
- Pages: 32 pages
- ISBN: 978-0-689-87829-9
- OCLC: 57510775

Freedom Summer is a children's picture book written by Deborah Wiles and illustrated by Jerome Lagarrigue. Originally published as a hardcover edition in 2001, the book is now available as a paperback from Simon & Schuster.

== Plot ==
The novel is set in Mississippi during the summer of 1964, a summer of desegregation in the South. The story revolves around two best friends, John Henry, who is black and Joe, who is white. They do everything together, including swimming in a local creek. However, they cannot do the same in the town pool because blacks are not allowed to use the public swimming pool.

Joe is then told that a law has been passed that blacks can do everything that whites can do. He is really excited because this means that he can go to the town pool tomorrow with John Henry. The boys are more excited than ever but when they arrive at the town pool the following day, they are shocked to find that the town pool has been closed. The pool has been filled with black sticky tar as the white people in their community chose to close down the entire pool instead of facing the prospect of sharing it with their black neighbors. While the laws of the nation of changed, it becomes clear to the boys that attitudes and ideas about race will take longer to evolve.

The boys are disappointed but the book ends with a glimmer of hope as the two friends are able to enter a grocery store together that was previously for whites only.

== Awards ==
Illustrator Jerome Lagarrigue won the 2002 John Steptoe Award for New Talent for this book. In 2002, the book won the Ezra Jack Keats Award for best new picture book writer of the year and best new illustrator.

== See also ==
- Freedom School, Yes!
