= Cybils Awards for Nonfiction =

Literary awards for children's nonfiction

The Cybils Awards for Nonfiction are annual literary awards for children's nonfiction. Awards were previously presented for picture books (2006–2012), juvenile (2016), middle grade and young adult (2006–2012), elementary and middle grade (2013–2015), junior high (2017–2019), and young adult (2013–2016). The award is current presented across four categories: elementary (since 2016), middle grade (since 2016), and senior high (since 2017). The award was last presented in 2024, with the organization taking a hiatus in 2025.

== Recipients ==
=== Picture books (2006–2012) ===
Year	Author(s)	Title	Result	Ref.
2006	Dianna Aston, illus. by Sylvia Long	An Egg is Quiet	Winner	
2006	Bob Raczka	3-D ABC: A Sculptural Alphabet	Finalists	
2006	Meghan McCarthy	Aliens Are Coming! The True Account of the 1938 War of the Worlds Radio Broadcast	Finalists	
2006	Lola M. Schaefer, illus. by Cathie Felstead	An Island Grows	Finalists	
2006	Sandra Markle, illus. by Alan Marks	Little Lost Bat	Finalists	
2007	Brian Floca	Lightship	Winner	
2007	Lizann Flatt, illus. by Scot Ritchie	Let's Go!	Finalists	
2007	Steve Jenkins	Living Color	Finalists	
2007	Lita Judge	One Thousand Tracings: Healing the Wounds of World War II	Finalists	
2007	April Pulley Sayre, illus. by Scot Ritchie	Vulture View	Finalists	
2007	David Schwartz and Yael Schy, photos by Dwight Kuhn	Where in the Wild?	Finalists	
2008	Nic Bishop	Frogs	Winner	
2008	Jen Bryant, illus. by Melissa Sweet	A River of Words	Finalists	
2008	Meghan McCarthy	Astronaut Handbook	Finalists	
2008	Dennis Brindell Fradin, illus. by Larry Day	Duel! Burr and Hamilton's Deadly War of Words	Finalists	
2008	Susan Stockdale	Fabulous Fishes	Finalists	
2008	Deborah Kogan Ray	Wanda Gág: The Girl Who Lived to Draw	Finalists	
2008	Jeanette Winter	Wangari's Trees of Peace: A True Story from Africa	Finalists	
2009	Chris Barton, illus. by Tony Persiani	The Day-Glo Brothers	Winner	
2009	Carmen Agra Deedy with Wilson Kimeli Naiyomah, illus. by Thomas Gonzalez	14 Cows for America	Finalist	
2009	Steve Jenkins	Down, Down, Down: A Journey to the Bottom of the Sea:	Finalist	
2009	Maya Ajmera, Cynthia Pon, and Magda Nakassis	Faith	Finalist	
2009	Kristin Earhart (ed.), photos by Teruyuki Komiya	Life-Size Zoo: From Tiny Rodents to Gigantic Elephants, An Actual Size Animal Encyclopedia	Finalist	
2009	Shana Corey, illus. by Edwin Fotheringham	Mermaid Queen: The Spectacular True Story of Annette Kellerman, Who Swam Her Way to Fame, Fortune & Swimsuit History!	Finalist	
2009	Brian Floca	Moonshot: The Flight of Apollo 11	Finalist	
2010	Barbara Kerley, illus. by Edwin Fotheringham	The Extraordinary Life of Mark Twain (According to Susy)	Winner	
2010	Steve Jenkins	Bones: Skeletons and How They Work	Finalist	
2010	Deborah Kogan Ray	Dinosaur Mountain: Digging into the Jurassic Age	Finalist	
2010	Matt Tavares	Henry Aaron's Dream	Finalist	
2010	Meghan McCarthy	Pop!: The Invention of Bubble Gum	Finalist	
2010	Andrea Pinkney, illus. by Brian Pinkney	Sit-In: How Four Friends Stood Up by Sitting Down	Finalist	
2010	Roxane Orgill, illus. by Sean Qualls	Skit-Scat Raggedy Cat: Ella Fitzgerald	Finalist	
2011	Carlyn Beccia	I Feel Better with a Frog in My Throat: History's Strangest Cures	Winner	
2011	George Ella Lyon, illus. by Katherine Tillotson	All the Water in the World	Finalist	
2011	Susan Stockdale	Bring On the Birds	Finalist	
2011	Martin Jenkins, illus. by Vicky White	Can We Save the Tiger?	Finalist	
2011	Kathryn O. Galbraith, illus. by Wendy Anderson Halperin	Planting the Wild Garden	Finalist	
2011	Sandra Markle	The Case of the Vanishing Golden Frogs	Finalist	
2011	Jim Arnosky	Thunder Birds: Nature's Flying Predators	Finalist	
2012	Alicia Potter, illus. by Melissa Sweet	Mrs Harkness and the Panda	Winner	
2012	Melissa Sweet	Balloons over Broadway: The True Story of the Puppeteer of Macy's Parade	Finalist	
2012	Nicola Davies, illus. by Brita Granström	Dolphin Baby!	Finalist	
2012	Janet Halfmann illus. by Betsy Thompson	Eggs 1, 2, 3: Who Will the Babies Be?	Finalist	
2012	Jason Chin	Island: A Story of the Galápagos	Finalist	
2012	Maira Kalman	Looking at Lincoln	Finalist	
2012	Nic Bishop	Snakes	Finalist	

=== Juvenile (2016) ===
Year	Author	Title	Result	Ref.
2016	Melissa Sweet	Some Writer!: The Story of E. B. White	Winner	
2016	Charles Ghigna and Animal Planet	Animal Planet Strange, Unusual, Gross & Cool Animals	Finalists	
2016	Lois Miner Huey	Floodwaters and Flames: The 1913 Disaster in Dayton, Ohio	Finalists	
2016	Rebecca L. Johnson	Masters of Disguise: Amazing Animal Tricksters	Finalists	
2016	Erin Hagar	The Inventors of LEGO Toys	Finalists	
2016	April Pulley Sayre	The Slowest Book Ever	Finalists	
2016	Jane Sutcliffe	Will's Words: How William Shakespeare Changed the Way You Talk	Finalists	

=== Middle grade and young adult (2006–2012) ===
Year	Author	Title	Result	Ref.
2006	Russell Freedman	Freedom Walkers: The Story of the Montgomery Bus Boycott	Winner	
2006	Sid Fleischman	Escape!	Finalists	
2006	Alan Wolf	Immersed in Verse	Finalists	
2006	Kathleen Krull, illustrated by Boris Kulikov	Isaac Newton	Finalists	
2006	Catherine Thimmesh	Team Moon	Finalists	
2007	Ibtisam Barakat	Tasting the Sky: A Palestinian Childhood	Winner	
2007	Kathleen Krull	Marie Curie	Finalists	
2007	Adrian Dingle, illustrated by Simon Basher	The Periodic Table: Elements with Style!	Finalists	
2007	Eve Drobot	Smart-Opedia	Finalists	
2007	Loree Griffin Burns	Tracking Trash	Finalists	
2007	Peter Sis	The Wall: Growing Up Behind the Iron Curtain	Finalists	
2007	Russell Freedman	Who Was First?	Finalists	
2008	Cylin Busby and John Busby	The Year We Disappeared: A Father-Daughter Memoir	Winner	
2008	David Aguilar	11 Planets: A New View of the Solar System	Finalists	
2008	Scott Reynolds Nelson	Ain't Nothing but a Man	Finalists	
2008	Nancy Amanda Redd	Body Drama	Finalists	
2008	Steve Sheinkin	King George: What Was His Problem?	Finalists	
2008	Martin Sandler	Lincoln Through the Lens	Finalists	
2008	Ben Boos	Swords: An Artist's Devotion	Finalists	
2008	Kadir Nelson	We Are the Ship	Finalists	
2009	Pamela S. Turner, illustrated by Andy Comins	The Frog Scientist	Winner	
2009	Phillip Hoose	Claudette Colvin: Twice Toward Justice	Finalist	
2009	Larry Smith	I Can't Keep My Own Secrets	Finalist	
2009	Elizabeth Partridge	Marching for Freedom: Walk Together Children and Don't You Grow Weary	Finalist	
2009	Sally M. Walker	Written in Bone	Finalist	
2010	Suzanne Jurmain	The Secret of the Yellow Death: A True Story of Medical Sleuthing	Winner	
2010	Paul B. Janeczko	The Dark Game: True Spy Stories	Finalist	
2010	Loree Griffin Burns	The Hive Detectives: Chronicle of a Honey Bee Catastrophe	Finalist	
2010	Sy Montgomery	Kakapo Rescue: Saving the World's Strangest Parrot	Finalist	
2010	Anne Mazer and Ellen Potter	Spilling Ink: A Young Writer's Handbook	Finalist	
2010	Haya Leah Molnar	Under a Red Sky: Memoir of a Childhood in Communist Romania	Finalist	
2010	Elaine Marie Alphin	An Unspeakable Crime: The Prosecution and Persecution of Leo Frank	Finalist	
2011	Candace Fleming	Amelia Lost: The Life and Disappearance of Amelia Earhart	Winner	
2011	Georgia Bragg	How They Croaked: The Awful Ends of the Awfully Famous	Finalist	
2011	Stewart Ross, illus. by Stephen Biesty	Into the Unknown: How Great Explorers Found Their Way by Land, Sea, and Air	Finalist	
2011	Carla Killough McClafferty	The Many Faces of George Washington: Remaking a Presidential Icon	Finalist	
2011	Steve Sheinkin	The Notorious Benedict Arnold	Finalist	
2011	Ann Bausum	Unraveling Freedom: The Battle for Democracy on the Home Front During World War I	Finalist	
2012	Steve Sheinkin	Bomb: The Race to Build—and Steal—the World's Most Dangerous Weapon	Winner	
2012	Marsha Skrypuch	Last Airlift: A Vietnamese Orphan's Rescue from War	Finalist	
2012	Phillip Hoose	Moonbird: A Year on the Wind with the Great Survivor B95	Finalist	
2012	Sy Montgomery	Temple Grandin: How the Girl Who Loved Cows Embraced Autism and Changed the World	Finalist	
2012	Deborah Hopkinson	Titanic: Voices from the Disaster	Finalist	

=== Elementary and middle grade (2013–2015) ===
Year	Author	Title	Result	Ref.
2013	Annette LeBlanc Cate	Look Up!: Bird-Watching in Your Own Backyard	Winner	
2013	Vicky Alvear Shecter	Anubis Speaks!	Finalist	
2013	Marissa Moss	Barbed Wire Baseball	Finalist	
2013	Lita Judge	How Big Were Dinosaurs?	Finalist	
2013	Brian Floca	Locomotive	Finalist	
2013	Deborah Heiligman	The Boy Who Loved Math	Finalist	
2013	Elizabeth Rusch, illustrated by Susan Swan	Volcano Rising	Finalist	
2014	Melissa Stewart	Feathers: Not Just for Flying	Winner	
2014	Russell Freedman	Angel Island: Gateway to Gold Mountain	Finalist	
2014	Sy Montgomery	Chasing Cheetahs: The Race to Save Africa's Fastest Cat	Finalist	
2014	Loree Griffin Burns	Handle with Care: An Unusual Butterfly Journey	Finalist	
2014	Duncan Tonatiuh	Separate Is Never Equal: Sylvia Mendez and Her Family's Fight for Desegregation	Finalist	
2014	Sandra Markle	The Case of the Vanishing Little Brown Bats	Finalist	
2014	Rebecca L. Johnson	When Lunch Fights Back	Finalist	
2015	Bridget Heos, illustrated by Jennifer Plecas	I, Fly: The Buzz About Flies and How Awesome They Are	Winner	
2015	Laurie Ann Thompson	Emmanuel's Dream: The True Story of Emmanuel Ofosu Yeboah	Finalist	
2015	Gail Jarrow	Fatal Fever: Tracking Down Typhoid Mary	Finalist	
2015	Ben Thompson	Guts & Glory: The Vikings	Finalist	
2015	David Stabler	Kid presidents: True Tales of Childhood from America's presidents	Finalist	
2015	Miranda Paul	One Plastic Bag: Isatou Ceesay and the Recycling Women of the Gambia	Finalist	
2015	Anita Silvey	Untamed: The Wild Life of Jane Goodall	Finalist	

=== Elementary (2016–) ===
Year	Author	Title	Result	Ref.
2016	Candace Fleming	Giant Squid	Winner	
2016	Lindsay Mattick, illus. by Sophie Blackall	Finding Winnie: The True Story of the World's Most Famous Bear	Finalist	
2016	Jess Keating	Pink Is for Blobfish: Discovering the World's Perfectly Pink Animals	Finalist	
2016	Rebecca E. Hirsch, illus. by Mia Posada	Plants Can't Sit Still	Finalist	
2016	Donna Janell Bowman, illus. by Daniel Minter	Step Right Up: How Doc and Jim Key Taught the World About Kindness	Finalist	
2016	Susan E. Goodman, illus. by E. B. Lewis	The First Step: How One Girl Put Segregation on Trial	Finalist	
2016	Cathleen Burnham	Tortuga Squad: Kids Saving Sea Turtles in Costa Rica	Finalist	
2017	Caroline Arnold	Hatching Chicks in Room 6	Winner	
2017	Marsha Forchuk Skrypuch with Tuan Ho, illustrated by Brian Deines	Adrift at Sea: A Vietnamese Boy's Story of Survival	Finalist	
2017	Duncan Tonatiuh	Danza!: Amalia Hernández and Mexico's Folkloric Ballet	Finalist	
2017	Chris Barton, illus. by Victo Ngai	Dazzle Ships: World War I and the Art of Confusion	Finalist	
2017	Laura Knowles	Once Upon a Jungle	Finalist	
2017	Jess Keating, illus. by Marta Álvarez Miguéns	Shark Lady: The True Story of How Eugenie Clark Became the Ocean's Most Fearless Scientist	Finalist	
2017	Jess Keating	What Makes a Monster?: Discovering the World's Scariest Creatures	Finalist	
2018	Patricia Valdez, illus. by Felicita Sala	Joan Procter, Dragon Doctor	Winner	
2018	Irene Kelly	A Frog's Life	Finalist	
2018	Joseph Bruchac, illus. by Liz Amini-Holmes	Chester Nez and the Unbreakable Code: A Navajo Code Talker's Story	Finalist	
2018	Michelle Cusolito, illus. by Nicole Wong	Flying Deep: Climb Inside Deep-Sea Submersible Alvin	Finalist	
2018	Thane Maynard	Saving Fiona: The Story of the World's Most Famous Baby Hippo	Finalist	
2018	Anne Renaud, illus. by Marie Lafrance	The True Tale of a Giantess: The Story of Anna Swan	Finalist	
2018	Chris Barton, illus. by Ekua Holmes	What Do You Do with a Voice Like That?: The Story of Extraordinary Congresswoman Barbara Jordan	Finalist	
2019	Miranda Paul, illus. by Jason Chin	Nine Months: Before a Baby Is Born	Winner	
2019	Linda Booth Sweeney, illus. by Shawn Fields	Monument Maker: Daniel Chester French and the Lincoln Memorial	Finalist	
2019	Isabel Thomas, illus. by Daniel Egnéus	Moth	Finalist	
2019	Lindsay Moore	Sea Bear: A Journey for Survival	Finalist	
2019	Melissa Stewart, illus. by Sarah S. Brannen	Seashells: More Than a Home	Finalist	
2019	Barry Wittenstein, illus. by Keith Mallett	Sonny's Bridge: Jazz Legend Sonny Rollins Finds His Groove	Finalist	
2019	Susan Hood and Patthana Sornhiran, illus. by Dow Phumiruk	Titan and the Wild Boars: The True Cave Rescue of the Thai Soccer Team	Finalist	
2020	Kate Messner and Adam Rex	The Next President: The Unexpected Beginnings and Unwritten Future of America’s presidents	Winner	
2020	Linda Skeers, illus. by Marta Álvarez Miguéns	Dinosaur Lady: The Daring Discoveries of Mary Anning, the First Paleontologist	Finalist	
2020	Candace Fleming, illus. by Eric Rohmann	Honeybee: The Busy Life of Apis Mellifera	Finalist	
2020	Lindsay H. Metcalf, Keila V. Dawson, and Jeanette Bradley (eds.), illus. by Jeanette Bradley	No Voice Too Small: Fourteen Young Americans Making History	Finalist	
2020	Rob Sanders, illus. by Nabi H. Ali	The Fighting Infantryman	Finalist	
2020	Janet Halfmann, illus. by Duane Smith	The Story of Civil War Hero Robert Smalls	Finalist	
2020	Meeg Pincus, illus. by Yas Imamura	Winged Wonders: Solving the Monarch Migration Mystery	Finalist	
2021	Megan Hoyt, illus. by Iacopo Bruno	Bartali's Bicycle: The True Story of Gino Bartali, Italy's Secret Hero	Winner	
2021	Laurie Wallmark, illus. by Brooke Smart	Code Breaker, Spy Hunter: How Elizebeth Friedman Changed the Course of Two World Wars	Finalist	
2021	Kristen Nordstrom, illus. by Paul Boston	Mimic Makers: Biomimicry Inventors Inspired by Nature	Finalist	
2021	Julie Abery, illus. by Chris Sasaki	Sakamoto's Swim Club: How a Teacher Led an Unlikely Team to Victory	Finalist	
2021	Kim Tomsic, illus. by Hadley Hooper	The Elephants Come Home: A True Story of Seven Elephants, Two People, and One Extraordinary Friendship	Finalist	
2021	Heather Lang, illus. by Jana Christy	The Leaf Detective: How Margaret Lowman Uncovered Secrets in the Rainforest	Finalist	
2021	Traci Sorell, illus. by Frané Lessac	We Are Still Here!: Native American Truths Everyone Should Know	Finalist	
2022	Matt Lilley, illus. by Dan Tavis	Good Eating: The Short Life of Krill	Winner	
2022	Mara Rockliff, illustrated by Juana Martinez-Neal	A Perfect Fit: How Lena “Lane” Bryant Changed the Shape of Fashion	Finalist	
2022	Nana Ekua Brew-Hammond, illustrated by Daniel Minter	Blue: A History of the Color as Deep as the Sea and as Wide as the Sky	Finalist	
2022	Miranda Smith, illustrated by Aaron Cushley	If the World Were 100 Animals: A Visual Guide to Earth's Amazing Creatures	Finalist	
2022	Shannon Stocker, illustrated by Devon Holzwarth	Listen: How Evelyn Glennie, a Deaf Girl, Changed Percussion	Finalist	
2022	Jeff Mack	Marcel's Masterpiece: How a Toilet Shaped the History of Art	Finalist	
2022	Emma Bland Smith, illustrated by Jenn Ely	The Gardener of Alcatraz: A True Story	Finalist	
2023	Jessica Lanan	Jumper: A Day in the Life of a Backyard Jumping Spider	Winner	
2023	Chris Barton, illustrated by Chaaya Prabhat	Glitter Everywhere!: Where it Came From, Where It's Found & Where It's Going	Finalist	
2023	Glenda Armand and Kim Freeman, illustrated by Keith Mallett	Ice Cream Man: How Augustus Jackson Made a Sweet Treat Better	Finalist	
2023	Kate Peridot, illustrated by Becca Hall	Meet The Bears	Finalist	
2023	Lupe Ruiz-Flores, illustrated by Anna López Real	Piece by Piece: Ernestine's Gift for President Roosevelt	Finalist	
2023	Marni Fogelson, illustrated by Marta Álvarez Miguéns	The Girl Who Heard the Music: How One Pianist and 85,000 Bottles and Cans Brought New Hope to an Island	Finalist	
2023	Rachel Ignotofsky	What's Inside a Caterpillar Cocoon?: And Other Questions About Moths & Butterflies	Finalist	
2024	G. Neri, illustrated by Corban Wilkin	My Antarctica: True Adventures in the Land of Mummified Seals, Space Robots, and So Much More	Winner	
2024	Erin Frankel, illustrated by Paola Escobar	A Plate of Hope: The Inspiring Story of Chef José Andrés and World Central Kitchen	Finalist	
2024	Jin Wang and Tony Johnston, illustrated by Anisi Baigude	Born Naughty	Finalist	
2024	Jody Jensen Shaffer, illustrated by Christopher Silas Neal	Creep, Leap, Crunch! A Food Chain Story	Finalist	
2024	Belen Medina, illustrated by Natalia Rojas Castro	Daughter of the Light-Footed People: The Story of Indigenous Marathon Champion Lorena Ramírez	Finalist	
2024	George Takei, illustrated by Michelle Lee	My Lost Freedom: A Japanese American World War II Story	Finalist	
2024	Kristen Tracy, Illustrated by Luisa Uribe	When Beavers Flew	Finalist	

=== Middle grade (2016–) ===
Year	Author	Title	Result	Ref.
2016	Caren Stelson	Sachiko: A Nagasaki Bomb Survivor's Story	Winner	
2016	Michael J. Tougias	A Storm Too Soon: A Remarkable True Survival Story in 80 Foot Seas	Finalist	
2016	Gail Jarrow	Bubonic Panic: When Plague Invaded America	Finalist	
2016	Carlyn Cerniglia Beccia	Fashion Rebels: Style Icons Who Changed the World through Fashion	Finalist	
2016	Deborah Noyes	Ten Days a Madwoman: The Daring Life and Turbulent Times of the Original "Girl" Reporter, Nellie Bly	Finalist	
2016	Linda Barret Osborne	This Land Is Our Land: A History of American Immigration	Finalist	
2016	Russell Freedman	We Will Not Be Silent: The White Rose Student Resistance Movement That Defied Adolf Hitler	Finalist	
2017	Ammi-Joan Paquette	Two Truths and a Lie: It's Alive!	Winner	
2017	Deborah Lee Rose	Beauty and the Beak: How Science, Technology, and a 3D-Printed Beak Rescued a Bald Eagle	Finalist	
2017	Laura Atkins and Stan Yogi, illus. by Yutaka Houlette	Fred Korematsu Speaks Up	Finalist	
2017	Tod Olson	The Incredible Journey of Apollo 13	Finalist	
2017	Tonya Bolden	Pathfinders: The Journeys of 16 Extraordinary Black Souls	Finalist	
2017	S. D. Nelson	Red Cloud	Finalist	
2017	Patricia Newman	Zoo Scientists to the Rescue	Finalist	
2018	Kelly Milner Halls	Death Eaters: Meet Nature's Scavengers	Winner	
2018	Sarah Albee	Dog Days of History: The Incredible Story of Our Best Friends	Finalist	
2018	Kathleen Krull	Frenemies in the Family: Famous Brothers and Sisters Who Butted Heads and Had Each Other's Backs	Finalist	
2018	Susan Goldman Rubin	Maya Lin: Thinking with Her Hands	Finalist	
2018	Sy Montgomery	The Hyena Scientist	Finalist	
2018	Brian Skerry	The Ultimate Book of Sharks	Finalist	
2018	Ammi-Joan Paquette	Two Truths and a Lie: Histories and Mysterie	Finalist	
2019	Trevor Noah	Born a Crime: Stories from a South African Childhood (Adapted)	Winner	
2019	Peter Wohlleben	Can You Hear the Trees Talking?: Discovering the Hidden Life of the Forest	Finalist	
2019	Rex Ogle	Free Lunch	Finalist	
2019	Alison Matthews David	Killer Style: How Fashion Has Injured, Maimed, and Murdered Through History	Finalist	
2019	Rachel Poliquin	Moles	Finalist	
2019	Katherine Johnson	Reaching for the Moon: The Autobiography of NASA Mathematician Katherine Johnson	Finalist	
2019	Jo Ann Allen Boyce	This Promise of Change: One Girl's Story in the Fight for School Equality	Finalist	
2020	Christina Soontornvat	All Thirteen: The Incredible Cave Rescue of the Thai Boys’ Soccer Team	Winner	
2020	John Rocco	How We Got to the Moon: The People, Technology, and Daring Feats of Science Behind Humanity's Greatest Adventure	Finalist	
2020	Magdalena Newman and Nathaniel Newman, illus. by Neil Swaab	Normal: One Kid's Extraordinary Journey	Finalist	
2020	Ana Pego and Minhós Martins, illus. by Bernado P. Carvalho	Plasticus Maritimus: An Invasive Species	Finalist	
2020	Meg Marquardt	STEM in the Final Four	Finalist	
2020	Wade Hudson and Cheryl Willis Hudson (eds.)	The Talk: Conversations about Race, Love & Truth	Finalist	
2020	Tanya Lloyd Kyi, illus. by Drew Shannon	This Is Your Brain on Stereotypes: How Science Is Tackling Unconscious Bias	Finalist	
2021	Rochelle Melander, illus. by Melina Ontiveros	Mightier Than the Sword: Rebels, Reformers, and Revolutionaries Who Changed the World Through Writing	Winner	
2021	Traci Sorell, illus. by Natasha Donovan	Classified: The Secret Career of Mary Golda Ross, Cherokee Aerospace Engineer	Finalist	
2021	Candace Fleming	The Curse of the Mummy: Uncovering Tutankhamun's Tomb	Finalist	
2021	Eugene Yelchin	The Genius Under the Table: Growing Up Behind the Iron Curtain	Finalist	
2021	Philip Bunting	The World's Most Pointless Animals: Or are they?	Finalist	
2021	Carole Boston Weatherford, illus. by Floyd Cooper	Unspeakable: The Tulsa Race Massacre	Finalist	
2021	Yumi Stynes and Dr. Melissa Kang, illus. by Jenny Latham	Welcome to Your Period!	Finalist	
2022	Angela Joy, illus. by Janelle Washington	Choosing Brave: How Mamie Till-Mobley and Emmett Till Sparked the Civil Rights Movement	Winner	
2022	Caroline Stevan, illustrated by Elina Braslina	Citizen She! A Global Campaign for Women's Voting Rights	Finalist	
2022	Candace Fleming	Crash from Outer Space: Unraveling the Mystery of Flying Saucers, Alien Beings, and Roswell	Finalist	
2022	Cheryl Blackford	Fossil Hunter: How Mary Anning Changed the Science of Prehistoric Life	Finalist	
2022	Rachel Poliquin, illustrated by Clayton Hanmer	The Museum of Odd Body Leftovers: A Tour of Your Useless Parts, Flaws, and Other Weird Bits	Finalist	
2023	Nicholas Day, illustrated by Brett Helquist	The Mona Lisa Vanishes: A Legendary Painter, a Shocking Heist, and the Birth of a Global Celebrity	Winner	
2023	Stephanie Warren Drimmer and WonderLab Group	How It Happened! Sneakers: The Cool Stories and Facts Behind Every Pair	Finalist	
2023	Lindsey Fitzharris and Adrian Teal, illustrated by Adrian Teal	Plague-Busters!: Medicine's Battles with History's Deadliest Diseases	Finalist	
2023	Elizabeth Partridge, illustrated by Lauren Tamaki	Seen and Unseen: What Dorothea Lange, Toyo Miyatake, and Ansel Adams's Photographs Reveal About the Japanese American Incarceration	Finalist	
2023	Caren Stelson, illustrated by Selina Alko	Stars of the Night: The Courageous Children of the Czech Kindertransport	Finalist	
2024	Rowena Rae and Paige Stampatori	Why We Need Vaccines: How Humans Beat Infectious Diseases	Winner	
2024	Zora Neale Hurston and Ibram X. Kendi, illustrated by Jazzmen Lee-Johnson	Barracoon: Adapted for Young Readers	Finalist	
2024	Kate Peridot, illustrated by Becca Hall	Meet the Cats	Finalist	
2024	Insha Fitzpatrick	Sightseeing with Aliens: A Totally Factual Field Guide to the Supernatural	Finalist	
2024	Ann Bausum, illustrated by Marta Sevilla	The Bard and the Book: How the First Folio Saved the Plays of William Shakespeare from Oblivion	Finalist	
2024	Joshua M. Greene	The Girl Who Fought Back: Vladka Meed and the Warsaw Ghetto Uprising	Finalist	
2024	Giselle Clarkson	The Observologist: A Handbook for Mounting Very Small Scientific Expeditions	Finalist	

=== Junior high (2017–2019) ===
Year	Author	Title	Result	Ref.
2017	Martin W. Sandler	The Whydah: A Pirate Ship Feared, Wrecked, and Found	Winner	
2017	Sandra Neil Wallace	Bound by Ice: A True North Pole Survival Story	Finalist	
2017	Mary Losure	Isaac the Alchemist: Secrets of Isaac Newton, Reveal'd	Finalist	
2017	Heather E. Schwartz	Locked Up for Freedom: Civil Rights Protesters at the Leesburg Stockade	Finalist	
2017	Sue Macy	Motor Girls: How Women Took the Wheel and Drove Boldly Into the Twentieth Century	Finalist	
2017	Sarah Albee	Poison: Deadly Deeds, Perilous Professions, and Murderous Medicines	Finalist	
2017	Steve Sheinkin	Undefeated: Jim Thorpe and the Carlisle Indian School Football Team	Finalist	
2018	Elizabeth Partridge	Boots on the Ground: America's War in Vietnam	Winner	
2018	Martin W. Sandler	Apollo 8: The Mission That Changed Everything	Finalist	
2018	Patricia Sutton	Capsized!: The Forgotten Story of the SS Eastland Disaster	Finalist	
2018	James L. Swanson	Chasing King's Killer: The Hunt for Martin Luther King, Jr.'s Assassin	Finalist	
2018	Tonya Bolden	Facing Frederick: The Life of Frederick Douglass, a Monumental American Man	Finalist	
2018	Gail Jarrow	Spooked!: How a Radio Broadcast and The War of the Worlds Sparked the 1938 Invasion of America	Finalist	
2018	Sam Kean	The Disappearing Spoon: And Other True Tales of Rivalry, Adventure, and the History of the World from the Periodic Table of the Elements	Finalist	
2019	Ian Lendler	The First Dinosaur: How Science Solved the Greatest Mystery on Earth	Winner	
2019	Martin W. Sandler	1919 The Year That Changed America	Finalist	
2019	Jeffrey Kluger	Disaster Strikes!: The Most Dangerous Space Missions of All Time	Finalist	
2019	Kerrie Logan Hollihan	Mummies Exposed!: Creepy and True #1	Finalist	
2019	Gayle E. Pitman	Stonewall Riots: Coming Out in the Streets	Finalist	
2019	Gail Jarrow	The Poison Eaters: Fighting Danger and Fraud in our Food and Drugs	Finalist	

=== Young adult (2013–2016) ===
Year	Author	Title	Result	Ref.
2013	Martin W. Sandler	Imprisoned: The Betrayal of Japanese Americans during World War II	Winner	
2013	Vicky Alvear Shecter	Breakfast on Mars and 37 Other Delectable Essays	Finalist	
2013	Leon Leyson	The Boy on the Wooden Box: How the Impossible Became Possible . . . on Schindler's List	Finalist	
2013	Catherine Reef	The Bronte Sisters: The Brief Lives of Charlotte, Emily, and Anne	Finalist	
2013	James L. Swanson	"The President Has Been Shot!": The Assassination of John F. Kennedy	Finalist	
2014	Candace Fleming	The Family Romanov: Murder, Rebellion, and the Fall of Imperial Russia	Winner	
2014	Alexis Coe	Alice + Freda Forever: A Murder in Memphis	Finalist	
2014	Laurie Ann Thompson	Be a Changemaker: How to Start Something That Matters	Finalist	
2014	Kuklin	Beyond Magenta: Transgender Teens Speak Out	Finalist	
2014	Maya Van Wagenen	Popular: Vintage Wisdom for a Modern Geek	Finalist	
2014	Don Mitchell	The Freedom Summer Murders	Finalist	
2014	Steve Sheinkin	The Port Chicago 50: Disaster, Mutiny, and the Fight for Civil Rights	Finalist	
2015	Steve Sheinkin	Most Dangerous: Daniel Ellsberg and the Secret History of the Vietnam War	Winner	
2015	Jacqueline Houtman, Walter Naegle, and Michael G. Long	Bayard Rustin: The Invisible Activist	Finalist	
2015	Deborah Hopkinson	Courage & Defiance: Stories of Spies, Saboteurs, and Survivors in World War II Denmark	Finalist	
2015	Kathy Lowinger	Give Me Wings: How a Choir of Former Slaves Took on the World	Finalist	
2015	Martin Ganda	I Will Always Write Back: How One Letter Changed Two Lives	Finalist	
2015	M. T. Anderson	Symphony for the City of the Dead: Dmitri Shostakovich and the Siege of Leningrad	Finalist	
2015	Karen Blumenthal	Tommy: The Gun That Changed America	Finalist	
2016	Sungju Lee	Every Falling Star: The True Story of How I Survived and Escaped North Korea	Winner	
2016	Rich Wallace	Blood Brother: Jonathan Daniels and His Sacrifice for Civil Rights	Finalist	
2016	Bridget Heos	Blood, Bullets, and Bones: The Story of Forensic Science from Sherlock Holmes to DNA	Finalist	
2016	Kenneth C. Davis	In the Shadow of Liberty: The Hidden History of Slavery, Four presidents, and Five Black Lives	Finalist	
2016	Winifred Conkling	Radioactive!: How Irène Curie and Lise Meitner Revolutionized Science and Changed the World	Finalist	
2016	Sarah Miller	The Borden Murders: Lizzie Borden and the Trial of the Century	Finalist	
2016	Patricia McCormick	The Plot to Kill Hitler: Dietrich Bonhoeffer: Pastor, Spy, Unlikely Hero	Finalist	

=== Senior high (2017–) ===
Year	Author(s)	Title	Result	Ref.
2017	Deborah Heiligman	Vincent and Theo: The Van Gogh Brothers	Winner	
2017	Deborah Kops	Alice Paul and the Fight for Women's Rights: From the Vote to the Equal Rights Amendment	Finalists	
2017	Sandra Uwiringiyimana	How Dare the Sun Rise: Memoirs of a War Child	Finalists	
2017	Sarah Prager	Queer, There, and Everywhere: 23 People Who Changed the World	Finalists	
2017	Ann Bausum	The March Against Fear: The Last Great Walk of the Civil Rights Movement and the Emergence of Black Power	Finalists	
2017	Albert Marrin	Uprooted: The Japanese American Experience During World War II	Finalists	
2017	Kay Frydenborg	A Dog in the Cave: The Wolves Who Made Us Human	Finalists	
2018	John Hendrix	The Faithful Spy: Dietrich Bonhoeffer and the Plot to Kill Hitler	Winner	
2018	Karen Blumenthal	Bonnie and Clyde: The Making of a Legend	Finalist	
2018	Bryan Stevenson	Just Mercy (Adapted for Young Adults)	Finalist	
2018	Neal Bascomb	The Grand Escape: The Greatest Prison Breakout of the 20th Century	Finalist	
2018	Winifred Conkling	Votes for Women!: American Suffragists and the Battle for the Ballot	Finalist	
2018	Carol Anderson	We Are Not Yet Equal: Understanding Our Racial Divide	Finalist	
2018	Parkland Student Journalists	We Say #NeverAgain: Reporting by the Parkland Student Journalists	Finalist	
2019	James Rhodes, illus. by Martin O’Neill	Playlist: The Rebels and Revolutionaries of Sound	Winner	
2019	Elizabeth Wein	A Thousand Sisters: The Heroic Airwomen of the Soviet Union in World War II	Finalist	
2019	Sam Quinones	Dreamland: The True Tale of America's Opiate Epidemic (YA edition)	Finalist	
2019	Carol Anderson	One Person, No Vote: How Not All Voters Are Treated Equally (YA edition)	Finalist	
2019	Deborah Heiligman	Torpedoed: The True Story of the World War II Sinking of "The Children's Ship"	Finalist	
2020	Jason Reynolds and Ibram X. Kendi	Stamped: Racism, Antiracism, and You	Winner	
2020	George M. Johnson	All Boys Aren't Blue: A Memoir-Manifesto	Finalist	
2020	Karen Blumenthal	Jane Against the World: Roe v. Wade and the Fight for Reproductive Rights	Finalist	
2020	Amra Sabic-El-Rayess, illus. by Laura L. Sullivan	The Cat I Never Named: A True Story of Love, War, and Survival	Finalist	
2020	Kate Moore	The Radium Girls: Young Readers' Edition	Finalist	
2020	Robyn Ryle	Throw Like a Girl, Cheer Like a Boy: The Evolution of Gender, Identity, and Race in Sports	Finalist	
2020	Ger Duany and Garen Thomas	Walk Toward the Rising Sun: From Child Soldier to Ambassador of Peace	Finalist	
2021	Rex Ogle	Punching Bag	Winner	
2021	Anton Treuer	Everything You Wanted to Know About Indians But Were Afraid to Ask: Young Readers Edition	Finalist	
2021	Amy Cherrix	In the Shadow of the Moon: America, Russia, and the Hidden History of the Space Race	Finalist	
2021	Christian Allaire	The Power of Style	Finalist	
2021	Jeanne Theoharis, adapted by Brandy Colbert and Jeanne Theoharis	The Rebellious Life of Mrs. Rosa Parks: Adapted for Young People	Finalist	
2022	Amy Butler Greenfield	The Woman All Spies Fear: Code Breaker Elizebeth Smith Friedman and Her Hidden Life	Winner	
2022	Gail Jarrow	American Murderer: The Parasite that Haunted the South	Finalist	
2022	Alice Wong (ed.)	Disability Visibility (Adapted for Young Adults): 17 First-Person Stories for Today	Finalist	
2022	Martin W. Sandler	Picturing a Nation: The Great Depression’s Finest Photographers Introduce America to Itself	Finalist	
2022	Kekla Magoon	Revolution in Our Time: The Black Panther Party’s Promise to the People	Finalist	
2023	Steve Sheinkin	Impossible Escape: A True Story of Survival and Heroism in Nazi Europe	Winner	
2023	Robin Wall Kimmerer and Monique Gray Smith, illustrated by Nicole Neidhardt	Braiding Sweetgrass for Young Adults: Indigenous Wisdom, Scientific Knowledge, and the Teachings of Plants	Finalist	
2023	Muzoon Almellehan and Wendy Pearlman	Muzoon: A Syrian Refugee Speaks Out	Finalist	
2023	Monica Edinger and Lesley Younge	Nearer My Freedom: The Interesting Life of Olaudah Equiano by Himself	Finalist	
2023	Joshua Davis	Spare Parts (Young Readers' Edition): The True Story of Four Undocumented Teenagers, One Ugly Robot, and an Impossible Dream	Finalist	
2024	Sherri L. Smith and Elizabeth Wein	American Wings: Chicago's Pioneering Black Aviators and the Race for Equality in the Sky	Winner	
2024	Elizabeth Rusch	A Greater Goal: The Epic Battle for Equal Pay in Women's Soccer-and Beyond	Finalist	
2024	George M. Johnson, illustrated by Charly Palmer	Flamboyants: The Queer Harlem Renaissance I Wish I'd Known	Finalist	
2024	John Florio and Ouisie Shapiro	Marked Man: Frank Serpico’s Inside Battle Against Police Corruption	Finalist	
2024	Michael Eric Dyson and Marc Favreau	Represent: The Unfinished Fight for the Vote	Finalist	
2024	Andrea Warner, illustrated by Louise Reimer	Rise Up and Sing!: Power, Protest, and Activism in Music	Finalist	
2024	Rex Ogle	Road Home	Finalist	

== See also ==
- Cybils Awards for Graphic Novel
- Cybils Awards for Fiction
- Cybils Awards for Speculative Fiction
