= YALSA Award for Excellence in Nonfiction =

Annual literary award for non-fiction books for young adults

The YALSA Award for Excellence in Nonfiction, established in 2010, is an annual literary award presented by the Young Adult Library Services Association of the American Library Association that "honors the best nonfiction book published for young adults (ages 12-18)". It was first given in 2010. The award is announced at ALA's Midwinter Meeting.

The judges select nonfiction titles published for young adults that were published the previous year between November 1 and October 31. All print forms that are marked as intended for young adults are eligible for consideration, including graphic formats. To be eligible, "the title must include excellent writing, research, presentation and readability for young adults." The Excellence in Nonfiction for Young Adults award is one of few that recognizes nonfiction for young adults.

== Recipients ==
=== Winners and finalists ===
Award for Excellence in Nonfiction winners and finalists
Year	Author	Title	Result	Ref.
2010	Deborah Heiligman	Charles and Emma: The Darwins' Leap of Faith	Winner	
2010	Tanya Lee Stone	Almost Astronauts: 13 Women Who Dared to Dream	Finalist	
2010	Phillip Hoose	Claudette Colvin: Twice Toward Justice	Finalist	
2010	Candace Fleming	The Great and Only Barnum: The Tremendous, Stupendous Life of Showman P. T. Barnum	Finalist	
2010	Sally M. Walker	Written in Bone: Buried Lives of Jamestown and Colonial Maryland	Finalist	
2011	Ann Angel	Janis Joplin: Rise Up Singing	Winner	
2011	Jill Rubalcaba and Peter Robertshaw	Every Bone Tells a Story: Hominin Discoveries, Deductions, and Debates	Finalist	
2011	Rick Bowers	Spies of Mississippi: The True Story of the Spy Network that Tried to Destroy the Civil Rights Movement	Finalist	
2011	Paul Janeczko	The Dark Game: True Spy Stories	Finalist	
2011	Susan Campbell Bartoletti	They Called Themselves the KKK: The Birth of an American Terrorist Group	Finalist	
2012	Steve Sheinkin	The Notorious Benedict Arnold: A True Story of Adventure, Heroism, by Treachery	Winner	
2012	Karen Blumenthal	Bootleg: Murder, Moonshine, and the Lawless Years of Prohibition	Finalist	
2012	Susan Goldman Rubin	Music Was IT: Young Leonard Bernstein	Finalist	
2012	Marc Aronson and Marina Budhos	Sugar Changed the World: A Story of Magic, Spice, Slavery, Freedom and Science	Finalist	
2012	Sue Macy	Wheels of Change: How Women Rode the Bicycle to Freedom (With a Few Flat Tires Along the Way)	Finalist	
2013	Steve Sheinkin	Bomb: The Race to Build—and Steal—the World's Most Dangerous Weapon	Winner	
2013	Phillip Hoose	Moonbird: A Year on the Wind with the Great Survivor B95	Finalist	
2013	Karen Blumenthal	Steve Jobs: The Man Who Thought Different	Finalist	
2013	Deborah Hopkinson	Titanic: Voices from the Disaster	Finalist	
2013	Cynthia Levinson	We've Got a Job: The 1963 Birmingham Children's March	Finalist	
2014	Neal Bascomb	The Nazi Hunters: How a Team of Spies and Survivors Captured the World's Most Notorious Nazi	Winner	
2014	Tanya Lee Stone	Courage Has No Color: The True Story of the Triple Nickles, America's First Black Paratroopers	Finalist	
2014	Chip Kidd	Go: A Kidd's Guide to Graphic Design	Finalist	
2014	Martin W. Sandler	Imprisoned: The Betrayal of Japanese Americans During World War II	Finalist	
2014	James L. Swanson	The President Has Been Shot! The Assassination of John F. Kennedy	Finalist	
2015	Maya Van Wagenen	Popular: Vintage Wisdom for a Modern Geek	Winner	
2015	Emily Arnold McCully	Ida M. Tarbell: The Woman Who Challenged Big Business -- and Won!	Finalist	
2015	Shane Burcaw	Laughing at My Nightmare	Finalist	
2015	Candace Fleming	The Family Romanov: Murder, Rebellion, and the Fall of Imperial Russia	Finalist	
2015	Steve Sheinkin	The Port Chicago 50: Disaster, Mutiny, and the Fight for Civil Rights	Finalist	
2016	Steve Sheinkin	Most Dangerous: Daniel Ellsberg and the Secret History of the Vietnam War	Winner	
2016	Margarita Engle	Enchanted Air: Two Cultures, Two Wings: A Memoir	Finalist	
2016	M.T. Anderson	Symphony for the City of the Dead: Dmitri Shostakovich and the Siege of Leningrad	Finalist	
2016	Tim Grove	First Flight Around the World: The Adventures of the American Fliers Who Won the Race	Finalist	
2016	Nancy Plain	This Strange Wilderness: The Life and Art of John James Audubon	Finalist	
2017	John Lewis and Andrew Aydin with Nate Powell (Illus.)	March: Book Three	Winner	
2017	Karen Blumenthal	Hillary Rodham Clinton: A Woman Living History	Finalist	
2017	Kenneth C. Davis	In the Shadow of Liberty: The Hidden History of Slavery, Four Presidents, and Five Black Lives	Finalist	
2017	Pamela S. Turner with Gareth Hinds (Illus.)	Samurai Rising: The Epic Life of Minamoto Yoshitsune	Finalist	
2017	Linda Barrett Osborne	This Land Is Our Land: A History of American Immigration	Finalist	
2018	Deborah Heiligman	Vincent and Theo: The Van Gogh Brothers	Winner	
2018	Mary Beth Leatherdale and Lisa Charleyboy	#NotYourPrincess: Voices of Native American Women	Finalist	
2018	Marc Aronson and Marina Tamar Budhos	Eyes of the World: Robert Capa, Gerda Taro, and the Invention of Modern Photojournalism	Finalist	
2018	Dashka Slater	The 57 Bus: A True Story of Two Teenagers and the Crime That Changed Their Lives	Finalist	
2018	Martin W. Sandler	The Whydah: A Pirate Ship Feared, Wrecked, and Found	Finalist	
2019	Don Brown	The Unwanted: Stories of the Syrian Refugees	Winner	
2019	Elizabeth Partridge	Boots on the Ground: America's War in Vietnam	Finalist	
2019	Jarrett Krosoczka	Hey, Kiddo: How I Lost My Mother, Found My Father, and Dealt With Family Addiction	Finalist	
2019	Sonia Sotomayor	The Beloved World of Sonia Sotomayor	Finalist	
2019	John Hendrix	The Faithful Spy	Finalist	
2020	Rex Ogle	Free Lunch	Winner	
2020	Albert Marrin	A Light in the Darkness: Janusz Korczak, His Orphans, and the Holocaust	Finalist	
2020	Elizabeth Wein	A Thousand Sisters: The Heroic Airwomen of the Soviet Union in World War II	Finalist	
2020	Lynn Curlee	The Great Nijinsky: God of Dance	Finalist	
2020	Deborah Heiligman	Torpedoed: The True Story of the World War II Sinking of The Children's Ship	Finalist	
2021	Candace Fleming	The Rise & Fall of Charles Lindbergh	Winner	
2021	Christina Soontornvat	All Thirteen: The Incredible Cave Rescue of the Thai Boys' Soccer Team	Finalist	
2021	Amra Sabic-El-Rayess with Laura L. Sullivan	The Cat I Never Named: A True Story of Love, War, and Survival	Finalist	
2021	John Rocco	How We Got to the Moon: The People, Technology, and Daring Feats of Science Behind Humanity's Greatest Adventure	Finalist	
2021	Elizabeth Rusch	You Call This Democracy?: How to Fix Our Democracy and Deliver Power to the People	Finalist	
2022	Gail Jarrow	Ambushed!: The Assassination Plot Against President Garfield	Winner	
2022	Brandy Colbert	Black Birds in the Sky: The Story and Legacy of the 1921 Tulsa Race Massacre	Finalist	
2022	Paula Yoo	From a Whisper to a Rallying Cry: The Killing of Vincent Chin and the Trial that Galvanized the Asian American Movement	Finalist	
2022	Don Brown	In the Shadow of the Fallen Towers: The Seconds, Minutes, Hours, Days, Weeks, Months and Years After the 9/11 Attacks	Finalist	
2022	Amy Butler Greenfield	The Woman All Spies Fear: Code Breaker Elizebeth Smith Friedman and Her Hidden Life	Finalist	
2023	Tommie Smith and Derrick Barnes with Dawud Anyabwile (Illus.)	Victory. Stand!: Raising My Fist for Justice	Winner	
2023	Rex Ogle	Abuela, Don't Forget Me	Finalist	
2023	Gail Jarrow	American Murderer: The Parasite that Haunted the South	Finalist	
2023	Ariel Henley	A Face for Picasso: Coming of Age with Crouzon Syndrome	Finalist	
2023	Michael Eric Dyson and Marc Favreau	Unequal: A Story of America	Finalist	
2024	Dashka Slater	Accountable: The True Story of a Racist Social Media Account and the Teenagers Whose Lives It Changed	Winner	
2024	Ariel Aberg-Riger	America Redux: Visual Stories from Our Dynamic History	Finalist	
2024	Thien Pham	Family Style: Memories of an American from Vietnam	Finalist	
2024	Luma Mufleh	From Here	Finalist	
2024	Monica Edinger and Lesley Younge	Nearer my Freedom: The Interesting Life of Olaudah Equiano by Himself	Finalist	
2025	Paula Yoo	Rising from the Ashes: Los Angeles, 1992. Edward Jae Song Lee, Latasha Harlins, Rodney King, and a City on Fire	Winner	
2025	Elizabeth Rusch	A Greater Goal: The Epic Battle for Equal Pay in Women's Soccer—and Beyond	Finalist	
2025	Theo Parish	Homebody	Finalist	
2025	Candy J. Cooper	Shackled: A Tale of Wronged Kids, Rogue Judges, and a Town that Looked Away	Finalist	
2025	Angela Shanté	The Unboxing of a Black Girl	Finalist	
2026	Candace Fleming	Death in the Jungle: Murder, Betrayal, and the Lost Dream of Jonestown	Winner	
2026	Barb Rosenstock	American Spirits: The Famous Fox Sisters and the Mysterious Fad That Haunted a Nation	Finalist	
2026	Gail Jarrow	White House Secrets: Medical Lies and Cover-Ups	Finalist	
2026	Ann Bausum	White Lies: How the South Lost the Civil War, then Rewrote the History	Finalist	
2026	Nicholas Day, illustrated by Yas Imamura	A World Without Summer: A Volcano Erupts, A Creature Awakens, and the Sun Goes Out	Finalist	

=== Nominations ===
==== 2023 ====
Nominations
- Chasing the Truth: A Young Journalist's Guide to Investigative Reporting by Jodi Kantor, Megan Twohey, and Ruby Shamir
- Glowing Bunnies!?: Why We're Making Hybrids, Chimeras, and Clones by Jeff Campbell
- The Woman Who Split the Atom: The Life of Lise Meitner by Marissa Moss
- The Heartbeat of Wounded Knee: Life in Native America by David Treuer
- How to Build a Human: In Seven Evolutionary Steps by Pamela S. Turner
- How to Money: Your Ultimate Visual Guide to the Basics of Finance by Jean Chatzky, Kathryn Tuggle, and Nina Cosford
- In Harm's Way (Young Readers Edition): The Sinking of the USS Indianapolis and the Story of Its Survivors by Doug Stanton and Michael J. Tougias (adaptor)
- Killers of the Flower Moon: The Osage Murders and the Birth of the FBI: Adapted for Young Readers by David Grann
- Messy Roots: A Graphic Memoir of a Wuhanese American by Laura Gao
- Murder Among Friends: How Leopold and Loeb Tried to Commit the Perfect Crime by Candace Fleming
- Numb to This: Memoir of a Mass Shooting by Kindra Neely
- Queer Ducks (and Other Animals): The Natural World of Animal Sexuality by Eliot Schrefer
- The Race of the Century: The Battle to Break the Four-Minute Mile by Neil Bascomb
- Overground Railroad: The Green Book and the Roots of Black Travel in America by Candacy Taylor
- Revolution in Our Time: The Black Panther Party's Promise to the People by Kekla Magoon
- Saving Earth: Climate Change and the Fight for Our Future by Olugbemisola Rhuday-Perkovich
- Seen and Unseen: What Dorothea Lange, Toyo Miyatake, and Ansel Adams's Photographs Reveal About the Japanese American Incarceration by Elizabeth Partridge and Lauren Tamaki
- Sky Wolf's Call: The Gift of Indigenous Knowledge by Eldon Yellowhorn and Kathy Lowinger
- Star Child by Ibi Zoboi
- The Sun Does Shine: An Innocent Man, A Wrongful Conviction, and the Long Path to Justice by Anthony Ray Hinton and Lara Love Hardin
- Underground Fire: Hope, Sacrifice, and Courage in the Cherry Mine Disaster by Sally M. Walker
- White Fragility: Why Understanding Racism Can Be So Hard for White People Adapted for Young Adults by Toni Graves Williamson, Ali Michael, and Robin DiAngelo
- The Greatest Stories Ever Played: Video Games and the Evolution of Storytelling by Dustin Hansen

==== 2022 ====
Nominations
- Singled Out: The True Story of Glenn Burke by Andrew Maraniss
- Meltdown: Earthquake, Tsunami, and Nuclear Disaster in Fukushima by Deirdre Langeland
- In the Shadow of the Moon: America, Russia, and the Hidden History of the Space Race by Amy Cherrix
- Punching Bag by Rex Ogle
- Call and Response: The Story of Black Lives Matter by Veronica Chambers
- Separate No More: The Long Road to Brown v. Board of Education by Lawrence Goldstone
- Everything You Wanted to Know about Indians But Were Afraid to Ask (Young Readers Edition) by Anton Treuer
- Run: Book One by John Lewis and Andrew Aydin and illustrated by L. Fury and Nate Powell
- The Burning: Black Wall Street and the Tulsa Race Massacre of 1921 (Young Readers Edition) by Tim Madigan adapted by Hilary Beard
- When Can We Go Back to America? Voices of Japanese American Incarceration During WWII by Susan H. Kamei
- The Curse of the Mummy: Uncovering Tutankhamun's Tomb by Candace Fleming

2021

Nominations
- All Thirteen: The Incredible Cave Rescue of the Thai Boys' Soccer Team by Christina Soontornvat
- Almost American Girl by Robin Ha
- Apple (skin to the core) by Eric Gansworth
- Banned Book Club by Kim Hyun Sook and Ryan Estrada
- Blood and Germs: The Civil War Battle Against Wounds and Disease by Gail Jarrow
- The Cat I Never Named: A True Story of Love, War, and Survival by Amra Sabic-El-Rayess with Laura L. Sullivan
- Dancing At the Pity Party by Tyler Feder
- Dragon Hoops created by Gene Luen Yang and color by Lark Pien
- How We Got To the Moon: The People, Technology, and Daring Feats of Science Behind Humanity's Greatest Adventure by John Rocco
- Jane Against the World: Roe v. Wade and the Fight For Reproductive Rights by Karen Blumenthal
- Lifting As We Climb: Black Women's Battle for the Ballot Box by Evette Dionne
- One Real American: The Life of Ely S. Parker, Seneca Sachem and Civil War General by Joseph Bruchac
- Poisoned Water: How the Citizens of Flint, Michigan, Fought for Their Lives and Warned the Nation by Candy J. Cooper and Marc Aronson
- Race Through the Skies: The Week the World Learned to Fly by Martin W. Sandler
- The Rise & Fall of Charles Lindbergh by Candace Fleming
- Say Her Name (poems to Empower) by Zetta Elliott
- Stamped: Racism, Anti-Racism, and You: A Remix of the National Book Award-Winning Stamped From the Beginning by Jason Reynolds and Ibram X. Kendi
- Strongman: The Rise of Five Dictators and the Fall of Democracy by Kenneth C. Davis
- We Are Power: How Non-Violent Activism Changes the World by Todd Hasak-Lowy
- When Stars Are Scattered by Victoria Jamieson and Omar Mohamed
- You Call This Democracy?: How to Fix Our Democracy and Deliver Power to the People by Elizabeth Rusch

2020

Nominations
- The Fight Against AIDS in America by Ann Bausum
- What Linnaeus Saw: A Scientist's Quest to Name Every Living Thing by Karen Magnuson Beil
- This Promise of Change: One Girl's Story in the Fight for School Equality by Jo Ann Allen Boyce and Debbie Levy
- A Queer History of the United States for Young People by Michael Bronski and Richie Chevat
- The Great Nijinsky: God of Dance by Lynn Curlee
- Soaring Earth: A Companion Memoir to Enchanted Air by Margarita Engle
- Spies: The Secret Showdown between America and Russia for Young Readers by Marc Favreau
- Ordinary Hazards by Nikki Grimes
- Torpedoed: The True Story of the World War II Sinking of "The Children's Ship" by Deborah Heiligman
- The Poison Eaters: Fighting Danger and Fraud in Our Food and Drugs by Gail Jarrow
- Locked in Ice: Nansen's Daring Quest for the North Pole by Peter Lourie
- The Far Away Brothers: Two Teenage Immigrants Making a Life in America by Lauren Markham
- A Light in the Darkness: Janusz Korczak, His Orphans, and the Holocaust by Albert Marrin
- Funny, You Don't Look Autistic: A Comedian's Guide to Life on the Spectrum by Michael McCreary
- The Miracle & Tragedy of the Dionne Quintuplet by Sarah Miller
- It's Trevor Noah: Born a Crime by Trevor Noah
- Free Lunch by Rex Ogle
- 1919: The Year That Changed America by Martin W. Sandler
- Born to Fly: The First Women's Air Race Across America by Steve Sheinkin
- Deadly Aim: The Civil War Story of Michigan's Anishinaabe Sharpshooters by Sally M. Walker
- Enemy Child: The Story of Norman Mineta, a Boy Imprisoned in a Japanese American Internment Camp during World War II by Andrea Warren
- A Thousand Sisters: The Heroic Airwomen of the Soviet Union in World War II by Elizabeth Wein

==== 2019 ====
Nominations
- 1968: Today's Authors Explore a Year of Rebellion, Revolution, and Change, edited by Marc Aronson
- Americanized: Rebel without a Green Card, by Sara Saedi. -
- ATTUCKS! Oscar Robertson and the Team that Awakened a City, by Phillip Hoose
- Back From the Brink, Nancy Castaldo
- Becoming Kareem: Growing Up on and Off the Court, by Kareem Abdul-Jabbar
- Blacklisted, by Larry Dane Brimner
- Bonnie and Clyde: the Making of a Legend, by Karen Blumenthal
- Coco Chanel, by Susan Rubin
- Crash: The Great Depression and the Rise and Fall of America, by Marc Favreau - Little Brown Books
- D-Day: The World War II Invasion That Changed History, by Deborah Hopkinson
- Deep Dark Blue: A Memoir of Survival, by Polo Tate.
- Eleanor Roosevelt: Fighter for Justice, by Ilene Cooper
- Facing Frederick: the Life of Frederick Douglass, A Monumental American Man, by Tonya Bolden
- Feathered Serpent, Dark Heart of Sky, by David Bowles
- Google It! A History of Google, by Anna Crowley Redding.
- Life Inside My Mind: 31 Authors Share Their Personal Struggles, by Jessica Burkhart
- Life on Surtsey: Iceland's Upstart Island, by Loree Griffin Burns.
- Mary Shelley: The Strange True Tale of Frankenstein's Creator, by Catherine Reef
- Match Forward, Girl: From Young Warrior to Little Rock Nine, by Melba Pattillo Beals
- More Deadly than War: The Hidden History of the Spanish Flu and the First World War, by Kenneth C. Davis
- My Family Divided: One Girl's Journey of Home, Loss, and Hope, by Diane Guerrero
- Nevertheless, We Persisted, edited by Amy Klobuchar
- Notorious RBG: Life and Time of Ruth Bader Ginsburg, by Irin Carmon
- Photographic: The Life of Graciela Iturbide, by Isabel Quintero.
- Spooked!, by Gail Jarrow
- The Disappearing Spoon: And Other True Tales of Madness, Love, and the History of the World from the Periodic Table of the Elements, by Sam Kean
- The Girl Who Drew Butterflies, by Joyce Sidman.
- The Grand Escape: the Greatest Prison Breakout of the 20th Century, by Neal Bascomb
- The Hyena Scientist, by Sy Montgomery.
- The Wilhelm Gustloff Story, by Michael Capek
- Things We Haven't Said, edited by Erin Moulton
- Unpunished Murder: Massacre at Colfax and the Quest for Justice, by Lawrence Goldstone
- Votes for Women! American Suffragists and the Battle for the Ballot, by Winifred Conkling
- Walking is a Way of Knowing, by Madhuri Ramesh

==== 2018 ====
Nominations
- Brockenbrough, Martha. Alexander Hamilton, Revolutionary.
- Green, Katie. Lighter Than My Shadow.
- Hennessey, Jonathan and art by Jack McGowan. The Comic Book Story of Video Games: The Incredible History of the Electronic Gaming Revolution.
- Jensen, Kelly, ed. Here We Are: 44 Voices Write, Draw and Speak About Feminism for the Real World.
- Levinson, Cynthia and Sanford Levinson. Fault Lines in the Constitution: The Framers, Their Fights, and the Flaws that Affect Us Today.
- Losure, Mary. Isaac the Alchemist: Secrets of Isaac Newton, Reveal'd.
- Sheinkin, Steve. Undefeated: Jim Thorpe and the Carlisle Indian School Football Team.
- Solomon, Andrew. Far From the Tree: How Children and Their Parents Learn to Accept One Another...Our Differences Unite Us (Young Adult Edition).
- Walden, Tillie. Spinning.
- Weatherford, Carole Boston and illustrated by Eric Velásquez Schomburg: The Man Who Built a Library.

==== 2017 ====
Nominations
- Bascomb, Neal. Sabotage: The Mission to Destroy Hitler's Atomic Bomb.
- Freedman, Russell. Vietnam: A History of the War.
- Marrin, Albert. Uprooted: The Japanese American Experience during World War II.
- Miller, Sarah. The Borden Murders: Lizzie Borden and the Trial of the Century.
- Rubin, Susan Goldman. Brown v. Board of Education: A Fight for Simple Justice.
- Stelson, Caren. Sachiko: A Nagasaki Bomb Survivor's Story.
- Sweet, Melissa. Some Writer! The Story of E. B. White.
- Wallace, Rich and Sandra Neil Wallace. Blood Brother: Jonathan Daniels and His Sacrifice for Civil Rights.
- Woelfle, Gretchen. Answering the Cry for Freedom: Stories of African Americans and the American Revolution.

==== 2016 ====
Nominations
- Stonewall: Breaking Out in the Fight for Gay Rights by Ann Bausum
- The Boys in the Boat by Daniel James Brown
- The Boys Who Challenged Hitler: Knud Pedersen and the Churchill Club by Phillip Hoose
- Fatal Fever: Tracking Down Typhoid Mary by Gail Jarrow
- The Boy Who Harnessed the Wind: Young Readers Edition by William Kamkwamba and Bryan Mealer
- Rhythm Ride: A Road Trip through the Motown Sound by Andrea Davis Pinkney
- Hot Pink: The Life and Fashions of Elsa Schiaparelli by Susan Goldman Rubin
- Untamed: The Wild Life of Jane Goodall by Anita Silvey
- Honor Girl by Maggie Thrash

==== 2015 ====
Nominations
- Strike! The Farm Workers' Fight for Their Rights by Larry Dane Brimner
- Pure Grit: How American World War II Nurses Survived Battle and Prison Camp In The Pacific by Mary Cronk Farrell
- Eyes Wide Open: Going Behind the Environmental Headlines by Paul Fleischman
- Because They Marched: The People's Campaign for Voting Rights That Changed America by Russell Freedman
- Red Madness: How A Medical Mystery Changed What We Eat by Gail Jarrow
- Beyond Magenta: Transgender Teens Speak Out by Susan Kuklin
- Leaving China: An Artist Paints His World War II Childhood by James McMullan
- The Freedom Summer Murders by Don Mitchell
- Tomboy: A Graphic Memoir by Liz Prince
- Freedom Summer: The 1964 Struggle for Civil Rights in Mississippi by Susan Goldman Rubin
- The White House Is Burning, August 24, 1814 by Jane Sutcliffe
- Boundaries: How The Mason-Dixon Line Settled A Family Feud And Divided A Nation by Sally M. Walker
- Brown Girl Dreaming by Jacqueline Woodson

==== 2014 ====
Nominations
- Tillie Pierce: Teen Eyewitness to the Battle of Gettysburg by Tanya Anderson
- Emancipation Proclamation: Lincoln and the Dawn of Liberty by Tonya Bolden
- Becoming Ben Franklin: How a Candle-Maker's Son Helped Light the Flame of Liberty by Russell Freedman
- Mountains Beyond Mountains: The Quest of Dr. Paul Farmer, A Man Who Would Cure the World by Tracy Kidder and Michael French
- March (Book One) by John Lewis and Andrew Aydin, Illustrated by Nate Powell
- Fourth Down and Inches: Concussions and Football's Make-or-Break Moment by Carla Killough McClafferty
- Call of the Klondike: A True Gold Rush Adventure by David Meissner and Kim Richardson
- Women of the Frontier: 16 Tales of Trailblazing Homesteaders by Brandon Marie Miller
- Kennedy's Last Days: The Assassination That Defined a Generation by Bill O'Reilly
- Eruption!: Volcanoes and the Science of Saving Lives by Elizabeth Rusch
- Branded by the Pink Triangle by Ken Setterington
- Lincoln's Grave Robbers by Steve Sheinkin

==== 2013 ====
Nominations
- Chuck Close Face Book by Chuck Close
- The Amazing Harry Kellar: Great American Magician by Gail Jarrow
- Temple Grandin: How the Girl Who Loved Cows Embraced Autism and Changed the World by Sy Montgomery
- Invincible Microbe: Tuberculosis and the Never-Ending Search for a Cure by Jim Murphy and Alison Blank
- The Mighty Mars Rovers: The Incredible Adventures of Spirit and Opportunity by Elizabeth Rusch
- Impossible Rescue: The True Story of an Amazing Arctic Adventure by Martin W. Sandler
- Blizzard of Glass: The Halifax Explosion of 1917 by Sally M. Walker
- Their Skeletons Speak: Kennewick Man and the Paleoamerican World by Sally M. Walker
- Charles Dickens and the Street Children of London by Andrea Warren

==== 2012 ====
Nominations
- Can I See Your I.D.?: True Stories of False Identities by Chris Barton
- Unraveling Freedom: The Battle for Democracy on the Home Front During World War I by Ann Bausum
- How They Croaked: The Awful Ends of the Awfully Famous by Georgia Bragg
- Elizabeth Cady Stanton and Susan B. Anthony: A Friendship That Changed the World by Penny Colman
- Elephant Talk: The Surprising Science of Elephant Communication by Ann Downer
- Amelia Lost: The Life and Disappearance of Amelia Earhart by Candace Fleming
- Father Abraham: Lincoln and His Sons by Harold Holzer
- Scribbling Women: True Tales From Astonishing Lives by Marthe Jocelyn
- Mysterious Bones: The Story of the Kennewick Man by Katherine Kirkpatrick
- World Without Fish by Mark Kurlansky
- Flesh & Blood So Cheap: The Triangle Fire & Its Legacy by Albert Marrin
- The Many Faces of George Washington by Carla Killough McClafferty
- Heart and Soul: The Story of America and African Americans by Kadir Nelson
- Jane Austen: A Life Revealed by Catherine Reef
- Into the Unknown: How Great Explorers Found Their Way by Land, Sea, and Air by Stewart Ross
- I. M. Pei: Architect of Time, Place, and Purpose by Jill Rubalcaba
- Wideness & Wonder: The Life and Art of Georgia O'Keeffe by Susan Goldman Rubin
- Witches!: The Absolutely True Tale of Disaster in Salem by Rosalyn Schanzer
- To Timbuktu: Nine Countries, Two People, One True Story by Casey Scieszka
- Ghosts on the Fog: The Untold Story of Alaska's WWII Invasion by Samantha Seiple
- Tom Thumb : the Remarkable True Story of a Man in Miniature by George Sullivan
- Terezin: Voices from the Holocaust by Ruth Thomson
- Raggin' Jazzin' Rockin': A History of American Musical Instrument Makers by Susan VanHecke

==== 2011 ====
Nominations
- Frederick Douglass: A Noble Life by David A. Adler
- FDR's Alphabet Soup: New Deal America by Tonya Bolden
- Lost Boy, Lost Girl: Escaping Civil War in the Sudan by John Bul Dau
- Watch This Space: Designing, Defending and Sharing Public Spaces by Hadley Dyer
- Sir Charlie Chaplin: the Funniest Man in the World by Sid Fleischmann
- The Rise and Fall of Senator Joe McCarthy by James Giblin
- Sex: A Book for Teens: An Uncensored Guide to Your Body, Sex, and Safety by Nikol Hasler
- Teen Cyberbullying Investigated: Where Do Your Rights End and Consequences Begin? by Tom Jacobs
- We Are Not Beasts of Burden: Cesar Chavez and the Delano Grape Strike by Stuart Kallen
- Get Real: What Kind of World Are You Buying? by Mara Rockliff
- The Smart Aleck's Guide to American History by Adam Selzer
- The Good, the Bad and the Barbie: A Doll's History and Her Impact on Us by Tanya Lee Stone
- Frozen Secrets: Antarctica Revealed by Sally M. Walker
- The Brave Escape of Edith Wharton: A Biography by Connie Wooldridge
- Simeon's Story: An Eyewitness Account of the Kidnapping of Emmett Till by Simeon Wright and Herb Boyd

==== 2010 ====
Nominations
- Rachael Ray: Food Entrepreneur by Dennis Abrams
- Mr. Lincoln's High-Tech War by Thomas B. Allen and Roger MacBride Allen
- Gay America: Struggle for Equality by Linas Alsenas
- The War to End All Wars: The Story of World War I by Jack Batten
- Denied, Detained, Deported: Stories from the Dark Side of American Immigration by Ann Bausum
- Beyond: A Solar System Voyage by Michael Benson
- Diego: Bigger Than Life by Carmen T. Bernier-Grand
- Gettysburg: The Graphic Novel by C. M. Butzer
- Leaving Glorytown: One Boy's Struggle under Castro by Eduardo F. Calcines
- Harry Houdini for Kids: His Life and Adventures with 21 Magic Tricks and Illusions by Laurie Carlson
- Mission Control, This is Apollo: The Story of the First Voyages to the Moon by Andrew Chaikin and Victoria Kohl
- The Word Snoop by Ursula Dubosarsky
- Say What? The Weird and Mysterious Journey of the English Language by Gena K. Gorrell
- Babe Ruth by Wilborn Hampton
- The Girls' Guide to Rocking: How to Start a Band, Books Gigs, and Get Rolling to Rock Stardom by Jessica Hopper
- The Secret of the Yellow Death: A True Story of Medical Sleuthing by Suzanne Jurmain
- 1968 by Michael T. Kaufman
- Harper Lee by Kerry Madden
- Years of Dust: The Story of the Dust Bowl by Albert Marrin
- The Mysteries of Beethoven's Hair by Russell Martin and Lydia Nibley
- Anne Frank: Her Life in Words and Pictures from the Archives of the Anne Frank House by Menno Metselaar and Ruud Van der Rol
- Truce: The Day the Soldiers Stopped Fighting by Jim Murphy
- Sweethearts of Rhythm: The Story Of The Greatest All-Girl Swing Band In The World by Marilyn Nelson
- Encyclopedia of the End: Mysterious Death in Fact, Fancy, Folklore, and More by Deborah Noyes
- After Gandhi: One Hundred Years of Nonviolent Resistance by Anne Sibley O'Brien and Perry Edmond O'Brien
- Traveling the Freedom Road: From Slavery and the Civil War through Reconstruction by Linda Barrett Osborne
- Marching For Freedom: Walk Together, Children, and Don't You Grow Weary by Elizabeth Partridge
- The Omnivore's Dilemma: The Secrets behind What You Eat by Michael Pollan and Richie Chevat
- The Vermeer Interviews: Conversations with Seven Works of Art by Bob Raczka
- Ernest Hemingway: A Writer's Life by Catherine Reef
- The Anne Frank Case: Simon Wiesenthal's Search for the Truth by Susan Rubin
- The Secret Subway: The Fascinating Tale of an Amazing Feat of Engineering by Martin W. Sandler
- Ghosts of War: The True Story of a 19-year-old GI by Ryan Smithson
- The Duel: The Parallel Lives of Alexander Hamilton and Aaron Burr by Judith St. George
- The Frog Scientist by Pamela S. Turner
- A Life in the Wild: George Schaller's Struggle to Save the Last Great Beasts by Pamela S. Turner
- Under Siege!: Three Children at the Civil War Battle for Vicksburg by Andrea Warren
