= Something Out of Nothing =

Something Out of Nothing may refer to:

- "Something Outa Nothing", a song written by Simon May, Stewart James and Bradley James
- Something Out of Nothing: Marie Curie and Radium, a book by Carla Killough McClafferty
- Something Out of Nothing (film), a 1979 Bulgarian comedy film
- Ex nihilo, a concept chiefly in philosophical or theological contexts
