= Rick Bowers =

American author

Rick Bowers is an American author and former newspaper journalist and editor. He wrote two non-fiction books published by National Geographic.

== Early life and education ==
Bowers was born in Long Beach, California.

== Editing, newspapers ==
Bowers, a former reporter and editor for more than 15 years, started his newspaper career reporting for The Patriot Ledger, of Quincy, Massachusetts. He also worked at the Miami Herald, and USA Today. His articles have been published in The Washington Post, the Chicago Tribune, The Philadelphia Inquirer, and Time magazine.

== Writing career ==
Bowers' first book was Spies of Mississippi about the Mississippi Sovereignty Commission. Spies of Mississippi is the true story of the spy network formed to undercut the civil rights movement in the 1950s and 60s. It has a foreword by Wade Henderson. It was a finalist for the 2011 YALSA Award for Excellence in Nonfiction.

Bowers' second book, Superman Versus the Ku Klux Klan, is the story of how Superman was used as a weapon against the "Men of Hate" in a trail-blazing radio series in 1947.

Spies of Mississippi was developed into a documentary by director and producer Dawn M. Porter of Trilogy Films. Spies of Mississippi recently aired on the PBS Independent Lens series in February 2014. The film has garnered critical acclaim and won numerous awards on the Independent Film circuit. In 2014, an online version, Spies of Mississippi: The Appumentary was released, combining elements from the book and the film into an app.

== Multimedia ==
Bowers, currently Vice President for Innovation at AARP's Life Reimagined Institute, works on transformational programs for businesses, non-profits and start-ups.

In collaboration with AARP, the Leadership Conference on Civil and Human Rights, and the Library of Congress (LCCR), he directed Voices of Civil Rights, a multimedia project that gathered thousands of first-hand accounts, oral histories and photographs of the Civil Rights Movement to form the world's largest archive of testimonials from the era. The collection, housed at the American Folk Life Center of the Library of Congress, includes letters and short memoirs concerning the civil rights movement. The Voices of Civil Rights multimedia project was later turned into a History Channel documentary. It won an Emmy and Peabody Award.
