= Pamela S. Turner =

American children's book author

- Education: University of California, Irvine (BA); University of California, Berkeley (MPH)
- Occupation: Children's author
- Writing career
- Years active: 2004-present
- Website: pamelasturner.com

Pamela S. Turner is an American author of nonfiction books for children.

Turner earned a Bachelor of Arts in social science from the University of California, Irvine, followed by a Master of Public Health from the University of California, Berkeley. She has lived in many countries, including Japan, Kenya, the Marshall Islands, the Philippines, South Africa, and the United States. As of 2026, she lives in Oakland, California and Newberg, Oregon. She is married and has three children.

== Notable works ==
=== Hachiko (2004) ===
Turner's first book, Hachiko: The True Story of a Loyal Dog, illustrated by Tan Nascimbene, was published by Houghton in 2004. Booklist and the Cooperative Children's Book Center (CCBC) named it one of the best children's book of the year.

=== Gorilla Doctors (2005) ===
Gorilla Doctors: Saving Endangered Great Apes was published by Houghton Mifflin in 2005. In addition to being a Junior Library Guild book, the CCBC and the National Science Teaching Association (NSTA) named it one of the year's best children's books. The Association for Library Service to Children (ALSC) also included it on their 2006 list of Notable Children's Books.

=== A Life in the Wild (2008) ===
A Life in the Wild: George Schaller's Struggle to Save the Last Great Beasts, published by Farrar, Straus, and Giroux in 2008, is a biography of American naturalist George Schaller. The book won the 2009 Golden Kite Award for Nonfiction, and was nominated for the 2010 YALSA Award for Excellence in Nonfiction. The NSTA included it on their list of the year's best children's books.

=== The Frog Scientist (2009) ===
The Frog Scientist, published by Houghton Mifflin Harcourt in 2009, is a biography of American biologist Tyrone Hayes.

It won the 2009 Cybils Award for Middle Grade and Young Adult Nonfiction. The following year, it was an honor book for the Orbis Pictus Award and was nominated for the YALSA Award for Excellence in Nonfiction. Booklist and the CCBC named it one of the year's best children's books. The ALSC also included it on their 2010 list of Notable Children's Books.

=== Project Seahorse (2010) ===
Project Seahorse, published by Houghton Mifflin in 2010, is a nonfiction children's book about Project Seahorse, a marine conservation organization in Canada. The CCBC named it one of the year's best children's books.

=== The Dolphins of Shark Bay (2013) ===
The Dolphins of Shark Bay, published by Houghton Mifflin in 2013, is a nonfiction children's book about the dolphins of Shark Bay. Bank Street College of Education named it one of the year's best books for children ages 9–12.

=== Crow Smarts (2016) ===
Crow Smarts: Inside the Brain of the World's Brightest Bird, published in 2016 by Harcourt, is a nonfiction book about New Caledonian crows. The book includes photographs by Andy Comins and art by Guido FIlippo.

In addition to being a Junior Library Guild book, Bank Street College of Education named Crow Smarts a book of outstanding merit for children ages 9–12. The CCBC, The Horn Book, and the New York Public Library also included it on their list of the best books of the year.

=== Samurai Rising (2016) ===
Samurai Rising: The Epic Life of Minamoto Yoshitsune, illustrated by Gareth Hinds and published in 2016 by Charlesbridge, is a nonfiction book about the life of 12th-century Samurai Minamoto no Yoshitsune. The audiobook is narrated by Brian Nishii.

In addition to being a Junior Library Guild book, Samurai Rising was included on lists of the best children's books of the year by Bank Street College of Education, Booklist, the The Bulletin of the Center for Children's Books, the Chicago Public Library, Kirkus Reviews, the New York Public Library, and School Library Journal. The ALSC included it on their 2017 list of Notable Children's Books. It was also a finalist for the 2017 YALSA Award for Excellence in Nonfiction and a nominee for the 2019 William Allen White Children's Book Award for Grades 6-8.

=== How to Build a Human (2022) ===
How to Build a Human: In Seven Evolutionary Steps, illustrated by John Gurche and published in 2022 by Charlesbridge, is a nonfiction book about the history of Homo sapiens, tracing back to Stone Age history.

In addition to being a Junior Library Guild book, Bank Street College of Education, The Horn Book, and Kirkus Reviews named How to Build a Human one of the year's best books for children. The ALSC included it on their 2023 list of Notable Children's Books. That year, it was a finalist for the Golden Kite Award for Nonfiction Text for Older Readers and was nominated for the YALSA Award for Excellence in Nonfiction.

=== Comet Chaser (2024) ===
Comet Chaser: The True Cinderella Story of the First Professional Woman Astronomer, illustrated by Vivien Mildenberger and published in 2024 by Chronicle Books, is a nonfiction book about German-British astronomer Caroline Herschel.

Comet Chaser was included on lists of the best children's books of the year by Chicago Public Library and Bank Street College of Education. In 2025, it was an honor book for the Golden Kite Award for Nonfiction Text for Younger Readers.

== Awards and honors ==
Five of Turner's books are Junior Library Guild selections: Hachiko, Gorilla Doctors, Crow Smarts, Samurai Rising, and How to Build a Human. Several of her books have been named on lists of the year's best children's books, including Hachiko, Gorilla Doctors, Life on Earth -- and Beyond, The Frog Scientist, Project Seahorse, The Dolphins of Shark Bay, Crow Smarts, Samurai Rising, How to Build a Human, and Comet Chaser. (Note: Where sources are not provided here, please view the sections above.)

Awards for Turner's works
Work	Year	Award	Result	Ref.
Comet Chaser	2025	Golden Kite Award for Nonfiction Text for Younger Readers	Honor	
The Frog Scientist	2009	Cybils Award for Middle Grade and Young Adult Nonfiction	Winner	
The Frog Scientist	2010	Orbis Pictus Award	Honor	
The Frog Scientist	2010	YALSA Award for Excellence in Nonfiction	Nominee	
How to Build a Human	2023	Golden Kite Award for Nonfiction Text for Older Readers	Finalist	
How to Build a Human	2023	YALSA Award for Excellence in Nonfiction	Nominee	
A Life in the Wild	2009	Golden Kite Award for Nonfiction	Winner	
A Life in the Wild	2010	YALSA Award for Excellence in Nonfiction	Nominee	
Samurai Rising	2017	YALSA Award for Excellence in Nonfiction	Finalist	
Samurai Rising	2019	William Allen White Children's Book Award for Grades 6-8	Nominee	

== Publications ==
- Hachiko: The True Story of a Loyal Dog. Illustrated by Yan Nascimbene. Houghton. 2004. ISBN 0618140948.
- Gorilla Doctors: Saving Endangered Great Apes. Scientists in the Field series. Houghton Mifflin. 2005. ISBN 978-0-618-44555-4.
- Life on Earth -- and Beyond: An Astrobiologist's Quest. Charlesbridge. 2008. ISBN 978-1-58089-133-2. OCLC 78893158.
- A Life in the Wild: George Schaller's Struggle to Save the Last Great Beasts. Farrar, Straus and Giroux. 2008.
- The Frog Scientist. Scientists in the Field series. Photographs by Andy Comins. Houghton Mifflin Harcourt. 2009. ISBN 978-0-618-71716-3.
- Prowling the Seas: Exploring the Hidden World of Ocean Predators. New York: Walker & Co. 2009. ISBN 978-0-8027-9748-3.
- Project Seahorse. Scientists in the Field series. Photographs by Scott Tuason. Boston: Houghton Mifflin. 2010. ISBN 978-0-547-20713-1.
- The Dolphins of Shark Bay. Scientists in the Field series. Photographs by Scott Tuason. New York, New York: Houghton Mifflin Harcourt. 2013. ISBN 978-0-547-71638-1.
- Crow Smarts: Inside the Brain of the World's Brightest Bird. Scientists in the Field series. Photographs by Andy Comins, with art by Guido de Filippo. Boston: Houghton Mifflin Harcourt. 2016. ISBN 978-0-544-41619-2. OCLC 1001883432.
- Samurai Rising: The Epic Life of Minamoto Yoshitsune. Illustrated by Gareth Hinds; Narrated by Brian Nishii. Watertown, MA: Charlesbridge. 2016. ISBN 978-1-58089-584-2.
- How to Build a Human: In Seven Evolutionary Steps. Illustrated by John Gurche. Charlesbridge Publishing, Incorporated, Charlesbridge. 2022. ISBN 978-1-62354-250-4.
- Comet Chaser: The True Cinderella Story of the First Professional Woman Astronomer. Illustrated by Vivien Mildenberger. Chronicle Books. 2024. ISBN 978-1-4521-4543-3.
