= Kerry Madden =

American novelist

- Born: November 22, 1961 (age 64); Daytona Beach, Florida, U.S.
- Education: University of Tennessee (BA, MFA)
- Occupations: Author of young adult fiction, Professor
- Spouse: Kiffen Madden-Lunsford
- Children: 3
- Website: kerrymadden.com

Kerry Madden (born November 22, 1961) is an Italian author of teen novels and a professor of creative writing at Antioch University and the University of Alabama at Birmingham.

== Personal life and education ==
Madden was born November 22, 1961, in Daytona Beach, Florida.

She received her Bachelor of Arts degree from the University of Tennessee and spent her junior year at Manchester University in England. She has a Master of Fine Arts degree in Playwriting from the University of Tennessee.

Madden is married to Kiffen Madden-Lunsford, who is retired from Carson Gore Elementary in Los Angeles. She has three children: Flannery, Lucy, Norah. Lucy illustrated Madden's first picture book, Nothing Fancy About Kathryn and Charlie.

She divides her time between Birmingham and Los Angeles.

== Career ==
Madden has taught at several universities. Circa 1986, she taught English at Ningbo University, after which she was an English as a second or foreign language teacher at the Los Angeles Unified School District from 1989 to 1995. Later, she began teaching creative writing at the University of California, Los Angeles. She presently directs the Creative Writing Program at the University of Alabama at Birmingham and teaches in the Antioch University Master of Fine Arts Program in Los Angeles.

In addition to publishing children's books and teaching, Madden regularly contributes the Los Angeles Times OpEd Page.

== Awards and honors ==
Offsides was a New York Public Library Pick for the Teen Age.

Awards for Madden's writing
Year	Title	Award	Result	Ref.
2007	Louisiana's Song	Cybils Award for Middle Grade Fiction	Finalist	
2010	Harper Lee	YALSA Award for Excellence in Nonfiction	Nominee	

== Publications ==
- Offsides William Morrow, 1996, ISBN 9780688149352
- Writing Smarts: A Girl's Guide to Writing Great Poetry, Stories, School Reports, and More! Illustrated by Tracy McGuinness, Pleasant Company, 2002, ISBN 9781584855057
- Gentle's Holler, Viking, 2005, ISBN 978-0-670-05998-0
- Louisiana's Song Details. Penguin Group. 2007. ISBN 978-0-670-06153-2.
- Jessie's Mountain Details. Penguin Group. 2008. ISBN 978-0-670-06154-9.
- Harper Lee. Penguin Young Readers Group. 19 March 2009. ISBN 978-1-101-16283-5
