= Hannah and Shane Burcaw =

- Born: Hannah Aylward and Shane Robert Burcaw; 1995 and 1992

Instagram information
- Pages: Hannah Burcaw; Shane Burcaw; Laughing At My Nightmare, Inc.
- Years active: 2012-
- Genre: Romantic comedy
- Followers: 1.7M

YouTube information
- Channel: Squirmy and Grubs
- Years active: 2018-
- Genre: Romantic comedy
- Subscribers: 1.86M
- Views: 805,249,279
- Last updated: November 12, 2026
- Website: www.squirmyandgrubs.com

Hannah (née Aylward, b. 1995) and Shane Burcaw (b. 1992), also known as Squirmy and Grubs after their YouTube channel, are an American interabled couple, relationship vloggers, authors, and disability activists.

Shane Burcaw was born with spinal muscular atrophy, due to which he has been in a wheelchair since the age of two, and does not have the strength to care for himself on his own. A gifted student, after his first year of college he began a biographical humorous blog called "Laughing at My Nightmare". LAMN became popular, leading to a newspaper column, multiple books, award winning short films, and a non-profit disability fundraising organization.

Hannah Aylward grew up as an athlete, swimming competitively in childhood and college. She saw one of the short films about Burcaw, and reached out to him. They fell in love, moved in together, and started "Squirmy and Grubs" about their life, marrying in 2020.

The Burcaws have been subject to trolling from anonymous Internet commentators who call them abnormal and question Hannah's motivations to be with Shane. They use their relative fame to advocate on behalf of the disabled. Hannah appeared with Shane on the cover of his third book, and they wrote the fourth book, about interabled couples, together.

== Shane Burcaw ==
=== Early life and education ===
Shane Robert Burcaw was born in 1992, and grew up in Bethlehem, Pennsylvania. His parents are Jonathan and Susan (née Varga) Burcaw, and he has one younger brother, Andrew.

Burcaw was placed into the gifted support class at Bethlehem's Lincoln Elementary School, then attended Freedom High School, graduating in 2010. He started Moravian College majoring in journalism, in 2010, and graduated summa cum laude in 2014.

=== Spinal muscular atrophy ===
At the age of 14 months, Burcaw was diagnosed with spinal muscular atrophy type 2, a disorder that causes progressive muscle degeneration. It is considered one of 43 types of muscular dystrophy. He has never walked. He has been in a wheelchair since he was two years old, and weighed 54 pounds (24 kg) at the age of 19. He didn't have the strength to hold a tissue to his nose or balance his head on his neck. But he can type, and can control a motorized wheelchair which he had since the age of three. He used his wheelchair as a prop for games (he was a hockey goalie with a stick taped to his chair) to tow his brother on a skateboard or on a sled in the snow, and once to raise 10-year-old Andrew from a pulley to try to dunk a basketball into a hoop.

Shane Burcaw received donations as a representative of the Muscular Dystrophy Association since the age of six. He and his family raised $40,000 for the group from 1999 to 2006, through the MDA's "Ride for Life" motorcycle event. By 2007, the group called Jon Burcaw "Smilin' Jon", and his motorcycle had a custom sidecar for Shane. In 2011, Jon Burcaw published a children's novel, The Sidecar Kings (ISBN 978-1432771911, Outskirts Press), based on the ride and MDA summer camp, with a portion of the proceeds going to MDA research. By 2022, Jon had raised over $250,000 for the group.

As Burcaw entered his 20s, his disease made it likely he would never reach the age of 30; every flu or fever risked overpowering his lungs and killing him. In December 2016, the US Food and Drug Administration approved Nusinersen, marketed as Spinraza, the first drug for treatment of spinal muscular atrophy. In August 2017, Burcaw began having Spinraza injected into his spinal cord every four months, and saw noticeable improvement in his condition; a year later he could lift a cup to his lips for the first time in years, and by 2019 he was told he had a normal life expectancy.

=== Laughing at My Nightmare ===
After completing his first year of college, in June 2011 Burcaw started a blog, "Laughing at My Nightmare" (LAMN), in which he discussed his life and condition with blunt honesty and humor. He said that making people laugh was probably his favorite thing in life. By January 2012, the blog had 36,000 readers, including rapper Sirah and Anthony Green, lead singer of Burcaw's favorite band Circa Survive. In 2012 and 2013 "Laughing at My Nightmare" won "best humor blog" from the The Morning Call, a local Lehigh Valley newspaper.

By 2013, LAMN had 250,000 readers, and Macmillan Publishers agreed to publish a book based on his life with excerpts from the blog. In April 2013, his story was featured on an episode of My Last Days, actor Rainn Wilson's YouTube series about people living with terminal illness. In September 2013, the "Laughing At My Nightmare" segment of The Peak, a WFMZ-TV local television program, won the Mid-Atlantic Emmy Award in the Human Interest Program Feature category; Burcaw was credited as producer.

In May 2013, Burcaw took his first road trip without his parents, a week driving between Bethlehem and Orlando, Florida. The trip was his first public speaking tour, with four meet-ups with followers of his blog in Florida, Georgia, North Carolina, and Washington, D. C., and it was filmed by an independent film crew making a documentary about the tour, led by actor Justin Baldoni. Burcaw was accompanied by his brother, and two friends: Mark Andrew Male, operations director of LAMN, Inc., and 16 year old Shannon O'Connor, from Florida, who began following Burcaw's blog a year after her mother, a single parent, died, then became a volunteer for LAMN, including serving as creative director for the Emmy-winning video. In Florida, he spoke at Walt Disney World. In 2014, a Men's Health magazine video on Burcaw called O'Connor his girlfriend; in it, Burcaw said that she never really saw his wheelchair and made him feel like he didn't have a disease.

From April 2014 through November 2016, Burcaw wrote an irregular column for The Morning Call, also called "Laughing at My Nightmare". In February 2015, Burcaw wrote an article for The Morning Call titled "Strangers assume my girlfriend is my nurse", about how when he and Anna, his able-bodied girlfriend of two months, went out in public, they would regularly meet the assumption that she was Burcaw's carer. He wrote that in truth, his girlfriend did help him dress and feed himself, and yet that made their relationship only more intimate. The article was reprinted in The Chicago Tribune, and written about in The Washington Post and the British newspapers The Daily Telegraph and The Independent. It became the title and basis of his third book, Strangers Assume My Girlfriend Is My Nurse, in 2019.

In March 2015, Burcaw wrote and executive produced a short video called A Will to Survive, about a day he was hospitalized at the age of 17 and thought he was about to die. It won the 2015 Mid-Atlantic Emmy award for Human Interest Program Feature/Segment.

=== LAMN, Inc. ===
In January 2012, Shane Burcaw and his cousin Sarah Burcaw founded LAMN, Inc., a non-profit organization to raise funds for muscular dystrophy. In 2013, LAMN, Inc., donated $3500 to the local Muscular Dystrophy Association. In 2014, it donated $14,000 to the MDA, and announced a program called No More Nightmares to directly provide Lehigh Valley muscular disorder sufferers with ramps, vehicles, and medical equipment. In November 2014, Shane and Sarah Burcaw decided to make LAMN their full time job. In June 2022, they received a join Haupert Humanitarian Award from Moravian University for their work with LAMN.

== Hannah Aylward ==
Hannah Aylward was born in 1995, and grew up in Connecticut. She swam competitively for the Cheshire YMCA swim team at the age of 10. She attended Hopkins School, a private high school in New Haven, then was homeschooled for the 11th and 12th grades.

Aylward took a gap year after high school in which she traveled Europe, then enrolled in Carleton College in 2015. She majored in Sociology and Anthropology (SOAN). In Carleton, she was a member of the women's swimming and diving team and made the college all time top twenty list with a 2016 performance in 100 m breaststroke. She graduated Carleton in 2019.

== Squirmy and Grubs ==
In 2016, Hannah Aylward took a break from studying for her final exams for her Carleton Sociology degree by watching a YouTube video, the 2013 My Last Days documentary about Shane Burcaw. She remembers being captivated by his positive attitude, his dry sense of humor, which she shared, and even thought he was attractive. She clicked through to his LAMN blog, and read for hours, then sent him an email, ending with "PS. I think you’re cute". He wrote back with his phone number the next day. They sent emails, text messages, video calls, and said they loved each other within two weeks. Two months later, in May 2016, she flew out to Pennsylvania to meet him and his family. She learned how to care for him, lifting him from his chair and even helping him on the toilet, and visited every six weeks for the next two years, until he moved to Minnesota to live with her. She would get him up every morning and set him up with his laptop and a snack while she swam or attended classes. She wrote her Comps or Integrated Comprehensive Exercise, her Carleton capstone project in 2018-2019, on "When I’m in public, I never forget that I’m in a wheelchair: Interpersonal Experiences of People With Physical Disabilities", motivated by her experiences with her disabled boyfriend; she says it fit perfectly into her SOAN major, which was about studying groups of people, especially marginalized ones. Burcaw wrote that they take care of each other; even though he can't wash dishes or fold laundry, he manages the couple's finances and calendars, schedules their appointments and answers emails.

The physical difficulties didn't bother Hannah and Shane as much as the public confusion and negative comments about their inter-abled relationship, so in June 2018, they started a YouTube channel and vlog to entertain and educate others about their life together. They named it "Squirmy and Grubs" after their nicknames for each other: Aylward was Squirmy after the way she turned in bed while sleeping, and Burcaw was Grubs because of his sweaty hands. The blurb at the top of their channel's page read "Once upon a time, a boy with no muscles fell madly in love with a beautiful girl who had plenty of muscle to spare." In 2019, it was featured on the Today show and Good Morning America. It had 127,000 followers in January 2019, over 694,000 in September 2020, and 1.85 million in 2026. In 2025 they were one of the top three most popular YouTubers of Minnesota.

On September 4, 2020, Hannah and Shane married in a small backyard ceremony in Minneapolis. His cousin Sarah officiated over Zoom. That month, the Burcaws said they definitely wanted to have children but were not ready just then. In 2023, the success of their YouTube channel allowed the Burcaws to buy a house in Los Angeles, and split their time between there and Minneapolis. They also revealed they were attempting to conceive with in vitro fertilisation, after "trying the old-fashioned route for two years". They had learned that Shane didn't have much sperm, though they didn't know if that was due to his SMA medication or merely that he sat all the time. Their attempts that year failed, and the Burcaws stopped IVF attempts for three years, until January 2026. In September 2026, the Burcaws announced their successful pregnancy. The baby was expected in January 2027; they knew the sex, but had not decided on a name yet, and Shane joked that it might be born without one.

=== Trolls ===
Being open about their relationship on the Internet also opened the couple to trolling. Anonymous Internet commentators have attacked the couple and their relationship, calling them "abnormal and frankly disgusting", and questioning Hannah's motivations for wanting to be with Shane. When the couple married in 2020, their announcement received a flood of negative comments on social media, such as asking whether Shane was rich, and whether Hannah would have another partner for sex, that Hannah reposted overlaid on a photo of their wedding. Hannah said that while a few years ago words like that would have been painful, with time, they learned to use them as encouragement to continue telling their story.

Hannah wrote that for a while, she believed that their marriage would stop people doubting their relationship, but then realized it would not. In 2024, the Burcaws joined a social media trend by joking that Shane did not qualify for the olympic diving team with a video of Hannah lowering him into a pool. The video received 20 million views, but the comments included calling Shane a vegetable, questioning their relationship, and saying that one day Hannah would not pull him back up. In 2026, similar attacks on one of their Instagram posts made Hannah Burcaw respond that desperate comments like those were one of the reasons Shane had a wife and commentators didn't. Thousands applauded her response. Even when the couple announced their pregnancy in September 2026, the trolls did not give up, with one wishing they would die soon.

=== Advocacy ===
The Burcaws use their relative prominence to advocate on behalf of disabled people and interabled couples. In 2020, Shane posted about how his condition made the COVID-19 pandemic quite likely to kill him, making it imperative that able bodied people observe safety protocols for the saje of the vulnerable. During Disability Pride Month, he wrote an essay for The Today Show about the Americans with Disabilities Act and what needed to be improved. In 2022, the Burcaws appeared on and served as disability consultants for an episode of the Ordinary Joe television series. In 2023, the Burcaws were able to change a West Hollywood rule that prevented reversing into a parking spot, necessary for their wheelchair ramp.

They say they get asked why they don't talk more about politics and disability rights, and answer because then no one would watch. They say, "We're able to reach people and send a positive message because we make fun videos ... not because we're shouting about legislation every day."

== Books ==
Strangers Assume My Girlfriend Is My Nurse, 2021, with Hannah and Shane Burcaw

Shane Burcaw's first book was published October 14, 2014, and titled Laughing at My Nightmare like his blog and non-profit organization (ISBN 978-1-62672-007-7, Roaring Book Press). It was targeted at young adults and described his life, growing up with spinal muscular atrophy, including how he uses the toilet or interacts with his girlfriend. Its many favorable reviews commented on the book's uncompromising frankness interleaved with humor and occasional profanity. It was a finalist for the 2015 YALSA Award for Excellence in Nonfiction.

In November 2017, he followed up on the biography with a children's picture book, Not So Different: What You Really Want To Ask About Having a Disability (ISBN 9781626727717, Roaring Brook Press, illustrated with photographs by Matt Carr). It answered questions children asked him about his life, his friends, family, and how he got around in his wheelchair. It won a 2018 Robert F. Sibert Informational Book Medal Honor.

In 2019, Shane Burcaw published Strangers Assume My Girlfriend Is My Nurse, a collection of 23 essays targeted at teens and young adults (April 30, 2019, ISBN 978-1-62672-770-0, Roaring Brook Press). On its cover, Hannah, wearing a nurse's cap, is lifting Shane out of his wheelchair and holding him like a baby. Reviews called the frank stories insightful, hilarious, and cringe-worthy.

Interabled: True Stories About Love and Disability from Squirmy & Grubs and Other Interabled Couples was credited to Shane and Hannah Burcaw (Roaring Brook Press, January 14, 2025, ISBN 9781250620712). In it, they recount the stories of 22 couples, diverse in age, sexuality, race, and gender, as well as disability, and intersperse them with stories from their own relationship. The Burcaws say they posted a request for submissions from interabled couples on their YouTube channel, and got over 600 submissions in a day. They collaborated on the book, writing some chapters separately and others together, with Shane contributing his experience of writing the first three books, and Hannah contributing her drive to overcome his procrastination.
