= Elizabeth Rusch =

American children's author and magazine writer

- Born: October 14, 1966 (age 59); New York City, New York, U.S.
- Education: Duke University
- Writing career
- Genre: Non-fiction

Elizabeth Rusch is an American children's author and magazine writer. Rusch has written about numerous nonfiction subjects ranging from volcanology to the life of Maria Anna Mozart. Rusch has also written several works of fiction including the picture book A Day with No Crayons and the graphic novel Muddy Max: The Mystery of Marsh Creek. Her books have won numerous awards and accolades including: The Oregon Spirit Award, Oregon Book Award, NSTA Outstanding Science Tradebook, Bank Street College of Education Best Book of the Year, Kirkus Best Book of the Year, Gelett Burgess Award for Biography, AAAS Best Book of the Year, School Library Journal Best Book of Year, New York Public Library Best Book of the Year, Best STEM Trade Book (NSTA-CBC), Texas Topaz Nonfiction Gem. She attended Duke University. Rusch has written more than 15 books for children and more than one hundred articles for young people and adults.

== Controversy ==
Rusch's picture book Mario and the Hole in the Sky: How a Chemist Saved Our Planet drew national attention when all copies were pulped shortly before its release. The book, a biography of Mario Molina, the Nobel-Prize winning chemist who helped solve the ozone layer crisis of the 1980s, took Rusch years to write. It was due to be released in 2018, but when the book’s illustrator, David Diaz, was accused of sexual harassment, the release was postponed and the finished copies of the book were destroyed.

“It’s really sad that people won’t be able to read this version,” said Ms. Rusch, who posted a comment on Facebook strongly supporting the women who came forward. “But it’s the right thing to do for the book, and the industry, as painful as it was.”

The publisher, Charlesbridge, announced plans to hire a new illustrator and release the book at a later date, and it was published in 2019 with illustrations by Teresa Martinez. It won the 2020 Golden Kite Award for best work of nonfiction for younger readers as well as the 2020 Green Book Award for children's picture book.

== Books for children ==
Elizabeth Rusch's books for young people include:

- Generation Fix: Young Ideas for a Better World, 2002
- Girls' Tennis: Conquering the Court, 2007
- A Day With No Crayons, 2007
- The Planet Hunter: The Story Behind What Happened to Pluto, 2007
- Will It Blow? Become a Volcano Detective at Mount St. Helens, 2007
- Generation Fix: Young Ideas for a Better World, 2008
- The Mighty Mars Rovers: The Incredible Adventures of Spirit and Opportunity, 2012 (nominated in 2013 for YALSA Award for Excellence in Nonfiction)
- Volcano Rising, 2013
- Electrical Wizard: How Nikola Tesla Lit Up the World, 2013
- Eruption! Volcanoes and the Science of Saving Lives, 2013
- The Next Wave: The Quest to Harness the Power of the Oceans, 2014
- Impact! Asteroids and the Science of Saving the World, 2017
- Ready, Set . . . Baby!, 2017
- The Music of Life: Bartolomeo Cristofori & the Invention of the Piano, 2017
- Avalanche Dog Heroes: Piper and Friends Learn to Search the Snow, 2018
