= Sue Macy =

American writer (born 1954)

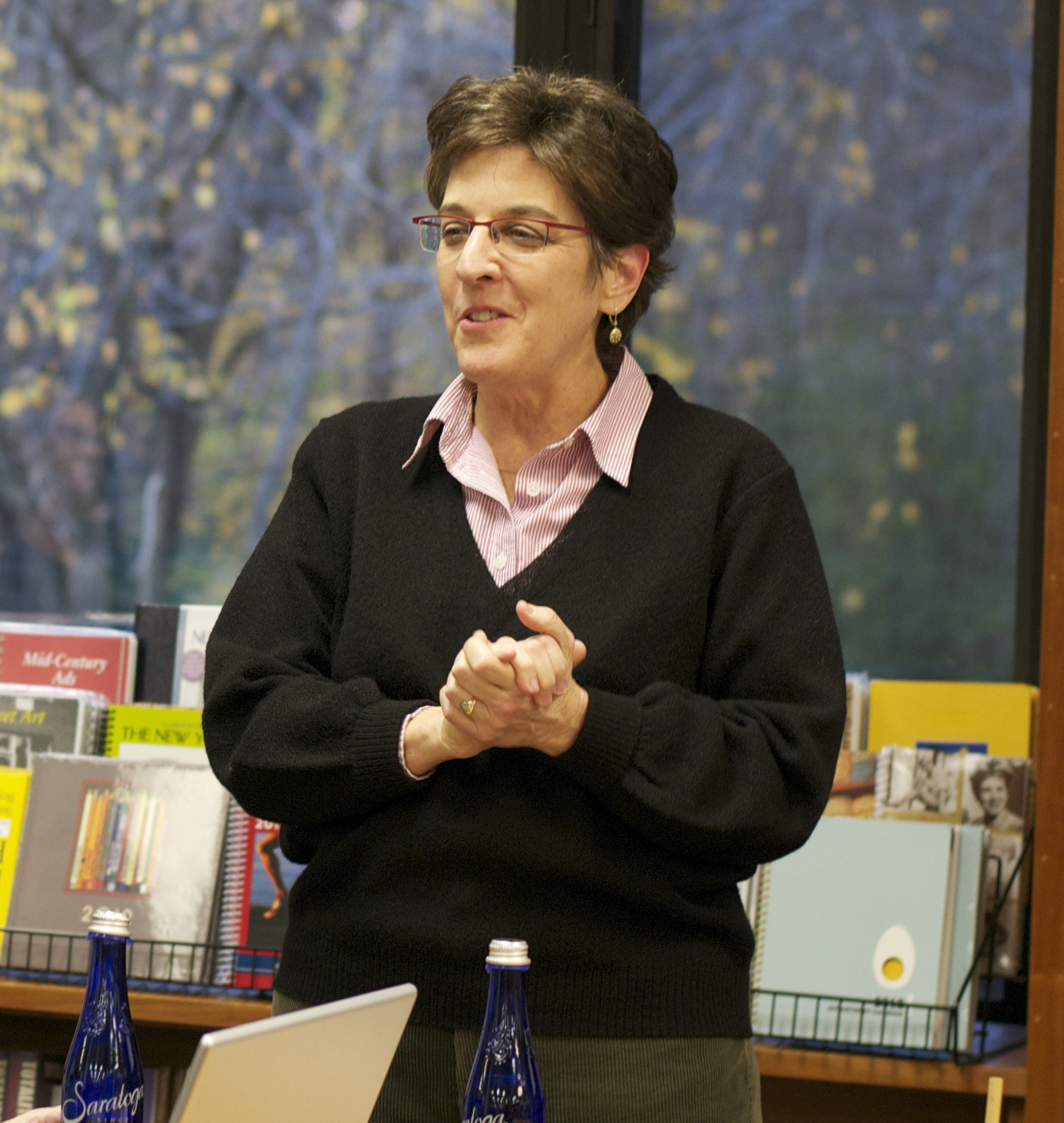
- Born: May 13, 1954 (age 72); New York City, U.S.
- Education: Princeton University
- Occupation: Author
- Writing career
- Genres: Young adult, children's non-fiction
- Website: suemacy.com

Susan Beth Macy (born May 13, 1954) is an American author. She writes young adult nonfiction, focusing mainly on women's history and sports. Her 2019 book, The Book Rescuer, won the American Library's Association's 2020 Sydney Taylor Book Award.

== Early life and education ==
Macy was born in New York City in 1954 and raised in Clifton, New Jersey. Macy is Jewish. Her father, Morris Macy, was a certified public accountant and her mother, Ruth Macy (née Narotsky), taught high school business classes until becoming a homemaker. In her youth, Macy's career interests leaned toward law, but after she won a scholarship in 1971 through her local newspaper to Northwestern University’s summer high school journalism institute her interests began to broaden to writing and journalism. The Northwestern University Journalism Institute enabled Macy to serve as a summer intern to the North Jersey Herald News for the next three years.

Macy attended Clifton High School and Princeton University.

== Career ==
Macy's book, Wheels of Change: How Women Rode the Bicycle to Freedom (With a Few Flat Tires Along the Way), was published by the National Geographic Society and explores the impact of the bicycle on women's liberation in the 1890s. It was a finalist for the Young Adult Library Services Association's YALSA Award for Excellence in Nonfiction for Young Adults in 2012. Maria Popova wrote on Brain Pickings that Wheels of Change is "a remarkable National Geographic tome that tells the riveting story of how the two-wheel wonder pedaled forward the emancipation of women in late-nineteenth-century America and radically redefined the normative conventions of femininity."

Macy's 2019 picture book, The Book Rescuer, is the story of Yiddish Book Center's founder Aaron Lansky. The Book Rescuer was a Parents' Choice Award winner and has received starred reviews from Publishers Weekly, Kirkus Reviews, and The New York Times. The Book Rescuer was announced as the winner of the 2020 Sydney Taylor Book Award in the Picture Book category at the American Library Association’s Youth Media Awards on January 27, 2020.

In February 2020, the National Geographic Society released Macy's exploration of female athletes in the 1920s, entitled Breaking Through: How Female Athletes Shattered Stereotypes in the Roaring Twenties.

== Books ==
- A Whole New Ball Game: The Story of the All-American Girls Professional Baseball League (Henry Holt and Company, 1993)
- Winning Ways: A Photohistory of American Women in Sports (Henry Holt and Company, 1996)
- Play Like a Girl: A Celebration of Women In Sports (Henry Holt and Company, 1999) — edited with Jane Gottesman
- Girls Got Game: Sports Stories and Poems (Henry Holt and Company, 2001)
- Bull's Eye: A Photobiography of Annie Oakley (National Geographic Society, 2001)
- Swifter, Higher, Stronger: A Photographic History of the Summer Olympics (National Geographic Society, 2004)
- Freeze Frame: A Photographic History of the Winter Olympics (National Geographic Society, 2006)
- Bylines: A Photobiography of Nellie Bly (National Geographic Society, 2009)
- Wheels of Change: How Women Rode the Bicycle to Freedom (With a Few Flat Tires Along the Way) (National Geographic Society, 2011)
- Basketball Belles: How Two Teams and One Scrappy Player Put Women’s Hoops on the Map (Holiday House, 2011) — illustrated by Matt Collins
- Roller Derby Rivals (Holiday House, 2011) — illustrated by Matt Collins
- Sally Ride: Life on a Mission (Aladdin/Simon & Schuster, 2014)
- Miss Mary Reporting: The True Story of Sportswriter Mary Garber (Paula Wiseman Books/Simon & Schuster, 2016) — illustrated by C.F. Payne
- Trudy's Big Swim: How Gertrude Ederle Swam the English Channel and Took the World By Storm (Holiday House, 2017) — illustrated by Matt Collins
- Motor Girls: How Women Took the Wheel and Drove Boldly Into the Twentieth Century (National Geographic Society, 2017)
- The Book Rescuer: How a Mensch from Massachusetts Saved Yiddish Literature for Generations to Come (Paula Wiseman Books/Simon & Schuster, 2019) — illustrated by Stacy Innerst
- Breaking Through: How Female Athletes Shattered Stereotypes in the Roaring Twenties (National Geographic Society, released in February 2020)
