= Deborah Heiligman =

American author of children's and young adult literature

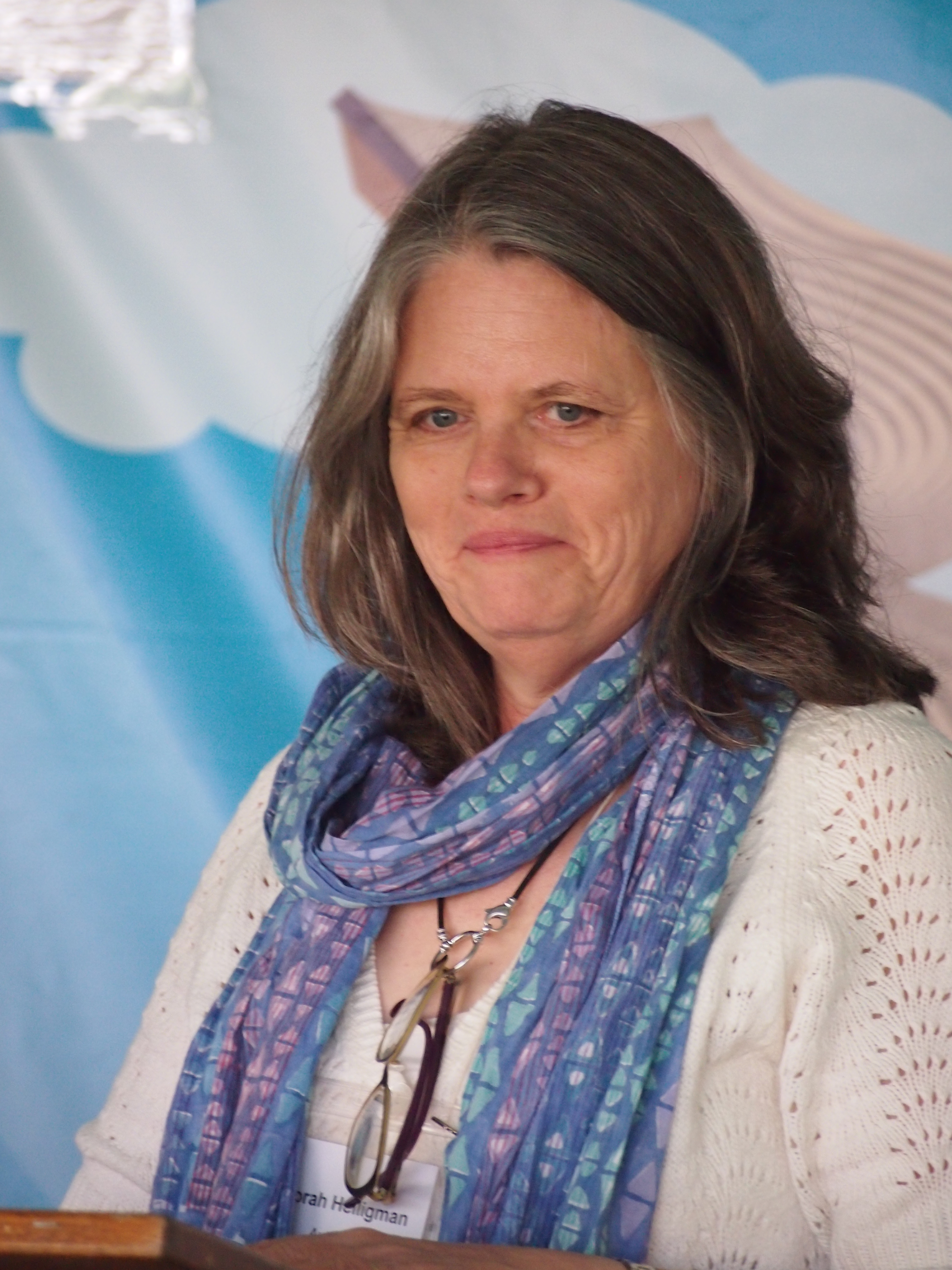
Deborah Heiligman

Deborah Heiligman is an American author of books for children and teens. Her work ranges from picture books to young adult novels and includes both fiction and nonfiction.

== Early life and education ==
Heiligman grew up in Allentown, Pennsylvania. She attended William Allen High School (from which she later received a Distinguished Alumni Award), and graduated from Brown University.

== Career ==
Heiligman started her writing career working for Scholastic News Explorer, the 4th grade classroom magazine. After the birth of her two children she started to work as a freelance writer. In addition to her books for children and teens, she has written articles for major publications including The New York Times and The Philadelphia Inquirer and for numerous magazines including Ladies' Home Journal, Sesame Street Parents Guide and Parents Magazine.

== Awards ==
Charles and Emma: The Darwins' Leap of Faith was a Michael L. Printz Award Honor book and winner of the YALSA Award for Excellence in Nonfiction for Young Adults. It was also a National Book Award finalist and a finalist for the Los Angeles Times Book Prize. 'Intentions' was the winner of the Sydney Taylor Book Award for Teen readers. She received 2021 Mathical Honors for The Boy Who Loved Math.

== Family ==
In 2014 Heiligman lives in New York City with her husband, Pulitzer Prize winning author Jonathan Weiner, who is a professor at Columbia University School of Journalism. They have two grown sons.

== Books ==
- Into the Night (1990)
- Barbara McClintock: Alone in Her Field (1994)
- Mark Leakey: In Search of Human Beginnings (1995)
- On the Move (1996)
- From Caterpillar to Butterfly (1996)
- Too Perfect (EEEK! Stories to Make You Shriek) (1996)
- The Kid's Guide to Research (1998)
- The Story of the Titanic (1998)
- Mike Swan, Sink or Swim (1998)
- The Mysterious Ocean Highway: Benjamin Franklin and the Gulf Stream (2000)
- Earthquakes (2002)
- Babies: All You Need to Know (2002)
- Honeybees (2002)
- High Hopes: A Photobiography of John F. Kennedy (2003)
- Fun Dog, Sun Dog (2005)
- Holidays Around the World series:
  - Celebrate Christmas with Carols, Presents and Peace (2007)
  - Celebrate Easter with Colored Eggs, Flowers, and Prayer (2007)
  - Celebrate Halloween with Pumpkins, Costumes and Candy (2007)
  - Celebrate Hanukkah with Light, Latkes, and Dreidels (2006)
  - Celebrate Independence Day with Parades, Picnics and Fireworks (2007)
  - Celebrate Passover with Matzah, Maror, and Memories (2007)
  - Celebrate Ramadan and Eid Al-Fitr with Praying, Fasting and Charity (2006)
  - Celebrate Rosh Hashanah and Yom Kippur with Honey, Prayers and the Shofar (2007)
  - Celebrate Thanksgiving with Turkey, Family and Counting Blessings (2006)
- Cool Dog, School Dog (2009)
- Charles and Emma: The Darwins’ Leap of Faith (2009)
- Intentions (2012)
- Snow Dog, Go Dog (2013)
- The Boy Who Loved Math: The Improbable Life of Paul Erdös (2013)
- Vincent and Theo: The Van Gogh Brothers (2017)
- Torpedoed: The True Story of the World War II Sinking of "The Children's Ship" (2019)
