= Under a Red Sky =

2010 memoir by Haya Leah Molnar

Under a Red Sky: Memoir of a Childhood in Communist Romania
- Author: Haya Leah Molnar
- Language: English
- Published: 2010
- Publisher: Farrar, Straus and Giroux
- ISBN: 9780374318406

Under a Red Sky is a 2010 memoir by Haya Leah Molnar about the life of a young Jewish girl living in Communist Romania. The full name of the book is Under a Red Sky: Memoir of a Childhood in Communist Romania.

== Reception ==
Under a Red Sky received reviews from sources including the Jewish Book Council, Publishers Weekly, and Kirkus Reviews. The reviews were generally positive.

The book won the Sydney Taylor Book Award in 2011 as a Notable Book for Teen Readers, the National Jewish Book Award for Children's and young adults' literature in 2010, and was Bank Street's Best Children's Book of the Year in 2011.
