= The Notorious Benedict Arnold =

2010 children's non-fiction book

The Notorious Benedict Arnold: A True Story of Adventure, Heroism & Treachery
- Author: Steve Sheinkin
- Cover artist: Larry Rostant
- Language: English
- Publisher: Roaring Brook Press, Square Fish
- Publication date: November 9, 2010
- Publication place: United States
- Pages: 377
- ISBN: 978-1-250-02460-2

The Notorious Benedict Arnold: A True Story of Adventure, Heroism & Treachery is a non-fiction biographical adolescent book about Benedict Arnold. Written in 2010 by Steve Sheinkin, the book encompasses the whole life of Benedict Arnold, from his freezing cold date of birth in Connecticut to his death in England in 1801. It has won the Boston Globe-Horn Book Award for Nonfiction, the Margaret Edwards Award, and the YALSA-ALA Award for Excellence in Young Adult Nonfiction.

== Background ==
Sheinkin writes in the book that he was long fascinated by Arnold. Over the years, he compiled an "absurdly large collection" of books, plays, and anything to do with Arnold. He even followed Arnold's route to Canada that he took in 1775.

== Story line ==
The book begins with the hanging of John André, before backtracking and telling the story of Arnold's life. The book also occasionally tells the reader what's happening to John André. Eventually, the two stories merge into one, when André and Arnold begin working together to hand West Point over to the British.

== Reception ==
Reviews were almost entirely positive, with three of them starred. School Library Journal's starred review calls it an "engaging story of revolution and treason" in which "Sheinkin keeps readers wanting to know what will happen next." Booklist as well was very positive, stating that "history junkies are in for a treat when they pick up this lively, highly readable biography," and called the book "a worthy addition to all libraries". Kirkus Reviews (starred review) says that Sheinkin wrote a "brilliant, fast-paced biography that reads like an adventure novel," and that "the author's obvious mastery of his material, lively prose and abundant use of eyewitness accounts make this one of the most exciting biographies young readers will find." A starred review from the Horn Book Magazine describes how the book simplifies complex ideas for its readers, saying that "several complex political, social, and military themes emerge."

== Awards ==
- Boston Globe–Horn Book Award for non-fiction
- YALSA-ALA Award for Excellence in Young Adult Nonfiction
- School Library Journal Best Children's Book
- Margaret Edwards Award
