= Steve Jenkins (author) =

American children's writer and illustrator (1952–2021)

Stephen Wilkins Jenkins
- Born: March 31, 1952; Hickory, North Carolina
- Died: December 26, 2021 (aged 69); Boulder, Colorado
- Education: North Carolina State University
- Spouse: Robin Page

Stephen Wilkins Jenkins (March 31, 1952 – December 26, 2021) was an American children's book author. He illustrated, wrote, and art-directed over 80 books.

== Biography ==
Jenkins was born March 31, 1952, in Hickory, North Carolina, to Alvin and Margaret Jenkins. His father, who was a physics professor and astronomer, did research and taught at various universities, so he spent much of his childhood moving from one city to the next.

He received a bachelor's and master's from the School of Design at North Carolina State University (NCSU). During his time at NCSU, he met his wife, Robin Page. After graduating, the couple moved to New York City, and in 1982, founded their own graphic design firm, Jenkins & Page. In 1994, they moved to Boulder, Colorado.

Jenkins's debut book, Duck’s Breath and Mouse Pie, was published in 1994.

Jenkins died on December 26, 2021, of a splenic artery aneurysm, in Boulder, Colorado.

== Awards and honors ==
Forty-four of Jenkins's books are Junior Library Guild selections.

The Bulletin of the Center for Children's Books included the following books in their lists of the best books of the year: How to Swallow a Pig (2015) and Animals by the Numbers (2016). The Horn Book Magazine has included the following books in their lists of the best children's nonfiction books of the year: The Top of the World (1999), Life on Earth (2002), Invisible Allies (2005), and The Animal Book (2013).

Awards for Jenkins's books
Year	Title	Award	Result	Ref.
1998	Animal Dads (as illus.)	NCTE Orbis Pictus Award	Recommended	
1999	Hottest, Coldest, Highest, Deepest	NCTE Orbis Pictus Award	Honor	
2000	The Top of the World	NCTE Orbis Pictus Award	Honor	
2002	Animals In Flight	NCTE Orbis Pictus Award	Recommended	
2004	What Do You Do with a Tail Like This? (as illus.)	Caldecott Medal	Honor	
2005	Actual Size	NCTE Orbis Pictus Award	Honor	
2006	Top of the World: Climbing Mount Everest	Quick Picks for Reluctant Young Adult Readers	Selection	
2007	Animal Poems (as illus.)	Cybils Award for Poetry	Finalist	
2007	Living Color	Cybils Award for Nonfiction Picture Books	Finalist	
2008	Living Color. Animals: tomato frog, scarlet percher dragonfly, deep-sea jellyfish, scarlet ibis, fire shrimp, Giant Vietnamese centipede, stonefish, hooded seal, flame scallop, ʻIʻiwi, white uakari, Red salamander, harvest mite, shield bug, crow, hyacinth macaw, poison dart frog, cleaner wrasse, american robin, blue morpho butterfly, Cobalt blue tarantula, Oedipoda caerulescens, Portuguese man-of-war, blue bird of paradise, blue-tongued skink, Plestiodon elegans, crab spider, Madagascan moon moth, yellow mongoose, trumpetfish, great hornbill, eyelash viper, yellow crazy ant, yellow shore crab, ladybird beetle, American goldfinch, common cuttlefish, leaf insect, green moray eel, three-toed sloth, lesser green broadbill, green anole green tiger beetle, luna moth (caterpillar), giant green anemone, leafy sea dragon, kelp isopod, African chameleon, Garibaldi	NCTE Orbis Pictus Award	Recommended	
2008	Vulture View (as illus.)	ALSC Notable Children's Books	Selection	
2008	Vulture View (as illus.)	Geisel Award	Honor	
2009	Down, Down, Down- Animals: Portuguese man o' war, albatross, great white shark, flying fish, flying squid, bottlenose dolphin, mackerel, krill, bluefin tuna, sailfish, shearwater, green sea turtle, mola mola, whale shark, manta ray, compass jellyfish, venus girdle, nautilus, oarfish, goblin shark, snipe eel, vampire squid, siphonophore, marine hatchetfish pram bug, pelican eel, deep sea jellyfish, arrow worm, deep-sea shrimp, deepsea lizardfish, hairy angler, stoplight loosejaw, black swallower, fangtooth, sperm whale, giant squid, deep-sea comb jelly, swimming sea cucumber, sea lily, tripod spiderfish, hagfish, vent crab, mussel, giant tube worm, vent octopus, and eelpout.	Cybils Award for Nonfiction Picture Books	Finalist	
2009	Sisters and Brothers - Animals: African elephant, Gould's long-eared bat, nine-banded armadillo, New Mexico whiptail lizard, naked mole rat, termite, grizzly bear, spotted hyena, black widow spider, cheetah, peregrine falcon, wild turkey, beaver, nile crocodile, European shrew, great crested grebe, cichlid, cuckoo catfish, common myna, Asian koel, and giant anteater.	NCTE Orbis Pictus Award	Recommended	
2009	Bones	Cybils Award for Nonfiction Picture Books	Finalist	
2011	How to Clean a Hippopotamus	ALSC Notable Children's Books	Selection	
2012	Billions of Years, Amazing Changes	ALSC Notable Children's Books	Selection	
2012	Billions of Years, Amazing Changes	NCTE Orbis Pictus Award	Recommended	
2013	The Beetle Book	ALSC Notable Children's Books	Selection	
2014	Eat Like a Bear (as illus.)	ALSC Notable Children's Books	Selection	
2015	The Animal Book	Boston Globe–Horn Book Award	Honor	
2015	Mama Built a Little Nest (as illus.)	ALSC Notable Children's Books	Selection	
2016	Woodpecker Wham! (as illus.)	ALSC Notable Children's Books	Selection	
2017	Animals by the Numbers	ALSC Notable Children's Books	Selection	
2017	Animals by the Numbers	NCTE Orbis Pictus Award	Honor	
2017	Eye to Eye - Animals: red-crowned Amazon, stick insect (called jumping stick insect), nudibranch, garden snail, nautilus, Atlantic bay scallop, colossal squid, bullfrog, stalk-eyed fly, blue mountain swallowtail butterfly, green pit viper, jumping spider, brownsnout spookfish, tuatara, halibut, panther chameleon, ghost crab, gharial, housecat, hippopotamus, leopard gecko, tarsier, mantis shrimp Eurasian buzzard	NCTE Orbis Pictus Award	Recommended	

== Selected works ==
=== As author and illustrator ===
- Duck's Breath and Mouse Pie: A Collection of Animal Superstitions (Ticknor & Fields, 1994)
- Animals in Flight
- What Do You Do with a Tail Like This?
- How to Clean a Hippopotamus: A Look at Unusual Animal Partnerships, illustrated by Robin Page (Clarion Books, 2010)

=== As illustrator only ===
- One Nighttime Sea, written by Deborah Lee Rose (Scholastic, 2003)
- Vulture View, illustrated by April Pulley Sayre (Henry Holt & Company, 2007)
- Pug and Other Animal Poems, written by Valerie Worth (Farrar, Straus and Giroux, 2013)
- Squirrels Leap, Squirrels Sleep, written by April Pulley Sayre (Henry Holt & Co., 2016)
