= Gail Jarrow =

American children's book author and teacher

- Born: November 29, 1952 (age 72); Dallas, Texas, United States
- Occupation: Children's book author and teacher
- Education: Duke University (BA); Dartmouth College (MA)
- Notable awards: YALSA Award for Excellence in Nonfiction (2022)
- Spouse: Robert Jarrow (m. 1974)
- Children: 3

Website
- gailjarrow.com

Gail Jarrow (born November 29, 1952, in Dallas) is an American children's book author and teacher.

== Personal life and education ==
Jarrow was born November 29, 1952, in Dallas, Texas. She married Robert Jarrow in May 1974 and has three children: Kyle, Tate, and Heather.

Jarrow received a Bachelor of Arts from Duke University in 1974 and a Master of Arts from Dartmouth College in 1980.

== Awards and honors ==
Eight of Jarrow's books are Junior Library Guild selections: Lincoln’s Flying Spies (2011), Fatal Fever (2015), Bubonic Panic (2016), Spooked! (2019), The Poison Eaters (2019), Blood and Germs (2021), Ambushed! (2022), and American Murderer (2022).

In 2012, Bank Street College of Education included Lincoln’s Flying Spies on their list of the year's best history books for children ages 12–14.

In 2013, Bank Street College of Education included The Amazing Harry Kellar on their list of the year's best biographies for children ages 9–12.

In 2014, School Library Journal included Red Madness on their list of the year's best children's books. The Chicago Public Library included it on their "Best Informational Books for Older Readers of 2014" list. The following year, Bank Street College of Education included it on their list of the year's best science books for children ages 12–14.

In 2015, Booklist and The Bulletin named Fatal Fever one of the best young adult books of the year. The Bank Street College of Education included it on their list of the best STEM books for children ages 12–14, marking it an "Outstanding Title".

In 2016, Kirkus Reviews and the New York Public Library named Bubonic Panic one of the best children's/young adult books of the year. The Chicago Public Library included it on their "Best Informational Books for Older Readers of 2016" list. The following year, Bank Street College of Education included it on their list of the year's best STEM books for children ages 12–14.

In 2018, The Bulletin included Spooked! on their list of the best children's books of the year, and the Chicago Public Library included it on their "Best Informational Books for Older Readers of 2018" list. The following year, the Association for Library Service to Children (ALSC) named it a Notable Children's Book, and Booklist included it on their 2019 Editor's Choice: Books for Youth list. That year, Bank Street College of Education included it on their list of the best history books for children ages 12–14. In 2020, Young Adult Library Services Association (YALSA) included Spooked! on their Quick Picks for Reluctant Young Adult Readers list.

In 2019, The Bulletin and Kirkus Reviews included The Poison Eaters on their lists of the best books of the year. The Chicago Public Library included it on their "Best Informational Books for Older Readers of 2019" list. The following year, ALSC named it a Notable Children's Book, and Bank Street College of Education named it one of the year's best STEM books for children ages 9–12.

In 2020, the Chicago Public Library included Blood and Germs on their annual "Best Informational Books for Older Readers" list.

In 2022, School Library Journal named Ambushed! one of the best children's books of the year.

The same year, the Chicago Public Library included American Murderer on their "Best Informational Books for Older Readers" list. The following year, ALSC named it a Notable Children's Book.

Awards for Jarrow's writing
Year	Title	Award	Result	Ref.
2013	The Amazing Harry Kellar	YALSA Award for Excellence in Nonfiction	Nominee	
2015	Fatal Fever	Cybils Award for Elementary and Middle Grade Nonfiction	Finalist	
2015	Red Madness	YALSA Award for Excellence in Nonfiction	Nominee	
2016	Bubonic Panic	Cybils Award for Middle Grade Nonfiction	Finalist	
2016	Red Madness	YALSA Award for Excellence in Nonfiction	Nominee	
2018	Spooked!	Cybils Award for Junior High Nonfiction	Finalist	
2019	Spooked!	Golden Kite Award	Honor	
2019	Spooked!	Sibert Medal	Honor	
2019	Spooked!	YALSA Award for Excellence in Nonfiction	Nominee	
2019	The Poison Eaters	Cybils Award for Junior High Nonfiction	Finalist	
2020	The Poison Eaters	Orbis Pictus Award	Honor	
2020	The Poison Eaters	YALSA Award for Excellence in Nonfiction	Nominee	
2021	Blood and Germs	Kids Choice Award for Favorite True Story	Finalist	
2021	Blood and Germs	YALSA Award for Excellence in Nonfiction	Nominee	
2022	Ambushed!	YALSA Award for Excellence in Nonfiction	Winner	
2023	American Murderer	YALSA Award for Excellence in Nonfiction	Finalist	

== Publications ==
- Lincoln's Flying Spies: Thaddeus Lowe and the Civil War Balloon Corps (2010)
- The Amazing Harry Kellar: Great American Magician (2012)
- Fatal Fever: Tracking Down Typhoid Mary (2014)
- Red Madness: How a Medical Mystery Changed What We Eat (2014)
- Bubonic Panic: When Plague Invaded America (2016)
- Spooked!: How a Radio Broadcast and The War of the Worlds Sparked the 1938 Invasion of America (2018)
- The Poison Eaters (2019)
- Blood and Germs: The Civil War Battle Against Wounds and Disease (2020)
- Ambushed! The Assassination Plot Against President Garfield (2021)
- American Murderer (2022)
