= A Thousand Sisters =

2019 book by Elizabeth Wein

A Thousand Sisters: The Heroic Airwomen of the Soviet Union in World War II
- Author: Elizabeth Wein
- Language: English
- Genre: Non-fiction
- Publisher: Balzer + Bray
- Publication date: January 22, 2019
- Publication place: United States
- Pages: 384
- ISBN: 978-0-06-245301-3

A Thousand Sisters: The Heroic Airwomen of the Soviet Union in World War II is a 2019 young adult non-fiction book by Elizabeth Wein. It tells the story of the three female Soviet aircrew regiments organized by Marina Raskova in World War II, including the regiment of night bombers nicknamed the Night Witches.

A Thousand Sisters was a finalist for the 2020 YALSA Award for Excellence in Nonfiction.
