= Nicholas Day =

Nicholas Day may refer to:

- Saint Nicholas Day, the feast day of St Nicholas
- Nicholas Day (actor) (born 1947), British actor
- Nick Day (statistician) (born 1939), British statistician and cancer epidemiologist
- Nick Day (film director), British born, US-based filmmaker
- Nicolas Day (born 1955), Australian wildlife illustrator
