= Albert Marrin =

American historian and author (born 1936)

- Born: July 24, 1936 (age 90); New York City, U.S.
- Education: City College of New York; Yeshiva University; Columbia University
- Occupations: Historian; professor; author
- Writing career
- Notable awards: National Humanities Medal (2008)
- Website: albertmarrinauthor.com

Albert Marrin (born July 24, 1936) is an American historian, professor of history and author of more than forty juvenile non-fiction books.

== Life ==
He was born in New York City. He graduated from City College of New York, Yeshiva University and Columbia University. He taught in the public schools New York City. He is chairman of the history department at Yeshiva University.

He lives with his wife in the Bronx, New York.

== Awards ==
- 2008 National Humanities Medal
- 2001 Carter G. Woodson Book Award
- Boston Globe/Horn Book Award
- Dorothy Canfield Fisher Children's Book Award
- James Madison Book Award
- Washington Post-Children's Book Guild Nonfiction Award.

== Work ==
- The Church of England in the first world war, Columbia University., 1968
- Sir Norman Angell, Twayne Publishers, 1979, ISBN 978-0-8057-7725-3
- The airman's war: World War II in the sky, Atheneum, 1982, ISBN 978-0-689-30907-6
- Overlord: D-Day and the invasion of Europe, Atheneum, 1982, ISBN 978-0-689-30931-1
- Victory in the Pacific, Atheneum, 1983
- The sea rovers: pirates, privateers, and buccaneers, Atheneum, 1984, ISBN 978-0-689-31029-4
- War clouds in the West: Indians & cavalrymen, 1860-1890, Atheneum, 1984, ISBN 978-0-689-31066-9
- The secret armies: spies, counterspies, and saboteurs in World War II, Atheneum, 1985, ISBN 978-0-689-31165-9
- 1812, the war nobody won, Atheneum, 1985, ISBN 978-0-689-31075-1
- Aztecs and Spaniards: Cortés and the conquest of Mexico, Atheneum, 1986, ISBN 978-0-689-31176-5
- The Yanks are coming: the United States in the first World War, Atheneum, 1986, ISBN 978-0-689-31209-0
- Hitler, Viking Kestrel, 1987, ISBN 978-0-670-81546-3
- Struggle for a Continent: The French and Indian Wars, 1690-1760, Atheneum, 1987, ISBN 978-0-689-31313-4
- The war for independence: the story of the American Revolution, Atheneum, 1988, ISBN 978-0-689-31390-5
- Inca & Spaniard: Pizarro and the conquest of Peru, Atheneum, 1989, ISBN 978-0-689-31481-0
- Mao Tse-tung and his China, Viking Kestrel, 1989, ISBN 978-0-670-82940-8
- The Spanish–American War, Atheneum, 1991, ISBN 978-0-689-31663-0
- America and Vietnam: the elephant and the tiger, Viking, 1992, ISBN 978-0-670-84063-2
- Stalin Puffin Books, 1993, ISBN 978-0-14-032605-5
- Napoleon and the Napoleonic Wars, Puffin Books, 1993, ISBN 978-0-14-036479-8
- Cowboys, Indians, and gunfighters: the story of the cattle kingdom, Atheneum, 1993, ISBN 978-0-689-31774-3
- Virginia's general: Robert E. Lee and the Civil War, Atheneum, 1994, ISBN 978-0-689-31838-2
- Unconditional surrender: U.S. Grant and the Civil War, Atheneum, 1994, ISBN 978-0-689-31837-5
- The sea king: Sir Francis Drake and his times, Atheneum Books for Young Readers, 1995, ISBN 978-0-689-31887-0
- Plains warrior: Chief Quanah Parker and the Comanches, Atheneum Books for Young Readers, 1996, ISBN 978-0-689-80081-8
- Commander in Chief Abraham Lincoln and the Civil War, Dutton Children's Books, 1997, ISBN 978-0-525-45822-7
- Empires lost and won: the Spanish heritage in the Southwest, Atheneum Books for Young Readers, 1997, ISBN 978-0-689-80414-4
- Terror of the Spanish Main: Sir Henry Morgan and his buccaneers, Dutton Children's Books, 1999, ISBN 978-0-525-45942-2
- Sitting Bull and his world, Dutton Children's Books, 2000, ISBN 978-0-525-45944-6
- George Washington and the founding of a nation, Dutton Children's Books, 2001, ISBN 978-0-525-46481-5
- Dr. Jenner and the speckled monster: the search for the smallpox vaccine, Dutton Children's Books, 2002, ISBN 978-0-525-46922-3
- Secrets from the rocks: dinosaur hunting with Roy Chapman Andrews, Illustrator Albert Marrin, Dutton Children's Books, 2002, ISBN 978-0-525-46743-4
- Old Hickory: Andrew Jackson and the American People, Dutton Children's Books, 2004, ISBN 978-0-525-47293-3
- Oh, Rats!: the story of rats and people, Illustrator C. B. Mordan, Dutton Children's Books, 2006, ISBN 978-0-525-47762-4
- Saving the Buffalo, Scholastic Nonfiction, 2006, ISBN 978-0-439-71854-7
- Commander and Chief: Abraham Lincoln and the Civil War, 2007
- The Great Adventure: Theodore Roosevelt and the Rise of Modern America, Dutton Children's Books, 2008, ISBN 978-0-525-47659-7
- Years of Dust: The Story of the Dust Bowl, 2009
- Flesh and Blood So Cheap: The Triangle Fire and its Legacy, 2011
- Little Monsters: The Creatures That Live on Us and in Us, 2011
- Black Gold: The Story of Oil in Our Lives, 2012
- A Volcano Beneath the Snow: John Brown's War Against Slavery, 2014
- Thomas Paine, Crusader for Liberty: How One Man's Ideas Helped Form a New Nation, 2014
- FDR and the American Crisis, 2015
- Uprooted: The Japanese American Experience During World War II, 2016
- Very, Very, Very Dreadful: The Influenza Pandemic of 1918, 2018
- A Light in the Darkness: Janusz Korczak, His Orphans, and the Holocaust, 2019
- A Time of Fear: America in the Era of Red Scares and Cold War, 2021
