= Kenneth C. Davis =

American historian

Kenneth C. Davis is an American history author, known for his series of books titled "Don't Know Much About".

== Life ==
Born in Mount Vernon, New York, a suburb of New York City, Kenneth attended Concordia College, Bronxville in New York, and Fordham University at Lincoln Center, New York. He lives in New York City with his wife, Joann Davis, a publishing veteran.

Davis's first book, Two-Bit Culture: The Paperbacking of America, offers an overview of the history of paperback books, although some publishers, such as Walter Zacharius and Irwin Stein's Lancer Books, were given little coverage. However, in the New Yorker, Louis Menand cited Two-Bit Culture as the "indispensable history of the paperback book."

Davis has lectured at the Smithsonian Museum and the American Museum of Natural History, and been a contributor to The New York Times, Newsday and other publications, including Social Education, the journal of the National Council for the Social Studies (NCSS).

== Don't Know Much About History ==
Published by Crown in 1990, Davis's second book, Don't Know Much About History, spent 35 consecutive weeks on The New York Times bestseller list and sold nearly 1.5 million copies. This unexpected success launched the Don't Know Much About... series. The standardized format is a chronological coverage of a subject with each chapter divided into boldface subheads of questions, such as, "Did Pocahontas really save John Smith's life?" Davis then answers the questions with basic facts delivered in short essays which have a straightforward approach beginning with light humor and anachronistic comparisons. For example: "Even the astronauts who flew to the moon had a pretty good idea of what to expect; Columbus was sailing, as Star Trek puts it, 'where no man has gone before'." Quotes from historical figures often follow the essays.

The titles were initially inspired by Sam Cooke's song "Wonderful World", with the lyrics, "Don't know much about history" or "geography," etc. The series has generally received favorable reviews. One mixed review criticized Davis for "treat[ing] his subject matter as a vehicle for his own editorials".

== America's Hidden History ==
Davis's book, America's Hidden History: Untold Tales of the First Pilgrims, Fighting Women, and Forgotten Founders Who Shaped a Nation (2008), has a more serious tone than the earlier books, is more expansive, and focuses not only on well-known names but also on forgotten figures such as Hannah Duston.

== Books for Young Adults ==
In 2016, Davis published In the Shadow of Liberty: The Hidden History of Slavery, Four Presidents, and Five Black Lives which examined the lives of five ensalved people and the former presidents who owned them. The book received "Starred Reviews" from Publishers Weekly, Booklist, and School Library Journal. In 2017, it named a "YALSA Finalist for Excellence in Young Adult Nonfiction" by the Young Adult Library Services Association (YALSA).

In 2018, Davis published More Deadly Than War: The Hidden History of the Spanish Flu and the First World War. It is an accounf of the deadly worldwide influenza pandemic of 1918 and its connection to the First World War.

== Great Short Books and The World in Books ==
Davis's most recent works are guides to reading. The first of these, Great Short Books: A Year of Reading--Briefly, offers a curated guide to 58 works of short fiction, meant to be read in a week or less, featuring plot summaries and biographies of the authors. The New York Times Book Review called it "an exciting guide to all that the world of fiction has to offer in 58 short novels --from 'The Great Gatsby' and 'The Lord of the Flies' to the contemporary fiction of Colson Whitehead and Leila Slimani..."

In 2024, he published The World in Books: A Year of Reading--Wisely, a guide to 52 works of short nonfiction, which Kirkus Reviews called "A wealth of succinct, entertaining advice."

== Books (external link) ==
- Two-Bit Culture: The Paperbacking of America (Houghton Mifflin, 1984)
- Don't Know Much About History (1990) (2003 expanded)
- Don't Know Much About Geography (1992)
- Don't Know Much About the Bible (1999)
- Don't Know Much About the Civil War (1999)
- Don't Know Much About Space (2001)
- Don't Know Much About the Planet Earth (2001)
- Don't Know Much About the Presidents (2001)
- Don't Know Much About the Kings and Queens of England (2002)
- Don't Know Much About the Universe (2002)
- Don't Know Much About the Pilgrims (2002)
- Don't Know Much About Sitting Bull (2002)
- Don't Know Much About the Pioneers (2003)
- Don't Know Much About American History (2003)
- Don't Know Much About George Washington (2003)
- Don't Know Much About the 50 States (2004)
- Don't Know Much About the Solar System (2004)
- Don't Know Much About Dinosaurs (2004)
- Don't Know Much About Thomas Jefferson (2005)
- Don't Know Much About Abraham Lincoln (2005)
- Don't Know Much About World Myths (2005)
- Don't Know Much About Mummies (2005)
- Qué sé yo de historia (2005)
- Don't Know Much About Martin Luther King Jr. (2002)
- Don't Know Much About Rosa Parks (2005) ISBN 0060288191
- Don't Know Much About Mythology (2005) ISBN 006019460X
- Don't Know Much About Anything (2007) ISBN 9780061251467
- America's Hidden History: Untold Tales of the First Pilgrims, Fighting Women, and Forgotten Founders Who Shaped a Nation (2008) ISBN 9780061118180
- A Nation Rising: Untold Tales of Flawed Founders, Fallen Heroes, and Forgotten Fighters from America's Hidden History (2010) ISBN 9780061118203
- The Hidden History of America at War: Untold Tales from Yorktown to Fallujah (May 2015) ISBN 9781401324100
- In the Shadow of Liberty: The Hidden History of Slavery, Four Presidents, and Five Black Lives (2016) ISBN 1627793119
- More Deadly Than War: The Hidden History of the Spanish Flu and the First World War (2018) ISBN 1250145120
- Strongman: The Rise of Five Dictators and the Fall of Democracy (2020) ISBN 1250205646
- Great Short Books: A Year of Reading--Briefly (2022)
- The World in Books: A Year of Reading -- Wisely (2024)
