= Karen Blumenthal =

American journalist, author, and educator (1959–2020)

- Born: Karen Frances Blumenthal; March 18, 1959 Texas, U.S.
- Died: May 18, 2020 (aged 61)
- Occupation: Journalist; author; educator
- Education: Hillcrest High School; Duke University; Southern Methodist University (MBA)
- Spouse: Scott McCartney

Karen Frances Blumenthal (March 18, 1959 – May 18, 2020) was an American business journalist, published author, and educator.

== Early years ==
Blumenthal was born in Texas and attended Hillcrest High School before enrolling in Duke University. She got an MBA from Southern Methodist University.

== Career ==
Blumenthal was a financial journalist for the Wall Street Journal for 25 years. She previously worked as a bureau chief for the newspaper in Dallas, and as a reporter for the Dallas morning News.

Blumenthal wrote Hillary Rodham Clinton: A Woman Living History, a biography of Hillary Rodham Clinton, and followed Clinton through her 2016 presidential campaign; Blumenthal had to hastily rewrite the ending of the book when it became clear that Clinton had not won the election.

She taught journalism with her husband at Duke University and Texas Christian University.

She began writing young-adult novels in 2016.

== Awards ==
Blumenthal’s work has been awarded:

- Robert F. Sibert Informational Book Medal
- Jane Addams Children’s Book Award
- Kentucky Bluegrass Award
- YALSA’s Award for Nonfiction (three time finalist)

Her article: Grande Expectations: A Year in the Life of Starbucks’ Stock, was named by Kiplinger’s magazine as one of the five best investing reads of 2007. In 2003, her Six Days in October: The Stock Market Crash of 1929, won the Sibert Honor Book. In 2008, she received the Futrell Award for Outstanding Achievement in Communications and Journalism.

== Personal life ==
Blumenthal was married to Scott McCartney, a fellow journalist at The Wall Street Journal. The couple has two children.

She was an activist for Dallas public libraries. Blumenthal’s hobbies included needlepoint, for which she won medals at the Texas State Fair, and baking.

Blumenthal died from a heart attack in May 2020, at the age of 61.
