= Sally M. Walker =

American writer (born 1956)

- Born: 1956 (age 69–70); New Jersey, U.S.
- Education: Upsala College (BA)
- Occupation: Writer
- Spouse: James Walker (m. 1974)
- Children: 2
- Writing career
- Genres: Non-fiction; children's literature; young adult literature

Sally Macart Walker (born 1956) is an American writer of nonfiction for children. She is best known for writing about scientific subject matter such as Mystery Fish: Secrets of the Coelacanth (2005) or Written in Bone: Buried Lives of Jamestown and Colonial Maryland (2009). Additionally, Walker is known for books written in both Spanish and English (bilingual books) as seen in La Luz/Light (2007) and La Electricidad/Electricity (2007). She is also known as Sally Fleming.

== Life ==
Walker was born in New Jersey in 1956 and now lives in DeKalb, Illinois. In 1974 she married James Walker, an igneous petrologist, and she is the mother of two children. Walker earned her B.A. at Upsala College in 1975. Her avocational interests are hiking, reading, cooking, and gardening. She holds memberships in the International Reading Association and the Society of Children's Book Writers and Illustrators.

== Career ==
Walker is a literature consultant and an author of nonfiction juvenile literature. Before becoming an author of children's literature Walker worked for Junction Book Store in DeKalb, IL as a children's book buyer (1988–94). She was also employed with Anderson's Bookshops in Naperville, IL as a children's literature consultant (1988) as well as a children's book specialist (1994). For a short time, Walker was an adjunct instructor for Northern Illinois University (1992–2005).

In 2006, her book Secrets of a Civil War Submarine: Solving the Mysteries of the H.L. Hunley won the Sibert Medal.

== Selected works ==
- Deadly Aim: The Civil War Story of Michigan's Anishinaabe Sharpshooters (Henry Holt) (2019)
- Champion (2018)
- Sinking the Sultana (2017)
- Winnie: The True Story of the Bear Who Inspired Winnie-the-Pooh (2015)
- Boundaries: How the Mason-Dixon Line Settled a Family Feud and Divided a Nation (Candlewick Press) (2014)
- Ghost Walls: The Story of a 17th-Century Colonial Homestead (Carolrhoda Books) (2014)
- Freedom Song: The Story of Henry "Box" Brown (HarperCollins) (2012)
- Blizzard of Glass: The Halifax Explosion of 1917 (2011)
- Druscilla's Halloween (Carolrhoda Picture Books) (2009)
- Written in Bone: Buried Lives of Jamestown and Colonial Maryland (2009)
- Mosquitoes (Early Bird Nature Books) (2008)
- Jaguars (Nature Watch) (2008)
- The Search for Antarctic Dinosaurs (On My Own Science) (2008)
- La Electricidad/Electricity (Libros De Energia Para Madrugadores/Early Bird Energy) (2007)
- El Calor/ Heat (Libros De Energia Para Madrugadores / Early Bird Energy) (2007)
- La Luz/Light (Libros De Energia Para Madrugadores/Early Bird Energy) (2007)
- El Magnetismo/Magnetism (Libros De Energia Para Madrugadores/Early Bird Energy) (2007)
- Caves (Early Bird Earth Science) (2007)
- Glaciers (Early Bird Earth Science) (2007)
- Reefs (Early Bird Earth Science) (2007)
- La Materia/Matter (Libros De Energia Para Madrugadores/Early Bird Energy) (2007)
- El Sonido/Sound (Libros De Energia Para Madrugadores/Early Bird Energy) (2007)
- Shipwreck Search: Discovery of the H. L. Hunley (On My Own Science) (2006)
- Minerals (Early Bird Earth Science) (2006)
- Soil (Early Bird Earth Science) (2006)
- Fossils (Early Bird Earth Science) (2006)
- Rocks (Early Bird Earth Science) (2006)
- Sound (Early Bird Energy) (2005)
- Electricity (Early Bird Energy) (2005)
- Planos Inclinados/Inclined Planes And Wedges (Libros De Fisica Para Madrugadores) (2005)
- Palancas/Levers (Libros De Fisica Para Madrugadores) (2005)
- Tornillos/Screws (Libros De Fisica) (2005)
- Poleas/Pulleys (Libros De Fisica Para Madrugadores) (2005)
- Ruedas Y Ejes/Wheels And Axles (Libros De Fisica Para Madrugadores) (2005)
- Trabajo/Work (Libros De Fiscia) (2005)
- Jackie Robinson (Yo Solo Biografias) (2005)
- Matter (Early Bird Energy) (2005)
- Mystery Fish: Secrets Of The Coelacanth (On My Own Science) (2005)
- Heat (Early Bird Energy) (2005)
- Crocodiles (Nature Watch) (2003)
- Bessie Coleman: Daring to Fly (On My Own Biography) (2003)
- Life in an Estuary: The Chesapeake Bay (Ecosystems in Action) (2002)
- Rays (Nature Watch) (2002)
- Jackie Robinson (On My Own Biographies) (2002)
- Fossil Fish Found Alive: Discovering the Coelacanth (Carolrhoda Photo Books) (2002)
- Sea Horses's Surprise (Ocean Life Mini Book) (2001)
- Work (Early Bird Physics) (2001)
- Levers (Early Bird Physics) (2001)
- Wheels and Axles (Early Bird Physics) (2001)
- Pulleys (Early Bird Physics) (2001)
- Inclined Planes and Wedges (Early Bird Physics) (2001)
- Screws (Early Bird Physics) (2001)
- Seahorse Reef: A Story of the South Pacific (2001)
- Fireflies (Early Bird Nature Books) (2001)
- Mary Anning: Fossil Hunter (On My Own Biographies) (2000)
- Manatees (Nature Watch) (1999)
- Dolphins (Nature Watch) (1999)
- Sea Horses (Nature Watch) (1998)
- The 18 Penny Goose (An I Can Read Book) (1998)
- Hippos (Nature Watch) (1997)
- Opossum at Sycamore Road, Micro Book (1997)
- Opossum at Sycamore Road (Smithsonian Backyard) (1997)
- Rhinos (Nature Watch) (1996)
- "Space Bucks" Official Secrets and Solutions (Secrets of the Game) (1996)
- Earthquakes (Earthwatch) (1996)
- Volcanoes: Earth's Inner Fire: A Carolrhoda Earth Watch Book (Earth Watch) (1994)
- Water Up, Water Down: The Hydrologic Cycle (Carolrhoda Earth Watch Book) (1992)
- Born Near the Earth's Surface: Sedimentary Rocks (Earth Processes Books) (1991)
- Glaciers: Ice on the Move (A Carolrhoda Earth Watch Book) (1990)
- Secrets of a Civil War Submarine (Solving The Mysteries Of The H. L. Hunley) (1990)
