= Carla Killough McClafferty =

American author

Carla Killough McClafferty (born July 11, 1958) is an American author of non-fiction for children, writing mostly about science and history. The International Reading Association awarded the 2007 Children's Book Award for Intermediate Nonfiction to her book Something Out of Nothing: Marie Curie and Radium. The National Council of Teachers of English gave a 2008 Orbis Pictus Recommended book designation to In Defiance of Hitler: The Secret Mission of Varian Fry.
