= Lawrence Kushner =

American rabbi and writer (born 1943)

Rabbi Lawrence Kushner
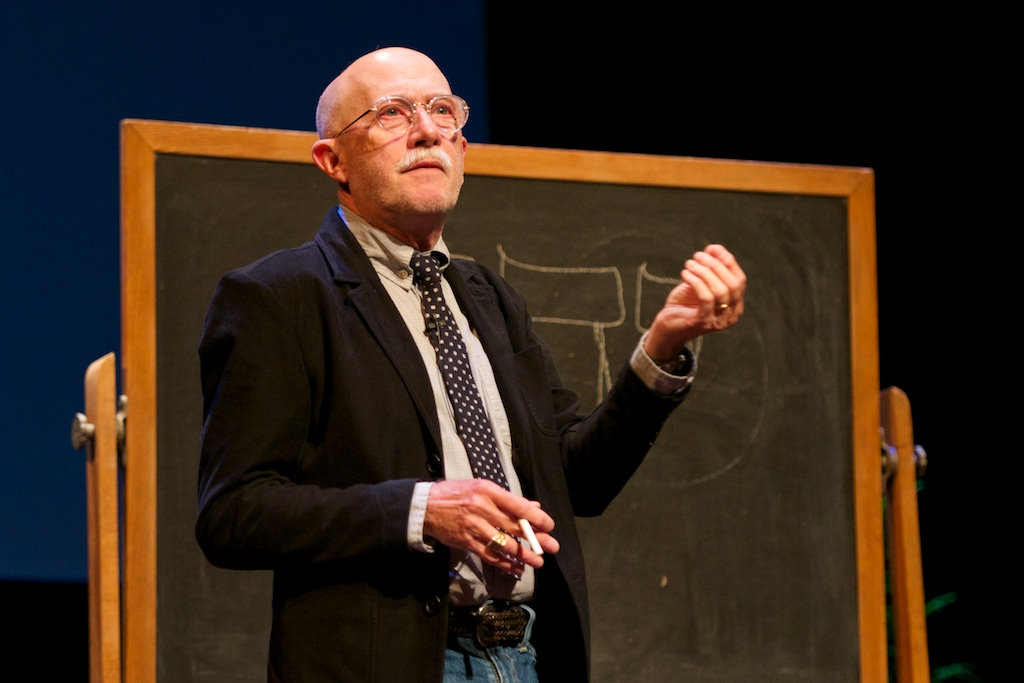
- Kushner at the 2016 Festival of Faiths

Personal life
- Born: 1943 Detroit, Michigan
- Education: University of Cincinnati, Hebrew Union College

Religious life
- Religion: Judaism
- Denomination: Reform
- Synagogue: Congregation Beth El of the Sudbury River Valley
- Position: Rabbi
- Began: 1971
- Ended: 1999
- Website: www.rabbikushner.org

Lawrence Kushner (born 1943) is a Reform rabbi and the scholar-in-residence at Congregation Emanu-El in San Francisco, California.

== Biography ==
Born in Detroit in 1943, Kushner graduated Phi Beta Kappa from the University of Cincinnati and went on to receive his rabbinical ordination from the Hebrew Union College in Cincinnati. He served for 28 years at Congregation Beth-El in Sudbury, Massachusetts, and currently serves as the Emanu-El Scholar-in-Residence at Congregation Emanu-El of San Francisco.

In addition, he is an adjunct member of the faculty of the Hebrew Union College in Los Angeles, and he has taught spirituality and mysticism, and has mentored rabbinic students as a visiting professor at the Hebrew Union College-Jewish Institute of Religion in New York City.

Kushner and his wife have three adult children. His daughter, Noa, is the founding rabbi at The Kitchen, an independent congregation in San Francisco.

== Books ==
Rabbi Kushner has authored and co-authored numerous articles, as well as more than 18 books, for children and adults, which have been translated into six languages.

- Honey from the Rock: Visions of Jewish Mystical Renewal, Jewish Lights Publishing, 1977. ISBN 978-0-06-064901-2
- The Invisible Chariot: An Introduction to Kabbalah and Spirituality for Young Adults, with Deborah Kerdeman, A.R.E. Publishing, 1986.
- The River of Light: Spirituality, Judaism, Consciousness Jewish Lights Publishing 2nd edition, September 1990, ISBN 1-879045-03-6 ISBN 978-1879045033
- The Book of Letters: A Mystical Alef-Bait Jewish Lights Publishing, 1990. ISBN 978-1-879045-00-2
- God Was in This Place and I, i Did Not Know: Finding Self, Spirituality, and Ultimate Meaning Jewish Lights Publishing, 1993.
- Sparks beneath the Surface: A Spiritual Commentary on the Torah, Translator and editor, with Rabbi Kerry Olitsky, Jason Aronson, December 1993.
- The Book of Miracles: A Young Person's Guide to Jewish Spiritual Awareness Union of American Hebrew Congregations, 1987. Jewish Lights Publishing; 10th anniversary edition, 1997. ISBN 978-1-879045-78-1
- Invisible Lines of Connection: Sacred Stories of the Ordinary Jewish Lights Publishing, March 1998, ISBN 978-1-879045-98-9
- The Book of Words (Sefer Shel Devarim): Talking Spiritual Life, Living Spiritual Talk Jewish Lights Publishing, September 1998 ISBN 978-1-58023-020-9
- Eyes Remade for Wonder: A Lawrence Kushner Reader Jewish Lights Publishing, September 1998. ISBN 978-1-58023-042-1
- Kabbalah: The Way of Light Peter Pauper Press, 1999. ISBN 978-0-88088-101-2
- Honey from the Rock: An Introduction to Jewish Mysticism Jewish Lights Publishing, December 1999. ISBN 978-1-58023-073-5
- Because Nothing Looks Like God Jewish Lights Publishing, November 2000. ISBN 978-1-58023-092-6
- Where Is God?, with Karen Kushner, illustrated by Dawn W. Majewski, Skylight Paths, 2000.
- How Does God Make Things Happen?, with Karen Kushner, illustrated by Dawn W. Majewski, Skylight Paths, 2001.
- Jewish Spirituality: A Brief Introduction for Christians Jewish Lights Publishing, August 2001, ISBN 978-1-58023-150-3. Rabbi Kushner dedicated this book to two Christian friends, the Catholic monk who cofounded the centering prayer movement, M. Basil Pennington; and writer and publisher Jon M. Sweeney.
- What Does God Look Like?, with Karen Kushner, illustrated by Dawn W. Majewski, Skylight Paths, 2001.
- Five Cities of Refuge: Weekly Reflections on Genesis, Exodus, Leviticus, Numbers, and Deuteronomy, with David Mamet, Schocken Bilingual edition, 2003. ISBN 978-0-8052-4220-1
- In God's Hands, with Gary Schmidt, Jewish Lights Publishing, June 27, 2005. ISBN 978-1-58023-224-1
- Kabbalah: A Love Story, Morgan Road Books, 2006. ISBN 978-0-7679-2412-2
- Filling Words with Light: Hasidic and Mystical Reflections on Jewish Prayer, with Rabbi Nehemia Polen, Jewish Lights Publishing, August 30, 2007. ISBN 978-1-58023-238-8
- I'm God; You're not: Observations on Organized Religion & Other Disguises of the Ego, Jewish Lights Publishing, October 2010, ISBN 978-1-58023-441-2
