= Brain freeze (disambiguation) =

Brain freeze is an alternative name for a cold-stimulus headache.

Brain freeze may also refer to:

- Brainfreeze (album), 1999 live mix album by DJ Shadow and Cut Chemist
- Brain Freeze (film), a 2021 zombie film directed by Julien Knafo
- Brain Freeze, 2007 book in the Otto Undercover miniseries
- Brain Freeze, parody song in The Simpsons' episode "That '90s Show"
- "Brain Freeze", episode from the 17th season of Arthur
- "Brain Freeze", series finale of the show Fanboy & Chum Chum
- "Brain Freeze", trademark used on the 7-eleven slurpee

== See also ==
- Brain Freezer, character on the American-Canadian cartoon show Johnny Test
