= Andrea Wang =

Asian American children's author

Andrea Wang (traditional: 陳郁如 / simplified: 陈郁如 / pinyin: Chén Yùrú) is an American author of children's books. Her fiction and nonfiction picture books and middle grade novels focusing on the Asian and Asian-American experience have earned numerous awards and accolades.

== Biography ==
The daughter of Chinese immigrants, Andrea Wang was born in Cambridge, Massachusetts. From the ages of 2 to 13, she lived in the town of Yellow Springs, Ohio. Her family then returned to the Boston area, and she went on to major in Biology and Chinese Studies at Wellesley College. She credits meeting author Nien Cheng at Wellesley as a "pivotal moment" for giving her "the confidence to pursue a second career as an author."

She received her MS in Environmental Science from the School of Public and Environmental Affairs at Indiana University Bloomington, from which she used what she had learned to "make the setting a character" in her writing. After working for over a decade as an environmental consultant, she completed an MFA in Creative Writing for Young People at Lesley University.

Wang began her publishing career writing non-fiction articles and books about scientific and environmental topics. Her first fiction book, The Nian Monster, was published in 2016, and received the Honor Award from the Asian Pacific American Librarians Association. Her autobiographical picture book Watercress describes her experience growing up as one of the few Chinese Americans in rural Ohio. According to the book's illustrator Jason Chin, Watercress taps into universal themes. In 2022, the book won the Asian/Pacific American Award for Literature for Picture Book, Caldecott Medal, and Newbery Honor.

Wang currently resides with her family in Colorado.

== Bibliography ==
- Wang, Andrea (2019). The Nian Monster. Illustrated by Alina Chau. La Vergne: Weigl Publishers Inc. ISBN 978-1-7911-0726-0. OCLC 1124593129.
- Wang, Andrea (2019). Magic ramen : the story of Momofuku Ando. Illustrated by Kana Urbanowicz (1st ed.). New York, NY. ISBN 978-1-4998-0703-5. OCLC 1033577041.
- Wang, Andrea (2021). The many meanings of Meilan. New York. ISBN 978-0-593-11128-4. OCLC 1225190473.
- Wang, Andrea (2021). Watercress. Illustrated by Jason Chin (1st ed.). New York. ISBN 978-0-8234-5054-1. OCLC 1243560991.
- Wang, Andrea (2022). Luli and the language of tea. Illustrated by Hyewon Yum (1st ed.). New York. ISBN 978-0-8234-4614-8. OCLC 1249708719.
