= Steve Sheinkin =

American author

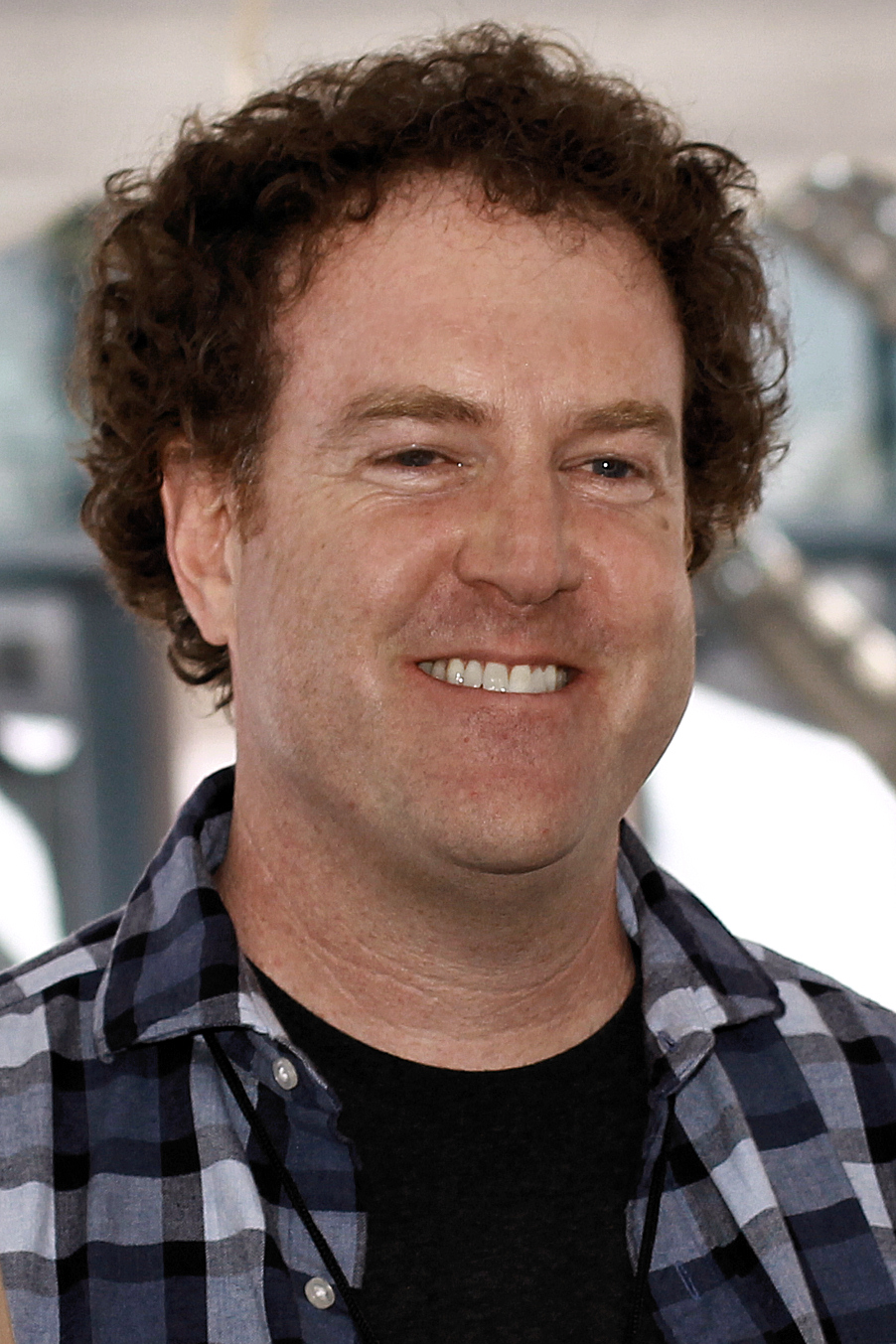
- Sheinkin at the 2019 Texas Book Festival

Steve Sheinkin (born 1968) is an American author of suspenseful history books for young adults. A former textbook writer, Sheinkin began writing full-time nonfiction books for young readers in 2008. His work has been praised for making historical information more accessible.

== Rabbi Harvey ==
Sheinkin has written and illustrated three fictional graphic novels about Rabbi Harvey, a fictional Jewish rabbi who also functions as an Old West sheriff, using Jewish rabbinical wisdom to solve problems usually solved with firearms in the fictional Rocky Mountain town of Elk Spring, Colorado. The books, which were published through Jewish Lights Publishing, consist of The Adventures of Rabbi Harvey, Rabbi Harvey Rides Again, and Rabbi Harvey vs. the Wisdom Kid. The eclectic stories, which combine Jewish legends and frontier legends, sprung from Sheinkin's own eclectic childhood as a Jewish-American boy raised on both Jewish folktales and American Westerns. The character of Rabbi Harvey also contains elements of the author's own father, David Sheinkin.

== Awards and honors ==
Sheinkin's nonfiction books, Bomb: The Race to Build—and Steal—the World's Most Dangerous Weapon and The Port Chicago 50: Disaster, Mutiny, and the Fight for Civil Rights, were both National Book Award finalists. In 2013, Bomb also won the Newbery Honor and Sibert Medal from the American Library Association. The Port Chicago 50 won the Carter G. Woodson Book Award in 2015. His 2015 book, Most Dangerous: Daniel Ellsberg and the Secret History of the Vietnam War, was also a finalist for the National Book Award, and was called “easily the best study of the Vietnam War available for teen readers. In 2020, he won the Margaret A. Edwards Award. His latest book, Impossible Escape, was a Sydney Taylor Book Award Honor winner.

== Select bibliography ==
=== Non-fiction ===
- Impossible Escape: A True Story Of Survival and Heroism in Nazi Europe, Roaring Brook Press, 2023
- Bomb (Graphic Novel): The Race to Build–and Steal–the World's Most Dangerous Weapon, Roaring Brook Press, 2023
- Fallout: Spies, Superbombs, and the Ultimate Cold War Showdown, Roaring Brook Press, 2021
- Born to Fly: The First Women's Air Race Across America, Roaring Brook Press, 2019
- Undefeated: Jim Thorpe and the Carlisle Indian School Football Team, Roaring Brook Press, 2017
- Most Dangerous: Daniel Ellsberg and the Secret History of the Vietnam War, Roaring Brook Press, 2015
- The Port Chicago 50: Disaster, Mutiny, and the Fight for Civil Rights, Roaring Brook Press, 2014
- The Notorious Benedict Arnold: A True Story of Adventure, Heroism & Treachery, Square Fish, 2013
- Lincoln's Grave Robbers, Scholastic Press, 2013
- Bomb: The Race to Build—and Steal—the World's Most Dangerous Weapon, Roaring Brook Press, 2012
- Everything Your Schoolbooks Didn't Tell You series
  - Which Way to the Wild West? Everything Your Schoolbooks Didn't Tell You About Westward Expansion, Flash Point, 2009
  - Two Miserable Presidents, Everything Your Schoolbooks Didn't Tell You About the Civil War, Square Fish, 2008
  - King George: What Was His Problem?: Everything Your Schoolbooks Didn't Tell You About the American Revolution, Flash Point, 2005

=== Fiction ===
- Time Twisters series
  - Neil Armstrong and Nat Love, Space Cowboys, Roaring Brook Press, 2019
  - Amelia Earhart and the Flying Chariot, Roaring Brook Press, 2019
  - Abigail Adams, Pirate of the Caribbean, Roaring Brook Press, 2018
  - Abraham Lincoln, Pro Wrestler, Roaring Brook Press, 2018
- Rabbi Harvey graphic novel series
  - Rabbi Harvey vs. the Wisdom Kid: A Graphic Novel of Dueling Jewish Folktales in the Wild West, Jewish Lights Publishing, 2010
  - Rabbi Harvey Rides Again: A Graphic Novel of Jewish Folktales Let Loose in the Wild West, Jewish Lights Publishing, 2008
  - The Adventures of Rabbi Harvey: A Graphic Novel of Jewish Wisdom and Wit in the Wild West, Jewish Lights Publishing, 2006
- The Bletchley Riddle, co-written with Ruta Sepetys, Viking Books for Young Readers, 2024
