= Rabbi Harvey =

Titular character of eponymous graphic novel series

Rabbi Harvey is a series of three graphic novels by Steve Sheinkin comprising The Adventures of Rabbi Harvey (2006), Rabbi Harvey Rides Again (2008), and Rabbi Harvey vs. the Wisdom Kid (2010), all published through Jewish Lights Publishing.

== Character ==
Rabbi Harvey is a rabbi who also functions as an Old West sheriff in the fictional Rocky Mountain frontier town of Elk Spring, Colorado. Harvey solves disputes with rabbinical wit and wisdom rather than a gun. In The Adventures of Rabbi Harvey and Rabbi Harvey Rides Again, which were published first, each chapter is a separate story, whereas in the third book, Rabbi Harvey vs. the Wisdom Kid, each chapter is part of a larger story arc. Each story takes inspiration from one or more Jewish folktales and puts a Western spin on it. This eclectic mixing of genres sprang from Sheinkin's childhood as a Jewish-American boy who read both Jewish legends and American Westerns. Rabbi Harvey not only contains elements of a wise mythical rabbi and a heroic lawman but also reflects the author's father, David Sheinkin.

=== Appearance ===
Sheinkin, who illustrates as well as writes the Harvey books, always portrays Harvey with a full beard and thick unibrow. According to the chapter "You're a Brave Man, Harvey" in The Adventures of Rabbi Harvey, "Harvey grew up in the Adirondack Mountains of northern New York." He had a sister and constantly daydreamed of being a character in Bible stories. How Harvey came out West is not entirely clear. In the chapter "There's a New Rabbi in Town" in The Adventures of Rabbi Harvey, it is indicated that Harvey had never been out West when he came to Elk Spring looking for a rabbi job after graduating in New York City while working at a pickle factory. However, in the chapter "Deputy Harvey, San Francisco" in Rabbi Harvey Rides Again, Harvey appears to have been a much younger, beardless man when he sails from New York to San Francisco "with nothing but ten dollars and a change of clothes." There he works selling bread and as a sheriff's deputy.

== Other characters ==
One recurring character is Milton "Big Milt" Wasserman, an outlaw who appears with his two-man "gang" as reigning with terror over Elk Spring before Harvey's arrival. Big Milt appears again in Rabbi Harvey Rides Again with his incompetent son Wolfie, both of whom appear throughout Rabbi Harvey vs. the Wisdom Kid, in which Wolfie is elected sheriff by the town council of Helms Falls. Another major villain is “Bad Bubbe” Bloom, a conniving grandmother who appears in The Adventures of Rabbi Harvey as the proprietor of Bubbe's Inn, running a bakery booth in Rabbi Harvey Rides Again, and again in Rabbi Harvey vs. the Wisdom Kid, along with sons Solomon Bloom III, a banker, and Rabbi Ruben “The Wisdom Kid” Bloom. A final recurring character is Harvey's love interest, Abigail, who first appears in Rabbi Harvey Rides Again as a down-on-her-luck gold miner who travels to Elk Spring and becomes the town's schoolteacher; she reappears in Rabbi Harvey vs. the Wisdom Kid.
