= Grand Canyon (book) =

2017 picture book by Jason Chin

- Author: Jason Chin
- Publisher: Roaring Brook Press, Macmillan Publishing
- Publication date: February 21, 2017
- Pages: 54
- Awards: Caldecott Honor, Sibert Honor
- ISBN: 978-1-59643-950-4
- OCLC: 1059176926
- Website: http://jasonchin.net/books/grand-canyon/

Grand Canyon by Jason Chin is a 2017 children's picture book. The book tells about the plants, animals and habitats of the Grand Canyon, both now and in the past, using the premise of a hiking trip there. The inspiration for the book was a trip in high school; Chin had originally conceived of a Grand Canyon origin story. The book marked the first time Chin used die cuts, in addition to his normal use of pen and ink, watercolors, and gouache. The book was awarded a 2018 Caldecott Honor for its illustrations and a 2018 Sibert Honor for its informative text. Grand Canyon is one of only a few non-fiction books that are not biographies to be recognized by the Caldecott.

== Synopsis ==
Grand Canyon's illustrations use the conceit of a day trip between an Asian American father and his daughter, while the text gives information about the different plants, animals, and habitats found in the Grand Canyon. While some pages are in the present day, others take the reader into the past. The book is told in the second person and ends with backmatter where Chin provides additional scientific information and an author's note, which he uses to describe his process of creating the book.

Hiking map of the Grand Canyon

== Background and publication ==
Chin had always considered the Grand Canyon as a topic for a book after a formative trip he took there in high school. His original concept was for an "origin story" of the Canyon based on his high school knowledge of it being six million years old. After pitching the book to his publisher, Chin purchased Carving Grand Canyon by Wayne Ranney. Reading Ranney's book, Chin discovered that scientists had become more uncertain about when the Grand Canyon was formed, and that it could be up to ten times older than he learned when in high school. This presented the biggest challenge of the book as he needed a new story arc to serve as the book's hook. His breakthrough for a new premise came when walking in the forest with his own child; he realized he wanted to tell the story through a father-daughter trip, saying: "Once I had these two characters that resonated with me it was much easier to create the story around them."

In his research, Chin found that there were three distinct topics – geology, ecology, and paleontology – that would each need to be explored in order to tell the "biography" of the place. This presented challenges for Chin, as there was more information than could be included in the pages he had available to the topic. The writing and illustrations are closely connected; Chin finds a change in one of them frequently leads to a change in the other.

The book was published on February 21, 2017, by Roaring Book Press.

== Writing and illustrations ==
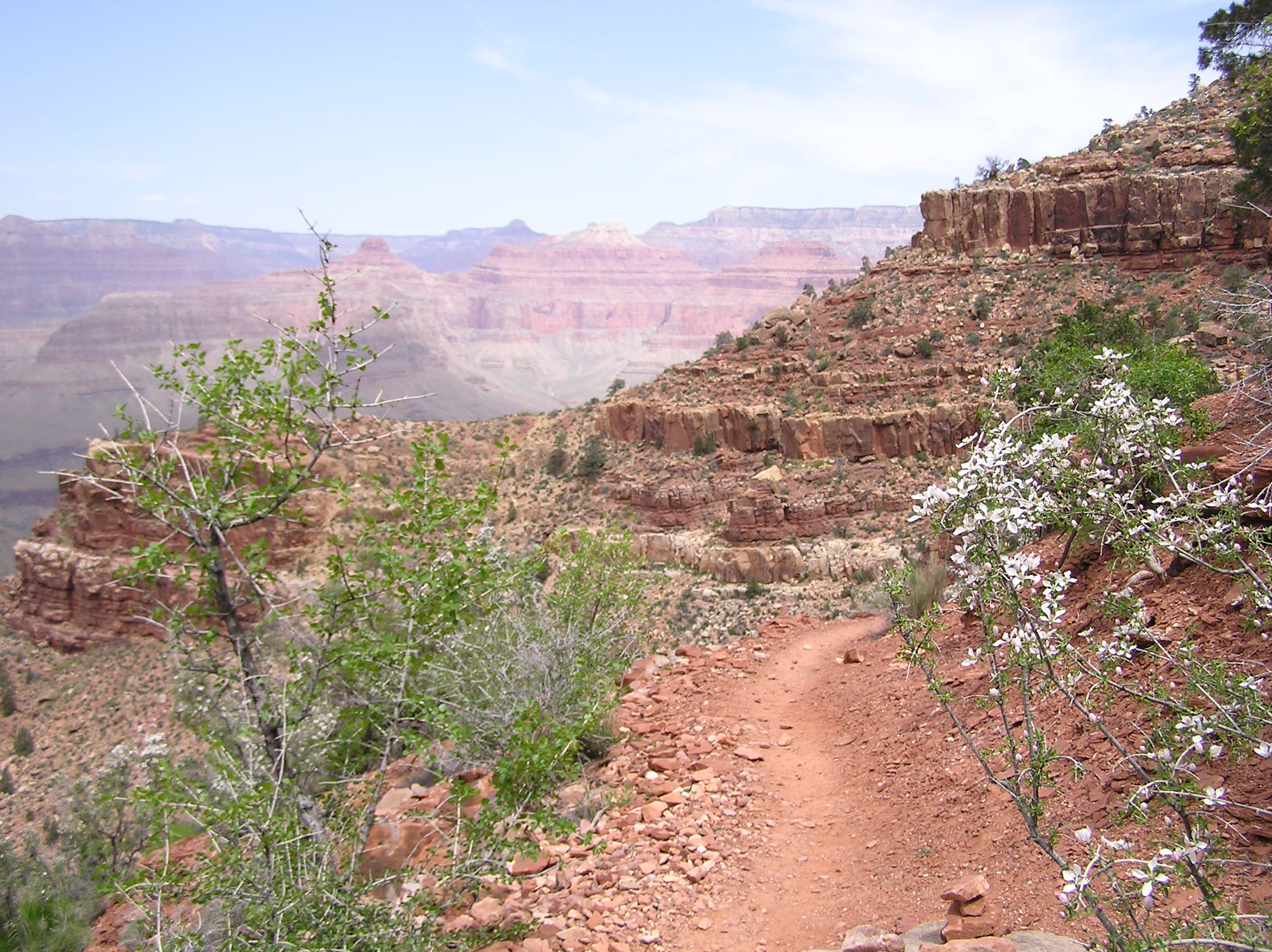
An image from the Grand Canyon's hermit trail, one of the trails used as an inspiration for the book.

Some critics labeled the book as like a tour guide, with it including a two-page map at the start. Chin tried to remain true to his experience visiting the Canyon and to a plausible recreation of the past, except in two illustrations. However, some elements, such as the lighting and colors of prehistoric plants and animals, were imagined by Chin for the book. As a result, critics saw the illustrations as helping to effectively convey the information about the Grand Canyon. The borders of each page have plants and animals serving as the frame. Several reviewers also praised the effect of the gatefold pages for creating an inspiring panoramic display of the Grand Canyon.

Chin used die cuts for the first time, along with his typical mix of pen and ink, watercolors, and gouache. He uses watercolors and gouache because they are practical, with gauche being a little more forgiving while watercolors require planning to move from sketch to the final illustrations. Betsey Bird of Horn Book praised Chin's use of die cuts for the way that he uses them to connect the present and the past. John Peters for School Library Journal also commented on Chin's ability to "transport" the reader through the design of the book, including the gatefold and the book's cut-outs that serve as a link through pages between the past and present. Because of the book's premise changing between times, consecutive pages can show different habitats, such as going from desert to the aquatic.

== Reception and awards ==
The book was well received. Starred reviews from Booklist, where reviewer Anita Locke wrote of its "brilliant artwork", Bulletin of the Center for Children's Books, Horn Book, and School Library Journal, all praised the book's illustrations. In its starred review, Publishers Weekly described it as "a stunningly illustrated story of a magical father-daughter hike". Danielle Ford in Booklist's starred review gave particular praise to the informational text, writing how Chin was able to bring the past "to life through scientific imagination." Kirkus Reviews was less complimentary than others, positively reviewing the book's illustrations but comparing it unfavorably to other works of Chin's, saying it has a "relatively dry factual approach".

The book received a 2018 Sibert Honor, with committee praising the illustrations in its citation, "Through magnificent panoramic illustrations, meticulously researched diagrams and lucid text, Jason Chin has created a book as grand as the canyon itself." It was also awarded a 2018 Caldecott Honor, with the committee praising how "Chin uses watercolor, gouache and pen and ink to render sweeping landscapes, culminating in an epic gatefold panorama." The book was unusual in receiving Caldecott recognition. Few nonfiction books besides biographies, and especially few science books, have been honored in the past.
