= Choosing Brave: How Mamie Till-Mobley and Emmett Till Sparked the Civil Rights Movement =

2023 Caldecott picture book

- Author: Angela Joy
- Illustrator: Janelle Washington
- Genre: Children's picture book
- Publisher: Roaring Brook Press
- Publication date: 2022
- Publication place: United States

Choosing Brave is a 2022 picture book written by Angela Joy and illustrated by Janelle Washington and published by Roaring Brook Press.The book was a recipient of a 2023 Caldecott Honor for its illustrations.

It won several awards in 2023 including Coretta Scott King - John Steptoe Award for New Talent New Talent Award, the Robert F. Sibert Informational Book Medal, the Walter Dean Myers Award, and the Jane Addams Children's Book Award.
