= Mara Rockliff =

American children's writer (born 1969/70)

- Education: Brown University
- Occupation: Writer
- Writing career
- Pen name: Lewis B. Montgomery; Eleanor May; Nan Walker
- Years active: 2004–present (as of 2023)
- Genres: Children's literature Picture books Chapter books
- Notable awards: Golden Kite Award; Orbis Pictus Honor; Sibert Honor
- Website: mararockliff.com

Mara Rockliff (born 1969 or 1970) is an American author of children's books specializing in works based on true stories. Her book Mesmerized: How Ben Franklin Solved a Mystery that Baffled All of France won an Orbis Pictus Honor from the National Council of Teachers of English. The American Library Association selected her book Sweet Justice: Georgia Gilmore and the Montgomery Bus Boycott for a Sibert Honor. She also received the Golden Kite Award for Me and Momma and Big John.

== Career ==
=== Editor ===
Rockliff began her career as an assistant editor for a textbook company in New York City. This job involved research and many visits to the New York Public Library. Later, she was a senior editor for Holt, Rinehart & Winston.

=== Freelance writer ===
Eventually, Rockliff became a freelance writer for educational publishers. Using the pen names Eleanor May and Nan Walker, she wrote books for several educational series, including Math Matters, Science Solves It!, Social Studies Connects and, most notably, the Mouse Math series which includes more than fifteen titles. The Mouse Math book, Albert the Muffin Maker, was the 2014 Moonbeam Children's Book Awards Bronze Medalist for Alphabet/Counting.

Rockliff also wrote the twelve books of the Milo and Jazz Mysteries chapter book series using the pen name Lewis B. Montgomery. Booklist selected her book, The Case of the Stinky Socks from the Milo and Jazz series, for "100 Best Children's and YA Mysteries of the Past 10 Years." The second book in the series, The Case of the Poisoned Pig, was nominated for an Agatha Award.

=== Author ===
Rockliff began publishing books under her name in 2005. In 2013, she won an Honor from the Ezra Jack Keats Book Award for her book My Heart Will Not Sit Down, a picture book about a girl in Cameroon who tries to raise money to help those who were starving in New York City during the Great Depression. Her fourth book under the name Mara Rockliff, Me and Momma and Big John (2013), was nominated for the Charlotte Zolotow Award and won the Golden Kite Award from the Society of Children's Book Writers and Illustrators. The Charlotte Zolotow Award is the highest honor for writing in children's picture books. The book is about an African American female stonecutter who helped build the Cathedral of St. John the Divine in New York City in the 1970s.

Rockliff specializes in historical picture books for children, especially true stories about people who are not included in traditional histories. For example, she was inspired to write Born to Swing: Lil Hardin Armstrong's Life in Jazz when she realized female musicians were left out of the history of jazz music. She has written books about the female magician Adelaide Herrmann, pioneering filmmaker Alice Guy Blaché, World War II engineer Beatrice Shilling, and suffragists Alice Burke and Nell Richardson.

Rockliff enjoys baking and frequently incorporates baked goods or recipes in her books, testing the latter herself. Her Gingerbread for Liberty (2016) is about Christopher Ludwick, a Philadelphia baker who was too old to fight in the Revolutionary War but supported General George Washington's army by baking bread for the troops. Rockliff learned of Ludwick in a 1964 magazine article about Pennsylvania Dutch cooking traditions. She says, "That grabbed me right away since it combined fun stuff for kids—sneaky secret agent, gingerbread—with fun historical stuff for parents and teachers. Also, I live in a very German part of Pennsylvania, and my daughter has Hessian ancestors on her father's side, so the topic had special interest to me." Rockliff's Sweet Justice: Georgia Gilmore and the Montgomery Bus Boycott (2023) is another food-related book, telling the story of a lesser-known Civil Rights activist who raised money for the Montgomery Bus Boycott by cooking and selling food.

Other books by Rockwell share unusual facts about famous people. Mesmerized: How Ben Franklin Solved a Mystery that Baffled All of France (2017) tells how Benjamin Franklin used the scientific method to debunk the mysterious powers of Franz Mesmer's magic wand. A similar title, 2020's Jefferson Measures a Moose (2020) tells how Thomas Jefferson used math to counter misinformation in a book about animals of the United States. Rockliff says, " I thought this story could do for math and measurement what Mesmerized did for the scientific method." In addition, Rockliff was exploring the concept of misinformation through the lens of current events in 2020.

Rockliff learned Esperanto and began using it daily to talk with people worldwide in 2014. This led to her writing Doctor Esperanto and the Language of Hope (2020), a book about L. L. Zamenhoff who invented the universal language of Esperanto. The book was selected as a Notable Picture Book by the Sydney Taylor Book Award.

Rockliff considers herself a "research geek." She studies interviews, newspapers, oral histories, and primary source materials to create her books, and also includes a list of primary sources in her history books. She got the idea to write Try It! How Frieda Caplan Changed the Way We Eat (2021) when looking through the Jewish Women's Archive. As a Jewish woman, Rockliff felt it was important to write a book about a Jewish woman like Frieda Caplan, who founded a specialty produce company and introduced kiwis, baby carrots, mushrooms, sugar snap peas, spaghetti squash, and mangos to consumers in the United States. Rockliff worked with Caplan's daughter to create Try It! which was selected by Smithsonian magazine as one of the ten best children's books of 2021.

== Awards ==
- 2011 – Green Earth Book Award Honor Book for Get Real: What Kind of World Are You Buying?
- 2013 – Ezra Jack Keats Book Award Honor for My Heart Will Not Sit Down
- 2013 – Golden Kite Award for Me and Momma and Big John
- 2013 – Charlotte Zolotow Award Honor for Me and Momma and Big John
- 2014 – Moonbeam Children's Book Awards Bronze Medalist Alphabet/Counting for Albert the Muffin Maker
- 2015 – Anne Izard Storytellers' Choice Award for The Grudge Keeper
- 2016 – Cook Prize for Mesmerized: How Ben Franklin Solved a Mystery that Baffled All of France
- 2016 – Orbis Pictus Award Honor book for Mesmerized: How Ben Franklin Solved a Mystery that Baffled All of France
- 2016 – ALA Notable Children's Book for Gingerbread for Liberty: How a German Baker Helped Win the American Revolution
- 2017 – National Council for the Social Studies-Children's Book Council Notable Trade Books for Young People for Around America to Win the Vote: Two Suffragists, a Kitten, and 10,000 Miles
- 2018 – Garden State Children's Book Award for Gingerbread for Liberty: How a German Baker Helped Win the American Revolution
- 2018 – Land of Enchantment Book Award for Gingerbread for Liberty: How a German Baker Helped Win the American Revolution
- 2020 – Notable Picture Book, Sydney Taylor Book Award, Association of Jewish Libraries for Doctor Esperanto and the Language of Hope
- 2021 – Eureka! Excellence in Nonfiction Award Honor Title for Try It!: How Frieda Caplan Changed the Way We Eat
- 2023 – American Library Association Sibert Honor for Sweet Justice: Georgia Gilmore and the Montgomery Bus Boycott

== Personal life ==
Rockliff graduated from Brown University where she studied American history and literature. She lives with her family in Pennsylvania.

== Publications ==
=== As Mara Rockliff ===
- —— (2005). Pieces of Another World. Arbordale Publishing. ISBN 9780976494324.
- —— (2008). Next to an Ant. Rookie Readers. ISBN 9780516268309.
- —— (2010). Get Real: What Kind of World Are YOU Buying?. Running Press Kids. ISBN 9780762437450.
- —— (2012). The Busiest Street in Town. Knopf Books for Young Readers. ISBN 9780375985522.
- —— (2012). Me and Momma and Big John. Candlewick. ISBN 9780763643591.
- —— (2012). My Heart Will Not Sit Down. Knopf Books for Young Readers. ISBN 9780375987281.
- —— (2014). The Grudge Keeper. Peachtree. ISBN 9781682634776.
- —— (2015). Gingerbread for Liberty: How a German Baker Helped Win the American Revolution. Clarion Books. ISBN 9780544130012.
- —— (2016). Chik Chak Shabbat. Candlewick. ISBN 9780763688950.
- —— (2016). Anything But Ordinary Addie: The True Story of Adelaide Herrmann, Queen of Magic. Candlewick. ISBN 9780763668419.
- —— (2017). Mesmerized: How Ben Franklin Solved a Mystery that Baffled All of France. Candlewick. ISBN 9780763695156.
- —— (2017). Born to Swing: Lil Hardin Armstrong's Life in Jazz. Calkins Creek. ISBN 9781629795553.
- —— (2018). Lights! Camera! Alice!: The Thrilling True Adventures of the First Woman Filmmaker. Chronicle Books. ISBN 9781452141343.
- —— (2019). Around America to Win the Vote: Two Suffragists, a Kitten, and 10,000 Miles. Candlewick. ISBN 9781536208368.
- —— (2019). Billie Jean!: How Tennis Star Billie Jean King Changed Women's Sports. G.P. Putnam's Sons Books. ISBN 9780525517795.
- —— (2019). Doctor Esperanto and the Language of Hope. Candlewick. ISBN 9780763688950.
- —— (2020). Jefferson Measures a Moose. Candlewick. ISBN 9780763688950.
- —— (2021). The Girl Who Could Fix Anything: Beatrice Shilling, World War II Engineer. Candlewick. ISBN 9781536212525.
- —— (2021). Try It!: How Frieda Caplan Changed the Way We Eat. Beach Lane Books. ISBN 9781534460072.
- —— (2022). Sweet Justice: Georgia Gilmore and the Montgomery Bus Boycott. Random House Studio. ISBN 9781524720643.
- —— (2022). A Perfect Fit: How Lena "Lane" Bryant Changed the Shape of Fashion. Clarion Books. ISBN 9780358125433.

=== As Lewis B. Montgomery ===
1. —— (2009). The Case of the Stinky Socks. Kane Press. ISBN 9781575652856.
2. —— (2009). The Case of the Poisoned Pig. Kane Press. ISBN 9781575652863.
3. —— (2009). The Case of the Haunted Haunted House. Kane Press. ISBN 9781575652955.
4. —— (2009). The Case of the Amazing Zelda. Kane Press. ISBN 9781575652962.
5. —— (2010). The Case of the July 4th Jinx. Kane Press. ISBN 9781575653082.
6. —— (2011). The Case of the Missing Moose. Kane Press. ISBN 9781575653228.
7. —— (2011). The Case of the Purple Pool. Kane Press. ISBN 9781575653426.
8. —— (2012). The Case of the Diamonds in the Desk. Kane Press. ISBN 9781575653914.
9. —— (2012). The Case of the Crooked Campaign. Kane Press. ISBN 9781575654362.
10. —— (2013). The Case of the Superstar Scam. Kane Press. ISBN 9781575655192.
11. —— (2013). The Case of the Locked Box. Kane Press. ISBN 9781575656267.
12. —— (2014). The Case of the Buried Bones. Kane Press. ISBN 9781575656410.

=== As Eleanor May ===
- —— (2006). Real Me – Lib. Tandem Library. ISBN 9781417808670.
- —— (2007). Ty's Triple Trouble. Kane Press. ISBN 9781575652375.
- —— (2007). The Great Shape-Up. Kane Press. ISBN 9781575652481.
- —— (2008). Mac & Cheese, Pleeeeze!. Kane Press. ISBN 9781575652603.
- —— (2008). The Greatest Thing Ever. Catapult Learning. ISBN 9781934672945.
- —— (2008). A Visit From the King. Catapult Learning. ISBN 9781934672037.
- —— (2009). Keesha's Bright Idea. Astra Publishing. ISBN 9781575652733.
- —— (2009). Who Needs It?. Kane Press. ISBN 978-1-57565-281-8.
- —— (2010). The Best Mother's Day Ever. Kane Press. ISBN 978-1-57565-299-3.
- —— (2012). Albert's Amazing Snail. Kane Press. ISBN 9781575654423.
- —— (2012). The Mousier the Merrier. Kane Press. ISBN 9781575654478.
- —— (2013). Albert Is Not Scared. Kane Press. ISBN 9781575656298.
- —— (2013). Albert's Bigger Than Big Idea. Kane Press. ISBN 9781575655222.
- —— (2013). A Beach for Albert. Kane Press. ISBN 9781575655314.
- —— (2013). Mice of Ice. Kane Press. ISBN 9781575655284.
- —— (2013). Count Off, Squeak Scouts!. Kane Press. ISBN 978-1-57565-524-6.
- —— (2014). Albert the Muffin Maker. Kane Press. ISBN 9781575656328.
- —— (2014). Messy Mouse. Kane Press. ISBN 9781575656465.
- —— (2014). Albert Adds Up. Kane Press. ISBN 978-1-57565-744-8.
- —— (2015). Albert Starts School. Kane Press. ISBN 978-1-57565-743-1.
- —— (2015). Lost in the Mouseum. Kane Press. ISBN 978-1-57565-645-8.
- —— (2017). Albert Helps Out. Kane Press. ISBN 978-1-57565-857-5.
- —— (2017). Albert Doubles the Fun. Kane Press. ISBN 978-1-57565-834-6.
- —— (2017). Where's Albert?. Kane Press. ISBN 978-1-57565-855-1.
- —— (2017). Let's Go, Snow!. Kane Press. ISBN 978-1-57565-807-0.
- —— (2021). Who Needs It. Kane Press. ISBN 9781635927740.

=== As Nan Walker ===
- —— (2004). We Fish. Benchmark. ISBN 9788954922098.
- —— (2006). Stressbusters: Producers & Consumers. Kane Press. ISBN 9781575651859.
- —— (2006). Check It Out! Historical Evidence. Kane Press. ISBN 9781575651668.
- —— (2008). The Bay School Blogger. Kane Press. ISBN 9781306281935.
- —— (2008). Follow That Clue!. Kane Press. ISBN 9781575652740.
- —— (2009). The Yum Yum House. Kane Press. ISBN 9781575652900.
- —— (2009). The Messiest Room on the Planet. Kane Press. ISBN 9781575652825.
- —— (2010). Old School, New School. Benchmark Education Company. ISBN 9781616723675.
- —— (2010). Rain Forest Food. Benchmark Education Company. ISBN 9781616723729.
- —— (2011). Day Camp. Benchmark Education Company. ISBN 9781616723477.
- —— (2011). Thanksgiving Now and Then. Benchmark Education Company. ISBN 9781616723781.
- —— (2012). On the Acronym and Initialization Assembly Line. Benchmark Education Company. ISBN 9781450965484.
- —— (2012). Simile Ella. Benchmark Education Company. ISBN 9781450965323.
- —— (2014). Our Nature Chart. JY Books. ISBN 9788954922302.
- —— (2016). Spork Out of Orbit. Kane Press. ISBN 9781575658193.
- —— (2017). Otto and the New Girl. Kane Press. ISBN 9781575658643.
- —— (2017). The Midnight Kid. Kane Press. ISBN 9781575652382.
