= Sy Montgomery =

Naturalist, author and scriptwriter (born 1958)

- Born: February 7, 1958 (age 68); Frankfurt, Germany
- Education: Westfield High School (Westfield, New Jersey)
- Alma mater: Syracuse University
- Occupations: Naturalist, author and scriptwriter
- Spouse: Howard Mansfield
- Writing career
- Notable work: The Soul of an Octopus: A Surprising Exploration into the Wonder of Consciousness
- Notable awards: 2007 Orbis Pictus Award
- Website: Author's website

Sy Montgomery (born February 7, 1958) is an American naturalist, author, and scriptwriter who writes for children as well as adults.

== Biography ==
=== Early life and education ===
Montgomery was born on February 7, 1958, in Frankfurt, Germany, to Austin and Willa Montgomery. Her father was a brigadier general in the US Army; her mother was a pilot, who also worked for the FBI. As a child she lived in Frankfurt; Brooklyn, New York; Alexandria, Virginia; and Westfield, New Jersey. She is a 1975 graduate of Westfield High School and a 1979 graduate of Syracuse University, a triple major with dual degrees in magazine journalism from the S.I. Newhouse School of Public Communications and in French language and literature and in psychology from the College of Arts and Sciences. She has been awarded four honorary doctorate degrees: an honorary Doctorate of Humane Letters from Keene State College in 2004 and an honorary Doctorate of Humane Letters from both Franklin Pierce University and Southern New Hampshire University in 2011, and Lesley University.

=== Career ===
She is author of 38 books, including The Soul of an Octopus: A Surprising Exploration into the Wonder of Consciousness, which was a finalist for the 2015 National Book Award for Nonfiction and was on The New York Times Best Seller list. Her popular book The Good Good Pig is the international bestselling memoir of life with her pig, Christopher Hogwood. National best sellers listed on The New York Times Best Seller list include Of Time and Turtles, How To Be a Good Creature: A Memoir in 13 Animals, and Becoming a Good Creature (a picture book for children). Other notable titles include Journey of the Pink Dolphins, Spell of the Tiger, and Search for the Golden Moon Bear. Her book for children, Quest for the Tree Kangaroo: An Expedition to the Cloud Forest of New Guinea was the recipient of the 2007 Orbis Pictus Award and was selected as an Honor book for the Sibert Medal. Her book Kakapo Rescue: Saving The World's Strangest Parrot won the Sibert Medal in 2010. She is the winner of the 2009 New England Independent Booksellers Association Nonfiction Award, the 2010 Children's Book Guild Nonfiction Award, the Henry Bergh Award for Nonfiction (given by the ASPCA for Humane Education) and dozens of other honors.

For a half-hour National Geographic segment, she scripted and appeared in Spell of the Tiger, based on her book of the same title. Also for National Geographic, she developed and scripted Mother Bear Man based on the work of Ben Kilham, who raises and releases orphaned American black bears, which won a Chris Award.

Author Vicki Croke asked Sy what she has learned, not just about an animal's natural history, but lessons about life. Sy answered: "How to be a good creature. How do you be compassionate?… I think that animals teach compassion better than anything else and compassion doesn't necessarily just mean a little mouse with a sore foot and you try to fix it. It means getting yourself inside the mind and heart of someone else. Seeing someone's soul, looking for their truth. Animals teach you all of that and that's how you get compassion and heart."

=== Personal life ===
She lives in Hancock, New Hampshire, with her husband, writer Howard Mansfield.

== Awards and honors ==
- 2024 Cook Prize for The Book of Turtles
- 2021 Sarah Josepha Hale Award (to a New England author for "a distinguished body of work in the field of literature and Letters")
- 2021 Named a Literary Light by the Associates of the Boston Public Library
- 2019 Earthwatch International Travel fellowship to join the Tracking Wild Dogs expedition
- 2019 Winner of the John Burroughs Association Riverby Award for Magnificent Migrations: On Safari with African's Last Great Herds
- 2018 New York Times bestseller for How to Be a Good Creature
- 2017 Thoreau Prize, granted to "an accomplished writer who embodies the spirit of Thoreau"
- 2016 New England Independent Booksellers Association New England Book Award for Nonfiction
- 2016 American Association for the Advancement of Science / Subaru SB&F Winning Middle Grades Science Book
- 2015 National Book Award for Nonfiction finalist for The Soul of an Octopus
- New England Independent Booksellers Association, Nonfiction award (lifetime achievement)
- ASPCA Henry Bergh Award for Nonfiction (lifetime achievement)
- 2013 American Association for the Advancement of Science Science Book and Film Award for children's nonfiction, Temple Grandin: How the Woman Who Loved Cows Embraced Autism and Changed the World
- 2011 Sibert Medal winner for Kakapo Rescue: Saving The World's Strangest Parrot
- 2010 The Washington Post/Children's Book Guild Award for Nonfiction

== Selected works ==
=== For adults ===
- 1991, The Curious Naturalist: Nature's Everyday Mysteries
- 1995, Seasons of the Wild
- 1995, Spell of the Tiger: The Man-eaters of the Sunderbans
- 2000, Journey of the Pink Dolphins: An Amazon quest
- 2000, Walking with the Great Apes
- 2002, The Wild out Your Window
- 2002, Search for the Golden Moon Bear: Science and Adventure in Pursuit of a New Species
- 2006, The Good Good Pig: The Extraordinary Life of Christopher Hogwood
- 2010, Birdology
- 2015, The Soul of an Octopus: A Surprising Exploration into the Wonder of Consciousness
- 2018, How to Be a Good Creature: A Memoir in Thirteen Animals, illustrated by Rebecca Green (A New York Times bestseller)
- 2021, The Hummingbirds' Gift: Wonder, Beauty, and Renewal on Wings
- 2022, The Hawk's Way: Encounters with Fierce Beauty
- 2023, Of Time and Turtles: Mending the World, Shell by Shattered Shell
- 2024, Secrets of the Octopus
- 2024, What the Chicken Knows

=== For children ===
- 1999, The Snake Scientist
- 2001, The Man-Eating Tigers of Sundarbans
- 2002, Encantado: Pink Dolphin of the Amazon
- 2004, The Tarantula Scientist
- 2006, Quest for the Tree Kangaroo: An Expedition to the Cloud Forest of New Guinea
- 2009, Saving the Ghost of the Mountain: An Expedition among Snow Leopards in Mongolia
- 2010, Kakapo Rescue: Saving the World's Strangest Parrot
- 2012, Temple Grandin: How the Girl Who Loved Cows Embraced Autism and Changed the World
- 2013, Snowball the Dancing Cockatoo
- 2013, The Tapir Scientist: Saving South America's Largest Mammal
- 2014, Chasing Cheetahs: The Race to Save Africa's Fastest Cat
- 2015, The Octopus Scientists: Exploring the Mind of a Mollusk
- 2016, The Great White Shark Scientist
- 2017, Amazon Adventure
- 2018, The Hyena Scientist
- 2018, Inky's Amazing Escape: How a Very Smart Octopus Found His Way Home
- 2019, The Magnificent Migration: On Safari With Africa's last Great herds
- 2020, Becoming A Good Creature
- 2020, Condor Comeback
- 2022, The Seagull And The Sea Captain
- 2024, Brave Baby Hummingbird
