= Sibert Medal =

Children's literary award

- Awarded for: "the most distinguished informational book" for children
- Country: United States
- Presented by: Association for Library Service to Children, a division of the American Library Association
- First award: 2001
- Website: ala.org/alsc/awardsgrants/bookmedia/sibertmedal

The Robert F. Sibert Informational Book Medal established by the Association for Library Service to Children in 2001 with support from Bound to Stay Bound Books, Inc., is awarded annually to the writer and illustrator of the most distinguished informational book published in English during the preceding year. The award is named in honor of Robert F. Sibert, a long-time president of Bound to Stay Bound Books, Inc. in Jacksonville, Illinois. ALSC administers the award.

"Informational books are defined as those written and illustrated to present, organize, and interpret documentable, factual material." Poetry and traditional literature such as folktales are not eligible but there is no other restriction, such as reference books or nonfiction books. The book must be published originally or simultaneously in the United States and in English.

== Recipients ==
Robert F. Sibert Medal and Honor Books, 2001–present
Year	Writer	Illustrator	Title	Result	Ref.
2001	Marc Aronson	Marc Aronson	Sir Walter Ralegh and the Quest for El Dorado	Winner	
2001	Joan Dash	Dušan Petričić	The Longitude Prize	Honor	
2001	Jim Murphy	—	BLIZZARD! The Storm That Changed America	Honor	
2001	Sophie Webb	Sophie Webb	My Season with Penguins: An Antarctic Journal	Honor	
2001	Judd Winick	Judd Winick	Pedro and Me: Friendship, Loss, and What I Learned	Honor	
2002	Susan Campbell Bartoletti	—	Black Potatoes: The Story of the Great Irish Famine, 1845-1850	Winner	
2002	Andrea Warren	—	Surviving Hitler: A Boy in the Nazi Death Camps	Honor	
2002	Jan Greenberg and Sandra Jordan	—	Vincent van Gogh	Honor	
2002	Lynn Curlee	Lynn Curlee	Brooklyn Bridge	Honor	
2003	James Cross Giblin	—	The Life and Death of Adolf Hitler	Winner	
2003	Karen Blumenthal	—	Six Days in October: The Stock Market Crash of 1929	Honor	
2003	Jack Gantos	—	Hole in My Life	Honor	
2003	Jan Greenberg and Sandra Jordan	Robert Andrew Parker	Action Jackson	Honor	
2003	Pam Muñoz Ryan	Brian Selznick	When Marian Sang	Honor	
2004	Jim Murphy	—	An American Plague: The True and Terrifying Story of the Yellow Fever Epidemic of 1793	Winner	
2004	Vicki Cobb	Julia Gorton	I Face the Wind	Honor	
2005	Russell Freedman	—	The Voice that Challenged a Nation: Marian Anderson and the Struggle for Equal Rights	Winner	
2005	Barbara Kerley	Brian Selznick	Walt Whitman: Words for America	Honor	
2005	Sy Montgomery	Nic Bishop	The Tarantula Scientist	Honor	
2005	James Rumford	James Rumford	Sequoyah: The Cherokee Man Who Gave His People Writing	Honor	
2006	Sally M. Walker	—	Secrets of a Civil War Submarine: Solving the Mysteries of the H.L. Hunley	Winner	
2006	Susan Campbell Bartoletti	—	Hitler Youth: Growing Up in Hitler's Shadow	Honor	
2007	Catherine Thimmesh	—	Team Moon: How 400,000 People Landed Apollo 11 on the Moon	Winner	
2007	Ann Bausum	—	Freedom Riders: John Lewis and Jim Zwerg on the Front Lines of the Civil Rights Movement	Honor	
2007	Sy Montgomery	Nic Bishop	Quest for the Tree Kangaroo: An Expedition to the Cloud Forest of New Guinea	Honor	
2007	Siena Cherson Siegel	Mark Siegel	To Dance: A Ballerina’s Graphic Novel	Honor	
2008	Peter Sís	Peter Sís	The Wall: Growing Up Behind the Iron Curtain	Winner	
2008	Brian Floca	Brian Floca	Lightship	Honor	
2008	Nic Bishop	Nic Bishop	Nic Bishop Spiders	Honor	
2009	Kadir Nelson	Kadir Nelson	We Are the Ship: The Story of Negro League Baseball	Winner	
2009	James M. Deem	—	Bodies from the Ice: Melting Glaciers and the Recovery of the Past	Honor	
2009	Barbara Kerley	Edwin Fotheringham	What to Do About Alice?: How Alice Roosevelt Broke the Rules, Charmed the World, and Drove Her Father Teddy Crazy!	Honor	
2010	Tanya Lee Stone	—	Almost Astronauts: 13 Women Who Dared to Dream	Winner	
2010	Chris Barton	Tony Persiani	The Day-Glo Brothers: The True Story of Bob and Joe Switzer's Bright Ideas and Brand New Colors	Honor	
2010	Brian Floca	Brian Floca	Moonshot: The Flight Of Apollo 11	Honor	
2010	Phillip Hoose	—	Claudette Colvin: Twice Toward Justice	Honor	
2011	Sy Montgomery	Nic Bishop	Kakapo Rescue: Saving the World's Strangest Bird	Winner	
2011	Jan Greenberg and Sandra Johnson	Brian Floca	Ballet for Martha: Making Appalachian Spring	Honor	
2011	Russell Freedman	—	Lafayette and the American Revolution	Honor	
2012	Melissa Sweet	Melissa Sweet	Balloons Over Broadway: The True Story of the Puppeteer of Macy's Parade	Winner	
2012	Larry Dane Brimner	—	Black & White: The Confrontation between Reverend Fred L. Shuttlesworth and Eugene 'Bull' Connor	Honor	
2012	Allen Say	Allen Say	Drawing from Memory	Honor	
2012	Caitlin O'Connell and Donna M. Jackson	Caitlin O'Connell and Timothy Rodwell (Photographers)	The Elephant Scientist	Honor	
2012	Rosalyn Schanzer	Rosalyn Schanzer	Witches!: The Absolutely True Tale of Disaster in Salem	Honor	
2013	Steve Sheinkin	—	Bomb: The Race to Build—and Steal—the World's Most Dangerous Weapon	Winner	
2013	Robert Byrd	Robert Byrd	Electric Ben: The Amazing Life and Times of Benjamin Franklin	Honor	
2013	Phillip Hoose	—	Moonbird: A Year on the Wind with Great Survivor B95	Honor	
2013	Deborah Hopkinson	—	Titanic: Voices from the Disaster	Honor	
2014	Susan L. Roth and Cindy Trumbore	Susan L. Roth	Parrots over Puerto Rico	Winner	
2014	Jen Bryant	Melissa Sweet	A Splash of Red: The Life and Art of Horace Pippin	Honor	
2014	Annette LeBlanc Cate	Annette LeBlanc Cate	Look Up! Bird-Watching in Your Own Backyard	Honor	
2014	Brian Floca	Brian Floca	Locomotive	Honor	
2014	Jan Greenberg and Sandra Jordan	—	The Mad Potter: George E. Ohr, Eccentric Genius	Honor	
2015	Jen Bryant	Melissa Sweet	The Right Word: Roget and His Thesaurus	Winner	
2015	Candace Fleming	—	The Family Romanov: Murder, Rebellion & the Fall of Imperial Russia	Honor	
2015	Patricia Hruby Powell	Christian Robinson	Josephine: The Dazzling Life of Josephine Baker	Honor	
2015	Katherine Roy	Katherine Roy	Neighborhood Sharks: Hunting with the Great Whites of California's Farallon Islands	Honor	
2015	Duncan Tonatiuh	Duncan Tonatiuh	Separate Is Never Equal: Sylvia Mendez & Her Family's Fight for Desegregation	Honor	
2015	Jacqueline Woodson	—	Brown Girl Dreaming	Honor	
2016	Duncan Tonatiuh	Duncan Tonatiuh	Funny Bones: Posada and His Day of the Dead Calaveras	Winner	
2016	Don Brown	Don Brown	Drowned City: Hurricane Katrina and New Orleans	Honor	
2016	Phillip Hoose	—	The Boys Who Challenged Hitler: Knud Pedersen and the Churchill Club	Honor	
2016	Lynda Blackmon Lowery, as told to Elspeth Leacock and Susan Buckley	PJ Loughran	Turning 15 on the Road to Freedom: My Story of the 1965 Selma Voting Rights March	Honor	
2016	Carole Boston Weatherford	Ekua Holmes	Voice of Freedom: Fannie Lou Hamer, Spirit of the Civil Rights Movement	Honor	
2017	John Lewis and Andrew Aydin	Nate Powell	March: Book Three	Winner	
2017	Candace Fleming	Eric Rohmann	Giant Squid	Honor	
2017	Caren Stelson	—	Sachiko: A Nagasaki Bomb Survivor’s Story	Honor	
2017	Albert Marrin	—	The Japanese American Experience During World War II	Honor	
2017	Russell Freedman	—	We Will Not Be Silent: The White Rose Student Resistance Movement That Defied Adolf Hitler	Honor	
2018	Larry Dane Brimner	—	Twelve Days in May: Freedom Ride 1961	Winner	
2018	Jacqueline Briggs Martin and June Jo Lee	Man One	Chef Roy Choi and the Street Food Remix	Honor	
2018	Jason Chin	Jason Chin	Grand Canyon	Honor	
2018	Shane Burcaw	Matt Carr	Not So Different: What You Really Want to Ask about Having a Disability	Honor	
2018	Patricia Newman	—	Sea Otter Heroes: The Predators That Saved an Ecosystem	Honor	
2019	Joyce Sidman	—	The Girl Who Drew Butterflies: How Maria Merian's Art Changed Science	Winner	
2019	Catherine Thimmesh	—	Camp Panda: Helping Cubs Return to the Wild	Honor	
2019	Gail Jarrow	—	Spooked!: How a Radio Broadcast and The War of the Worlds Sparked the 1938 Invasion of America	Honor	
2019	Don Brown	Don Brown	The Unwanted: Stories of the Syrian Refugees	Honor	
2019	Traci Sorell	Frané Lessac	We Are Grateful: Otsaliheliga	Honor	
2019	Michael Mahin	Jose Ramirez	When Angels Sing: The Story of Rock Legend Carlos Santana	Honor	
2020	Kevin Noble Maillard	Juana Martinez-Neal	Fry Bread: A Native American Family Story	Winner	
2020	Lori Alexander	Vivien Mildenberger	All in a Drop: How Antony van Leeuwenhoek Discovered an Invisible World	Honor	
2020	Jo Ann Alice Boyce and Debbie Levy	—	This Promise of Change: One Girl's Story in the Fight for School Equality	Honor	
2020	Nikki Grimes	—	Ordinary Hazards: A Memoir	Honor	
2020	Antoinette Portis	Antoinette Portis	Hey, Water!	Honor	
2021	Candace Fleming	Eric Rohmann	Honeybee: The Busy Life of Apis Mellifera	Winner	
2021	John Rocco	John Rocco	How We Got to the Moon: The People, Technology, and Daring Feats of Science Behind Humanity's Greatest Adventure	Honor	
2021	Suzanne Slade	Cozbi A. Cabrera	Exquisite: The Poetry and Life of Gwendolyn Brooks	Honor	
2021	Christina Soontornvat	—	All Thirteen: The Incredible Cave Rescue of the Thai Boys' Soccer Team	Honor	
2022	Cynthia Levinson	Evan Turk	The People's Painter: How Ben Shahn Fought for Justice With Art	Winner	
2022	Colleen Paeff	Nancy Carpenter	The Great Stink: How Joseph Bazalgette Solved London’s Poop Pollution Problem	Honor	
2022	Steve Sheinkin	—	Fallout: Spies, Superbombs, and the Ultimate Cold War Showdown	Honor	
2022	Traci Sorell	Frané Lessac	We Are Still Here!: Native American Truths Everyone Should Know	Honor	
2022	Melissa Stewart	Sarah S. Brannen	Summertime Sleepers: Animals That Estivate	Honor	
2022	Carole Boston Weatherford	Floyd Cooper	Unspeakable: The Tulsa Race Massacre	Honor	
2023	Elizabeth Partridge	Lauren Tamaki	Seen and Unseen: What Dorothea Lange, Toyo Miyatake, and Ansel Adams’s Photographs Reveal About the Japanese American Incarceration	Winner	
2023	Angela Joy	Janelle Washington	Choosing Brave: How Mamie Till-Mobley and Emmett Till Sparked the Civil Rights Movement	Honor	
2023	Antoinette Portis	Antoinette Portis	A Seed Grows	Honor	
2023	Mara Rockliff	R. Gregory Christie	Sweet Justice: Georgia Gilmore and the Montgomery Bus Boycott	Honor	
2023	Chana Stiefel	Susan Gal	The Tower of Life: How Yaffa Eliach Rebuilt Her Town in Stories and Photographs	Honor	
2024	Nicholas Day	Brett Helquist	The Mona Lisa Vanishes: A Legendary Painter, a Shocking Heist, and the Birth of a Global Celebrity	Winner	
2024	Sy Montgomery	Matt Patterson	The Book of Turtles	Honor	
2024	Traci N. Todd	Shannon Wright	Holding Her Own: The Exceptional Life of Jackie Ormes	Honor	
2024	Jessica Lanan	Jessica Lanan	Jumper: A Day in the Life of the Backyard Jumping Spider	Honor	
2024	Martin W. Sandler	—	Shipwrecked!: Diving for Hidden Time Capsules on the Ocean Floor	Honor	
2025	Lynn Brunelle	Jason Chin	Life after Whale: The Amazing Ecosystem of a Whale Fall	Winner	
2025	Nathalie Alonso	Rudy Gutierrez	Call Me Roberto!: Roberto Clemente Goes to Bat for Latinos	Honor	
2025	Candace Fleming	—	The Enigma Girls: How Ten Teenagers Broke Ciphers, Kept Secrets, and Helped Win World War II	Honor	
2025	Estelle Nadel, Sammy Savos, and Bethany Strout	Sammy Savos	The Girl Who Sang: A Holocaust Memoir of Hope and Survival	Honor	
2025	Billy Mills and Donna Janell Bowman	S. D. Nelson	Wings of an Eagle: The Gold Medal Dreams of Billy Mills	Honor	
2026	Sara Andrea Fajardo	Juana Martinez-Neal	Alberto Salas Plays Paka Paka con la Papa	Winner	
2026	Erin Entrada Kelly	—	At Last She Stood: How Joey Guerrero Spied, Survived, and Fought for Freedom	Honor	
2026	Quartez Harris	Gordon C. James	Go Tell It: How James Baldwin Became a Writer	Honor	
2026	Nikkolas Smith	Nikkolas Smith	The History of We	Honor	
2026	Pablo Leon	Pablo Leon	Silenced Voices: Reclaiming Memories from the Guatemalan Genocide	Honor	
2026	Nicholas Day	Yas Imamura	A World Without Summer: A Volcano Erupts, A Creature Awakens, and the Sun Goes Out	Honor	
