= Dan Santat =

American children's illustrator and writer (born 1975)

- Santat at the 2026 National Book Fair
- Born: 1975 (age 50–51); Brooklyn, New York, U.S.
- Occupations: Screenwriter, author, illustrator
- Writing career
- Genre: Children's literature
- Notable awards: Caldecott Medal, National Book Award
- Website: dansantatbooks.com

Dan Santat (born 1975) is an American screenwriter, author and illustrator known for his children's book The Adventures of Beekle: The Unimaginary Friend, which won the 2015 Caldecott Medal for distinguished illustration. He also wrote The Guild of Geniuses and created the Disney Channel animated series The Replacements. He was awarded the 2023 National Book Award for Young People's Literature for A First Time for Everything.

== Biography ==
Santat was born in 1975 to Thai immigrants in Brooklyn before moving to California when Santat was three. After attending high school at Adolfo Camarillo High School, Santat graduated from the University of California at San Diego with a bachelor's degree in microbiology. Santat then attended the Art Center College of Design, graduating with distinction in 2001. While there he became friends with illustrator Peter Brown.

Santat also worked as an environment artist for the video game company Activision for a series of Spider-Man games.

Santat's first children's book, The Guild of Geniuses, was published in 2004 by Arthur A Levine books. He followed that up illustrating the first Nanny Piggins book written by R. A. Spratt, and the first Otto Undercover book series written by Rhea Perlman. Since then he has illustrated for other authors, including Dan Gutman (The Christmas Genie), Barbara Jean Hicks (The Secret Life of Walter Kitty), and Anne Isaacs (The Ghosts of Luckless Gulch).

In 2005, Santat created the show The Replacements for Disney Channel. Based on a children's book idea he was going to write, the show premiered in July 2006. Santat has spoken of his admiration of those who can do the drawing necessary for animation. He spoke of the challenges of working on The Replacements, "Working creatively with a large corporation and numerous executives was rather frustrating because there was a feeling that there was a process of homogenization to try to appeal to as many kids as possible" and says he prefers the freedom of illustrative styles afforded by book editors.

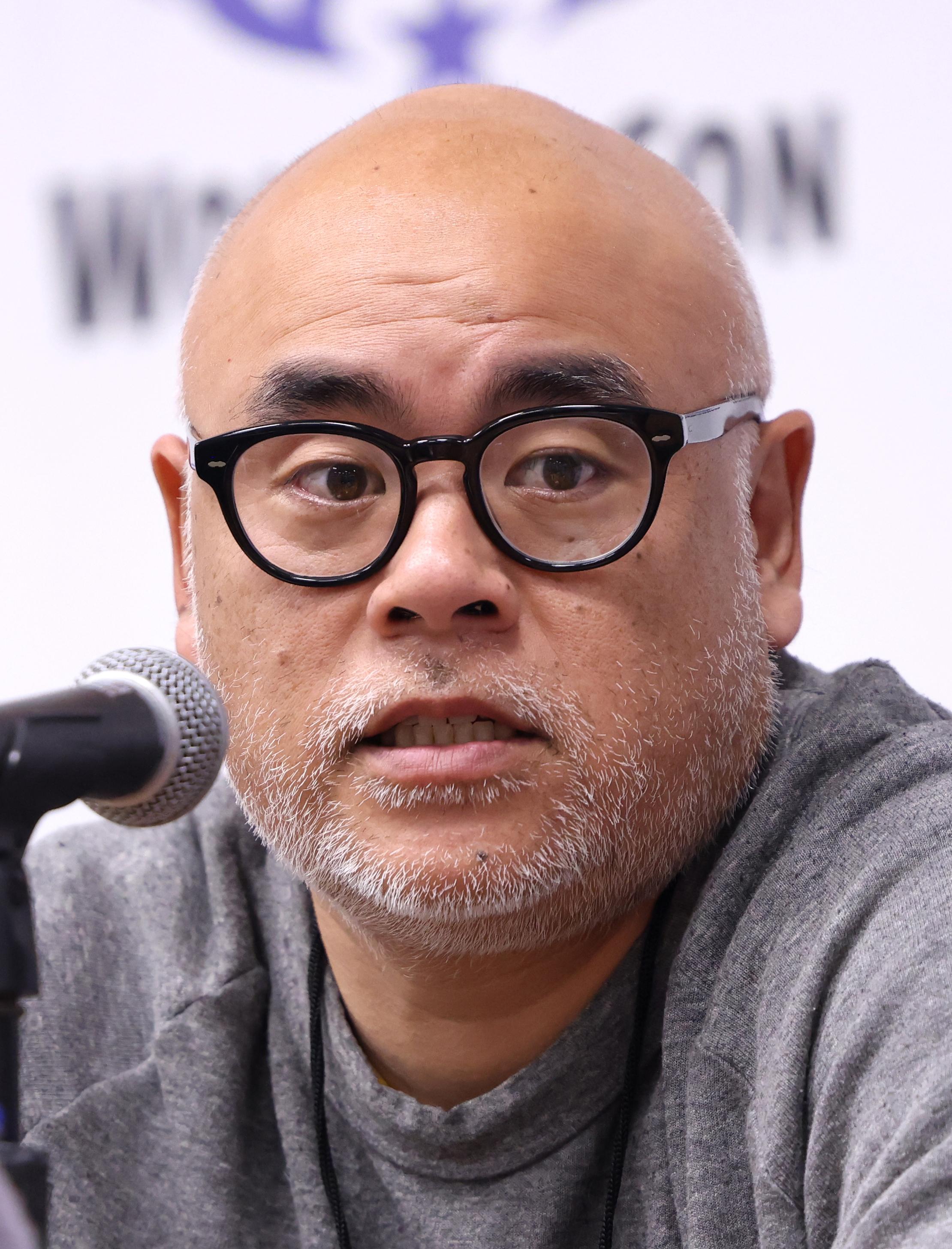
Dan Santat at the 2024 WonderCon in Anaheim, California.

Santat is also a commercial illustrator, with such clients as The Wall Street Journal, Esquire, Village Voice, GQ Russia, Macworld, Macy's, and many others. His work has also appeared at gallery shows - including the I Am 8 Bit art show in 2006, 2007, and 2008. In 2010 he turned down the opportunity to create Google Doodles not wanting to abandon his dream of making children's books.

Santat has completed illustrations for over 60 books, 14 of which were published in 2014 alone.

== Personal life ==
Santat lives in Southern California with his wife, Leah (a lab manager and technician at Caltech), his sons Alek and Kyle, a bird, three dogs, and two cats. His family name is originally "Santatevongchai" (Thai: สันตติวงศ์ไชย; RTGS: Santatiwongchai) and it was granted to his great-grandfather from the king of Thailand. His family name was later shortened to "Santat" after his parents immigrated to the United States.

== Select bibliography ==
=== Author ===
- The Guild of Geniuses (2004)
- Sidekicks (2011)
- The Adventures of Beekle: The Unimaginary Friend (2014)
- Are We There Yet? (2016)
- After the Fall: How Humpty Dumpty Got Back Up Again (2017)
- The Aquanaut (2022)
- A First Time for Everything (2023)
- A Fishboy Named...Sashimi (2026)

=== Illustrator ===
- Crankenstein (2013) & A Crankenstein Valentine (2014) written by Samantha Berger
- Ricky Ricotta's Mighty Robot (2014–2016) (redrawn book series written by Dav Pilkey)
- Drawn Together (2018) written by Minh Lê
- The Little Engine That Could (90th anniversary edition, 2020) written by Watty Piper
- Endlessly Ever After (2022) written by Laurel Snyder
