= City of Light, City of Dark =

Comic book novel written by Avi

City Of Light, City Of Dark
- Cover art for City Of Light, City Of Dark; Art by Brian Floca
- Author: Avi
- Illustrator: Brian Floca
- Language: English & Spanish
- Genre: Fantasy, Parallel Universe
- Publisher: Scholastic
- Publication date: 1993
- Media type: Print (Hardcover & Paperback)
- ISBN: 0-531-07058-1 (Paperback edition)
- OCLC: 57217749

City Of Light, City Of Dark is a comic book novel written by Newbery Medal-winning author Avi, and was the first book ever to be illustrated by Brian Floca. Additional Spanish translations were done by Jose Aranda and Anthony Trujillo. The book's title is probably inspired by the summer and winter solstices, the "lightest" and "darkest" days of the year. These two days also mark two pivotal events in the Kurbs' "ritual cycle of acknowledgment". Alternatively, since the story is set in New York, "City Of Light" could refer to one of the many cities of light.

== Plot synopsis ==
An enigmatic race of beings known as the Kurbs are introduced at the story's outset. Except as serpentine extensions of shadow, they are rarely seen, and thrive only in darkness. Utilizing something called the Power, they are able to control the rhythm of day and night. When humans first arrived on Manhattan Island, a place of apparent significance to the Kurbs, a treaty was signed: the Ritual Cycle of Acknowledgment. The Kurbs would loan the island out for human use, and even share their source of power. But in exchange, in synchronization with the summer and winter solstices, the source of Power would be ritualistically hidden somewhere on the island, and if it was not found in time, the Kurbs would reclaim the island, and everything would freeze. Over the years, the Power was hidden inside different objects, including an ear of corn, a musket ball, an oil lamp and, most recently, a subway token. A lineage of women were given the responsibility of carrying out the Ritual Cycle Of Acknowledgment, and were granted special powers through the Kurbs' source of Power, as well.

The system works for centuries without incident until evil Mr. Underton tried to steal the Power a few years back, and lost his eyesight. Now he is close to stealing it once again, and if he succeeds, the Kurbs will take back the City, reducing it to a dark and frozen tundra. It is up to two kids named Carlos and Sarah to both stop Mr. Underton from obtaining the subway token with the Power and use it to keep the City safe. However, Sarah's secrets that are entwined with the token. What ensues is a race against darkness. A race against the lies of the past and a race against time.

== Style ==
City Of Light, City Of Dark is both a comic book and a novel. It begins like an illustrated storybook: paragraphs of text are accompanied by frequent illustrations, establishing the backstory more quickly than would have been possible with sequential art alone. Comic book panels tell the rest of the story, occasionally helped along by the author's narrations, which are presented in the form of captions. This method of storytelling makes City Of Light, City Of Dark unique. Brian Floca's Franco-Belgian-inspired art style and frequent cross-hatching also give this modern fantasy an appropriately contemporary feel.

== Controversy ==
The book was banned in October 2022 in the Frisco Independent School District of Texas.
