= Watercress (book) =

2021 children's book by Andrea Wang

- Author: Andrea Wang
- Illustrator: Jason Chin
- Cover artist: Chin
- Language: English
- Genre: Picture book
- Publisher: Neal Porter Books
- Publication date: March 30, 2021
- Publication place: United States
- Media type: Hardcover
- Pages: 32
- ISBN: 9780823446247

Watercress is a children's book written by Andrea Wang, illustrated by Jason Chin, and published on March 30, 2021 by Neal Porter Books.

In 2022, the book won the Asian/Pacific American Award for Literature for Picture Book, Caldecott Medal, and Newbery Honor.

== Synopsis ==
A young girl is in the car with her brother and parents when they come across wild watercress growing on the side of the road. Her parents excitedly pull over and instruct the children to help them gather the watercress. The girl feels embarrassed to be seen by passing cars and disgusted by the mud and snails that are on the plants. The watercress is prepared for dinner that night, but the girl initially refuses to eat it because she is ashamed of their "dinner from a ditch". Her mother brings out a picture from her childhood and, for the first time, talks about the famine that her family suffered. Feeling guilty, the girl takes a bite of the watercress. She discovers that she likes the taste and reflects on the new memory she and her family have created.

== Reception ==
Watercress is a Junior Library Guild book. It was met with critical acclaim, including starred reviews from Kirkus Reviews, Publishers Weekly, School Library Journal, and Shelf Awareness.

Kirkus Reviews called the book "[u]nderstated, deep, and heart-rending." Writing for School Library Journal, Elissa Cooper called Watercress "[a] powerful story sure to awaken empathy and curiosity." Publishers Weekly said it was "[a]n adept gem of a picture book, encompassing both universal intergenerational embarrassment and a specific diasporic shift in cultural perception."

Watercress was named one of the best children's books of 2021 by BookPage, The Boston Globe, Chicago Public Library, The Horn Book, Kirkus Reviews, The New York Public Library, The New York Times, Publishers Weekly, School Library Journal, Shelf Awareness, The Wall Street Journal, and The Washington Post. Center for the Study of Multicultural Children's Literature also included it in their list of the year's best multicultural children's books. In 2022, Weston Woods Studios released an animated film based on the book, narrated by Sunny Lu.

== Accolades ==
Year	Award/Honor	Result	Ref.
2021	Boston Globe-Horn Book Award for Picture Book	Honor	
2021	New England Book Award for Children's	Winner	
2022	Asian/Pacific American Award for Literature for Picture Book	Winner	
2022	Caldecott Medal	Winner	
2022	Newbery Medal	Honor	

Awards
Preceded by We Are Water Protectors	Caldecott Medal recipient 2022	Succeeded by Hot Dog
