= Larry Dane Brimner =

American writer (born 1949)

Larry Dane Brimner (born November 5, 1949) is an American teacher, presenter, and writer of more than 150 children's books. They have ranged from fantasy-style stories for young children to non-fiction books for older children. Many of his books have civil rights themes; his book We Are One: The Story of Bayard Rustin won the 2008 Jane Addams Children's Book Award in the "older children" category. This was followed by Birmingham Sunday, which received the Orbis Pictus Honor Book Award in 2011 from the National Council for Teachers of English and the Eureka! Gold Award from the California Reading Association. His 2011 title, Black & White: The Confrontation between Reverend Fred L. Shuttlesworth and Eugene "Bull" Connor, was given the Carter G. Woodson Book Award (The National Council for the Social Studies) and named a Robert F. Sibert Honor Book (The Association for Library Service to Children/American Librarian Association). More recently, Brimner has started writing about the migrant children he once taught with the publication of STRIKE! The Farm Workers' Fight for Their Rights (Calkins Creek Books), which received a starred review in Kirkus Reviews.

== Background ==
Brimner was born in St. Petersburg, Florida. His father was a military officer and Brimner spent much of his childhood on Kodiak Island in Alaska. There was no television and only sporadic radio, and so his parents read to him often. By the age of four, he was living in a rural suburb of San Diego, California, where his father had been reassigned. Brimner attended San Diego State University, graduating in 1971 with a B.A. in British Literature. He earned an M.A. degree from San Diego State University in 1981. From 1974 to 1984, he was a writing and composition teacher at El Centro Union High School in El Centro, California, a desert farming community east of San Diego. He then went on to lecture at San Diego State University from 1984 to 1992 in the College of Education while pursuing a doctorate degree, before turning his attention to writing full-time. He has been a full-time freelance writer since 1985. He often visits schools to encourage and motivate young people to write. He has been a visiting author or an author-in-residence at schools on three continents. He also speaks at education and writing conferences.

== Published work ==
Brimner has won many awards for his writing, including the Teachers' Choice Award, Eureka! Silver Award, the Jane Addams Honor Book Award, the Norman A. Sugarman Award and Honor for Biography (Cleveland Public Library), Best Book for the Teen Age (New York Public Library), Best Children's Books of the Year List (Bank Street College), Junior Library Guild Selection, and others.

While in college, Brimner discovered that he was gay. He was unable to find objective information about gay issues, and under pressure from his parents, he went to a psychiatrist and underwent electroshock treatments. These experiences led to his 1995 book for gay and lesbian teenagers, Being Different, which he did as a favor to his editor, E. Russell Primm.

As of 2014, Cats!, an early-reader he did for Children's Press/Scholastic Library, has sold more than 300,000 copies and is still in print. Although Brimner enjoys the picture book format, it is his nonfiction, especially his social justice nonfiction, for which he is known.

In 2018, his book Twelve Days in May: Freedom Ride 1961 won the Sibert Medal.

Brimner lives in San Diego, California, but keeps a small writing studio in Tucson, Arizona.
