= A First Time for Everything =

2023 novel by Dan Santat

- Author: Dan Santat
- Publisher: First Second Books
- Publication date: February 28, 2023
- Pages: 320
- Award: National Book Award for Young People's Literature (2023)
- ISBN: 9781626724150

A First Time for Everything is a 2023 middle-grade graphic memoir written and illustrated by American author Dan Santat. It won the 2023 National Book Award for Young People's Literature.

== Summary ==
A First Time for Everything takes place in 1989 and follows 13-year-old Dan Santat whose experiences with middle school have been mostly negative. He's been bullied by his peers at school, and at home, his mother's lupus has strained his family. Despite this, Santat's parents insist he takes a school-sponsored, three-week trip through six European countries. During the trip, Santat experiences many firsts. He also begins to take his art seriously and shares it with others without the fear of being bullied.

== Reception ==
A First Time for Everything was well received by critics, including starred reviews from Booklist, Kirkus Reviews, Publishers Weekly, School Library Journal, and Shelf Awareness.

On behalf of Booklist, Jesse Karp highlighted how the book's opening sequence is "sure to engender instant empathy in any middle-school reader". Karp concluded by calling it "a great read among a crowded field, especially for sensitive middle-grade boys".

Kirkus highlighted how the book is "full of laughter and sentiment" and encourages "readers to dare to try new things". Similarly, School Library Journal'sGretchen Hardin called the novel "thoughtful [...] with lots of humor and heart".

Publishers Weekly took note of the illustrations: "Interstitials in a simplified color palette flash back to prior school humiliations, while exuberant full-color panels in Santat’s signature style convey the trip, including the dreamy reality of early freedoms, the nervous comedy of teen antics, and the wonder of viewing 'things I’d only seen on postcards, in textbooks, and in movies.'" Touching on the larger message of the book, they added, "As Santat finds friends and a way of being himself, what slowly emerges is one person’s hope in and relief at experiencing the world as a bigger place, finding a space in it, and realizing that both adults and peers are rooting for him."

Discussing both Santat's writing and illustrating, Shelf Awareness's Jen Forbus wrote, "Santat's authentic voice and realistic characters will likely take older readers back to their own middle school days while reminding current middle school-age readers of their own teen angst. Santat's splendidly expressive digital illustrations cement those emotional connections and highlight the humor even in the most agonizing of moments. He unpacks his transformational experience with vulnerability and raw honesty--the sincerity is heartening and the outcome inspiring."

== Awards and honors ==
A First Time for Everything won the 2023 National Book Award for Young People's Literature.
