= Caitlin O'Connell-Rodwell =

American conservation biologist and author

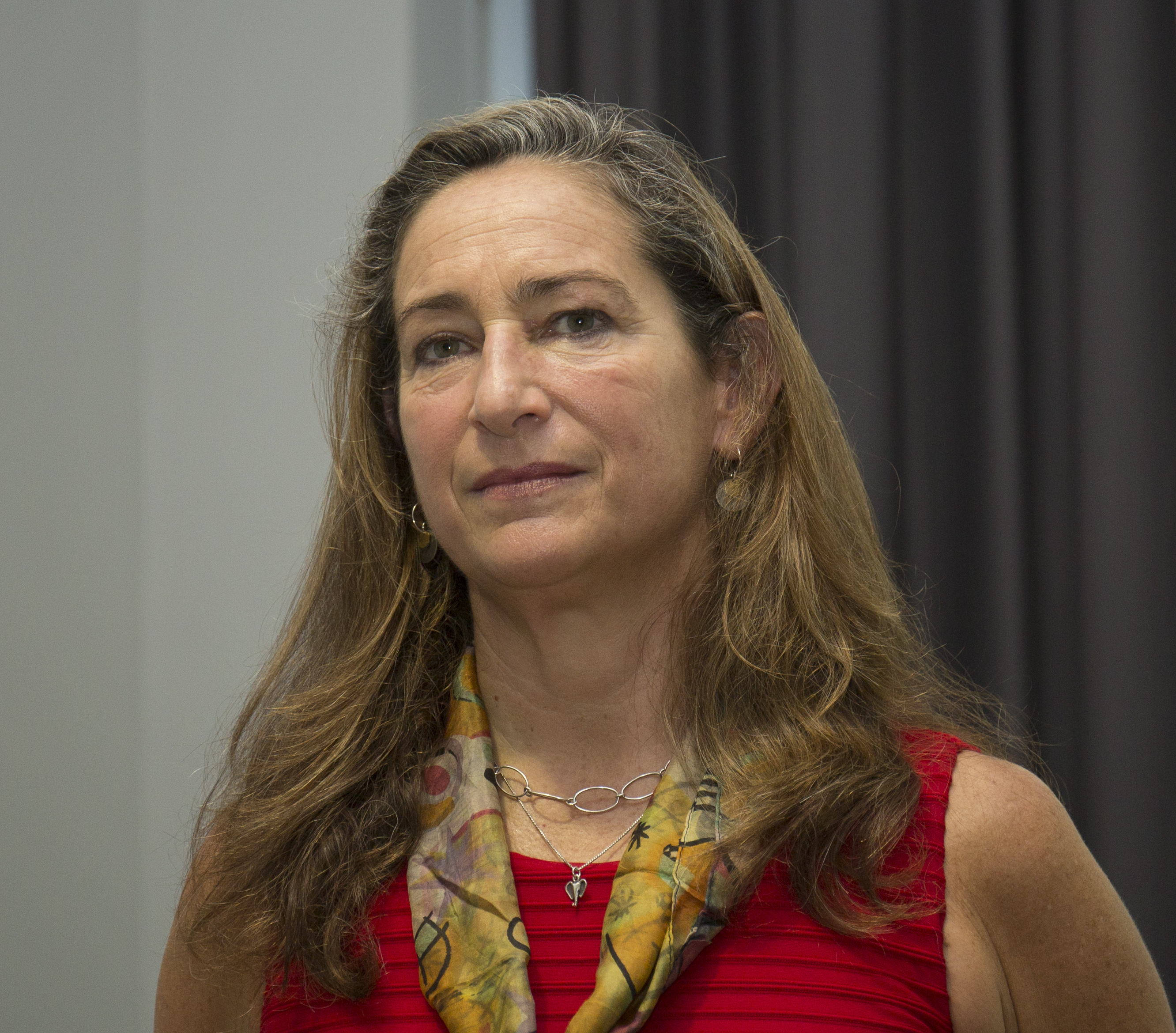
- O'Connell-Rodwell in 2018
- Born: 1965 (age 60–61)
- Occupation: Conservation biologist

Caitlin Elizabeth O'Connell-Rodwell (born 1965) is an American conservation biologist and author. She is an instructor at Harvard Medical School, scientific consultant, co-founder and chief executive officer of Utopia Scientific, and an expert on elephants. Her elephant research was the subject of the Elephant King, an award-winning Smithsonian Channel documentary.

== Education and career ==
Caitlin O’Connell received her B.Sc. in biology at Fairfield University in 1987 with a minor in French and art history and in 1991 her M.Sc. at the University of Hawaii at Manoa in ecology, evolution and conservation biology, involving research on seismo-acoustic communication of planthoppers.

In the course of three-year government contract involving efforts to mitigate conflicts between farmers and African elephant, she observed that also the elephants performed seismo-acoustic communication. Based on five years of experiments with captive elephants in the United States, Zimbabwe and India, she earned her Ph.D. in ecology at the University of California, Davis in 2000. She has subsequently worked at Stanford University Medical School as a postdoctoral fellow, professor of creative science writing, and instructor at its Department of Otolaryngology.

In October 2002, together with Timothy Rodwell, she founded Utopia Scientific, a non-profit corporation in San Diego that is dedicated to science and public health education. In spring 2013 she joined Georgia College as the inaugural Martha Daniel Newell Visiting Distinguished Scholar.

O'Connell's work has focused on elephant communication and elephant societies. At Stanford's Department of Otolaryngology, she investigated the possibility of developing a vibrotactile hearing aid inspired by her studies of the elephant vibrotactile sense, including the hearing-impaired and the profoundly deaf. Currently, she is funded by a National Institutes of Health grant to investigate the elephant middle ear and bone conduction hearing in relation to human hearing and bone conduction hearing aids (For related approaches, see: Sensory substitution.)

== Awards ==
In October 2007 she was awarded the Distinguished Young Alumna Award of the University of California, Davis.

The book The elephant scientist, which she wrote together with Donna M. Jackson and for which she and her husband Timothy C. Rodwell provided the photographs, received the Sibert Medal in 2012.

She received the Outstanding Science Trade Book award 2012 and the Junior Library Guild Selection 2011.

== Publications ==
Caitlin O'Connell(-Rodwell) is author of numerous peer-reviewed articles and several popular science books.

Academic books:

- The Use of Vibrations in Communication: properties, mechanisms and function across taxa, Research Signpost, 2010, ISBN 978-8178954516.

Popular science books:

- Wild Rituals, Chronicle Prism, San Francisco, 2021
- Elephant don: the politics of a pachyderm posse, University of Chicago Press, Chicago, 2015
- with Timothy C. Rodwell: A baby elephant in the wild, Houghton Mifflin Harcourt Publishing Company, New York, 2014
- with Timothy C. Rodwell: An elephant's life: an intimate portrait from Africa, Lyons Press, 2012
- with Donna M. Jackson and Timothy C. Rodwell: The elephant scientist, Houghton Mifflin Books for Children, 2011
- The elephant's secret sense : the hidden life of the wild herds of Africa, Free Press, New York, 2007

She has published numerous contributions in the media, among others in Scientific American, National Geographic magazine, National Geographic Channel, Africa Geographic magazine, Discovery Channel, Discover Magazine, Science News, Fox Channel, BBC Online, The Writer and Smithsonian magazine.
