= Most Dangerous =

2015 children's non-fiction book

Most Dangerous: Daniel Ellsberg and the Secret History of the Vietnam War
- Author: Steve Sheinkin
- Language: English
- Publisher: Roaring Brook Press
- Publication date: September 22, 2015
- Publication place: United States
- Pages: 384
- ISBN: 9781596439528
- Website: http://stevesheinkin.com/books/most-dangerous/

Most Dangerous: Daniel Ellsberg and the Secret History of the Vietnam War is a 2015 non-fiction book, aimed for young adolescent readers, written by Steve Sheinkin and published through Roaring Brook Press. The multi-award-winning book tells the story of Daniel Ellsberg's role in the Vietnam War and the Pentagon Papers.

== Overview ==
The book begins by telling the reader about how two members of The Plumbers are preparing to break into the office of a psychiatrist named Lewis J. Fielding, in an attempt to dig up dirt on his former client, Daniel Ellsberg, and hopefully ruin his reputation. Like a few other books by Sheinkin, it then backtracks many years, telling the reader why the government would be inclined to do such a thing. The book explains how Ellsberg got a job at the RAND Corporation, how he left to work at The Pentagon, how the Pentagon Papers were created, how Ellsberg became an anti-war advocate, and how Ellsberg accessed and released the Pentagon Papers. It often veers off Ellsberg, and tells the reader what was happening in the White House before and during the Vietnam War. The book closes off with the court cases involving the printing of the Pentagon Papers in the New York Times and Washington Post, and the case in which Ellsberg was tried for violating the Espionage Act of 1917.

== Reception ==
Reviews of the book were overwhelmingly positive. In a starred review, Booklist says that "Sheinkin offers a fascinating portrait" of Ellsberg. They add that it is both "thorough and challenging" and "powerful and thought-provoking." Publishers Weekly starts off its starred review by saying that "Sheinkin...has done again what he does so well: condense mountains of research into a concise, accessible, and riveting account of history," that "read[s] like the stuff of spy novels and will keep readers racing forward." A starred Kirkus Reviews review calls it "Lively, detailed" and "fully documented" before proclaiming the book to be "Easily the best study of the Vietnam War available for teen readers." Its fourth starred review, given by VOYA, calls it "Fast-paced and fascinating" and "backed up by meticulous research." Another starred review was handed out by School Library Journal, stating that the book is "Thoroughly researched...and beautifully written." The Horn Book slaps down a sixth star, and says the book is so good, Sheinkin "has outdone even himself." The stars continue with one from Bulletin of the Center for Children's Books, which calls Most Dangerous a "thrilling ride." The Washington Post declined to give a star, but did inform their readers that Most Dangerous is "Sheinkin's most compelling yet." The New York Times followed suit in the lack of a star, but did call the book "gripping". It then noted that "the author has a perfect ear for what might hold the attention of young readers" and it will "help them understand" why the world has become a place of "endless war and all-pervasive surveillance is a matter of course."

== Awards ==
- 2016 YALSA Award for Excellence in Nonfiction winner
- A 2015 National Book Award finalist
- A 2015 Bulletin of the Center for Children's Books Blue Ribbon book
- A 2015 Los Angeles Times Book Prize for Young Adult Literature finalist
- Selected for the 2016 Notable Social Studies Trade Books for Young People List
