= Brian Floca =

American illustrator and writer

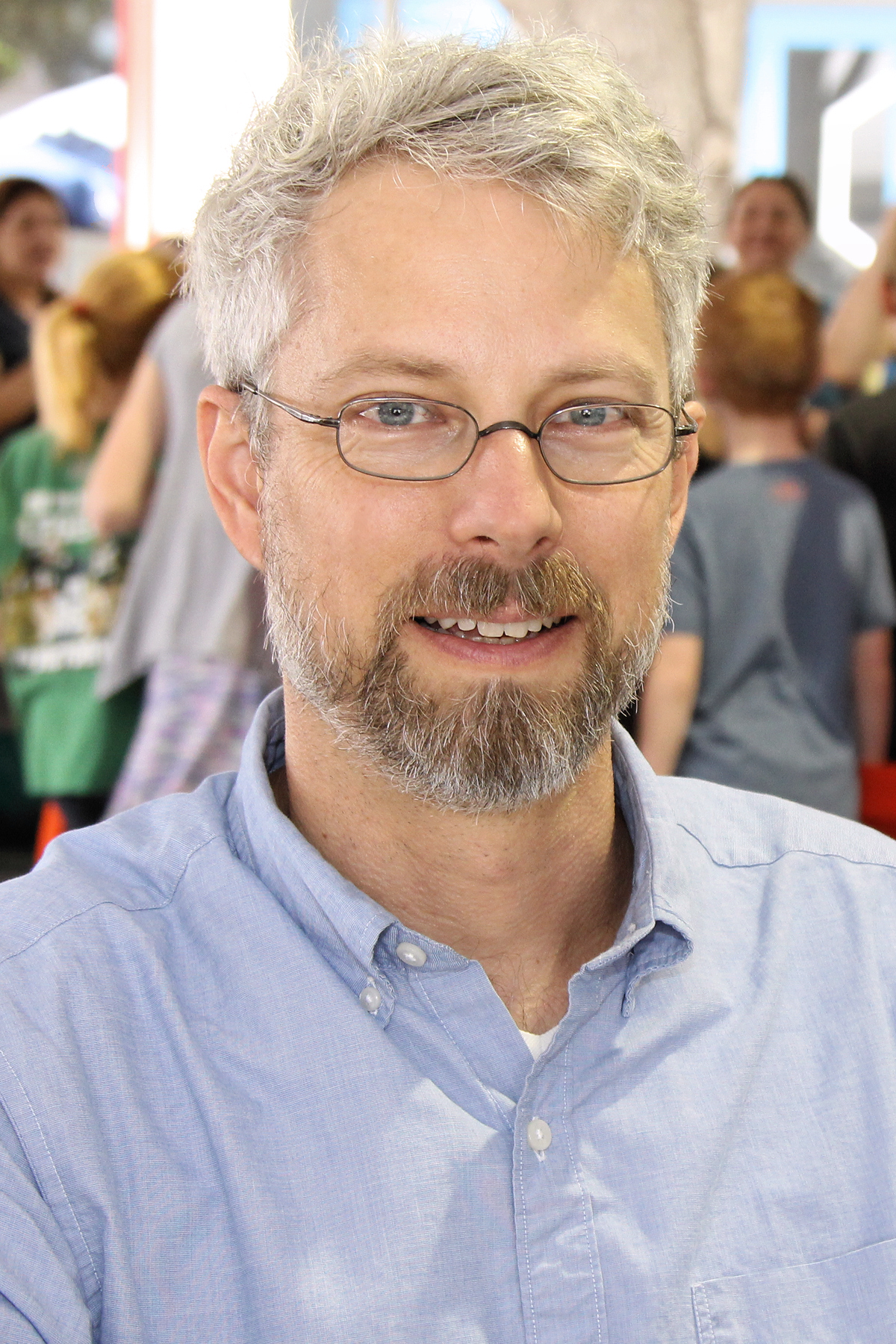
- Floca at the 2017 Texas Book Festival
- Born: Brian Kane Floca; January 11, 1969 (age 57); Temple, Texas, U.S.
- Occupations: Illustrator, writer
- Writing career
- Genres: Children's literature, picture books
- Notable awards: Caldecott Medal
- Website: www.brianfloca.com

Brian Kane Floca (born January 11, 1969) is an American writer and illustrator of children's books. He is best known for illustrating books written by Avi and for nonfiction picture books. In 2014, he won the Caldecott Medal for his book, Locomotive, as well as the Robert F. Sibert Informational Book Award Honor.

== Biography ==
Floca was born and raised in Temple, Texas. He graduated from Brown University in 1991, and currently lives and works in Brooklyn, New York.

== Published works ==
=== As writer and illustrator ===
- The Frightful Story of Harry Walfish (1997, ISBN 0-531-30008-0)
- Five Trucks (1999, ISBN 0-7894-8188-X)
- Dinosaurs at the Ends of the Earth: The Story of the Central Asiatic Expeditions (2000, ISBN 0-7894-2539-4)
- The Racecar Alphabet (2003, ISBN 0-689-85091-3)
- Up in the Air: The Story of the Wright Brothers (2003)
- Lightship (2007, ISBN 1-4169-2436-1)
- Moonshot: The Flight Of Apollo 11 (2009, ISBN 978-1-4169-5046-2)
- Locomotive (2013, ISBN 978-1-4169-9415-2)
- Keeping the City Going (2021, ISBN 978-1-5344-9377-3)

=== As illustrator ===
- City of Light, City of Dark: A Comic Book Novel (1993, ISBN 0-531-06800-5)
- Luck with Potatoes (1995, ISBN 0-531-09473-1)
- The Voyager’s Stone: The Adventures of a Message-Carrying Bottle Adrift on the Ocean Sea (1995, ISBN 0-531-06890-0)
- Poppy (1995, ISBN 0-380-72769-2)
- Jenius: The Amazing Guinea Pig (1996, ISBN 0-7868-1135-8)
- The Ghoul Brothers (1996, ISBN 0-8167-4124-7)
- Where Are You, Little Zack? (1997, ISBN 0-395-73092-9)
- Wing It! The Best Boomerang Book Ever (1997, ISBN 0-448-41570-4)
- Counting Feathers (1997, ISBN 1-55110-651-5)
- Mixed-Up Max (1997, ISBN 0-8167-4437-8)
- King Max (1998, ISBN 0-8167-4810-1)
- Poppy and Rye (1998, ISBN 0-380-79717-8)
- That Toad Is Mine! (1998, ISBN 0-694-01035-9)
- Lightning Liz (1998, ISBN 0-516-26360-9)
- The Ultimate Yo-Yo Book (1998, ISBN 0-448-41840-1)
- Ragweed (1999, ISBN 0-380-80167-1)
- Solomon Sneezes (1999, ISBN 0-694-01748-5)
- Make Your Own Time Capsule (1999, ISBN 0-8167-4976-0)
- Sports! Sports! Sports!: A Poetry Collection (1999, ISBN 0-06-443713-2)
- Ereth's Birthday (2000, ISBN 0-380-80490-5)
- Let's Fly a Kite (2000, ISBN 0-06-446737-6)
- Another Great Yo-Yo Book: More Great Tricks and Tips! (2000, ISBN 0-448-41968-8)
- Tales from Dimwood Forest (2001, ISBN 0-06-441017-X)
- A Mountain Lion Ate the Corn Chips (2001, ISBN 1-931020-01-9)
- Ethan's Cat (2002, ISBN 0-7636-1100-X)
- Ethan's Bike (2002, ISBN 0-7636-1101-8)
- Ethan's Lunch (2002, ISBN 0-7636-1103-4)
- Ethan Out and About (2002, ISBN 0-7636-1099-2)
- Ethan's Birds (2002, ISBN 0-7636-1102-6)
- The Mayor of Central Park (2003, ISBN 0-06-051557-0)
- Ethan at Home (2003, ISBN 0-7636-1093-3)
- Uncles and Antlers (2004, ISBN 0-689-86469-8)
- Billy and the Rebel: Base on a True Civil War Story (2005, ISBN 0-689-83396-2)
- From Slave to Soldier: Based on a True Civil War Story (2005, ISBN 0-689-83966-9)
- Bartleby of the Big, Bad Bayou (2005, ISBN 0-525-47366-1)
- Poppy's Return (2005, ISBN 0-06-000014-7)
- Max & Mo Make A Snowman (2005, ISBN 978-1-4169-2537-8)
- Max & Mo's First Day at School (2007, ISBN 1-4169-2533-3)
- Max & Mo Go Apple Picking (2007, ISBN 1-4169-2535-X)
- The Hinky-Pink (2007, ISBN 978-0-689-87588-5)

=== Other ===
- Beatrice Black Bear – a regular feature in Click magazine.

== Awards ==
- 2014 Winner, Caldecott Medal
- 2014 Honor, Robert F. Sibert Informational Book Award
- 2015 Honor, Irma Black Award
