= Moonshot: The Flight of Apollo 11 =

Book by Brian Floca

- Front cover, designed by Brian Floca
- Author: Brian Floca
- Illustrator: Brian Floca
- Language: English
- Subject: Non-fiction, astronautics, U.S. history
- Genre: Children's literature, picture book
- Published: 2009 (Atheneum Books for Young Readers)
- Publication place: United States
- Media type: Print (hardback)
- Pages: 48 (unpaginated)
- ISBN: 9780688159320
- OCLC: 39051276

Moonshot: The Flight of Apollo 11 is a 2009 children's picturebook by Brian Floca about the Apollo 11 spaceflight to the Moon. It was published by Atheneum Books for Young Readers.

== Reception ==
Common Sense Media, in a review of Moonshot, wrote "Author-illustrator Brian Floca combines gripping narrative with a wealth of detail to deliver a beautifully poetic treatment of Apollo 11." and "This would be a treat to read with adults who remember Apollo 11." School Library Journal called it "stirring account" and The Horn Book Magazine wrote "Floca distills all of his gathered knowledge into a concise text, selecting the exact details to transform science into relatable experience".

Moonshot has also been reviewed by Library Media Connection magazine, BookPage, Booklist, the National Space Society, Kirkus Reviews, Publishers Weekly

== Awards ==
Moonshot has received numerous awards including:

- 2009 Horn Book Fanfare Book - Nonfiction
- 2010 Children's Choice Fifth Grade to Sixth Grade Book of the Year - finalist
- 2010 ALA Notable Children's Book - All Ages
- 2010 Robert F. Sibert Medal - Honor
- 2010 Flora Stieglitz Straus Award - winner (joint)
