= Janelle Washington =

American author and illustrator (born 1977)

- Born: September 18, 1977 (age 49); Virginia
- Education: Virginia Commonwealth University
- Occupation: Paper Cut Artist Illustration
- Notable work: Choosing Brave
- Awards: Caldecott Honor (2023)

Janelle Washington (born September 18, 1977) is an American paper cut artist, author, and illustrator of children's picture books.

She is known for her illustrations of the book Choosing Brave, the Caldecott Honor-winning picture book biography of the mother of Emmett Till and how she handled her son's murder. Her work will be included in the 2027 exhibition Women to Watch 2027: A Book Arts Revolution at the National Museum of Women in the Arts.

== Personal ==
Washington was born in 1977 in Virginia. She graduated from Virginia Commonwealth University School of the Arts.

== Works ==
- Washington, Janelle (2025). The heart of our home. New York: Roaring Brook Press. ISBN 978-1-250-35736-6.
- Joy, Angela; Washington, Janelle (2022). Choosing brave: how Mamie Till-Mobley and Emmett Till sparked the civil rights movement. New York: Roaring Brook Press. ISBN 978-1-250-22095-0.

== Awards ==
- 2023 Caldecott Honor for Choosing Brave: How Mamie Till-Mobley and Emmett Till Sparked the Civil Rights Movement
- 2023 John Steptoe New Talent Illustrator Award for Choosing Brave
- 2023 Sibert Honor for Choosing Brave
- 2023 The Walter Dean Myers Award for Choosing Brave
- 2023 Jane Addams Children's Book Award for Choosing Brave
- 2023 Pictus Honor Award for Choosing Brave
- 2023 Flora Stieglitz Straus Award for Choosing Brave
- 2023 Cybils Award for Choosing Brave
