= The Adventures of Beekle: The Unimaginary Friend =

Picture book by Dan Santat

- 1st edition cover
- Author: Dan Santat
- Publisher: Little, Brown and Company
- Publication date: April 8, 2014
- Pages: 40
- Awards: Caldecott Medal
- ISBN: 978-0316199988
- OCLC: 1023214260

The Adventures of Beekle: The Unimaginary Friend is a 2014 picture book by Dan Santat. The book won the 2015 Caldecott Award and tells the story of an imaginary friend in search of a child. This is the third book Santat has written, following The Guild of Geniuses (2004) and Sidekicks (2011), and his second picture book.

== Plot ==
Beekle is an imaginary friend who decides to leave the island where these friends wait to be called into being by a child. After a day exploring the world and being scared, Beekle climbs a tree and cries. It is then that he meets Alice and the two become friends. The book is told exclusively from Beekle's point of view.

== Background ==
One of 13 published books Santat illustrated in 2014, he wrote the book as a gift to his son, who also inspired the story. He has stated that for him personally, the book is "a metaphor about the birth of my son", as "there's the initial anxiety of being a first-time father realizing that there is this inevitable destiny of meeting this new person but knowing you'll love them unconditionally without having ever met. Then the imagination becomes a reality when you finally hold your child in your arms for the first time, and that's when your imaginary friend gets his name, Beekle". The name Beekle came from his son's first word, an attempt to say bicycle. Santat's goal was to explore imaginary friends in a different way from others by taking the point of view of the imaginary friend.

The story was originally a metaphor for the creative process; Beekle was originally drawn with one eye. Through the writing process Beekle become more of a blob and the creative process metaphor was deemphasized to focus on the theme of friendship. In the original draft Santat had Beekle make several attempts to fit in with the other imaginary friends by trying to look and act as they did, as "he doesn't like who he is and feels like he's too weird to be imagined". Santat and his editor chose to remove this from the draft, as they felt that this was "more of a teenagers reaction to not fitting in" and they "decided it was better to write a story about the anxieties of making your very first friend".

In 2015 a film adaptation developed by Jason Reitman for DreamWorks Animation was announced, but years later it was quietly cancelled.

== Writing and illustrations ==
Santat's story is accompanied by his own artwork and Horn Book reviewer Robin Smith has stated that his use of greys and colors and the way that the story being told through Beekle's point of view helps readers to feel Beekle's emotions. The book is meant to be written by Alice, the girl who Beekle befriends. Santat gives credit to his editor, Connie Hsu, for helping him with the story and for calming him about how the book would be received.

The artwork for The Adventures of Beekle was predominantly created digitally, with Santat stating that it was "probably a good 80% digital and 20% traditional". According to Kirkus Reviews, Beekle's isolation can also be sensed from the way the illustrations, "often isolate the tiny Beekle in corners or surround him with large figures accentuate his loneliness". The style of illustrations in The Adventures of Beekle are a departure from the more action-oriented illustrations Santat had been known for creating. The book drew comparisons to Where the Wild Things Are.

== Awards and reception ==
The book was recognized by the American Library Association with the 2015 Caldecott Award, citing its "fine details, kaleidoscopic saturated colors, and exquisite curved and angular lines to masterfully convey the emotional essence of this special childhood relationship" and as an ALSC Notable Book for Children. Several of the Caldecott committee members were so enthusiastic about the book that they, along with Santat got tattoos of imagery from the book.

The book received mostly positive critical reception. Common Sense Media gave the book 5 stars and rated the book as appropriate for ages 3 and up with an A+ rating for educational value. In a starred review Mary Elam, writing in School Library Journal, said that the book "a terrific addition to any library".

Awards
Preceded by Locomotive	Caldecott Medal; 2015	Succeeded by Finding Winnie: The True Story of the World’s Most Famous Bear
