= Bomb (book) =

2012 adolescent non-fiction book by Steve Sheinkin

Bomb : The Race to Build-and Steal-the World's Most Dangerous Weapon
- Author: Steve Sheinkin
- Language: English
- Genre: Non-fiction
- Publisher: Roaring Brook Press
- Publication date: 2012
- Publication place: United States
- Media type: Prints
- Pages: 272
- ISBN: 1596434872
- OCLC: 758244492
- Dewey Decimal: 623.45119 SHE
- LC Class: UG1282.A8 .S235 2012

Bomb: The Race to Build—and Steal—the World's Most Dangerous Weapon is a 2012 adolescent non-fiction book by author Steve Sheinkin. The book won the 2013 Newbery Honor and Sibert Medal from the American Library Association. This book follows the process of building the nuclear bomb by the discovery of nuclear fission by German scientist Otto Hahn on December 17, 1938.

== Introduction ==
The book traces the origin and development of the first atomic bomb. It follows the development of the atomic bomb from the discovery of nuclear fission through the Nazi heavy water manufacture to the Manhattan Project and the attempts of the Soviet Union to steal the bomb design, finishing at the dropping of the bombs on the cities of Nagasaki and Hiroshima Japan.

== Reception ==
The St. Louis Post-Dispatch (Missouri) in 2013 called this the best nonfiction book of the year for young adults (YA), and said that it was a '... most distinguished informational ...' book. Kirkus Review said "the book is a true spy thriller...It takes a lot of work to make a complicated subject clear and exciting, and from his prodigious research and storytelling skill, Sheinkin has created a nonfiction story young people will want to read." Lisa Taylor, from School Library Journal Reviews, said that "this award-winning, meticulously sourced book deserves a spot in every library" and Brian Odom noted the extensive historical information and hard facts, concluding that Bomb was a "well-documented account. It reads like an international spy thriller, and that's the beauty of it."

== Graphic novel adaptation ==
In 2023, Macmillan published a graphic novel adaptation of Bomb by Nick Bertozzi. The work was praised for balancing gripping, fast-paced action with the human cost of the weapon, using clear science explanations and haunting imagery to convey both ingenuity and devastation.

== Awards ==
- 2013 Sibert Medal
- 2013 YALSA Award for Excellence in Nonfiction
- 2013 Newbery Medal Honor Book
- 2012 National Book Award Finalist for Young People's Literature
