= Locomotive (book) =

Verse nonfiction picture book by Brian Floca

- Cover image
- Author: Brian Floca
- Illustrator: Brian Floca
- Language: English
- Genre: Picture book
- Publisher: Atheneum Books for Young Readers, An imprint of Simon and Schuster Children's Publishing
- Publication date: September 3, 2013
- Publication place: United States
- Media type: Print
- Pages: 64 pp
- ISBN: 978-1-4169-9415-2

Locomotive is a 2013 children's book written and illustrated by Brian Floca. A non-fiction book written primarily in free verse, the book follows a family as they ride a transcontinental steam engine train in summer of 1869. The book details the workers, passengers, landscape, and effects of building and operating the first transcontinental railroad. The book also contains prose about the earlier and later history of locomotives. The book took Floca four years to create, which included a change in perspective from following the crew of the train to following a family. Floca conducted extensive research including his own train ride and consultation with experts to ensure he had the details all correct.

The book was well received by critics and won both the Randolph Caldecott Medal for "most distinguished American picture book for children" and a Robert F. Sibert Honor, for nonfiction writing. Both the book's writing and illustrations drew praise, with particular attention given to the way Floca designed the book. This design, combined with the second person narration, created the effect of making the readers feel like they were actually partaking in the train journey themselves. While most critics praised Floca's combination of pictures, information, prose, and free verse, for some critics the overall effect made it hard to identify who the target audience was for the book.

== Background and publication ==
Floca had no trouble pitching the book and credits his editor of twenty years with helping to make the book high quality. He did have substantially more trouble actually creating the book, which took him four years to write and illustrate. At the beginning of the creative process it was Floca's sense of "traveling through a landscape—in that sense of movement and sense of place" that drew him to trains. When he started to write the book, Floca was unsure of which kind of locomotive he wanted to write about. He eventually honed in on the steam engine and the transcontinental railroad and credits this decision with helping the book because he could "fall in love" with the time period as well. To get a better feel, Floca recreated the journeway on Amtrak.

Once he had settled on his time and place, the author still had to work hard to understand how the steam engine worked. Floca's biggest challenge was in having to rethink who the point-of-view characters would be, changing from the train's crew to a family. Early in the writing of the book, Floca knew he wanted an image of a locomotive on the cover and a bison on the inside, or case, cover. As part of his research process Floca consulted a number of experts to ensure its historical accuracy. Floca also credited the other artists he shared a studio with, including John Bemelmans Marciano and future Caldecott winner Sophie Blackall, with helping provide him feedback and support.

The book was published on September 3, 2013, by Simon and Schuster Children's Publishing. An audiobook, narrated by Eric G. Dove, was also released.

== Synopsis ==
The nonfiction Locomotive starts by giving historical background in its front cover pages about the construction of the transcontinental railroad in the 19th century. It explains that two companies, Central Pacific Rail Road Company that started from Sacramento, California and Union Pacific Rail Road Company that built from Omaha, Nebraska, collaborated in its construction. Since the government allowed them to decide the meeting point, they selected Promontory Summit, Utah. The purpose of it being built was for people to take less time to travel. Before this, traveling from coast to coast would take up to six months which was difficult and dangerous because travelers traveled by wagons over land or by ship.

After the title page, Locomotive explains, using second person free verse narration, about what it was like to ride the railroad from Omaha to Sacramento in the summer of 1869 using the journey of a mother and her daughter and son. The book explains the jobs of the various people who work on the train itself, and who otherwise support the running of the railroad. It also describes the changing scenery along the way, including notable landmarks and how the construction of the railroad has changed that landscape, the mechanics of actually operating the train, what life was like for the passengers on the train, and the pleasures and perils of railroad travel at that time.

Following this narrative, there is an extensive note about the book. In this Floca gives further explanation of the history of trains, notes other transcontinental projects, and explains more about the impact that railroad travel had on the country, noting the increased freedom to travel and move but also the negative impact the transcontinental railroad had on the Native Americans and bisons. It also discusses the rise of the Pullman Company in the 1870s and how locomotive technology continued to improve. On the back cover Locomotive gives information on how steam power engine works.

== Writing and illustrations ==
Floca described the book first as a picture book but one where he wanted to, "try to get the information in the book as accurate as [he] could." The book's free-verse drew attention from critics. They noted his use of techniques such as alliteration, assonance, onomatopoeia, and internal rhyme which, in the words of Kirkus Reviews, "reinforce the rhythms of the journey." Floca was able to successfully blend his descriptions of passengers, workers, the landscape, and scenery. His ability to contextualize information, as in this book, has sometimes been under-appreciated in comparison to the praise given to his illustrations, with the Wall Street Journal praising it for having "possibly the most lucid explanation of how steam power works ever to appear in a children's book." Locomotive was also part of a trend in children's non-fiction, attributed to the Common Core State Standards, of book written in the second person to make the reader feel like they are present in the time of the book.

Floca's oversized design of the book also enhanced the reading experience, with varying font types and sizes, helping to convey meaning and atmosphere. Floca's carefully crafted endpapers also drew notice and praise. Reviewers praised Floca's ability to compellingly illustrate both vast landscapes and cutaways of the locomotive steam engine. Yet the book remained "approachable" thanks to its illustrations and use of the fictional train journey to transport the reader to the time and place. Floca's illustrations also makes use of both horizontal and vertical space in contrast to some train books which emphasize the horizontal. The book also serves as an example of how Floca, in the words of Elizabeth Bird, "even dares to attempt to inspire awe in his readership" and how a non-fiction to a child can be just as fantastical as a fiction book. The book was illustrated using watercolors.

== Reception and awards ==
The critical reception for Locomotive was notably positive; however, some critics expressed concern over the large age range it was intended to be read by or to. For example, The New York Times praised Floca's brilliance and how his layout makes readers anxious to go to the next page, and that it is an "unusual picture book in that it is intended to please a fairly wide age group, which means it may also frustrate some readers or listeners." In 2014, the Times named it one of the best 10 illustrated books of the year. (Note: It received this designation despite having been published in 2013.) Amazon, Booklist, and the Wall Street Journal named it one of the best books of 2013.

In a mixed review Sara Rofofsky Marcus of Walden University, writing for Library Media Connection, wrote of the differing depth of information at the front and back of the book compared with the verse that dominates the rest of it. In contrast in for The Bulletin of the Center for Children's Books reviewer Elizabeth Bird praised the book's abilities to appeal to those who wished to know a little or a lot about the topic. Kristi Elle Jemtegaard, writing in the Washington Post, also complemented the book's mixed allure writing Floca, "weaves a poetic text and dramatic illustrations into an appealing narrative"

In a starred review, Kirkus Reviews praised the book as, "Nothing short of spectacular". Another Kirkus Reviews review by Julie Danielson describes how for its heavy detail of history the book is a model of research as the writer invested several years of his life looking for information about America's first transcontinental railroad and even drove by himself across the continent. School Library Journal also awarded the book a starred review, with reviewer Margaret Bush writing that Floca is "masterful with words, art and ideas." The audio book also was recognized with a starred review by School Library, with reviewer Jennifer Mann praising narrator Eric G. Dove's "lyrical voice". The book also received starred reviews from The Horn Book Magazine and Publishers Weekly.

The book is a somewhat rare example of a nonfiction children's book which is not a biography winning a major award. The book won the Caldecott Medal for best picture book with Caldecott Medal Committee Chair Marion Hanes Rutsch saying, "The committee was impressed with Floca’s ability to creatively capture the immensity and inner workings of the early locomotive and combine it with a family’s adventurous journey west". In his acceptance speech, Floca spoke of the challenges of writing this book and for children more generally, "While making a children’s book, the things one is asked to take seriously and the things one is asked to take lightly can stand in a sort of inverse relation to the priorities of the rest of the world...this work we do both offers and asks a lot."

It also won both a Sibert honor and an Orbis Pictus honor for best non-fiction book, with the Sibert committee praising the book's, "Flowing, detailed blank verse text and warm, thoroughly researched illustrations fuel the adventure." When Floca was called by the Caldecott committee he was still asleep but expressed his appreciation, "Any attention you get from librarians is great, welcome, and an honor. I’m happy for the book, happy that it will live a little longer and be seen by more people." He was then able to watch the livestream announcement with other children's book writers and illustrators that shared his studio space, some of whom had been used as models for people in the book.

== Notes ==
Awards
Preceded by This is Not My Hat	Caldecott Medal recipient 2014	Succeeded by The Adventures of Beekle: The Unimaginary Friend
