= Otto Undercover =

Series of books by Rhea Perlman

- 6 books
- Author: Rhea Perlman
- Illustrator: Dan Santat
- Country: United States
- Language: English
- Genre: Humour, Children's Book
- Publisher: Harpertrophy
- Published: 2006-2007
- Media type: Print (paperback)

The Otto Undercover books are a miniseries of books written by actress Rhea Perlman and illustrated by Dan Santat. They are written in an informal manner and contain illustrations on most pages. The fifth book, The Brink of the Ex-Stink-Tion, has been chosen by Child Magazine as one of the 50 best books of the year 2007.

== Synopsis ==
The series is about Jake Eboy, known as "Otto Pillip" to disguise his identity. The fake name was created by his parents to protect him. Although he has all kinds of adventures in his self-invented racecar named 'Racecar', his main aim is to find his parents and defeat their enemies.

== Books ==
The series has a total of six books, all published in the years 2006 and 2007.

- Born To Drive (2006) (ISBN 0060754958)
- Canyon Catastrophe (2006) (ISBN 0060754974)
- Water Balloon Doom (2006) (ISBN 0060754990)
- Toxic Taffy Takeover (2006) (ISBN 0060755016)
- Brink of the Ex-Stink-Tion (2007) (ISBN 0060755040)
- Brain Freeze (2007) (ISBN 9780060755058)

== Characters ==
The following is a list of regular characters in Otto Undercover:

- Otto Pillip, or Jake Eboy
- Aunt FooFoo
- Aunt FiFi
- Hogarth and Eleanor Eboy (their letters appear regularly but do not make an appearance until Brain Freeze).

== Plot summaries ==
Otto Undercover is a series about a boy named Otto, whose parents are working undercover. His racecar is the fastest in the world. The mystery of his parents is not revealed until the final book, Brain Freeze.

=== Born to drive ===
Otto enters a racecar competition in which he expected to win $1,000,000 to sponsor research to stop disease. Two car thieves, named Ralphie and Paulie, attempt to produce a replica of Otto's car. They would keep Otto busy repairing the car while they use Otto's car to win the race.

The next day, Otto finds out that the car is fake. When he goes to the race, Otto realises what had happened. He uses his remote control to control his car and make it perform tricks with Ralphie inside. The race continues with Otto inside the car. His rival Fullsom, who overhears Otto and his aunts' communication, but cannot understand the conversation as they talk backwards. Suddenly, an accident happens in front of Otto. Otto takes advantage of the delay and changes tyres, a tactic that helps him defeat Fullsom. At the end of the book, Otto's parents write him a letter revealing his true identity as well as his 'assignments'.

== Prose ==
The series incorporates a lot of wordplay; palindromes like "racecar" and "Otto Pillip" - a double palindrome - regularly feature along with anagrams and backward words. Oxymorons and onomatopoeia are introduced later in the series. Each word is highlighted and its classification is given at the side of the page. Perlman comments that it is a "great way to have something a little challenging and a little educational in the stories but still make them fun". The use of anagrams and palindromes occurs mainly when characters are speaking, and occasionally will appear in descriptive text, but not usually in the narration. They are often used to create confusion in Otto's enemies. Ordinarily the wordplay is used for comedic purposes.

Perlman believes children derive a sense of achievement from completing a chapter but many are frustrated by long chapters, so purposefully writes in small chapters commenting that she 'did that on purpose to make the process of reading a less serious endeavor, especially for reluctant readers who find 12-page chapters overwhelming.'

== Inspiration ==
According to Perlman, the books are based on stories she used to tell her son, Jake, and they incorporate many of the suggestions he made at the time. Perlman still consults her son about the technicalities of Otto's inventions. The inspiration for Brink of the Ex-Stink-Tion came from a family trip to Kenya and Tanzania on a safari. There are six books planned in the series altogether.

== See also ==
- Rhea Perlman
- Dan Santat
- Random House
