= Jason Chin =

American author and illustrator of children's books (born 1978/79)

- Born: 1978 or 1979 (age 47–48)
- Occupations: Author and illustrator
- Writing career
- Genre: Children's picture books
- Notable works: Grand Canyon; Watercress
- Notable awards: Sibert Honor; Caldecott Medal; Caldecott Honor

Jason Chin (born 1978–1979) is an author and illustrator of children's books. His books, which usually deal with science and nature, were the recipients of a Caldecott Medal, a Sibert Honor and a Orbis Pictus Award.

== Early life and career ==
The son of a child psychologist and a teacher, Jason Chin grew up in Brookline, Massachusetts, before moving with his parents to Lyme, New Hampshire when he was seven years old. As a teenager, he lived in Lyme, New Hampshire, and attended Hanover High School, at which he met famous illustrator Trina Schart Hyman during a presentation at his school. After being called by Chin for help with an art project, Hyman became his mentor.

Chin went to Syracuse University to study illustration, and moved to Brooklyn in 2001. While there, he began to work at a bookstore called Books of Wonder, where he was exposed to a great variety of picture books, and fell in love with the idea of working with that medium. His job included illustrating books published by the store, with The Silver Sorceress of Oz, published in 2002, being his first work. Chin had the idea for his own picture book, Redwoods, in 2007.

== Awards ==
Chin's Grand Canyon, published in 2017, was awarded a Orbis Pictus Award and was described as using "book design and inquiry to convey conceptual understanding of geological time and processes." The book was also the recipient of a Caldecott and Sibert Honor. In 2022, Chin's illustrations for Watercress were recognized with a Caldecott Medal.

== Selected works ==
- Grand Canyon, written and illustrated, 2017
- Watercress, illustrated, 2021

== Personal life ==
Chin is married to artist Deirdre Gill and currently lives in South Burlington, Vermont, with their two children (12 and 15 years old).
