= Jewish Lights Publishing =

Publishing company

- Company type: Subsidiary
- Industry: Publishing
- Founded: 1990
- Area served: Worldwide
- Products: Books
- Number of employees: 30
- Parent: Turner Publishing Company

Jewish Lights Publishing is a publishing company. Founded in 1990 by Stuart Matlins in Woodstock, Vermont, the company publishes works for children and adults that come from a Judaic perspective, yet provide wisdom to readers of any spiritual background. Topics covered include Jewish mysticism and spirituality, social justice, self-help, interfaith, and Jewish life cycle events. The company was a division of LongHill Partners along with sister companies SkyLight Paths Publishing and GemStone Press. In 2016, LongHill Partners sold its publishing program to Turner Publishing Company.
