= Aalborg Cathedral School =

Gymnasium (high school) in North Jutland, Denmark

- Aalborg Katedralskole

Location
- Aalborg, North Jutland; Denmark
- Coordinates: 57°2′53.08″N 9°54′40.84″E

Information
- Type: Gymnasium (High School)
- Established: by 1540; 486 years ago
- Principal: Christian Warming
- Teaching staff: 80
- Enrollment: 760
- Website: http://www.aalkat-gym.dk

Aalborg Cathedral School (Danish: Aalborg Katedralskole) is the oldest gymnasium in North Jutland, Denmark. There are about 80 teachers at Aalborg Cathedral School and approximately 760 students who are assigned to 24 high school classes and 6 Higher Preparatory Examination (HF)-classes.

== History ==
The exact date of foundation is not known, but historical documents indicate that in 1540 King Christian III of Denmark gave the school a wing of the old Hospital of the Holy Ghost, Aalborg (Helligåndsklostret i Aalborg) after the dissolution of the Danish monasteries. For many years the church was an integral part of the school but in 1814 it moved from the monastery buildings in Jomfru Ane Gade.

In 1886–1889 the school moved to its current location in a newly built school in Sct. Jørgens Gade (orig. Saxogade), designed by Vilhelm Theodor Walther (1819-1892). The school was rebuilt during 1924–1926 under the direction of architect Einar Packness (1879-1952) and expanded 1959–1960 under design by Leopold Teschl (1911–1989).

The school has since been expanded several times, including in the 1980s, when the sports hall and science wing was built after a drawing by Kjær & Richter. Recently, a completely new building was built with 10 new classrooms, so that the school is now better equipped to meet the new teaching methods, which are a part of secondary education and higher preparatory reform. The school's main building is newly refurbished including a library and study centre on the ground floor.

The first Danish resistance group during World War II – Churchill-klubben – consisted of pupils from Aalborg Cathedral School. Their actions inspired the 1994 book The Boys from St. Petri (New York, NY: Puffin Books, 1996) by Bjarne Reuter.

Alumni have included publisher Søren Gyldendal (1742–1802), historian Johan Ludvig Heiberg (1854- 1928), architect Jørn Utzon (1918–2008) and the current Lord Mayor of Copenhagen, Frank Jensen.
