= Churchill Club =

Danish Resistance Group to German Occupation in WWII

The Churchill Club
- Churchill-klubben
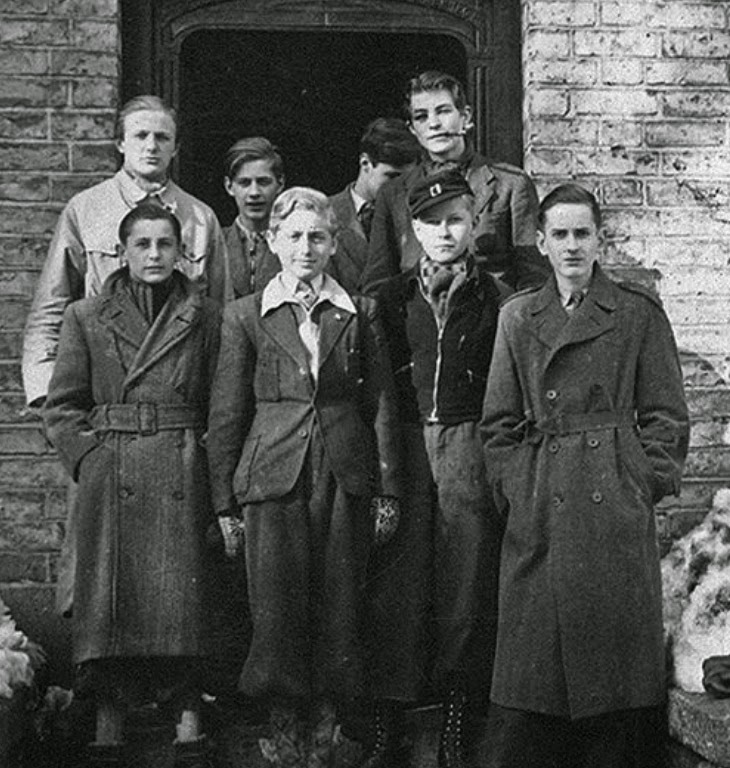
- The early Churchill Club and friends in front of their monastery. Back row (left to right): Eigil Astrup-Frederiksen, Helge Milo, Jens Pedersen, Knud Pedersen. Front row (left to right): unknown, Børge Ollendorff, unknown, Mogens Fjellerup
- Leader: Knud Pedersen
- Dates active: 1941–1945
- Headquarters: Hospital of The Holy Ghost, Aalborg
- Active regions: Aalborg, Denmark and surrounding cities
- Size: 8 (active members)
- Part of: Danish resistance movement
- Wars: World War II

The Churchill Club (Danish: Churchill-klubben) was a group of eight teenage schoolboys from Aalborg Cathedral School in the north of Jutland who performed acts of sabotage against the Germans during the occupation of Denmark in the Second World War.

The Churchill Club was one of the earliest resistance groups to be formed in Denmark. Under the leadership of 16-year-old Knud Pedersen, their activities began at the end of 1941 when they began to target the German occupation forces in Aalborg to imitate the resistance of Norwegian soldiers. They succeeded in carrying out 25 acts of sabotage before they were arrested by the police in May 1942. Some of those acts of sabotage included stealing weapons and destroying vehicles, blueprints, and plane parts. The boys were charged with a fine of 1,860,000 kroner for the destroyed Nazi property; their sentences ranged from one-and-a-half to five years in prison. Even during their imprisonment, some of the boys managed to escape at night to continue their sabotage activities for some time, then sneak back into their cells before sunrise.

== Background ==
On 9 April 1940, the German Army invaded Denmark with little resistance. 14-year-old Knud Pedersen and his family saw the horrific acts of violence the German troops committed against their people. Knud and his older brother Jens also saw how Norway was fighting the invasion and felt shame in their country for giving in within just a few hours. Knud, along with his friends and family, started a small resistance group in Odense, Denmark.

They named themselves the RAF after the British Royal Air Force because of the high level of respect they had for them. The group even carved circles into the seats of their bicycles to mimic the RAF insignia. They started with small acts of sabotage such as cutting phone lines of German Military Headquarters, and turning around or breaking German street direction signs. They performed these small acts through the summer and fall of 1940. In April 1941, Knud moved to Aalborg, forming the Churchill Club there. Meanwhile, the RAF Club stayed active and eventually was in friendly competition with the Churchill Club.

== Formation ==
In the spring of 1941, Knud Pedersen and his family moved 150 miles north to Aalborg, Denmark. A few days before Christmas in 1941, Knud Pedersen officially founded the Churchill Club in order to bring the rebellious acts he had started in Odense with the RAF to Aalborg. Knud and his friends called themselves the Churchill Club after Prime Minister of the United Kingdom Winston Churchill, as they admired his fighting spirit.

The group's operations relied heavily on the Pedersen brothers' access to the Aalborg Monastery, or the Hospital of the Holy Ghost. As the boys were living in the vicarage, they had special access to secluded meeting areas, which the group used to plan missions. Through this secret location, the group was able to keep up the appearance of regular students while simultaneously carrying out acts of resistance.

The RAF club's use of bicycles for quick escapes became a key strategy for the Churchill Club. Like the previous RAF group, the newly founded Churchill Club performed their acts of sabotage in the daylight using their bicycles as their primary form of transportation, since German patrol was very prevalent during the night and since the members were also subject to family curfews. One of their main acts of resistance was painting their symbol on street signs and on the homes and offices of Nazi soldiers. One of their first acts of sabotage was painting the words "War Profiteer" in blue paint on the front of both homes and businesses that were known to be Nazi sympathizers.

== Acts of sabotage ==
Given the nature of German-occupied Denmark, the members of the Churchill Club had to operate under the constant fear of being arrested. Their earlier acts of sabotage, such as vandalizing public places with the group's symbol and stealing German soldiers' personal items, acted more as training for larger acts of resistance to come later. These petty acts of defiance allowed the members of the group to practice operating in secret and manage the risks of doing so. The club always took the opportunity to destroy German vehicles, sometimes by slashing the seats, bending the radiator, or dropping a lit match into the fuel tank.

The club would patrol the town on a regular basis and take any opportunity to steal German soldiers' guns while their backs were turned. The boys would often engage in conversation with soldiers to distract them while one of them would grab the rifles they had rested against walls or on nearby benches. Once, in 1942, the group spotted a pistol in the front seat of a German vehicle. As the guard became distracted by nearby children playing, Knud and Børge watched as a ball was kicked under a German vehicle. Seeing this as an opportunity to obtain the gun in the front seat, Knud asked the German guard if he could fetch the ball. While he did this, Børge distracted the guard with a question, giving Knud the time to grab the gun from the car and stuff it in his waistband.

Being unfamiliar with guns, they never used the stolen weapons; instead, they stockpiled them and also converted them into homemade explosives for sabotage missions. Over time, the group built an arsenal of stolen knives, guns, and bayonets in the basement of the monastery. Although the boys had taken a vow upon founding the club that they were willing to kill for their case, they ultimately found themselves unprepared, as they were so young and lacked military training.

== Aalborg railroad yard attack ==
On 2 May 1942, the club executed one of their most significant operations at the Aalborg railroad yard, which served as a primary transit hub for the German occupation forces. Using discs from mortar grenades, the group targeted a specific train car. The resulting explosion destroyed several rail cars carrying war supplies, including airplane wings, heavy machinery, and Swedish iron ore intended for the German war effort.

During the aftermath, Danish firemen staged a slow response to the fire, delaying their attempt to put out the flames. They justified this delay under the pretext of fearing secondary explosions from the wreckage, which ultimately allowed the fire to spread more and ensured that the German military equipment targeted sustained maximum damage. This act of sabotage is noted as one of their most successful attacks.

== Fuchs Construction Office arson ==
Over time, the group's operations evolved into more elaborate acts of defiance targeting specific German collaborators, such as the Fuchs Construction Company. This construction company was a well-known German collaborator in Aalborg. In February 1942, the group decided to target this company, as they saw it as a symbol of the Danish government's compliance to German occupation. Located at the Aalborg airport, the company's headquarters were separated from the terminals and runways, so the boys decided to show resistance by setting it on fire.

Meeting outside the Aalborg Monastery, the boys planned the act of sabotage in the nighttime. Once they arrived at the airport, they made it through inspections without raising suspicion. They were able to make their way to the site of the construction company, continuing through the countryside. After a few miles of walking, they arrived to where the Aalborg hangars were located, and where they found wooden decoys of animals, placed by the Germans to create a false impression to those flying overhead that they were travelling over farmlands rather than an area of significant military presence. The airport was important to the Germans, as it served as a place for refueling during the invasion and occupation of Norway.

Although there was a manned guard outside the main entrance of the airport, the Fuchs office was left unguarded, as it was off to the side from the airport. The boys present, Eigil, Helge, Børge, and Knud, then cut through the wired fence and then smashed through the windows with a stick. They were then able to go through the windows, finding them inside of the Fuchs office. Here they came across rows of desks, one of which supported a pile of cards that read "You have been visited by a member of the Nazi party." Overlooking all of these desks was a large photo of Adolf Hitler, which the boys then removed from the wall and smashed over a desk, causing glass to go everywhere. The boys then took turns dancing on the portrait in order to further deface it. Then gathering all the drawings, receipts, and business cards they could find, on top of the smashed portrait, placing a pillow on top of the pile and setting it ablaze. After lighting and tossing the match, the boys ran for their bikes. Although the building did not burn down entirely, this was their first large-scale sabotage.

In a Churchill Club meeting following this attack, Eigil, Helge, and Børge told the rest of the group what they had done. The other boys in the group stressed that they felt as though they had made a mistake by not taking credit for the act of sabotage, as the Germans could then diminish it to an attack by common criminals rather than Danish patriots. So, the group took a sledgehammer to a levelling machine they had stolen from the office, wrecking it before writing a message on it, reading "Get out of our country, you stinking Nazis." A few nights later, they rode their bikes back to the site of the fire, to return the ruined machine with the message and their signature in order to take credit.

== Symbol ==
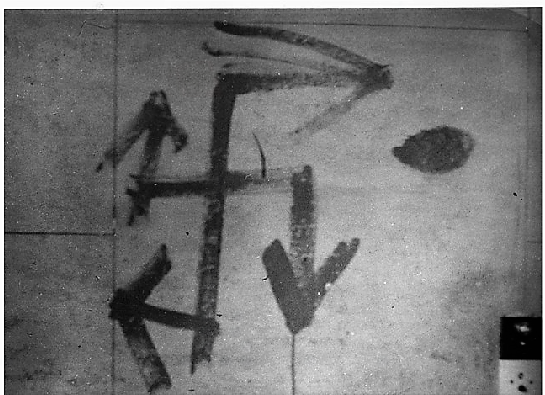
The symbol means "Flames of Rebellion!"

The symbol of the Churchill Club imitated the Nazi swastika; it was blue with arrows at the end of each line, symbolizing thunderbolts. Relying on the specific blue paint used in their acts of vandalism, Danish police searched various companies to find a match for the paint used to deface German vehicles, barracks, and headquarters. The symbol stood for "Flames of Rebellion!"

== Arrest and trial ==
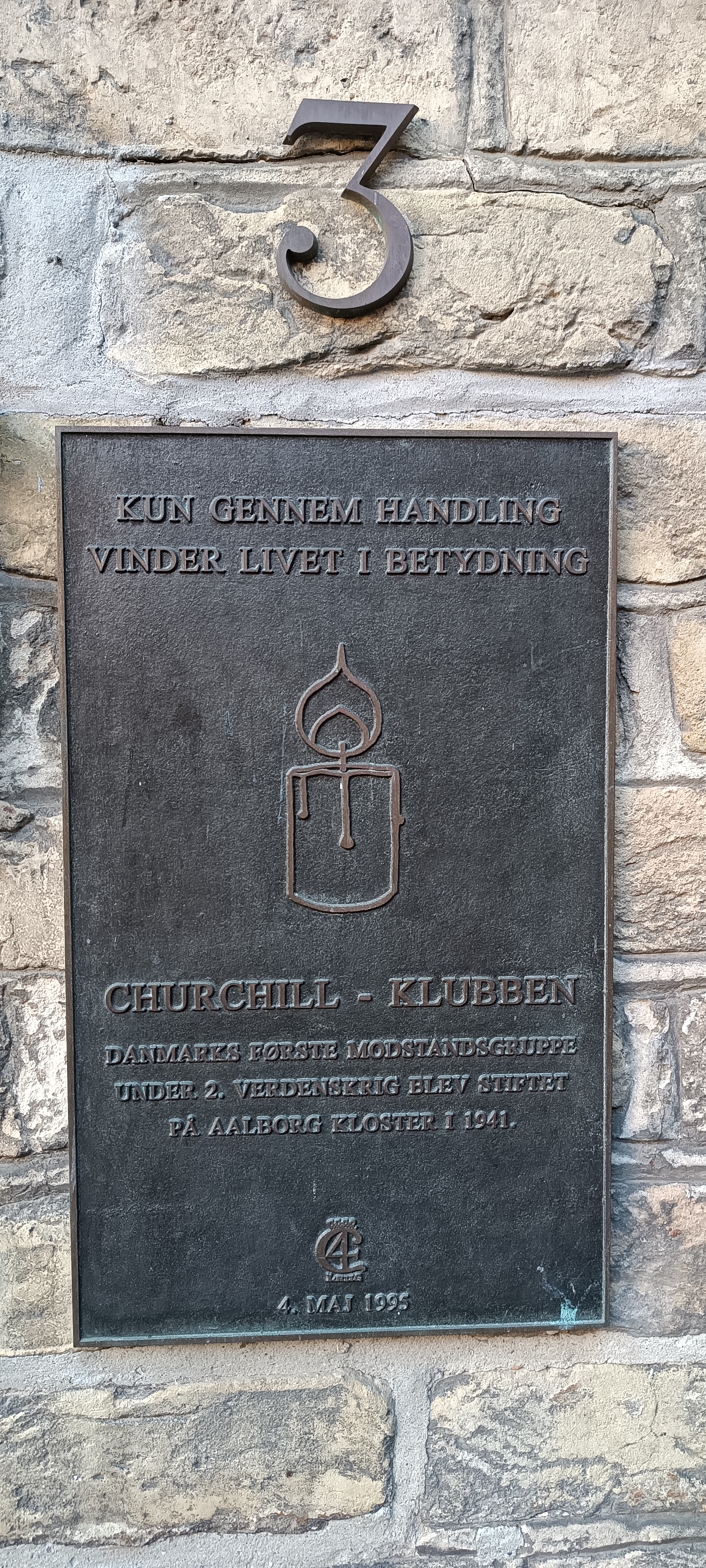
Memorial of the Churchill Club at Aalborg

On 6 May 1942, a waitress (Elsa Ottesen) saw two members of the club enter a large cafe and go straight for the coat closet, where later a German soldier reported a stolen pistol. Witnesses identified the two boys outside their private school. Later that night, Knud was arrested and the Germans took their stockpile of stolen weapons.

Everyone who was involved was arrested that night. In the morning, the principal of the boys' school, the Cathedral School, announced to the class that six of their classmates had been arrested and charged with sabotage against the German army. To show solidarity, several members of the class ran out of the school and to the Hans King Gades Jail to cheer for their classmates. The boys, who were in court at the time, did not hear their classmates' chanting.

The boys were held at King Hans Gade Jail while awaiting sentencing and were later sent to State Prison in Nyborg with sentences ranging from 18 months to 3 years. In October 1942, a few boys (Kaj and Alf Houlberg and Knud Hornbo) managed to escape King Hans Gades Jail for 19 consecutive nights, having sawed loose a window bar, and perform more acts of sabotage. After the boys were recaptured, attacks from the Churchill Club ceased.

== Meeting Winston Churchill ==
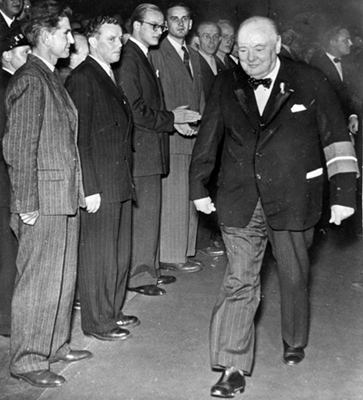
Winston Churchill reviewing the Churchill Club, 1950

In 1950, Churchill visited Denmark to accept an award. On 24 October, he met with the club at a dinner in their honor. Winston Churchill was moved by the story of how they had formed and what they had done to help to resist the Nazi occupation.

== Books ==
Knud Pedersen has written four books about the Churchill Club; all were republished in an omnibus edition in 2005.

- Pedersen, Knud (1946). Churchillklubben.
- Pedersen, Knud (1964). Breve fra fængslet.
- Pedersen, Knud (1966). Sidste krigsår.
- Pedersen, Knud (1979). Sagen om Churchillklubben fortalt gennem kilder.
- Pedersen, Knud (2005). Bogen om Churchill-klubben: Churchill-klubben, Breve fra fængslet, Sidste krigsår, Sagen om Churchill-klubben (Omnibus of the previous four books ed.). Copenhagen: Lindhardt og Ringhof.

Bjarne Reuter's fictional book Drengene fra St. Petri is based on the activities of the Churchill Club. It has been published in English as The Boys of St. Petri.

The story of Pedersen and the Churchill Club is also told in a book by an American author, Phillip Hoose, titled The Boys who Challenged Hitler. It features the story as told by Knud Pedersen himself, and also talks about the RAF Club, another sabotage club founded by Knud when he lived in the city of Odense, Denmark.

== Adaptations and related works ==
The popular 1991 movie, The Boys from St. Petri (in Danish: Drengene Fra Sankt Petri), is based on the Churchill Club but goes beyond the facts of the case.
