= B95 =

B95 may refer to:

- B95, a postcode district in the B postcode area of the United Kingdom
- Sicilian Defence, Najdorf Variation, according to the list of chess openings
- Beechcraft Travel Air, a twin-engine development of the Beechcraft Bonanza
- A model of Berkeley Cars produced in 1959 and 1960
- B95 (red knot), an unusually long-lived Red Knot bird
- Fossickers Way, a road in New South Wales, Australia

Radio stations:

- KBOS-FM, a rhythmic contemporary radio station licensed to Fresno, California
- WBBN, a country radio station licensed to Taylorsville, Mississippi
- WFBE, a country radio station licensed to Flint, Michigan
- WQRB, a country radio station licensed to Bloomer, Wisconsin
- WYJB, an adult contemporary radio station licensed to Albany, New York
