= Nanna Lüders Jensen =

Danish songwriter and singer

Nanna
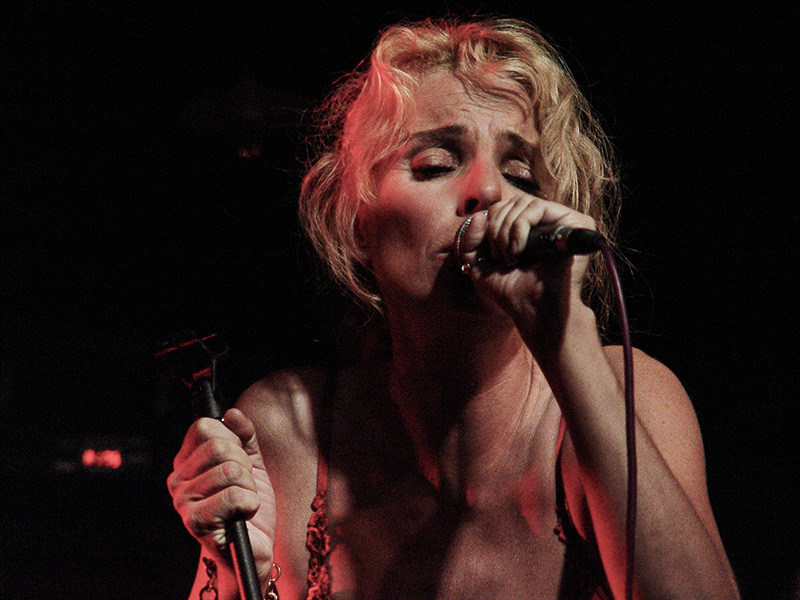
- Nanna at Musketer Festival in Aarhus
- Born: Nanna Lüders Jensen; 23 June 1963 (age 63); Kongens Lyngby, Denmark
- Years active: 1982–1988, 1989–2008, 2011–2017
- Style: Pop music

Nanna Lüders Jensen (born 23 July 1963) is a Danish singer and songwriter, also known as just Nanna. She has released several albums as a solo artist since her debut in 1982. In 1984, she was made famous by her hit single "Buster", the theme song for Bille August's children's television series and movie Busters verden.

In addition to her work as a solo artist, Nanna has featured on a large number of other artist's works. During the 1980s and early 90s she worked with several groups, such as Poul Krebs & The Bookhouse Boys, Hobo-Ekspressen, and Sweet Intentions. As of 2020, she reportedly has over 100 credits for release by other artists. She has also appeared on several talk shows and in various documentaries.

== Career ==
In 1982, Nanna made her debut with her single Om lidt så lægger jeg dig ned. She was 18 years old at the time. A demo cassette interested the record company Replay Records, which released her first three studio albums. The three studio albums were produced by Kim Sagild. The debut album Nanna was released on 21 January 1983, and had sales of 10,000 copies. Små, blå breve (1984) received acclaim in the media, and had sales of 200,000 copies. Shi-Bu-Mi was released in November 1985. Shi-bu-mi or shibumi are transcriptions of the Japanese word 渋み, and the album had sales of 80,000 copies.

In 1985, Nanna won a competition organized by the Danish Red Cross to write a song in connection with the relief effort for 1983–1985 famine in Ethiopia, which also affected Eritrea. The competition was inspired by the song We Are the World. Her song "Afrika" featured a number of major Danish artists from the mid-1980s and won a Danish grammy award. The song raised more than 3 million DKK for the Danish Red Cross, and is the most lucrative Danish relief song to date. The next studio album Fannys hjerte was released on 1 March 1988. It achieved sales of about 20,000 copies from the release date to 1990. Fannys hjerte received praise in the media for breaking free from predictable pop cliches, and finding a personal style.

In 2000, she was given a grant by the Danish Arts Foundation. She released the resulting album, Giv dig hen, in 2005.

== Personal life ==
After an absence from her public career, Nanna published her memoir Stjerne for altid in 2005. In the memoir, she opened up about her experiences with crippling stage fright, depression, and anxiety as a result of her rise to fame at such a young age. Nanna had to cancel in the middle of a performance in the venue Vestergade 58 in 1988, because of stage fright and it took 12 years before she performed there again. From 1990 to 1994, she only wanted to perform as backing singer as a self-described "nervous wreck with stage fright". She has been open about her use of anti-depressants and has self-medicated using cannabis.

Nanna was married to Niels Rasmusen, though they have since divorced. The couple have a daughter, Freja, who was born in 1999. Nanna dated musician and producer Hilmer Hassig in the early 2000s, though their relationship was not revealed until after he died in a car accident in 2008.

== Discography ==
=== Studio albums ===
- Nanna (1983)
- Små, blå breve (1984)
- Shi-Bu-Mi (1985)
- Fannys hjerte (1988)
- I Danmark er jeg født (1989)
- Rocking Horse (1991)
- Prinsesse Himmel-i-mund (1995)
- Honey I'm Home (1997)
- Sangen har vinger (1997, with Mikkel Nordsø)
- Giv dig hen (2005)
- Nødigt, men dog gerne (2011)
- Cowboyland (2015)

=== Compilations ===
- Pletskud & vildskud: Nanna's bedste (2005)

=== Singles and EPs ===
- "Om lidt så lægger jeg dig ned" (1982)
- "I Think I'll Kiss You For A Start" (1984)
- "Buster" (1984)
- "Helst om Kærlighed" (1984)
- "Sammenhold, du (1984)
- "Deja Vu" (1984)
- "Afrika" (1985)
- "Et sted i det blå" (1987)
- "I skovens dybe stille ro" (1989)
- "Go Your Own Way" (1991)
- "Der er et yndigt land" (1993)
- "Danny" (1995)
- "Confidence" (1997)
- Nannas juleguf (2014, EP)

== Filmography ==
Year	Title	Role	Notes
1982	Dansk Melodi Grand Prix	Self	Performing Marie
1985	Rock for Afrika	Self	Documentary
1990	A Modern Woman (Danish: Dagens Donna)	Rikke	Film
1993	Talkshowet	Self	Episode: "Shu-bi-dua"
1993	Just a Touch (Danish: Som et Strejf)	Self	Documentary
2001	Musikbutikken	Self	
2004	aHA!	Self	Episode: "Året 1969"
2005	Go' aften Danmark	Self	Sept. 6, 2005 episode
2005–2006	Twist & Shout	Self	3 episodes
2008	The Bitter Taste of Tea (Danish: Flip the coin - Den bitre smag af te)	Self	Documentary
2008	Elsk mig i nat	Self	Judge on a reality show
2010	4-stjerners middag	Self	4 episodes
2018	Nannas verden	Self	Documentary
2018	Nanna: Død eller levende	Self	Documentary
