= Claudette Colvin: Twice Toward Justice =

2009 young adult nonfiction book by Phillip Hoose

- First edition
- Author: Phillip Hoose
- Language: English
- Subject: Claudette Colvin; Civil Rights Movement
- Published: 2009 (Farrar, Straus and Giroux)
- Publication place: United States
- Media type: Print (Hardcover)
- Pages: 144
- ISBN: 978-0-374-31322-7
- OCLC: 430055396

Claudette Colvin: Twice Toward Justice is a 2009 young adult nonfiction book by Phillip Hoose, recounting the experiences of Claudette Colvin in Montgomery, Alabama, during the Civil Rights Movement.

== Plot ==
This book covers the experiences of Claudette Colvin in the 1950s, focusing on her role in the Civil Rights Movement and her involvement in the Browder v. Gayle trial. Colvin's case is important because she refused to give up her seat on a Montgomery bus when she was 15 years old, nine months before Rosa Parks refused to give up her seat.

== Critical reception ==
Claudette Colvin: Twice Toward Justice gained generally positive reviews from critics. They praised the young adult biography for giving Colvin the recognition she never received back in 1955. The Wall Street Journal said "History might have forgotten Claudette Colvin, or relegated her to footnote status, had writer Phillip Hoose not stumbled upon her name in the course of other research and tracked her down." And the Chicago Tribune says, “Hoose makes the moments in Montgomery come alive, whether it’s about Claudette’s neighborhood, her attorneys, her pastor or all the different individuals in the civil rights movement who paths she crossed . . . . An engrossing read.”

== Awards and distinctions ==
- 2009 winner, National Book Award for Young People's Literature
- 2010 Newbery Honor Book
- 2010 Robert F. Sibert Honor Book
- 2010 finalist, Young Adult Library Services Association (YALSA) Award for Excellence in Nonfiction for Young Adults
- 2014 list, YALSA Outstanding Books for the College Bound and Lifelong Learners: History and Cultures
- 2009 Top Ten list, Amazon.com's Editors' Picks: Best Books for Teens
- 2010 list, Cooperative Children's Book Center Choices
- 2010 Honor Book for Older Children, Jane Addams Children's Book Awards
- 2009 list, Booklist Top 10 Biographies for Youth
- 2009 Nonfiction list, Publishers Weekly Best Children's Books of the Year
- 2011 Master List, Dorothy Canfield Fisher Children's Book Award
- 2010 Nonfiction list, Chicago Public Library Best of the Best

== See also ==
- Minty: A Story of Young Harriet Tubman
- Sojourner Truth: Ain't I a Woman?
