= State Prison in Nyborg =

Prison in Denmark

Coordinates: 55°18′45″N 10°46′36″E

The State Prison in Nyborg
- Interactive map of The State Prison in Nyborg
- Location: Nyborg, Region of Southern Denmark, Denmark.
- Status: Operational
- Population: 220
- Opened: 1913
- Managed by: The Danish Prison and Probation Service
- Warden: Henrik Bonde Marker

The State Prison in Nyborg is a closed state prison, which was built in 1913 at the town of Nyborg in Denmark.

In the beginning it was used to place young inmates who needed a special educational effort. From 1933 to 1973 the prison had a special section for young people, but since 1973 the prison have functioned as a plain closed state prison for males from Jutland and Funen.

The prison have seats in total, of which 24 seats are under the arrest department used by the Police of Denmark. It was home to Knud Pedersen leader of the Churchill club in WW2.
