= Phillip Hoose =

American writer (born 1947)

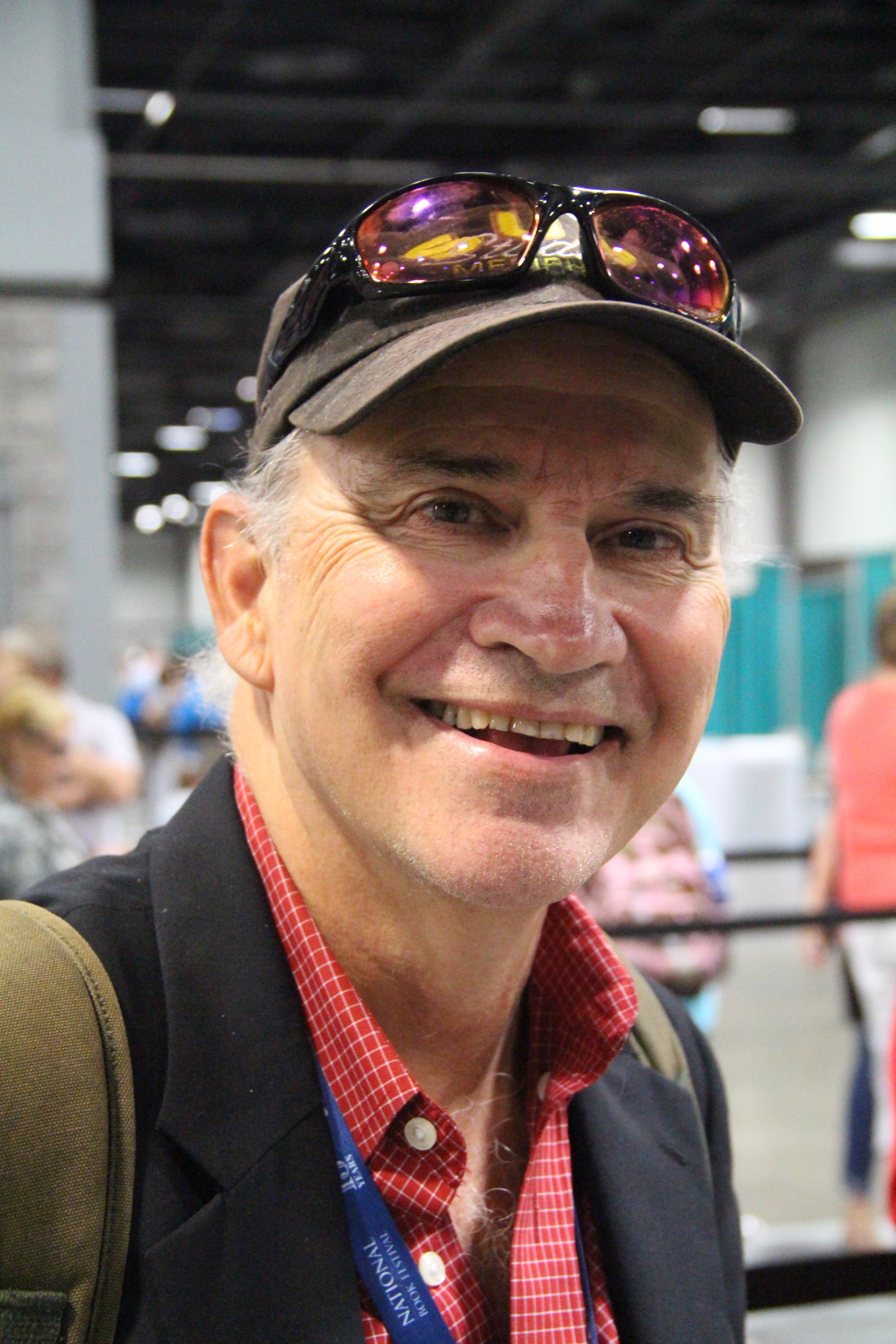
- Hoose at the 2015 National Book Festival
- Born: May 31, 1947 (age 79); South Bend, Indiana, U.S.
- Education: Indiana University; Yale School of Forestry & Environmental Studies
- Occupations: author of books, essays, stories, songs, and articles
- Spouse: Sandi Ste. George
- Children: Hannah and Ruby
- Writing career
- Language: English
- Notable works: Hoosiers: the Fabulous Basketball Life of Indiana; Hey, Little Ant; We Were There, Too!: Young People in U.S. History
- Notable awards: for Claudette Colvin: Twice Towards Justice he won the National Book Award for Young People's Literature, Newbery Honor, Robert F. Sibert Award – Honor; for The Race to Save the Lord God Bird he won the Boston Globe – Horn Book Award, Nonfiction, Orbis Pictus Honor Book, Bank Street / Flora Steiglitz Award

Phillip M. Hoose (born May 31, 1947) is an American writer of books, essays, stories, songs, and articles. His first published works were written for adults, but he turned his attention to children and young adults to keep up with his daughters. His work has been well received and honored more than once by the children's literature community. He won the Boston Globe–Horn Book Award, Nonfiction, for The Race to Save the Lord God Bird (2004), and the National Book Award, Young People's Literature, for Claudette Colvin (2009).

== Life ==
Hoose was born in South Bend, Indiana, grew up in the Indiana towns of South Bend, Angola, and Speedway, and attended Indiana University. A graduate of the Yale School of Forestry & Environmental Studies, Hoose was for 37 years a staff member of The Nature Conservancy, dedicated to preserving the plants, animals and natural communities of the Earth. Hoose has two children, Hannah and Ruby, who are grown. He lives in Portland, Maine, with his wife, the artist Sandbi Ste. George.

A songwriter and performing musician, Phillip Hoose is a founding member of the Children's Music Network and a member of the band Chipped Enamel.

== Writer ==
Hey, Little Ant (Tricycle Press, 1998), inspired by his daughter Ruby and co-authored by his daughter Hannah, received a Jane Addams Children's Book Award.

It’s Our World, Too!: Stories of Young People Who Are Making a Difference (Little, Brown, 1998) won a Christopher Award for "artistic excellence in books affirming the highest values of the human spirit."

We Were There, Too!: Young People in U.S. History (Farrar, Straus, and Giroux, 2001) was a finalist for the National Book Award. In addition, it was dubbed a Publishers Weekly Best Book of the Year and an International Reading Association Teacher's Choice.

The Race to Save the Lord God Bird (Farrar, Straus and Giroux, 2004), received the Boston Globe–Horn Book Award and was named a Top Ten American Library Association Best Book for Young Adults among many additional honors.

Claudette Colvin: Twice Toward Justice (Farrar, Straus, and Giroux, 2009) is a nonfiction account for young adults. It features Claudette Colvin as a pioneer in the Civil Rights Movement, resisting segregation in Montgomery, Alabama. It won the annual National Book Award for Young People's Literature and was a runner-up for the Newbery Medal, among other honors (below).

Moonbird: A Year on the Wind with the Great Survivor B95 (Farrar, Straus and Giroux, 2012) is a nonfiction account of a shorebird, a red knot, banded B95, that has flown more than the distance to the Moon over his lifetime. It was a finalist in the Young Adult Library Services Association Award for Excellence in Nonfiction.

The Boys Who Challenged Hitler: Knud Pedersen and the Churchill Club (Farrar, Straus and Giroux, 2015) opens at the outset of World War II as Denmark chooses not to resist German occupation. Deeply ashamed of his nation's leaders, fifteen-year-old Knud Pedersen resolved with his brother and a handful of schoolmates to take action against the Nazis if the adults would not. Naming their secret club after the fiery British leader, the young patriots in the Churchill Club committed countless acts of sabotage, infuriating the Germans, who eventually had the boys tracked down and arrested. But their efforts were not in vain: the boys’ exploits and eventual imprisonment helped spark a full-blown Danish resistance. Interweaving his own narrative with the recollections of Knud himself, Phillip Hoose weaves an inspiring non-fiction story of young war heroes.

== Awards ==
Hoose reaped many honors for several of his books.

Claudette Colvin: Twice Towards Justice

- National Book Award for Young People's Literature
- Newbery Honor
- Robert F. Sibert Award – Honor
- YALSA Award for Excellence in Nonfiction – finalist
- Jane Addams Children's Book Award – Honor Book
- Booklist Top 10 Biographies for Youth
- Publishers Weekly Best Children's Books of the Year
- CCBC Choice (University of Wisconsin)
- Chicago Public Library Best of the Best
- Vermont Dorothy Canfield Fisher Award Master List
- Carter G. Woodson Book Award – Middle Level

The Race to Save the Lord God Bird

- Boston Globe – Horn Book Award, Nonfiction
- Orbis Pictus Honor Book
- Bank Street / Flora Steiglitz Award
- Parents' Choice Award
- ALA Best Books for Young Adults
- ALA Notable Books for Children
- National Science Teacher's Association-CBC, Outstanding Science Trade Books for Children
- Miami Herald Best Books of the Year
- Washington Post Best Books of the Year
- Kirkus Reviews Editor's Choice
- Publishers Weekly Best Children's Books of the Year
- Great Lakes Book Award
- Maine Lupine Award
- New Jersey Garden State Teen Book Award
- Tennessee Intermediate Volunteer State Book Award Master List

We Were There Too!: Young People in U.S. History

- National Book Award – finalist
- ALA Best Books for Young Adults
- IRA Teachers' Choices
- New York Public Library Books for the Teen Age
- Parents' Choice Award
- NCSS-CBC Notable Trade Book in the Field of Social Studies
- Booklinks Lasting Connection
- Booklist Editors' Choice
- Horn Book Magazine Fanfare List
- Publishers Weekly Best Children's Books of the Year

Moonbird: A Year on the Wind with the Great Survivor B95

- Robert F. Sibert Award – Honor
- YALSA Award for Excellence in Nonfiction – finalist

The Boys Who Challenged Hitler: Knud Pedersen and The Churchill Club

- The Robert F. Sibert Informational Book Honor
- The Boston Globe-Horn Book NonFiction Honor Winner
- School Library Journal Best Book of the Year
- Kirkus Reviews 10 Teen Books You Can't Miss This Summer 2015
- Kirkus Reviews Best Book of the Year and Best Teen Book of the Year
- Booklist Editor's Choice
- New York Public Library Notable Book
- New York Times Book Review Editor's Choice
- Washington Post Best Children's Books of 2015
- YALSA 2016 Nonfiction Award Nominations
- Scholastic TAB Top 5 Buzz-worthy

Attucks!: Oscar Robertson and the Basketball Team That Awakened a City

- 2020 Indiana Authors Award for Children's book

== Works ==
- Hoosiers: the Fabulous Basketball Life of Indiana, Vintage Books, 1986, ISBN 978-0-394-74778-1; Emmis Books, 1995, ISBN 978-1-878208-43-9
- Hey, Little Ant, Tricycle Press, 1998, ISBN 978-1-883672-54-6
- We Were There, Too!: Young People in U.S. History, Farrar Straus Giroux, 2001, ISBN 978-0-374-38252-0
- It's Our World, Too!: Young People Who Are Making a Difference, Farrar Straus Giroux, 2002, ISBN 978-0-374-33622-6
- The Race to Save the Lord God Bird, Farrar, Straus and Giroux, 2004, ISBN 978-0-374-36173-0
- Perfect, Once Removed: When Baseball Was All the World to Me, Walker & Company, 2006, ISBN 978-0-8027-1537-1
- Claudette Colvin: Twice Toward Justice, Farrar, Straus and Giroux, 2009, ISBN 978-0-374-31322-7
- Moonbird: A Year on the Wind with the Great Survivor B95, Farrar, Straus and Giroux, 2012, ISBN 978-0-374-30468-3
- The Boys Who Challenged Hitler: Knud Pedersen and The Churchill Club, Farrar, Straus and Giroux. 2015, ISBN 978-03-7430022-7
- Attucks!: Oscar Robertson and the Basketball Team That Awakened a City, Farrar, Straus and Giroux. 2018, ISBN 9780374306120
- Duet: Our Journey in Song with the Northern Mockingbird, Farrar, Straus, and Giroux. 2022, ISBN 978-0-374-38877-5
- Claudette Colvin: I Want Freedom Now!, Farrar, Straus, and Giroux. 2024, ISBN 978-1-250-36601-6

=== Anthologies ===
- "Indiana's Cinderella Basketball Team", Indiana history: a book of readings, Editor Ralph D. Gray, Indiana University Press, 1994, ISBN 978-0-253-32629-4
