= Busters verden =

- Directed by: Bille August
- Written by: Bjarne Reuter
- Produced by: Tove Berg
- Starring: Mads Bugge Andersen; Katarina Stenbeck; Peter Schrøder; Katja Miehe-Renard; Signe Dahl Madsen
- Cinematography: Søren Berthelin
- Edited by: Jacob Gislason
- Music by: Bo Holten
- Distributed by: Danmarks Radio
- Release date: 7 January 1984 (Denmark)
- Running time: 91 minutes
- Country: Denmark
- Language: Danish

Busters verden (Buster's World) is a Danish children's television series and movie from 1984. Based on a play by Bjarne Reuter, Busters verden deals with the experiences of young Buster Oregon Mortensen. The television series was a break-through for director Bille August, and the soundtrack also provided a hit for the young singer Nanna Lüders Jensen.

== Background ==
The television series was based on a play by Danish author Bjarne Reuter. In 1984 Reuter published his collection Tre skuespil ("Three Plays"); a collection containing also En dag i Hector Hansens liv ("A Day in the Life of Hector Hansen") and Kom der lys i neonrøret, gutter? ("Was There Light in the Neon Tube, Boys?") – in addition to Busters Verden. Director Bille August had already worked with Reuter, on the 1983 movie Zappa where August's script was based on a book by Reuter. August was still a relatively unknown director outside Denmark at the time, but the success he had with Buster helped pave the way for his international break-through with the Oscar-winning Pelle the Conqueror in 1989.

== Television series ==
The protagonist of the series is Buster Oregon Mortensen, played by Mads Bugge Andersen. Buster's father (Peter Schrøder) is an unemployed magician, from whom Buster learns to perform magic tricks. Buster also has a younger sister called Ingeborg (Katarina Stenbeck), who has a disability referred to as a "stiff leg". Both Buster and his sister are frequently bullied by other kids in school, but he maintains a positive outlook on life, and is confirmed in his optimism when he meets and falls in love with the piano child prodigy Joanna (Signe Dahl Madsen).

The series consisted of six episodes of twenty minutes each, that aired between 7 January and 11 February 1984:

- Episode 1: The school Buster attends is celebrating the 25-year anniversary for the principal. Buster is meant to do a magic trick for entertainment, but ends up spoiling the party.
- Episode 2: Ingeborg is being bullied by Store-Lars (Big Lars), and Buster intervenes for his sister.
- Episode 3: While distributing milk on his bike, Buster meets the young piano prodigy Joanna, and falls in love.
- Episode 4: Ingeborg, as a girl scout, is organising a party in the vicar's garden, and Buster helps.
- Episode 5: Buster is not doing well in school and the teachers believe that magic takes up too much of his time.
- Episode 6: Johanna invites Buster to perform at her party, but the snobbish guests were expecting Johanna's piano playing, not Buster's magic tricks.

== Film ==
The movie was an edited version of the television series, and premiered on 4 October 1984. The content had to be cut down, from the original 120 minutes to one and a half hours. The critics were still happy with the result, however, as many felt the movie format gave the viewer a better opportunity to acquaint themselves with the characters. At the 1984 Berlin International Film Festival, the film won both the C.I.F.E.J. Award (Centre International du Film pour l'Enfance et la Jeuneusse) and the UNICEF Award.

== Music ==
The twenty-year-old, and still relatively unknown singer Nanna Lüders Jensen was asked by August to provide a song for the television series. Nanna's song, titled simply "Buster" became an instant hit in Denmark, and launched her to national fame. Extensive studies have been made, famously naming the song "Buster" as the most hated song in Denmark. The song can also be found on her album, "Små Blå Breve".

== Controversy ==
Actor Mads Bugge Andersen is not happy with this movie and all the attention it gave. He believes in general that there is too little focus on the negative side of being a child star.
