= Knud Pedersen =

Danish artist and resistance leader (1925-2014)

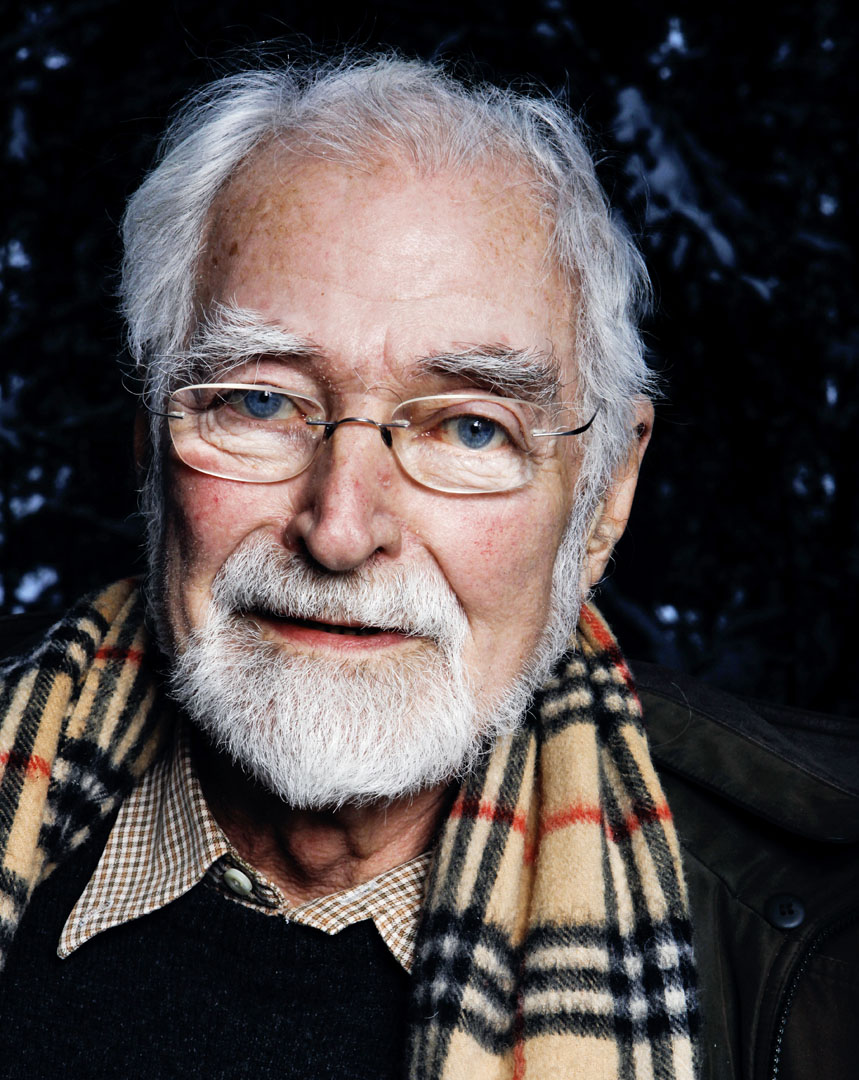
- by Jari Välitalo, 2010
- Born: 26 December 1925
- Died: 18 December 2014 (aged 88)
- Resting place: Assistens Cemetery (Copenhagen)
- Known for: Danish resistance in World War II
- Criminal charges: Sabotage, stealing, destruction of property
- Criminal penalty: prison

Knud Pedersen (26 December 1925, in Grenaa – 18 December 2014, in Gentofte) was a Danish artist and resistance leader. His career as a public figure started in 1942, when he and seven other young Danes founded the resistance group, Churchill Klubben (The Churchill Club). After the war, he worked briefly as a newspaper reporter, attended law school, and worked for a film company before devoting his life to art.

== Second World War ==
Knud Pedersen was a resistance fighter during World War II. Angered that the Danish government had let the Nazis invade without the Danish army putting up a fight, he and a group of Danish teenage boys started the Churchill Club, named after British leader Winston Churchill. The Churchill Club sabotaged cars and train stations and stole many weapons and explosives from the Nazis. Pedersen was arrested and tried for sabotage, stealing, destruction of property, and other offences. He was imprisoned for two years, spending the time in Nyborg State Prison. After release, the Resistance refused his service as the Nazis were watching him, and he could easily be identified on covert missions. Eventually, he joined K Company, Division B, Group 4, which moved weapons caches to avoid German detection.

== Post-war activities ==
After release, Pedersen turned to the arts, partly as an artist but mainly as an organizer. As a youth, he loved painting, and his father encouraged him with an account at a local art store for supplies. His ambition was to make art available to everyone, and he launched several projects. In 1943, authorities gave him permission to install Byens billede, the Picture of the City, an empty frame in which paintings were exhibited. In 1945, he founded his Kunstbibliotek, or Art Library, an art rental space where people could rent a painting for the price of a packet of cigarettes. Both projects still exist, and the Picture of the City is on Nikolaj Kirke Plads in Copenhagen.

As a young bohemian in Copenhagen in the late 1950s and early 1960s, Pedersen was acquainted with many local artists. One was Arthur Köpcke or Køpcke, a German national emigrated to Denmark in 1958. Køpcke ran a small eponymous gallery, Galerie Køpcke, that exhibited some of the most advanced art in Europe. Besides local artists, he exhibited works by Piero Manzoni, Christian Megert, Diter Rot, Robert Filliou, Niki de Saint Phalle, and Daniel Spoerri. Through Rot, Filliou, and Spoerri, he also met George Maciunas, who coined the name Fluxus. Køpcke offered to organize a Fluxus concert in Copenhagen, and Maciunas agreed.

By that time, Køpcke had to leave his gallery space, and Pederson gave him space at Nikolaj Kirke, today Kunsthallen Nikolaj, the old desanctified church in Copenhagen's center that housed the Art Library. Pedersen took an interest and helped organize, resulting in Denmark's first series of Fluxus concerts, the second in Fluxus's history, at Nikolaj Kirke from 23 until 28 November 1962. Pedersen enjoyed the experience and continued to organize Fluxus concerts at the Art Library. The November 1962 concerts brought together a group of four,Pedersen, Køpcke, and two young Danish composers, Eric Andersen and Henning Christiansen, who enlivened Danish art life with numerous Fluxus performances in 1963 and 1964, many organized by Pedersen.

Pedersen continued to work on other projects besides Fluxus. In 1964, he got Tuborg brewery to agree to display art works on the sides of beer delivery vans throughout the country. At the Art Library, he installed a jukebox with works of sound art and offered to rent jukeboxes to every interested institution. In 1968, he opened a savings account at a special interest rate at the Danish Bikuben bank, depositing 100 Danish crowns. He calculated that the 100 crowns would grow to 659 billion crowns in 285 years, providing enough to finance three projects by Fluxus artists Eric Andersen, George Brecht, and Arthur Køpcke.

Throughout this time, Pedersen developed as an artist, partly because Fluxus art is about creating a framework within which the art can develop. Some examples follow. In 1967, he opened the Copenhagen Museum of Modern Art, a virtual museum, where he was director and received daily invitations and publications from other museums. During the early 1970s, the "Fluxshoe" exhibition toured England, and Pedersen organized a "two-ball football match" at University College Sports Ground for the Museum of Modern Art, Oxford. In 1992, during the “Excellent 1992” festival, he organized (i) the Good Buy Supermarket, a one-day sale of art multiples at a regular supermarket, and (ii) the “Three Star à la Carte,” where Fluxus pieces were served in a restaurant setting. The latter was reinterpreted at the Baltic Centre in Gateshead on 15 February 2009 in connection with the George Maciunas: The Dream of Fluxus exhibition.

Pedersen ran the Art Library for most of his life, but he was a prolific writer and initiated many projects. He founded the European Film College, Ebeltoft, and Netbogklubben, the NetBook Club that sold digital books and more. During the 1960s, 1970s, and 1980s, he was an active in the mail art network, exchanging art works with hundreds of artists around the globe. These works, together with a great number of Fluxus works and related documents, make up the bulk of the Knud Pedersen Fluxus Archive, located at Kunsthallen Nikolaj in Copenhagen. The archive, however, is not a systematic collection of material. As Pedersen said, "I do not collect, I just never throw anything away.” He died at the age of 88 on 18 December 2014.

== See also ==
- The Boys Who Challenged Hitler
