= The Boys Who Challenged Hitler =

2015 book by Phillip Hoose

The Boys who Challenged Hitler: Knud Pedersen and the Churchill Club
- The Cover of The Boys who Challenged Hitler
- Author: Phillip Hoose
- Audio read by: Michael Braun
- Language: English-language
- Published: Farrar Straus Giroux
- Publication date: 2015
- Publication place: Denmark
- Media type: Print
- Pages: 198 Pages
- Awards: Boston Globe/Horn Book Nonfiction Honor
- ISBN: 978-0-374-30022-7

The Boys who Challenged Hitler: Knud Pedersen and the Churchill Club is a 2015 non-fiction book written by Phillip Hoose. The book recaps the story of the Danish Resistance group during World War II, the Churchill Club, and its leader and founder, Knud Pedersen. The group's rebellious acts not only infuriated the Germans but also sparked a Danish rebellion, releasing the boys from their temporary captivity.
