= B95 (red knot) =

Individual red knot bird (hatched c. 1992)

B95 (Rufa Red Knot)
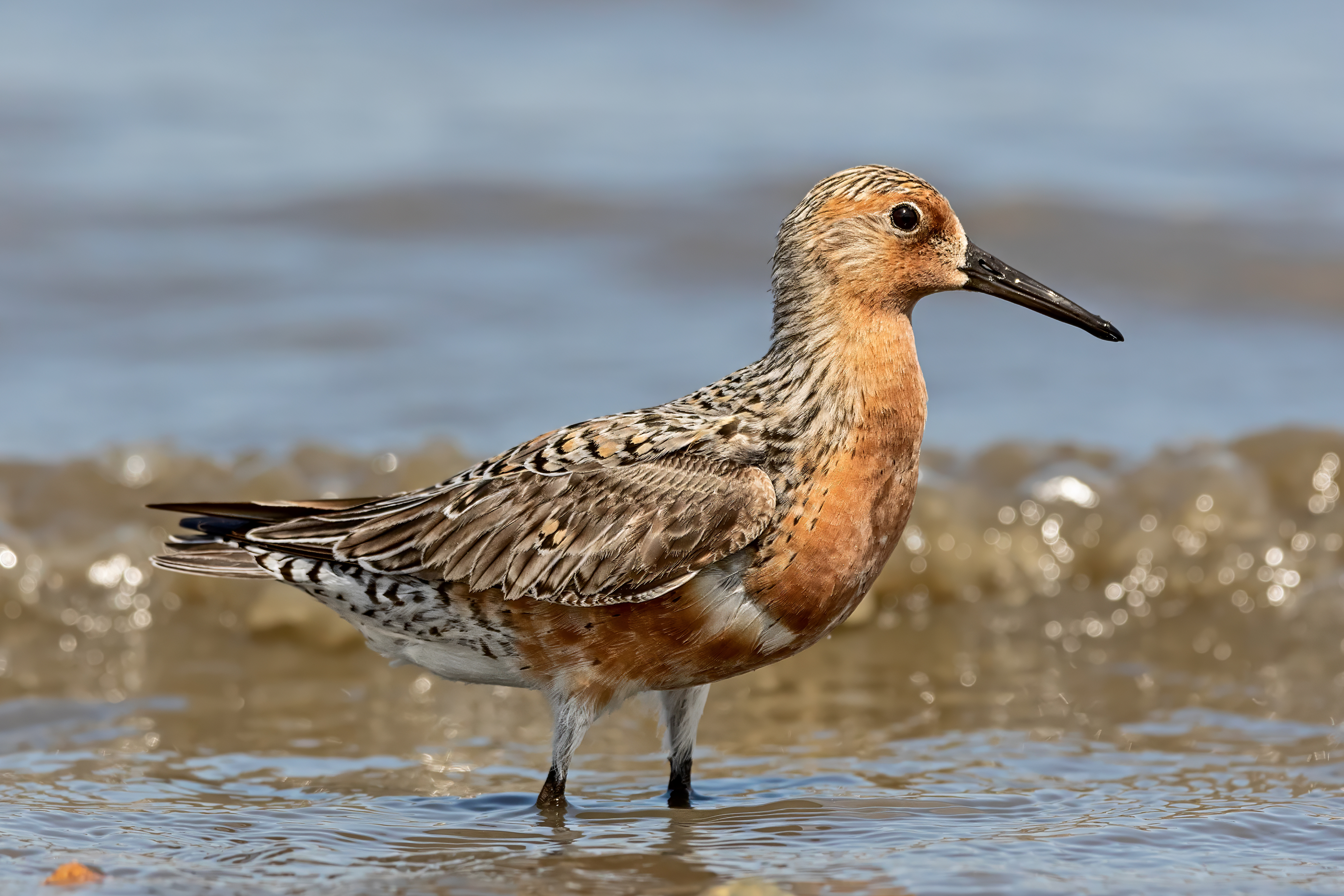
- A "rufa" red knot (not B95) in the surf on Delaware Bay
- Other name: Moonbird
- Species: Calidris canutus rufa
- Sex: Male
- Hatched: c. 1992 (age 33–34)
- Known for: his longevity

B95 (born c. 1992), nicknamed Moonbird, is a red knot.

The bird, a male of the subspecies Calidris canutus rufa of the red knot (a species of shorebird in the sandpiper family), was ringed in Río Grande, Tierra del Fuego, Argentina in February 1995 by Patricia González, an Argentine biologist. It has been resighted many times since then. It also has been recaptured at least three times—the last time in 2007 (aged approximately 14) when it was found to be "as fit as a three-year-old". It is not known how long red knots typically live; one in Europe has however exceeded 27 years.

== Migration ==
Although more formally known as B95 (from the "B95" label on the orange band on its leg), it is nicknamed "Moonbird" because its annual migrations along the Atlantic Flyway between Tierra del Fuego and the Canadian Arctic have in total exceeded the distance to the Moon. It flies approximately 32,000 kilometres (20,000 mi) a year.

In its migration from Tierra del Fuego, B95 stops off in Delaware Bay in the Northern Hemisphere in spring to feed on horseshoe crab eggs, before proceeding to breeding grounds on an island in the north of Hudson Bay. The red knot population has declined since the 1990s because of the harvesting of Delaware Bay's horseshoe crabs for bait; hence restrictions on harvesting have been put in place. Migrating back to Tierra del Fuego in November for the Southern Hemisphere spring, red knots feed on mussels in the restinga tidal flats there.

== Legacy ==
B95 has become symbolic in efforts to conserve shorebirds.

Writer Phillip Hoose, who worked as a conservationist for many years, tracked B95's movements throughout three years and wrote about him in his book Moonbird: A Year on the Wind with the Great Survivor B95 (2012, ISBN 978-0-374-30468-3). The book received an honor in the Robert F. Sibert Award, and was a finalist in the YALSA Award for Excellence in Nonfiction.

There is a statue of B95 in Mispillion Harbor on Delaware Bay. The city of Río Grande in Tierra del Fuego is said to have proclaimed B95 its "natural ambassador".

== See also ==
- List of individual birds
