= Hospital of the Holy Ghost, Aalborg =

Former hospital in Aalborg, Denmark

Coordinates: 57°2′56″N 9°55′7″E

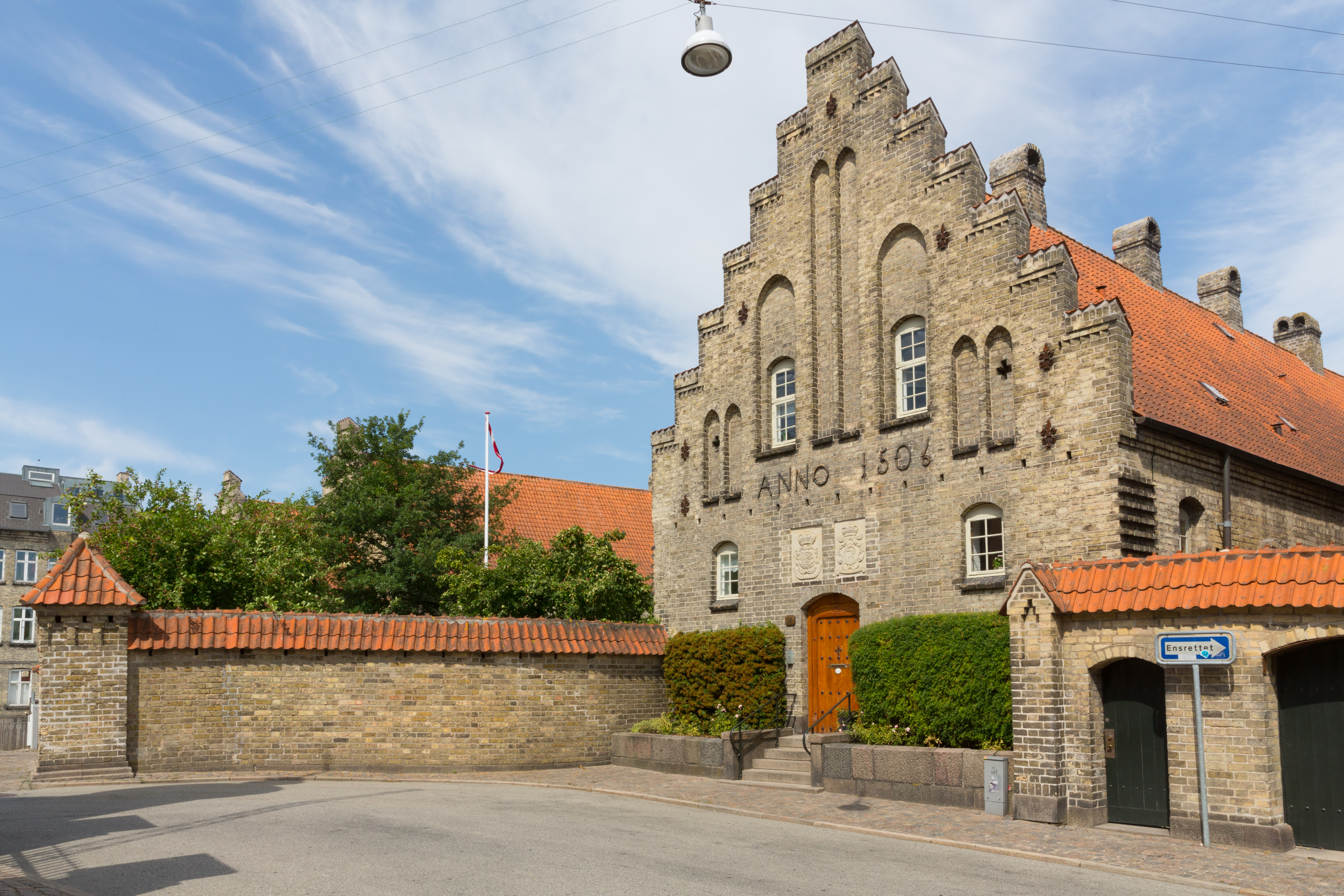
The former Hospital of the Holy Ghost, Aalborg, now Aalborg Kloster

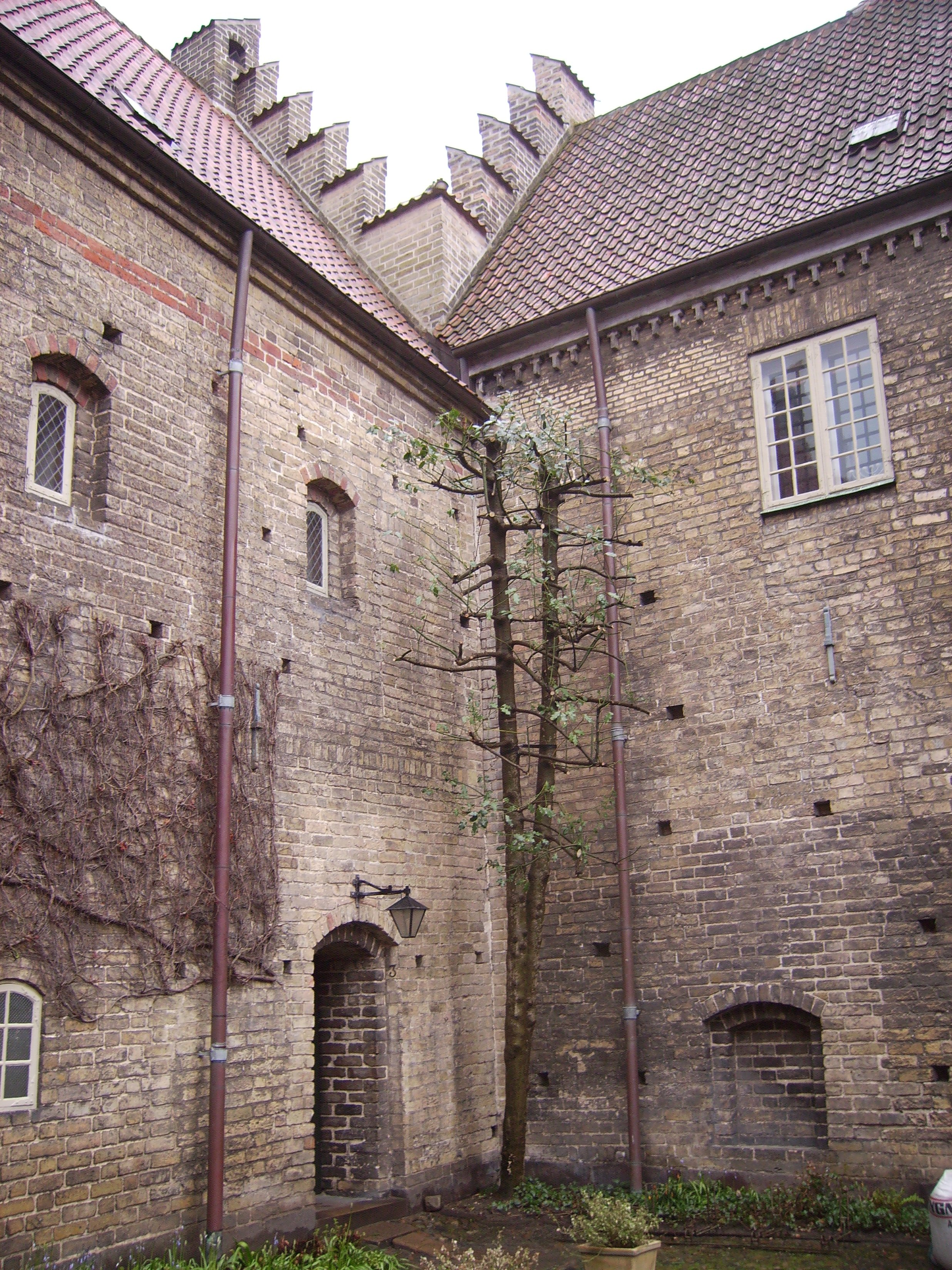
Aalborg Kloster

The Hospital of the Holy Ghost, Aalborg (Danish: Helligåndsklostret i Aalborg), the buildings of which, although now without any religious function, are still known as Aalborg Kloster (lit. Aalborg Monastery), is a former establishment of the Order of the Holy Ghost in Aalborg, Denmark. It was the hospital of Aalborg from 1431 to 1953 and is one of Denmark's best preserved medieval establishments. These are the oldest buildings in north Jutland, and the former hospital is also the oldest social institution in Denmark.

== History ==
=== Foundation ===
The hospital was founded in 1431 by the wealthy Lady Maren Hemmingsdatter with the gift of a large house, adjoining land and an endowment as a "House of the Holy Ghost" (Danish: Helligåndshus), common in Denmark at that period, a charitable institution of a religious nature for the care of the sick, old and poor. In 1434 the house burnt down and the present buildings were built to replace it.

=== Order of the Holy Ghost ===
On 20 August 1451 it formally became a part of the Order of the Holy Ghost, a hospitaller order which had originated in Montpellier, France, with the aim of caring for the sick, the old and orphans. The Aalborg hospital specialised in the care of lepers. It was a double house, with provision for both male and female religious. It gained high status within the order, the prior in Aalborg being the grand master's deputy in Scandinavia.

The monastic complex, when completed in 1500, consisted of four ranges round a quadrangular garden with the magnificent church on the south side, and separate wings for the male and female religious. It was constructed in late Brick Gothic style.

The work of the hospital was paid for with income-producing farms, mills and fishing rights scattered throughout northern Jutland. It even owned its own brickworks. The hospital was also authorized to send out "gatherers" who solicited donations of food, cloth, money or goods for the benefit of the sick poor.

=== Dissolution and after ===
During the Reformation in 1536, the Hospital of the Holy Ghost was dissolved. Its important function as a city hospital was still needed, however, and the city just secularized it: most of the religious simply gave up their religious status and continued doing the same work for the poor. Also, the Order of the Holy Ghost made extensive use of lay people in its hospitals, whose status was unaffected. The hospital continued to operate here until 1953.

The church was another matter. After the Reformation, Aalborg had three large churches without religious organisations to provide for their upkeep, and the townspeople did not want the cost of their maintenance. It was therefore decided to demolish the hospital church and the Vor Frue Church, leaving St. Budolfi Church as the city church. (The tower of the hospital church remained standing until 1880).

For 300 years the grammar school of Aalborg was also located in the buildings.

During the Second World War, Denmark's first resistance group, the Churchill Club, was established here.

== Present day ==
Today the buildings contain a retirement home with independent apartments for the elderly, as well as meeting and exhibition rooms. There is also a chapel where services are held by clergy from the Budolfi Church, now the cathedral of Aalborg. The present Aalborg Kloster is directed in its social care functions by a board consisting of the Bishop of Aalborg, a representative of the North Jutland Region, the mayor of Aalborg, the Chief of Police and two other church representatives.

== Sources and external links ==
- Aalborg Kloster website (in Danish)
- VisitAalborg.com: tourist presentation
