= The Boys from St. Petri =

1991 film

- Directed by: Søren Kragh-Jacobsen
- Written by: Søren Kragh-Jacobsen; Bjarne Reuter
- Produced by: Mads Egmont Christensen; Hedda Craner; Bent Fabricius-Bjerre
- Starring: Tomas Villum Jensen; Nikolaj Lie Kaas
- Cinematography: Dan Laustsen
- Edited by: Leif Axel Kjeldsen
- Distributed by: Nordisk Film
- Release date: 11 October 1991
- Running time: 111 minutes
- Country: Denmark
- Language: Danish
- Budget: DKr 2.2 million

The Boys from St. Petri (Danish: Drengene fra Sankt Petri) is a 1991 Danish drama film directed by Søren Kragh-Jacobsen. It was screened out of competition at the 1992 Cannes Film Festival. The film is inspired by the activities of the Churchill Club, but the actual plot is fiction. It is based on Bjarne Reuter's book Drengene fra Sankt Petri. It has been published in English as Boys from St. Petri.

== Cast ==
- Tomas Villum Jensen as Lars Balstrup
- Morten Buch Jørgensen as Gunnar Balstrup
- Nikolaj Lie Kaas as Otto Hvidmann
- Christian Grønvall as Søren Brinck
- Karl Bille as Olaf 'Luffe' Juhl
- Søren Hytholm Jensen as Anders Møller
- Joachim Knop as Aage Terkilsen
- Xenia Lach-Nielsen as Irene
- Bent Mejding as Provst Johannes Balstrup
- Helle Merete Sørensen as Fru Ingeborg Balstrup
- Ida Nepper as Gerda Balstrup
- Philip Zandén as Jacob 'Rosen' Rosenheim
- Solbjørg Højfeldt as Fru Hvidmann
- Tilde Maja Frederiksen as Lis Hvidmann
- Amalie Ihle Alstrup as Kylle Hvidmann
- Sofie Wandrup as Bitten Hvidmann

== Reception ==
The film was the third highest grossing Danish film of the year with a gross of 2.2 million Danish Krone.
