= The Boys from St. Petri (novel) =

Book by Bjarne Reuter

- First edition (Danish)
- Author: Bjarne Reuter
- Original title: Drengene Fra Sankt Petri
- Translator: Anthea Bell
- Language: English
- Publisher: Gyldendal
- Publication date: 1991
- English publication date: 1994
- ISBN: 0-14-037994-0

The Boys from St. Petri is a children's book written by Danish author Bjarne Reuter, published in English by Puffin Books in 1994. The novel was the 1995 recipient of the Mildred L. Batchelder Award, an award granted by the American Library Association for outstanding children's books originally published in a foreign language. The novel has been cited by multiple scholars in the field of education for its lessons on activism and the Danish resistance during World War II.

== Characters ==
- Lars Balstrup is the main character of the book. He lives with his older brother Gunnar, his mother and his father. Alongside his older brother Gunnar and his friends, they fight to defend their home in Denmark against Nazi rule. He grows up quickly as his actions cause many life or death problems. He discovers a German Luger and is ordered to learn to use it by his brother so he can protect himself in case of an emergency.
- Gunnar Balstrup is the brother of Lars and the leader of the St. Petri group. He is also the oldest in the club and he founded the club with Soren's help. He also leads the boys boat racing team and is regarded as one of the best paddlers. Gunnar has a girlfriend named Irene that he wants to marry.
- Otto Hvidemann is a young boy whose father was killed in the war. He has to help his mother raise his two younger sisters. To help support his family he has a job working at a brickyard. He hates the Germans who are trying to take over Denmark because they played a role in the death of his father. He will try anything to sabotage or kill the German soldiers.
- Luffe Is one of Gunnar's friends whose father works as the railroad manager. He is able to discover key information about the time that trains will arrive and what they will be carrying. When he becomes excited his speech gets slurred. When the St.Petri group decides to carry out the plan to blow up the railroad tracks, he is the one who discovers when the German train filled with machinery will arrive. He is also a scientist and enjoys creating bombs out of any material he can find. He makes a very large one to explode the German train.
- Axel Terkelsen is an older brother and a new recruit to the club of St.Petri when Soren decides to leave. He cares for his family very much and when the boys were executing their last and most dangerous sabotage, “Axel had more on his mind: his sisters dollhouse” which shows that he has a sensitive side along with his devious side that helps him to participate in the club's mischievous adventures.
- Soren is one of The St. Petri club's founders, until leaving after an argument with Gunnar about all the things the club was doing and how it was against the belief of the club and too dangerous. He is not kind to newcomers of the group. He does not trust Otto at all because when they first met he threatens to shoot Soren unless he leaves the area immediately.
- Sevend Hansen is a member of the Gestapo and the man that all people that are not in favor of the Nazi Party fear and hate. He is constantly investigating the St. Petri group throughout the book and in particular Gunner. At the end of the story he is the one who convicts Gunnar, Lars, Luffe, and Axel.
- Dr. Halling, an older man, is the father of Kirsten Halling and a Nazi sympathizer. He is aware that Lars, Otto, Gunnar, Luffe, and Soren all have something to do with the explosions and fires at the airfield. He is also a doctor who enjoys listening to the daily German marching band that most people dislike because they are exerting their presence.
- Kirsten Halling is the doctor's daughter. She really likes Lars and follows him around, even though he does not feel the same way about her. She always wears very nice dresses and has her hair fixed very nicely.
- Irene is Gunner's girlfriend at the beginning of the novel, but later on turns down Gunner when he asks her to marry him. She likes to be alone to think and will normally venture into the woods and sit in a raggedy old abandoned cafe. Lars has a crush on Irean and tells her he loves her and she loves him back.

== Plot ==
=== Summer 1942 ===
Lars is trying to get into a club called the St. Petri group, which is against the Nazis and Adolf Hitler taking over Denmark, his home. He has to go through an initiation test and support the weight of the church's chandelier without dropping it, in order to join. And meanwhile, Lars finds a German Luger (gun) which was stolen by a boy named Otto Hvidemann, who later joins the St.Petri group. After Lars succeeds entry into the group the boys plan their first true sabotage of the German headquarters.

=== Fall 1942 ===
The fall is when the boys plan to steal some bombs from the German headquarters so they can later blow up the railroad tracks that will carry the German machinery for the war. But when they get there things go wrong. A phone started to ring and when they tried to stop it they tripped over one another and set off an alarm. The Germans then start to come investigate what all the noise is about so the boys have to run. Everything then happened very quickly; everyone started to run, then they sent the dogs to go and search for the intruders. In the midst of all the confusion Otto stole a rifle and sub-machine gun and helped Gunner and Luffy stuff Gunners backpack with bombs that were hidden in the German headquarters and brought it back for the club to use later on. When the German's attack dog was let loose it came running at Lars. He got scared and shot the dog in the head with the luger. When the gun fired it caused the Germans to think they were getting shot at opposed to the dog. They started to fire at them. So the boys had no other choice but to shoot back at them and when they did more Germans came running and by the end of night many Germans were shot. When they were about to leave, a young German boy who was unarmed was on the ground saying "don't kill me". The boys were going to but Lars told them that they could not or it would make them like the Germans. As they were leaving, Otto got shot in the arm.

They took Otto to Dr. Halling for help but the man said no because he suspected what the boys had been up to and that they were the saboteurs all the other times. Gunnar then put the gun to his head and told him “I personally, have shot ten Germans tonight. So one more isn’t going to make much difference.” The doctor finally complied to the boys' requests and patched up Otto's arm, and as they were leaving Gunner said if you tell anyone, you are dead. All the boys got on their bike and rode to the brewery where they sat against the wall talking and listening to the sounds of the sirens from the German airfield that they had triggered hours before. Luffy's words were already beginning to slur so even though they had only been there for a short time, they decided to congratulate one another and head home.

The next day at school, all the boys who were there got called to line up at the front where German soldiers were standing and waiting. The young boy soldier who they had let live the previous day was also with the men and this made Lars and Gunner very nervous. The men started to walk the younger boy down the row of boys as he searched their faces on by one. Then the boy caught Lars' eye and gave him a knowing look as if they were on the same side. Lars fidgeted nervously as the men neared and soon he was standing in front of Lars but he passed him without a second glance. The young boy did the same to Gunner, Luff, and Soren, passing them, pretending that he had never seen the boys.

=== Winter 1942 ===
Lars and Gunnar went to the church to fit new candles into the pews, when they saw Sevend (Suckerfish). Gunnar stood in front of Sevend and Sevend was drilling him with questions like “Are you a man of your country” and “Do you feel Danish”. The Nazi German does not intimidate Gunnar or his little Brother when he starts threatening them with bad intentions, and discreetly telling them he knew what the boys were up to.

The St. Petri Group were all afraid of the outcome of what they are about to do. All the boys planned to sneak away from the school play and run to the railroad tracks where a large train would arrive with a lot of important military machinery. The boys were set strategically around the railroad which they had set with a bomb to go off when the train with military machinery inside it was near. They had Axel positioned at the top of the hill with a bright flashlight to signal when the train came into view and the boys anxiously waited for this signal. Finally the boys saw the signal and were about to set off the bomb. Their cover was compromised and suddenly they were surrounded by German soldiers who immediately started shooting at them. Luffy was mortified and unable to run so Gunnar and Lars grabbed him and began to pull him away from the ruckus. Then Lars noticed that Otto was not with them and turned to see him running toward the train tracks to manually set off the bomb. Lars yelled to him to forget about it but Otto did not listen, he was insisting on setting off the bomb and ran faster for the tracks. Lars then saw Otto reach the tracks just as the train was about to reach the area that was set with bombs. Then there was a large explosion and the train fell off the tracks. The boys then all ran separate ways, Gunner went to the cafe in the woods, Axel went home, Otto ran towards the brick yard, and Lars ran to the school.

When Lars arrived at the school he went to find Irene and tell her how he truly felt about her. When he found her they sat down on a bench and he told her that he loved her. Right as Lars told Irene he would never leave her Sevend walked into the room and called to Lars, pulling him away from Irean and telling him he was under arrest. Lars was placed into a cell and the next day united with the other group members as they were marched across the camp to a black armed car. Sevend walked over to them and Gunnar asked him how he knew it was them. Sevend replied that he had found Gunnar's pipe at one of the scenes of the crime, and assumed that they had done all the other things as well. Then Sevend walked away and the boys were forced into the car with other police men and as the doors were locked and the car began to move, driving them away from their home, Otto sounded a bell to signal that he had not been captured and that he was free and safe.

== Bibliography ==
Reurte, Bjarne. The Boys from St. Petri. New York, NY: Puffin Books, 1996.
