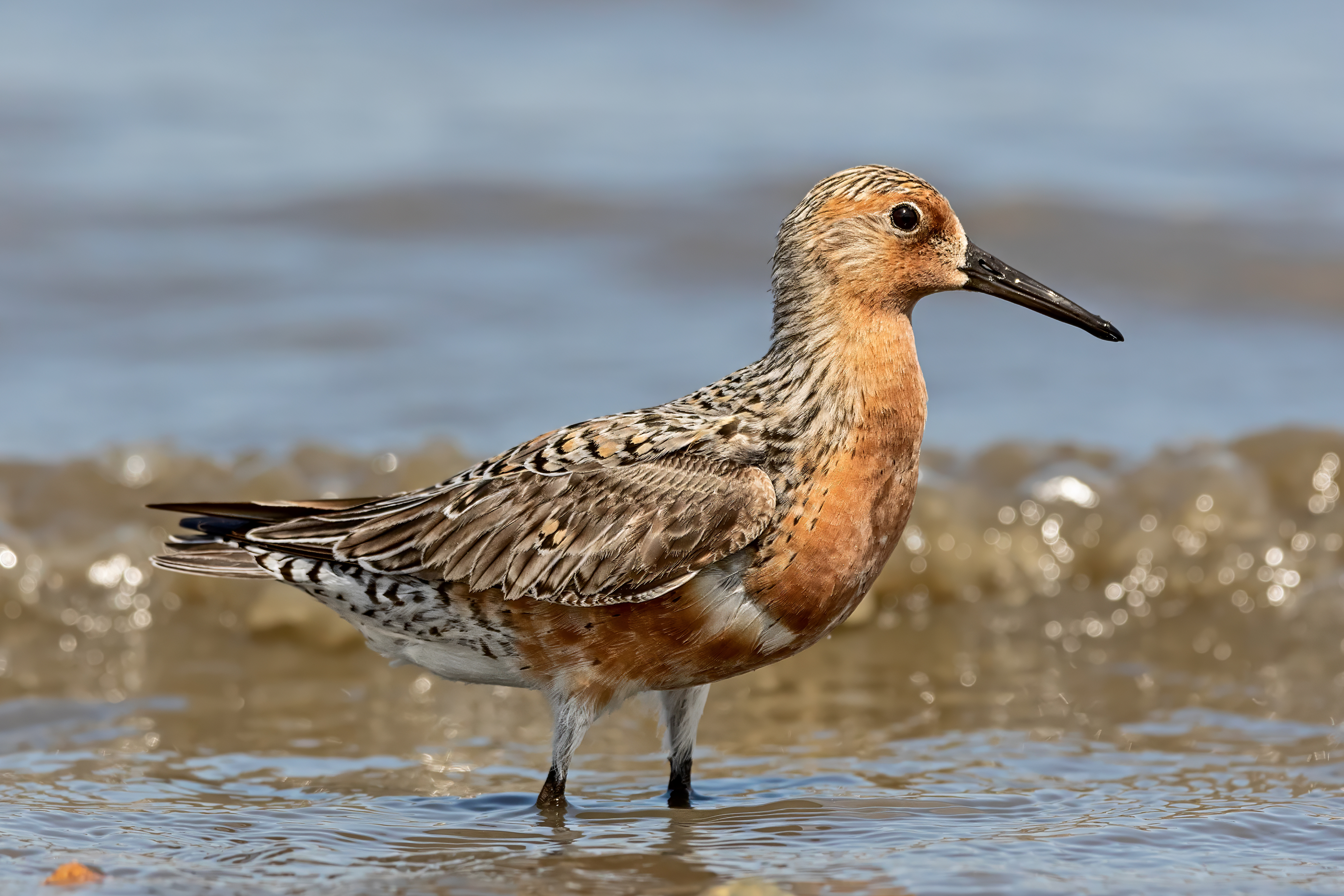
- Calidris canutus rufa, breeding plumage
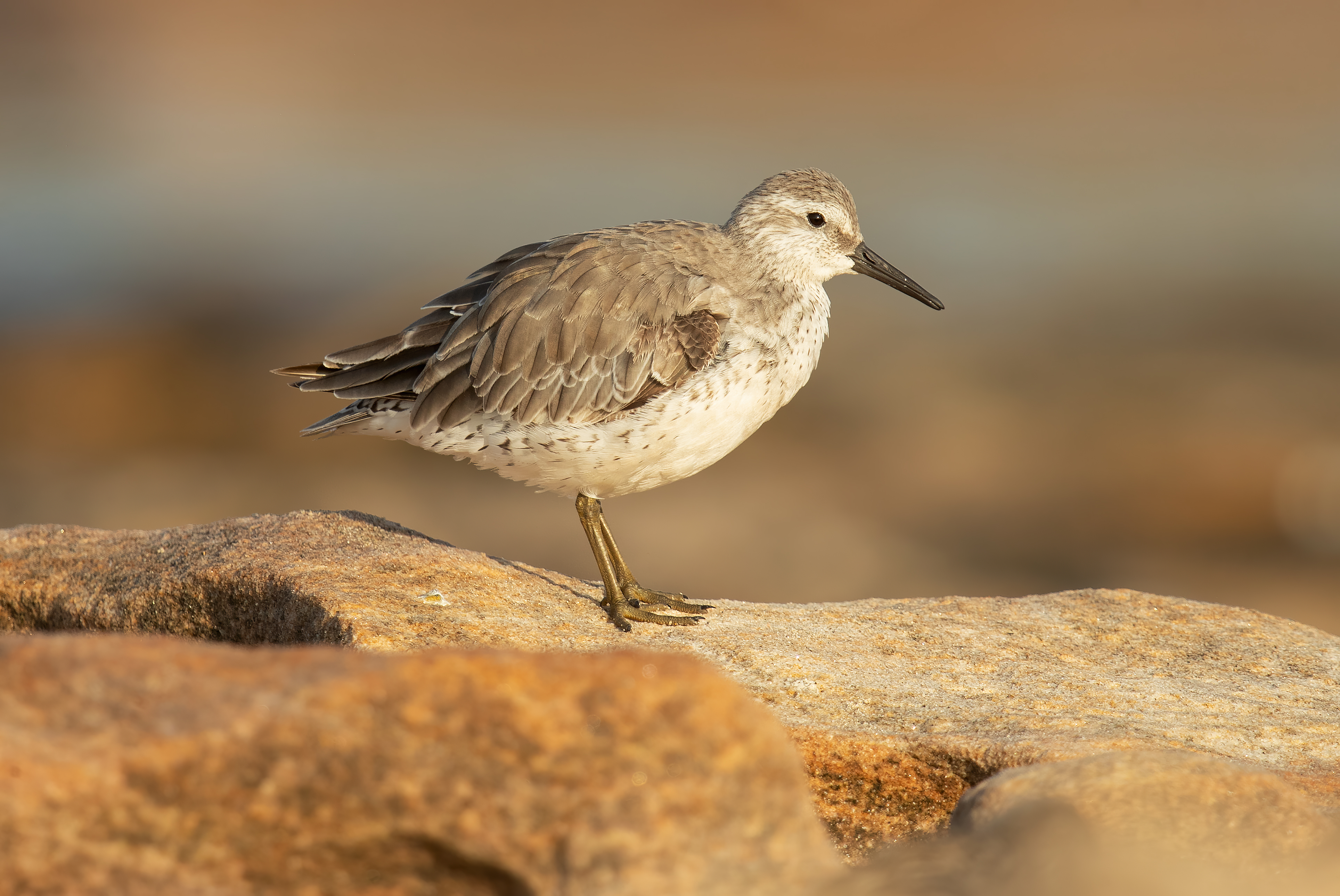
- Non-breeding plumage

Conservation status
- Near Threatened (IUCN 3.1)

Scientific classification
- Kingdom: Animalia
- Phylum: Chordata
- Class: Aves
- Order: Charadriiformes
- Family: Scolopacidae
- Genus: Calidris
- Species: C. canutus

Binomial name
- Calidris canutus (Linnaeus, 1758)
- Distribution and migration routes of the six subspecies of the red knot

Synonyms
- Tringa canutus Linnaeus, 1758

= Red knot =

Species of bird

The red knot or just knot (Calidris canutus) is a medium-sized shorebird which breeds in tundra and the Arctic Cordillera in the far north of Canada, Europe, and Russia. It is the type species of the genus Calidris. Six subspecies are recognised.

Their diet varies according to season; arthropods and larvae are the preferred food items at the breeding grounds, while various hard-shelled molluscs are consumed at other feeding sites at other times. North American breeders migrate to coastal areas in Europe and South America, while the Eurasian populations winter in Africa, Papua New Guinea, Australia, and New Zealand. This species forms enormous flocks when not breeding.

== Taxonomy, systematics, and evolution ==
The red knot was first described by Carl Linnaeus in his landmark 1758 10th edition of Systema Naturae as Tringa canutus.

- - canutus
  - - - roselaari
      - rufa
      - islandica
    - - piersmai
      - rogersi

Population relatedness and divergence. The diversification events may be associated with the Wisconsinan (Weichselian) glaciation 18,000 to 22,000 years ago; the opening of the ice-free corridor in North America 12,000 to 14,000 years ago; and the Holocene climatic optimum 7,000 to 9,000 years ago.

The red knot and the great knot were originally the only two species placed in the genus Calidris, but many other species of sandpiper were subsequently added. A 2004 study found that the genus was polyphyletic and that the closest relative of the two knot species is the surfbird (Calidris virgata).

There are six subspecies, in order of size:

- C. c. roselaari (Tomkovich, 1990) (largest)
- C. c. rufa (Wilson, 1813)
- C. c. canutus (Linnaeus, 1758)
- C. c. islandica (Linnaeus, 1767)
- C. c. rogersi (Mathews, 1913)
- C. c. piersmai (Tomkovich, 2001) (smallest)

Studies based on mitochondrial sequence divergence and models of paleoclimatic changes during the glacial cycles suggest that C. c. canutus is the most basal population, separating about 20,000 years ago (95% confidence interval: 60,000–4,000 years ago) with two distinct lineages of the American and Siberian breeders emerging about 12,000 years ago (with a 95% confidence interval: 45,000–3,500 years ago).

== Etymology ==
The English name knot is most likely onomatopoeic, based on the bird's grunting call note; it is first attested as 'Knottys' in 1452. The species epithet canutus is from Linnaeus's acceptance of a suggestion put forward by William Camden in 1586 that it was named after King Canute, referring to the knot's foraging along the tide line and the myth of King Canute and the tide. There is no historical foundation for this myth as the origin for the bird's name.

== Distribution and migration ==
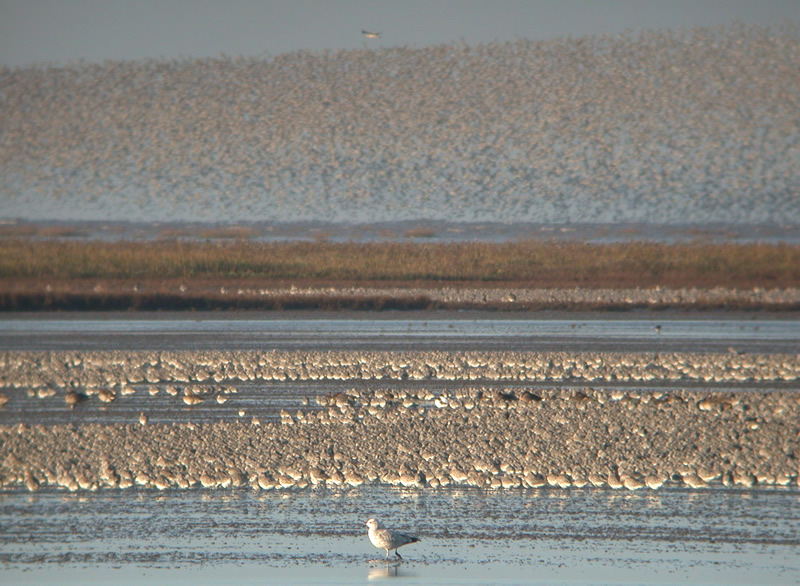
Large flocks of C. c. islandica winter in the coastal marshes of Britain, along with other waders. The Wash, Norfolk.

In the breeding season, the red knot has a circumpolar distribution in the high Arctic, then migrates to coasts around the world to winter at latitudes between 60° N (Shetland) to 55° S (Tierra del Fuego). The red knot has one of the longest migrations of any landbird; every year some birds of C. c. rufa travel more than 14,000 km (9,000 mi) from the Arctic to the southern tip of South America and repeat the trip in reverse. The exact migration routes and wintering grounds of individual subspecies are still somewhat uncertain. The nominate race C. c. canutus breeds in the Taymyr Peninsula and possibly Yakutia, and migrates to Western Europe and then down to winter in western and southern Africa. C. c. rogersi breeds in the Chukchi Peninsula in eastern Siberia, and winters in eastern Australia and New Zealand. Small and declining numbers of C. c. rogersi (but possibly of the later described C. c. piersmai) winter in the mudflats in the Gulf of Mannar and on the eastern coast of India. The recently split race C. c. piersmai breeds in the New Siberian Islands and winters in north-western Australia. C. c. roselaari breeds in Wrangel Island in Siberia and north-western Alaska, and it apparently winters in Florida, Panama and Venezuela. C. c. rufa breeds in the Canadian low Arctic, and winters South America, and C. c. islandica breeds in the Canadian high Arctic and Greenland, and migrates through Iceland to winter in Western Europe.

Birds wintering in west Africa were found to restrict their daily foraging to a range of just 2–16 km^{2} (0.77–6.18 sq mi) of intertidal area and roosted a single site for several months. In temperate regions such as the Wadden Sea they have been found to change roost sites each week and their feeding range may be as much as 800 km^{2} (310 sq mi) during the course of a week.

It is long-lived for a bird of its size; a bird ringed at Brora in northern Scotland as a first-winter in October 1978 (when 3–4 months old) was resighted still alive at Den Helder in the Netherlands in February 2006, 27 years, 3 months, and 29 days after being ringed. Another, tagged "B95" and nicknamed 'Moonbird', of the subspecies C. c. rufa, was at least 20 years old as of his last sighting in May 2014.

== Description and anatomy ==
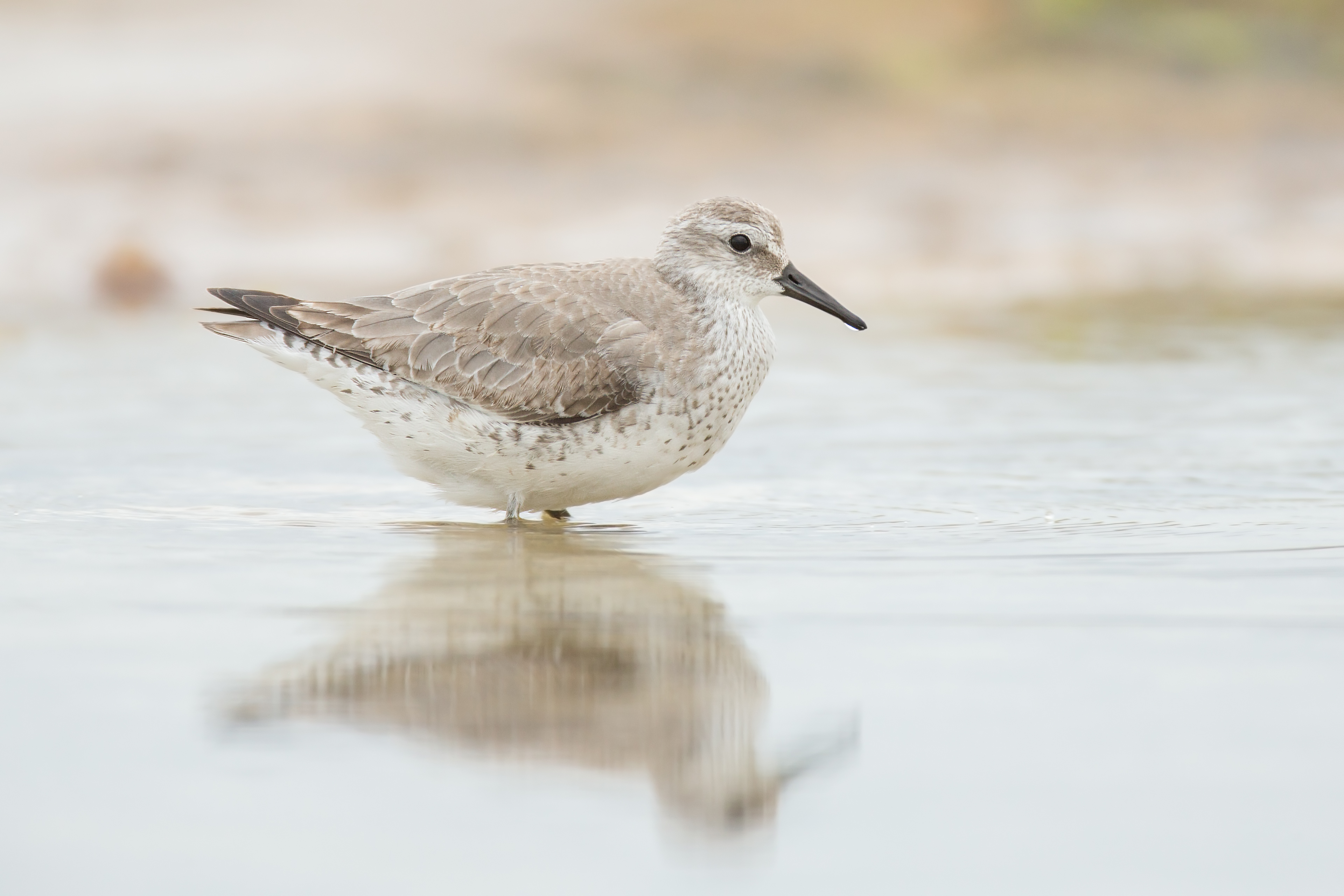
Nonbreeding adult

Red knot is the third or fourth largest Calidris sandpiper (after great knot, male ruff, and the roughly same-sized surfbird), measuring 23–26 cm (9.1–10.2 in) long with a 47–53 cm (19–21 in) wingspan. The body shape is typical for the genus, with a small head and eyes, a short neck and a slightly tapering bill that is no longer than its head. It has short dark legs and a medium thin dark bill. The winter plumage becomes uniformly pale grey, and is similar between the sexes. The breeding plumage is mottled grey on top with a cinnamon face, throat and breast and light-coloured rear belly. The breeding plumage of females is similar to that of the male except it is slightly lighter and the eye-line is less distinct. C. c. canutus, C. c. islandica and C. c. piersmai are the "darker" subspecies. Subspecies C. c. rogersi has a lighter belly than either C. c. roselaari or C. c. piersmai, and C. c. rufa is the lightest in overall plumage. The moult from breeding to winter plumages begins at the breeding site but is most pronounced during the southwards migration. The moult to breeding plumage begins just prior to the northwards migration to the breeding grounds, but is mostly during the migration period.

The large size, white wing bar and grey rump and tail make it easy to identify in flight. When feeding the short dark green legs give it a characteristic 'low-slung' appearance. When foraging singly, they rarely call, but when flying in a flock they make a low monosyllabic knutt and when migrating they utter a disyllabic knuup-knuup. They breed in the moist tundra during June to August. The display song of the male is a fluty poor-me. The display includes circling high with quivering wing beats and tumbling to the ground with the wings held upward. Both sexes incubate the eggs, but the female leaves parental care to the male once the eggs have hatched.

Juvenile birds have distinctive submarginal lines and brown coverts during the first year. In the breeding season the males can be separated with difficulty (<80% accuracy in comparison to molecular methods) based on the more even shade of the red underparts that extend towards the rear of the belly.

The weight varies with subspecies, but ranges between 100–200 g (3.5–7.1 oz). Red knots can double their weight prior to migration. Like many migratory birds they also reduce the size of their digestive organs prior to migration. The extent of the atrophy is not as pronounced as species like the bar-tailed godwit, probably because there are more opportunities to feed during migration for the red knot. Red knots are also able to change the size of their digestive organs seasonally. The size of the gizzard increases in thickness when feeding on harder foods on the wintering ground and decreases in size while feeding on softer foods in the breeding grounds. These changes can be very rapid, occurring in as little as six days.

== Behaviour ==
=== Diet and feeding ===
On the breeding grounds, knots eat mostly spiders, arthropods, larvae, and some plant material obtained by surface pecking, and on the wintering and migratory grounds they eat a variety of hard-shelled prey such as bivalves (including mussels), gastropods and small crabs that are ingested whole and crushed by a muscular stomach.

While feeding in mudflats during the winter and migration red knots are tactile feeders, probing for unseen prey in the mud. Their feeding techniques include the use of shallow probes into the mud while pacing along the shore. When the tide is ebbing, they tend to peck at the surface and in soft mud they may probe and plough forward with the bill inserted to about 1 cm (0.4 in) in depth. The bivalved mollusc Macoma is their preferred prey on European coasts, swallowing them whole and breaking them up in their gizzard. In Delaware Bay, they feed in large numbers on the eggs of horseshoe crabs, a rich, easily digestible food source, which spawn just as the birds arrive in spring. They are able to detect molluscs buried under wet sand from changes in the pressure of water that they sense using Herbst corpuscles in their bill. Unlike many tactile feeders their visual field is not panoramic (allowing for an almost 360 degree field of view), as during the short breeding season they switch to being visual hunters of mobile, unconcealed prey, which are obtained by pecking. Pecking is also used to obtain some surface foods in the wintering and migratory feeding grounds, such as the eggs of horseshoe crabs.

=== Breeding ===
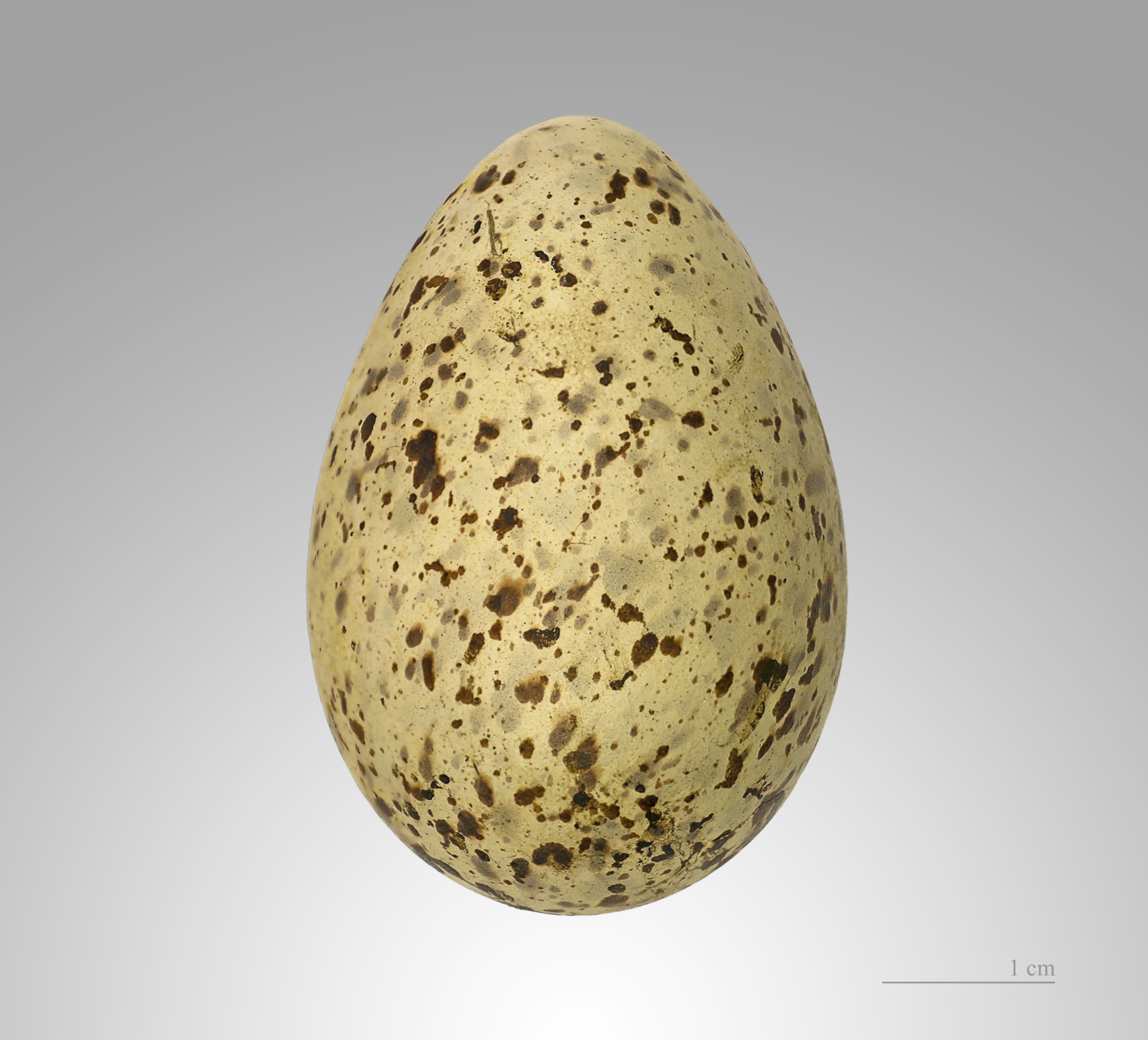
Calidris canutus egg, Muséum de Toulouse

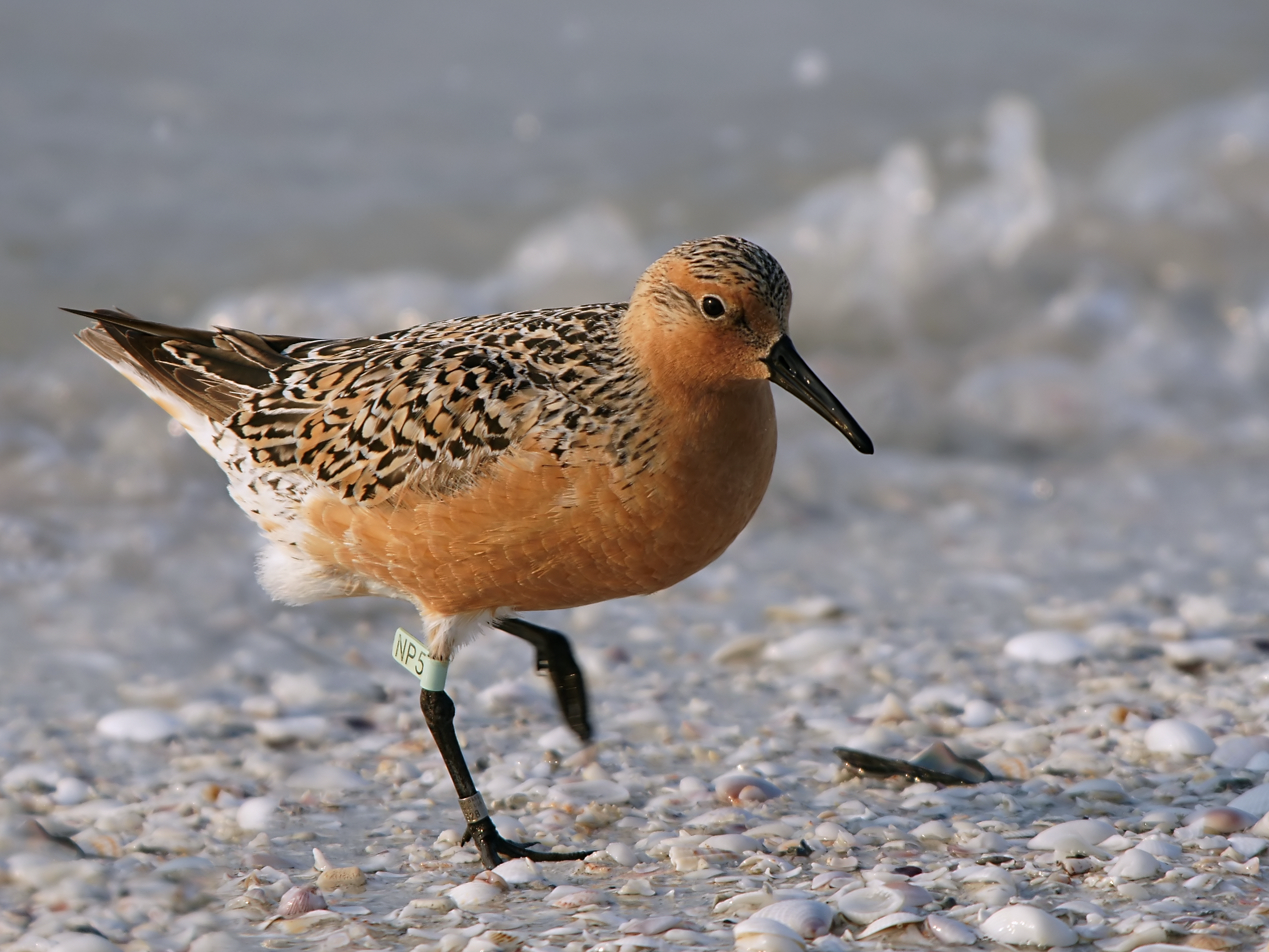
Red knot in breeding plumage

The red knot is territorial and seasonally monogamous; it is unknown if pairs remain together from season to season. Males and females breeding in Russia have been shown to exhibit site fidelity towards their breeding locales from year to year, but there is no evidence as to whether they exhibit territorial fidelity. Males arrive before females after migration and begin defending territories. As soon as males arrive, they begin displaying, and aggressively defending their territory from other males.

The red knot nests on the ground, near water, and usually inland. The nest is a shallow scrape lined with leaves, lichens and moss. Males construct three to five nest scrapes in their territories prior to the arrival of the females. The female lays three or more usually four eggs, apparently laid over the course of six days. The eggs measure 43 mm × 30 mm (1.7 in × 1.2 in) in size and are ground coloured, light olive to deep olive buff, with a slight gloss. Both parents incubate the eggs, sharing the duties equally. The off duty parent forages in flocks with others of the same species. The incubation period lasting around 22 days. At early stages of incubation the adults are easily flushed from the nest by the presence of humans near the nest, and may not return for several hours after being flushed. However, in later stages of incubation they will stay fast on the eggs. Hatching of the clutch is usually synchronised. The chicks are precocial at hatching, covered in downy cryptic feathers. The chicks and the parents move away from the nest within a day of hatching and begin foraging with their parents. Red knot chick diets vary across their Arctic breeding range. Diptera are an important food source across breeding areas, but composition and relative importance differ geographically. In Taymyr, Tipulidae account for nearly 50% of prey DNA detected in faeces. In Greenland, Diptera account for 88% but include almost no Tipulidae. In Alaska, prey DNA is more diverse, with Diptera (29%), Coleoptera (22%), and Lepidoptera (23%) contributing in similar proportions. The female leaves before the young fledge while the males stay on. After the young have fledged, the male begins his migration south and the young make their first migration on their own.

== Relationship with horseshoe crab ==
=== Stopover sites and food availability ===
As one of the "longest-distance migrants in the animal kingdom," the red knot relies heavily on the same stopping sites each year along their migratory routes to refuel their bodies for completing their migrations to and from breeding sites. Red knots travel "in larger flocks than do most shorebirds" flying "15,000 km (9,300 mi) from south to north every [northern hemisphere] spring and repeat the trip in reverse every autumn". Northern hemisphere winters are spent in Tierra del Fuego South America and migration routes lead to breeding locations on islands and mainland above the Arctic Circle during the short arctic summer. These long expeditions are broken into various segments about 2,400 km (1,500 mi) each ending at staging areas that are visited yearly. Specifically, the Delaware Bay is the most vital migratory rest stop for the red knot, as much of their physiological demands are met by consuming the abundance of horseshoe crab eggs as their main food source during migration. The relationship between red knot and horseshoe crab is evolutionarily intertwined as "their arrival coincides with the annual horseshoe crab spawning in the Delaware Bay". Data supports the hypothesis that abundance of horseshoe crab eggs on beaches such as in the Delaware Bay drive movement and distribution of red knots, and the number of horseshoe crabs in the Delaware Bay characterise its importance/ relevance to their migration route. Other stopover spots in the US include islands off the coast of Massachusetts, Virginia, South Carolina, and Georgia. Fewer red knots undergo overland migration routes and winter on the Gulf Coast. Stopover areas on this route are found in the Mississippi river drainage, Northern U.S. saline lakes, and plains in Southern Canada.

=== Dependence on horseshoe crab eggs as food source ===
Red knots undergo various physiological changes before their migration to account for the physical demand of the long expedition: "flight muscle mass increases, while leg muscle mass decreases. Stomach and gizzard masses decrease, while fat mass increases by more than 50 percent". They arrive at stopover sites extremely thin. Since the gizzard is shrunken for their travel, fewer hard foods are eaten and instead soft and nutritious horseshoe crab eggs are the desired food source. As the migration is timed with the release of eggs, they are widely available in these specific stop over locations, making the resource easy to locate and digest, saving the birds energy. Thus, the abundance and accessibility of horseshoe crab eggs at these specific locations justify their intertwined relationship. Body weight may be up to doubled during stopover stays lasting around 10–14 days from constant consumption of food to increase their body fat enough to continue the remainder of their trip. The abundant horseshoe crab population inhabiting the Delaware bay makes it the most important stopover habitat in the red knots migration "supporting an estimated 50 to 80 percent of all migrating rufa red knots each year".

Because of the interrelatedness between horseshoe crab egg abundance and red knot viability, the health of the horseshoe crab population is increasingly relevant in the discussion of red knot population fluctuation and success. Horseshoe crabs were harvested for fertiliser and to feed animals in the early 20th century, and currently are harvested for bait usage by U.S. fishing companies. Horseshoe crab populations took a toll, and red knot population "numbers in Tierra del Fuego (winter) and Delaware bay (spring) declined about 75 percent from 1980s to 2000s". Overharvesting of the crabs in the 1990s provoked the action for population management by the Atlantic States Marine Fisheries Commission to establish "mandatory state-by state harvest quotas and [create] the 1,500-square-mile Carl N. Shuster Jr. Horseshoe Crab Sanctuary off the mouth of Delaware bay." Subsequently, commercial horseshoe crab bait use has been reduced by population management and innovative bait conservation techniques, and a correlated stabilisation in knot populations has been recorded as well.

== Status ==
The red knot has an extensive range, estimated at 100,000–1,000,000 km^{2} (39,000–386,000 sq mi), and a large population of about 1.1 million individuals. In Europe, the species is not believed to approach the thresholds for the population decline criterion of the IUCN Red List (i.e., declining more than 30% in ten years or three generations), and is therefore evaluated as least concern despite being listed as near-threatened globally. However many local declines have been noted such as the dredging of intertidal flats for edible cockles (Cerastoderma edule) which led to reductions in the wintering of islandica in the Dutch Wadden Sea. The quality of food at migratory stopover sites is a critical factor in their migration strategy.

This is one of the species to which the Agreement on the Conservation of African-Eurasian Migratory Waterbirds (AEWA) applies. This commits signatories to regulate the taking of listed species or their eggs, to establish protected areas to conserve habitats for the listed species, to regulate hunting and to monitor the populations of the birds concerned.

Knot populations appear to have stabilised in recent years, though at low levels.

== Threats ==
Red knot populations are greatly affected by climate change since middle and high arctic habitats are necessary for breeding. Higher latitudes and coastal areas where red knots breed and winter are most affected by climate change. Nesting sites are generally on open ground in the tundra near water. Male knots prepare 3–5 sites for nests on "normally dry, stony areas of tundra in upland areas, often near ridges and not far from wetlands". Thus, sea level rise, coastal erosion, and general warming temperatures due to global warming destroy the ideal breeding habitats for the red knot in these arctic coastal regions. Migratory animals by nature have adapted to various environments. Subsequently, rapid and complex responses to climate change are prominent and in the case of the red knot in the recent changing climate, evolutionarily damaging. As arctic breeding grounds continue to warm, red knot body size has decreased, and less success for survival of birds born in warmer years is reported. Even more significantly, their wintering areas in the tropics have become more stabilised, resulting in shorter bill birds (likely due to the fact that stable conditions breed greater ecological success and less variability within species). Consequently, knots struggle to reach their main food sources which include deeply buried molluscs, adding to lesser access to food as well as more expenditure of energy in attempting to attain food.

Indirect threats including horseshoe crab over harvesting and climate change greatly threaten red knot populations. Issues such as climate change may be harder to immediately/directly alter, yet limiting horseshoe crab harvest and human disturbance to protect knot food sources and migratory/breeding sites are effective methods of conservation for the red knot.

== Conservation efforts ==
In 2003, scientists projected that at its current rate of decline the American subspecies, rufa, might become extinct as early as 2010, but the subspecies remained extant as of 2026, when the Delaware Bay spring count averaged 23,435 birds over 2024–2026, up somewhat from record lows in 2021 and 2022. In New Jersey, state and local agencies are taking steps to protect these birds by limiting horseshoe crab harvesting and restricting beach access. In Delaware, a two-year ban on the harvesting of horseshoe crabs was enacted but struck down by a judge who cited insufficient evidence to justify the potential disruption to the fishing industry but a male-only harvest has been in place in recent years.

Late in the fall of 2014, the red knot rufa was listed as a federally threatened species under the United States Endangered Species Act – the second most critical status that can be awarded to a subspecies. This followed a decade of intensive petitioning by environmental groups and a lawsuit against the Department of the Interior for alleged negligence in the protection of endangered species through failure to evaluate and list them. The reasons for the red knot rufa's listing were varied; habitat degradation, loss of key food supplies, and threats posed by climate change and sea level rise were all listed as factors that were considered when the red knot rufa was listed.
