= Bjarne Reuter =

Danish writer and screenwriter (born 1950)

Bjarne Reuter (born 29 April 1950) is a Danish writer and screenwriter best known for children's and young adult fiction. Many of his works are set in the 1950s and 1960s, the time of his childhood and adolescence. Many also feature the Copenhagen area, where he was born in Brønshøj. Reuter is the screenwriter of the popular Danish television series and movie Busters verden ("Buster's World").

In 1977 he was awarded with the Danish Ministry of Culture's children book prize. He won the Deutscher Jugendliteraturpreis for best children's book in 2000, recognising the German-language edition of En som Hodder (1998), and was a finalist for the youth book prize in 2003, for the work published in English as The Ring of the Slave Prince (2004).

For his lasting contribution as a children's writer, Reuter was a finalist for the biennial, international Hans Christian Andersen Award in both 2002 and 2004.

== Selected publications in English ==
- Buster's World (1989)
- Buster the Sheikh of Hope Street (1991)
- The Boys from St. Petri (1994)
- The Ring of the Slave Prince (2003)

== Publications ==
- 1975 Kidnapning (children's book)
- 1975 Rent guld i posen (children's book)
- 1976 En dag i Hector Hansens liv
- 1976 Ridder af skraldespanden (children's book)
- 1976 Rottefængeren fra Hameln (children's book)
- 1977 Den største nar i verden (children's book)
- 1977 Det skøre land (children's book)
- 1977 Eventyret om den tapre Hu (children's book)
- 1977 Skønheden og uhyret (children's book)
- 1977 Tre engle og fem løver (children's book)
- 1977 Zappa
- 1978 De seks tjenere (children's book)
- 1978 Den utilfredse prins (children's book)
- 1978 Drengen der ikke kunne blive bange (children's book)
- 1978 Slusernes kejser
- 1979 Busters verden (children's book)
- 1979 Børnenes julekalender (children's book)
- 1979 Den fredag Osvald blev usynlig (children's book)
- 1979 Rejsen til morgenrødens hav (children's book)
- 1979 Støvet på en sommerfugls vinge
- 1980 Før det lysner (short stories)
- 1980 Kolumbine & Harlekin (children's book)
- 1980 Kys stjernerne (children's book)
- 1980 Suzanne & Leonard
- 1981 Knud, Otto og Carmen Rosita
- 1981 Skibene i skovene
- 1982 Abdulahs juveler (children's book)
- 1982 Det forkerte barn (short stories)
- 1982 Hvor regnbuen ender (children's book)
- 1982 Østen for solen og vesten for månen (children's book)
- 1983 Casanova
- 1983 Når snerlen blomstrer
- 1984 Malte-Pøs i Den Store Vide Verden (children's book)
- 1984 Tre skuespil (drama)
- 1984 Tropicana
- 1985 Bundhu
- 1985 Da solen skulle sælges (children's book)
- 1985 Shamran - den som kommer
- 1986 De andre historier (short stories)
- 1986 En tro kopi
- 1986 Natten i Safarihulen (children's book)
- 1987 Den dobbelte mand
- 1987 Drømmenes bro (children's book)
- 1987 Os to, Oskar... for evigt (children's book)
- 1987 Vendetta
- 1988 Den cubanske kabale
- 1988 Månen over Bella Bio
- 1989 Den skæggede dame (children's book)
- 1989 Peter Pan (children's book)
- 1989 Vi der valgte mælkevejen
- 1990 3 til Bermudos
- 1990 Mig og Albinoni
- 1991 Drengene fra Sankt Petri
- 1991 Lola
- 1992 7.A.
- 1992 En rem af huden
- 1992 Kaptajn Bimse & Goggeletten (children's book)
- 1993 Den korsikanske bisp
- 1993 Johnny & The Hurricanes
- 1994 Anna Havanna (children's book)
- 1995 Langebro med løbende figurer
- 1996 Anna Havanna, Kaptajn Bimse og alle de andre (children's book)
- 1996 Ved profetens skæg
- 1997 Fakiren fra Bilbao
- 1998 En som Hodder (children's book)
- 1998 Mikado
- 1999 Mordet på Leon Culman
- 1999 Under kometens hale
- 1999 Willys fars bil (children's book)
- 2000 Prins Faisals ring; "The Ring of the Slave Prince", English translation by Tiina Nunnally (2004)
- 2002 Barolo Kvartetten
- 2002 Kaptajn Bimse i Saltimbocca (children's book)
- 2003 Kaptajn Bimses jul (children's book)
- 2004 Løgnhalsen fra Umbrien
- 2006 Halvvejen til Rafael(Novel)
- 2007 Skyggernes hus
- 2008 Fem
- 2008 Den iranske gartner
- 2010 Den egyptiske tenor

== Sources ==
- Lexopen
