= Gerard Huerta =

American typographer and graphic designer

- Born: March 19, 1952 (age 74); Los Angeles, California, U.S.
- Education: Art Center College of Design
- Occupations: Typographer, graphic designer

Gerard Huerta is an American typographer and graphic designer who designed several well-known logos, including those for HBO and AC/DC, and publication mastheads such as Time magazine and PC Magazine.

== Biography ==
Huerta was born in 1952, and raised in southern California. He studied at ArtCenter College of Design in Los Angeles, majoring in illustration. Following his graduation in 1974, he moved to New York and worked at CBS Records as a staff album cover designer. In this period, he was involved in creating logos and artwork for musicians and bands such as AC/DC, Willie Nelson, Ted Nugent, Bob Dylan, Alvin Lee, and many others.

1977 logo for AC/DC by Huerta

After leaving CBS to work as an independent designer, Huerta designed lettering for AC/DC's High Voltage and Let There Be Rock albums, the latter later being adopted as the now-iconic AC/DC "lightning bolt" logo. Huerta worked on the branding for the 1980 Clint Eastwood film Bronco Billy, as well as Super Bowl XXVIII, and designed lettering for Super Bowl XXXIV and movies such as Coal Miner's Daughter, Atlantic City, and Star Trek III: The Search For Spock.

Huerta later expanded his output beyond the music recording and movie industries to design marks for Nabisco, Pepsi, the National Guitar Museum, and Swiss Army Brands, for whom he also designed watch faces. He designed the mastheads of Architectural Digest, Time, Money, People, The Atlantic Monthly, PC Magazine, Adweek, Condé Nast's Traveler, Working Mother, The American Lawyer, The National Law Journal, and the Connecticut Post. His typographic work includes corporate fonts for Time-Life, PepsiCo and Condé Nast.

Huerta also designed the stringed instrument known as The Rock Ock for the National Guitar Museum, which is on tour along with other examples of his guitar art.

His work is in the permanent collection of the Museum of Modern Art. In May 2025, the Connecticut Art Directors Club inducted Huerta into the CADC Hall of Fame.
