= Ask Me No Questions =

Ask Me No Questions may refer to:

- "Miss Susie had a steamboat", a schoolyard rhyme
- "Miss Lucy had a baby", a related schoolyard rhyme
- Ask Me No Questions (novel), a novel about Bangladeshi families in the United States
- "Ask Me No Questions" (Frasier), an episode of the television show Frasier
