= National Guitar Museum =

Touring guitar exhibition

- Established: May 7, 2008; 18 years ago
- Type: Music
- Founder: HP Newquist
- Executive Director: HP Newquist
- Curators: Rich Maloof and Pete Prown
- Website: nationalguitarmuseum.com

The National Guitar Museum (NGM) is a museum dedicated to the guitar's history, evolution, and cultural impact; and to promoting and preserving the guitar's legacy. The NGM addresses the history of the guitar as it has evolved from ancient stringed instruments to the wide variety of instruments created over the past 200 years. It focuses on the guitar's inventors, innovators, and influential players, along with the science and technology behind the guitar's construction, shape, and sound.

The NGM does not have a permanent location, but rather exhibits its collection in a touring format.

== Overview ==
The museum was founded by author and former Guitar magazine editor-in-chief HP Newquist, who serves as its executive director. It is the first museum to focus solely on all aspects of the guitar and to include instruments from most of the world's stringed instrument manufacturers. The NGM's collection focuses on representative instruments from a vast array of historical makers and modern luthiers.

The NGM's board of advisors includes guitarists Tony Iommi, Steve Howe, Steve Vai, Ritchie Blackmore, Liona Boyd, Al Di Meola, and Joe Bonamassa. Johnny Winter served on the board prior to his death. Curators include guitar industry veterans Rich Maloof and Pete Prown.

== History ==
In 2011, the NGM collection began touring the United States in a variety of exhibitions.

In 2012, it was announced that at the completion of its exhibition tours, one U.S. city was expected to be chosen as the permanent home of the National Guitar Museum. As of 2024, as a result of the ongoing tours, a permanent home for the NGM has still not been chosen.

== Touring exhibitions ==
=== "GUITAR: The Instrument That Rocked The World" ===
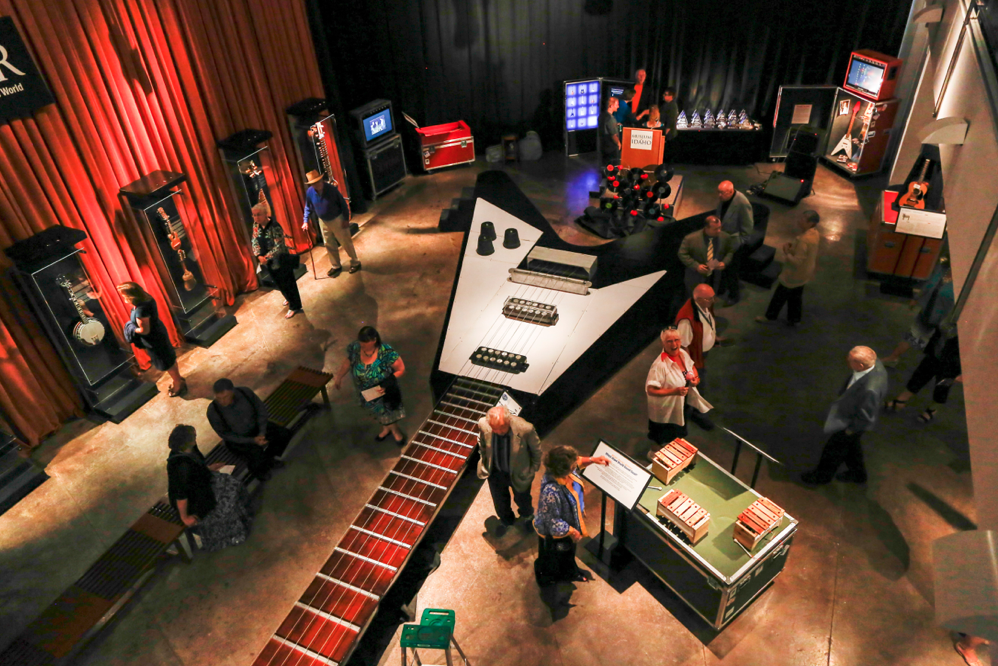
"GUITAR: The Instrument That Rocked The World" exhibit.

In February 2011, the NGM launched its first touring exhibit, entitled "GUITAR: The Instrument That Rocked The World," which began with previews outside New York City. The national rollout was in Orlando, Florida, on June 11, 2011. The exhibit traveled to sites across the United States from 2011 to 2022.

The hosts for the GUITAR Exhibit:

- Discovery Museum and Planetarium (Bridgeport, CT): February 15 – May 15, 2011 (Previews)
- Orlando Science Center (Orlando, FL): June 11, 2011 – January 4, 2012 (National Launch)
- Louisville Science Center (Louisville, KY): January 21 – April 22, 2012
- Kamin Science Center (Pittsburgh, PA): June 16 – September 30, 2012
- Science Museum of Virginia (Richmond, VA): October 13 – January 6, 2013
- The Springfield Science Museum (Springfield, MA): January 18 – April 21, 2013
- The Museum of Idaho (Idaho Falls, ID): June 10 – November 30, 2013
- The Reuben H. Fleet Science Center (San Diego, CA): December 20, 2013 – April 6, 2014
- The Bishop Museum (Honolulu, Hawai’i): May 2014 – September 1, 2014
- Liberty Science Center (Liberty State Park, Jersey City, NJ): October 2014 – January 2015
- Imagination Station (Toledo, OH): February 2015 – May 2015
- Discovery Place (Charlotte, NC): May 31, 2015 – September 2015
- Oregon Museum of Science and Industry (Portland, OR): October 2015 – January 2016
- Exploration Place (Wichita, KS): January 2016 – April 2016
- Whitaker Center (Harrisburg, CA): May 2016 – September 2016
- Gulf Coast Exploreum (Mobile, AL): September 2016 – January 2017
- Buffalo Museum of Science (Buffalo, NY): January 2017 – May 2017
- The Berkshire Museum (Pittsfield, MA): May 2017 – September 2017
- Kalamazoo Valley Museum (Kalamazoo, MI): September 2017 – January 2018
- Fort Worth Museum of Science and History (Fort Worth, TX): January 2018 – May 2018
- Museum of the Rockies (Bozeman, MT): May 2018 – September 2018
- Cincinnati Museum Center (Cincinnati, OH): September 2018 – January 2019
- St. Louis Science Center (St. Louis, MO): January 19 – April 14, 2019
- The History Museum at the Castle (Appleton, WI): May 2019 – January 2020
- McWane Science Center (Birmingham, AL): January 2020 – September 2020
- Peoria Riverfront Museum (Peoria, IL): October 2020 - January 2021
- Durham Museum (Omaha, NE): February 2021 - April 2021
- The Bullock Texas State History Museum (Austin, TX): May 2021 - July 2021
- Denver Museum of Nature and Science (Denver, CO): October 2021 – April 2022
- Kamin Science Center (Pittsburgh, PA): May 2022 – October 2022

=== "Medieval To Metal: The Art & Evolution Of The GUITAR" ===
The NGM curates a touring art exhibition, "Medieval To Metal: The Art & Evolution Of The GUITAR." It debuted at the Leigh Yawkey Woodson Art Museum in Wisconsin in February 2015. It has since been presented at more than a dozen art museums in the United States, including:

- Leigh Yawkey Woodson Art Museum: February 28, 2015 - May 31, 2016
- New Mexico Museum of Art: February 6, 2016 - May 1, 2016
- Sonoma County Museum: May 27, 2016 – September 5, 2016
- The Haggin Museum: October 6, 2016 – January 8, 2017
- Butler Institute of American Art: January 20, 2017 – April 30, 2017
- Saginaw Art Museum: September 29 – January 6, 2017
- Vero Beach Museum of Art: January 27 – May 6, 2018
- The Appleton Museum of Art: May 14 – September 3, 2018
- Fort Wayne Museum of Art: September 29, 2018 – January 6, 2019
- Stamford Museum: February 22 – May 26, 2019
- Currier Museum of Art: June 29 – September 22, 2019
- National Czech & Slovak Museum & Library: October 5, 2019 – January 26, 2020
- The Museum of Texas Tech University: February 9 – May 9, 2020
- Carlsbad Museum: June 22 – September 4, 2020
- Museum of Arts and Sciences (Daytona Beach, FL): September 19 – January 10, 2021
- Buffalo Museum of Science: February 13, 2021 – September 6, 2021
- Reading Public Museum: October 2021 – January 2022
- Lauren Rogers Museum of Art: January 2022 – April 2022
- The Powerhouse Museum: April 2022 – September 2022
- The Midland Libraries: September 2022 — December 2022
- The Juliet Art Museum: February 2022 — May 2023
- The Loveland Museum: June 24 - September 17, 2023
- Whirinaki Whare Taonga (Wellington, New Zealand): May 25 - September 1, 2024
- Art Gallery of Ballarat (Victoria, Australia): October 1, 2024 - February 12, 2025
- William King Museum Of Art: Abingdon, VA: May 21 - August 21, 2025

=== "America At The Crossroads: The GUITAR And A Changing Nation" ===
"America At The Crossroads: The GUITAR And A Changing Nation" is an NGM exhibition focused on U.S. history. It uses the guitar as emblematic, and representative, of pivotal national events. It debuted in January 2023 at the Gerald R. Ford Presidential Library and Museum in Grand Rapids, MI.

Venues

- Gerald R. Ford Presidential Library and Museum, Grand Rapids, MI January - May 2023
- Museum Of Science and History: Memphis, TN June - October 2023
- Carlsbad Museum: Carlsbad, NM November 2023 - January 2024
- Mississippi Arts & Entertainment Experience: Meridian, MS February - May 2024
- California Museum: Sacramento, CA: May 24 - September 1, 2024
- Delta Cultural Center: Helena, AR: September 20, 2024 - January 4, 2025
- The Bishop Museum: Bradenton, FL: January 20 - May 8, 2025
- Museum Of The Mississippi Delta: May 19 - September 6, 2025
- Tampa Bay History Center: January 31 - August 23, 2026
- Turtle Bay Museum: September 8 - December 28, 2026

=== "SHAPE SHIFTING: The GUITAR As Modern ARTifact" ===
"SHAPE SHIFTING: The GUITAR As Modern ARTifact" is an NGM exhibition focused on the design and evolution of the electric guitar since the 1930s. It follows the creation of the electric guitar and its various shapes, materials, and colors over the past century while presenting it as one of the most important pop culture icons of the past 70 years. It debuted in September 2025 at the Museum Of Texas Tech.

Venues

- Museum Of Texas Tech: September 13, 2025 - January 11, 2026
- Kalamazoo Valley Museum: January 24 - April 26, 2026

== Lifetime achievement award ==
The NGM presents an annual "Lifetime Achievement Award" to a guitarist who has been instrumental to the legacy of the guitar. The recipients to date have been:

- 2010: David Honeyboy Edwards.
- 2011: Roger McGuinn of The Byrds.
- 2012: B.B. King, "King of the Blues"
- 2013: Vic Flick, the session guitarist who played on thousands of early British Invasion songs, known for performing the original James Bond theme song.
- 2014: Buddy Guy, pioneering Chicago electric blues guitarist.
- 2015: Tony Iommi, guitarist and founder of Black Sabbath, acknowledged as the creator of heavy metal.
- 2016: Glen Campbell, singer-performer and notable session guitarist, his TV show helped popularize the acoustic-electric guitar.
- 2017: Bonnie Raitt, blues guitarist and singer, one of the electric guitar's foremost slide players.
- 2018: José Feliciano, multi-genre guitarist and internationally renowned performer.
- 2019: Liona Boyd, classical guitarist.
- 2020: Eddie Van Halen, In Memoriam.
- 2021: Al di Meola, noted jazz, fusion, and world music guitarist.
- 2022: Jeff Beck, innovative electric guitar pioneer.
- 2023: Tommy Emmanuel, fingerstyle master and Certified Guitar Player.
- 2024: Alex Lifeson, progressive hard rock guitarist and founder of Rush.
- 2025: Ritchie Blackmore, virtuosic guitar who founded Deep Purple, Rainbow, and Blackmore's Night.

== See also ==
- List of music museums
