= Paul Guermonprez =

Belgian and Dutch artist (1908–1944)

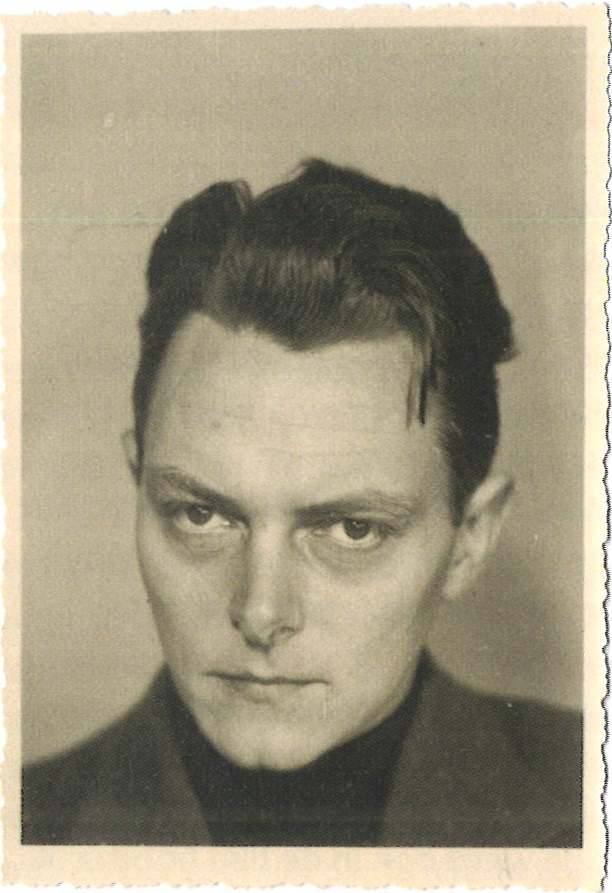
- Paul Guermonprez (1935)
- Born: Paul Gustave Sidonie Guermonprez; 28 December 1908; Ghent, Belgium
- Died: 10 June 1944 (aged 35); Overveen, Netherlands
- Education: Bauhaus Dessau
- Spouse: Trude Guermonprez (m. 1939)
- Relatives: Heinrich Jalowetz (father-in-law)

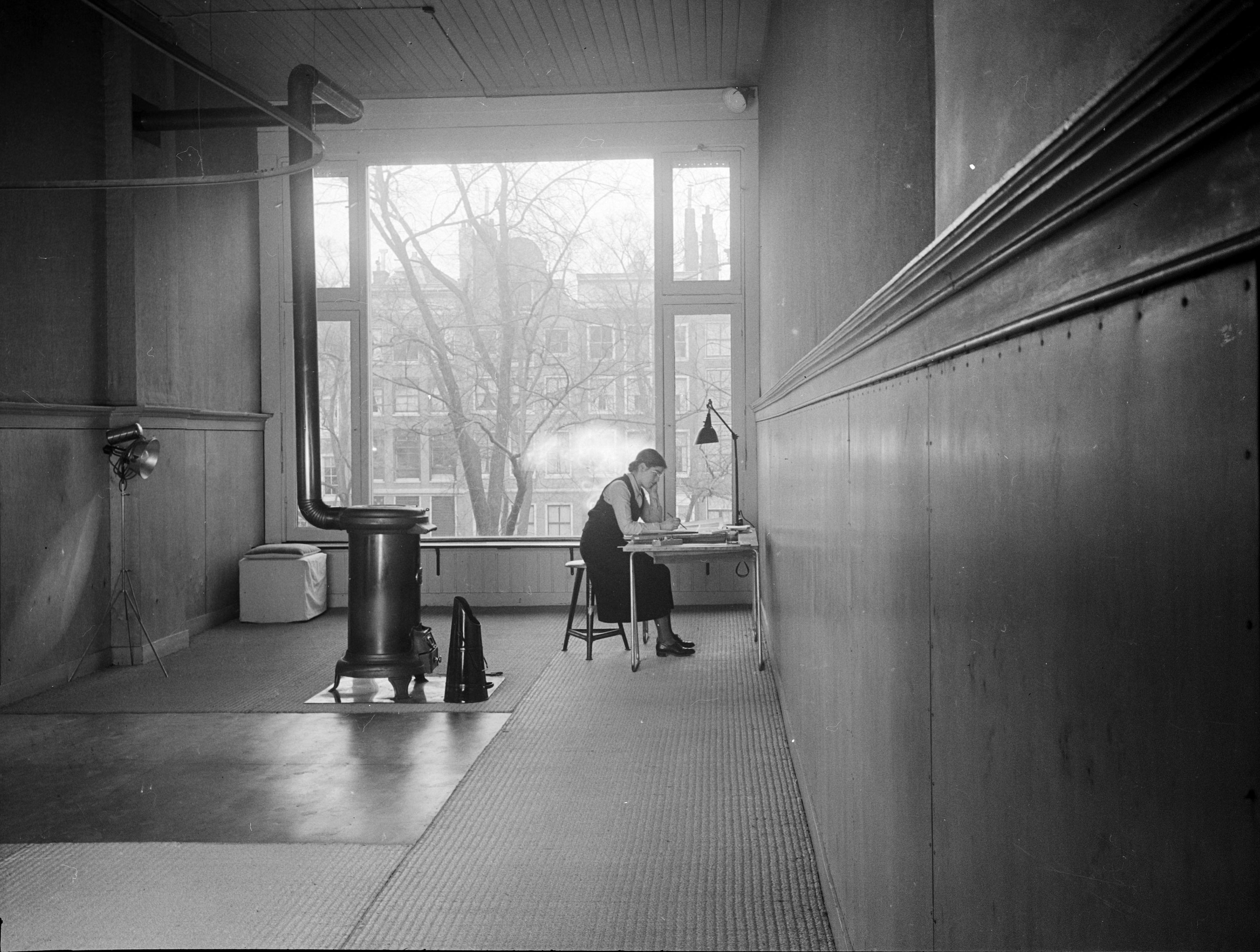
Trude Guermonprez in the studio of Co-op 2 (1937), Amsterdam

Paul Gustave Sidonie Guermonprez (28 December 1908 – 10 June 1944) was a Belgian and Dutch photographer, graphic designer, and a Dutch resistance fighter during World War II.

== Early life and education ==
Paul Guermonprez was born 28 December 1908 in Ghent, Belgium. His family fled during World War I, eventually resettling in the Netherlands. Guermonprez attended the De Suikerschool Amsterdam, after primary school. From 1929 to 1932, he worked on a sugar plantation in the Dutch East Indies (now Indonesia).

In 1932, he attended Bauhaus Dessau in Germany before the schools closure, studying with photographer Walter Peterhans. In 1933, Guermonprez moved back to the Netherlands because of the rise in Nazi Germany. After moving to Amsterdam he worked as a Commercial artist, founded his advertising company Co-op 2, and he taught classes at the recently established New Art School, Amsterdam (Nieuwe Kunstschool, Amsterdam). In 1939, he married textile artist Trude Guermonprez.

== Career and World War II ==
When war broke out in 1939, he was drafted as an officer in the Dutch army. By 1940, Germany occupied the Netherlands, and Guermonprez was no longer in military service. Due to the Nederlandsche Kultuurkamer, an institute enforced by the German Nazis that required creative professionals to register their activities, Guermonprez closed his company Co-op 2 in 1942 in protest. For three weeks in 1941 he was arrested.

From 4 May 1942 to 30 July 1943 he was held hostage in the Kamp Sint-Michielsgestel. After his conditional release, he and his Jewish wife, Trude Jalowetz, went into hiding with the help of the Dutch resistance. They fled to Maria Helena Friedlander (nee Bruhn), a German woman, wife of Henri Friedlaender. She hid them with other fugitives in the attic of her house in Wassenaar, South Holland.

== Death ==
He was arrested in 1944 and executed on 10 June 1944 in Overveen. After the war, Guermonprez was buried in the Dutch Honorary Cemetery Bloemendaal (Erebegraafplaats Bloemendaal). He was awarded the Dutch Cross of Resistance (Verzetskruis 1940–1945) posthumously on 9 May 1946.

The Stedelijk Museum Amsterdam has many of his photography works in their permanent collection.
