= Marina Budhos =

American writer

- Born: March 3, 1960 (age 66); Queens, New York, United States
- Education: Cornell University; Brown University
- Occupations: Writer; educator
- Spouse: Marc Aronson (m. 1997)
- Relatives: Boris Aronson (father-in-law)
- Website: marinabudhos.com

Marina Budhos (born March 3, 1960) is an American writer and educator.

== Early life and education ==
Marina Tamar Budhos was born on March 3, 1960, in Queens, New York to Walter Budhos, a math teacher, and Shirley Budhos, an English teacher. Budhos' father was Indo-Guyanese father and her mother was Jewish American.

Budhos attended Cornell University where she graduated magna cum laude in English. She then completed her master's degree at Brown University.

== Career ==
Budhos has been published in numerous publications, including The Nation, Ms. Magazine, LitHub, Ploughshares, The Kenyon Review and Asian Pacific American Journal. Budhos has won several awards for her writing. She received an NEA in Literature, an EMMA (Exceptional Merit Media Award), and a Rona Jaffe Award for Women Writers. She has also been honored with an Asian/Pacific American Award for Literature and a Walter Award. Budhos won three Fellowships from New Jersey's Council on the Arts.

Budhos went to India as a Fulbright Scholar and is currently a professor emerita at William Paterson University. She has taught at Columbia University, Vassar College, Eugene Lang College of Liberal Arts, The New School, and the City College of New York.

== Personal life ==
On September 14, 1997, Budhos married Marc Aronson. Budhos is the daughter-in-law of Boris Aronson.

== Bibliography ==
- House of Waiting, Global City Press (New York, NY), 1995.
- The Professor of Light, Putnam (New York, NY), 1999.
- Remix: Conversations with Immigrant Teenagers, Holt (New York, NY), 1999.
- Ask Me No Questions, Atheneum (New York, NY), 2006.
- Tell Us We're Home, Atheneum (New York, NY), 2010.
- Sugar Changed the World: A Story of Magic, Spice, Slavery, Freedom & Science, (co-author, Marc Aronson) Houghton Mifflin (New York, NY), 2010.
- Watched, Wendy Lamb Books/Random House (New York, NY), 2016.
- Eyes of the World: Robert Capa, Gerda Taro & The Invention of Modern Photojournalism, (co-author, Marc Aronson), Henry Holt (New York, NY), 2017.
- The Long Ride, Wendy Lamb Books/Random House (New York, NY), 2019.
- We Are All We Have, Wendy Lamb Books/Random House (New York, NY), 2022
