= HP Newquist =

American author

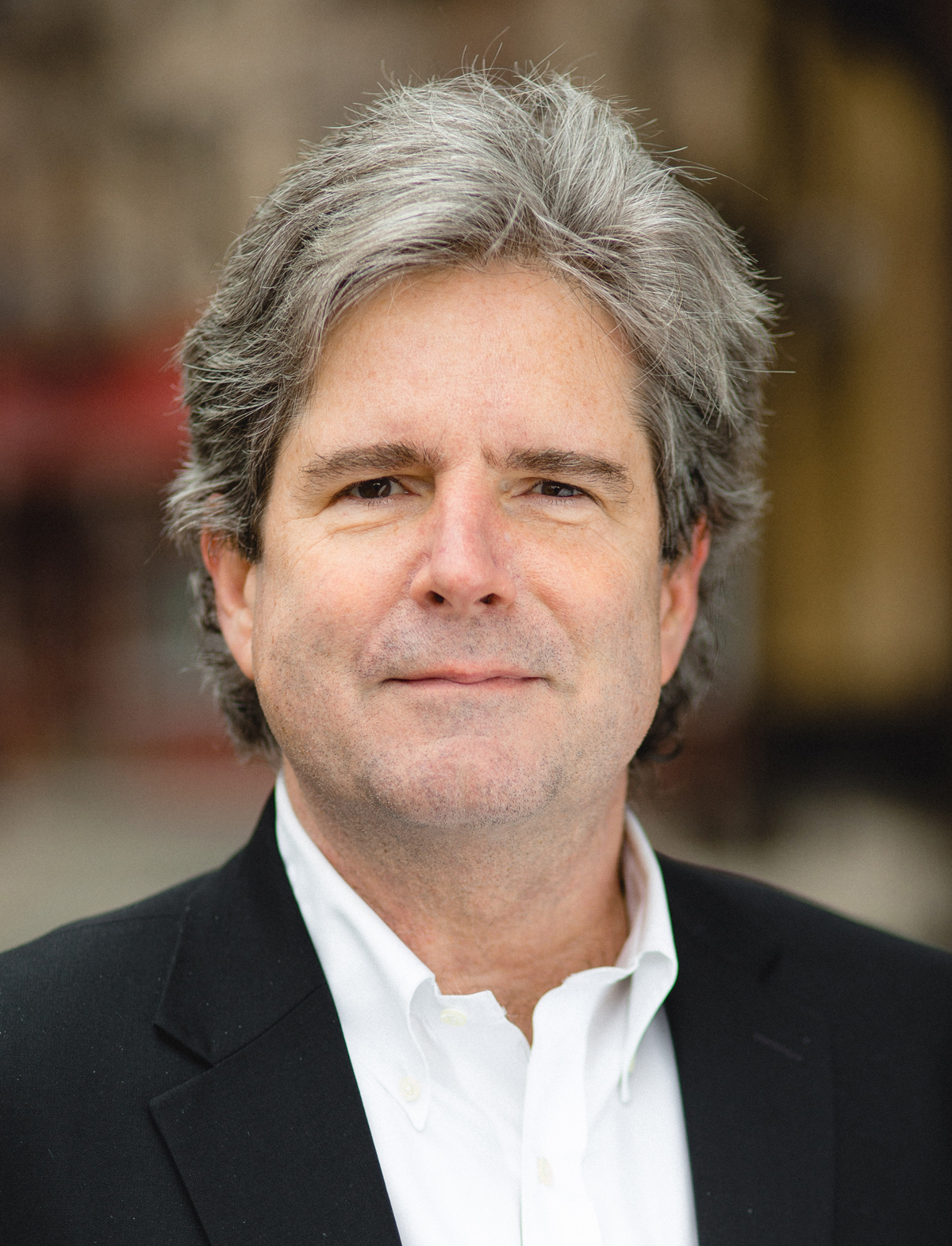
- HP Newquist
- Born: Utica, New York
- Occupations: Writer, musician, museum founder and director
- Known for: National Guitar Museum
- Notable work: The Book of Blood; The Brain Makers; Here There be Monsters; The Book of Chocolate; BEHEMOTH; Scene of the Crime; Ten Years Gone
- Awards: NSTA Best STEM Books; Bank Street College Of Education: The Best Children's Books Of The Year; Magnolia Award
- Website: www.newquist.net

HP Newquist is an American author whose books cover topics from medicine and music to technology and terror. He is also a museum curator and musician, and has worked as a columnist, publisher, industry analyst, speaker, and director.

== Career ==
In the late 1980s and 1990s, Newquist was an advanced technology business analyst in the artificial intelligence industry. He was editor and publisher of Artificial Intelligence Trends for ten years, earning him the title "Dean of AI". During that time, he was also a columnist for several high technology publications, including Computerworld, Expert Systems Journal, and AI Expert magazine. Newquist was the chairman of the Artificial Intelligence & Advanced Technology Conference 1987 and the Society for Machine Intelligence's Expert Systems Conference 1987. The AI timeline he developed for his book The Brain Makers is frequently cited as a map of the rise and fall of the artificial intelligence industry.

During the 1990s, Newquist was the editor-in-chief of Guitar Magazine, and wrote the Disney Channel documentary episode Going Home featuring Robbie Robertson of The Band. He also directed A Portrait, a documentary featuring John Denver. Newquist's writing has appeared in dozens of publications, including The New York Times, Billboard, Newsweek, New York Press, Datamation, InTune, Computer Business Review, Guitar Player, Vintage Guitar, and Gulf Air. He has been a featured speaker at numerous events in Europe, Asia, and North America.

Apart from his writing, he is founder — and currently oversees the development — of the National Guitar Museum (NGM), the first museum dedicated to the evolution and cultural impact of the guitar, which was unveiled in August 2010. Newquist curated the NGM's traveling exhibits, "GUITAR: The Instrument That Rocked The World," "Medieval To Metal: The Art & Evolution Of The GUITAR," and “America At The Crossroads: The GUITAR And A Changing Nation,” which have been touring the United States since 2011 and have been installed in more than fifty separate museum locations. He has been featured on BBC, NPR, Radio New Zealand, and other programs covering the history of the guitar.

== Works ==
Newquist has written works of both fiction and non-fiction. They include the award-winning The Great Brain Book: An Inside Look At The Inside Of Your Head, cited as an outstanding science book by the National Science Teachers Association and the Children's Book Council. His 2012 book, The Book Of Blood, was a finalist for the American Association for the Advancement of Science's "Science Books & Films Prize For Excellence In Science". His book For Boys Only: The Biggest, Baddest Book Ever, with Marc Aronson, was selected as a singular book for "The Teen Age" by the New York Public Library. In 2018, the NSTA and CBC awarded two of his books as among the best 21 STEM books of the year. Newquist is a five-time award winner of the "Outstanding Science Book", presented by the National Science Teachers Association. His short stories and essays have been collected in numerous anthologies.

Newquist was editor-in-chief of the Artificial Intelligence Trends publications beginning in 1984. His involvement in the AI industry now spans four decades of journalism and analysis. He has written hundreds of essays and articles on AI, and curated the museum exhibition, “AI: Your Mind & The Machine,” which is currently touring the United States.

His first novel, BEHEMOTH, a tale of suspense and terror, was published by Bloodshot Books in Fall 2019. According to The Horror Review, "BEHEMOTH is old-school gothic horror, historical horror mixed with modern-world superstitions and prejudices, and that makes things that much more chilling. Newquist has created a fine horror novel that dares to be called literary/historical fiction and entertains the reader from start to finish." Cemetery Dance magazine wrote that "BEHEMOTH is a thriller-style creature feature . . . Newquist is a great writer." His second work of fiction, a thriller entitled Ten Years Gone, was published in November 2021. Kendall Reviews rated it as one of "Top Reads Of 2021," stating the book "is pedal to the metal from Page One and showcases just how fantastic an author Newquist is."

Newquist's first long form musical work, “Symphony For Artificial Intelligence (Overture)” was published in 2023 on SoundCloud.

== Bibliography ==
- The Book of Blood, (Houghton Mifflin Harcourt) awarded "An Outstanding Science Book for Students K–12: 2013" by the National Science Teachers Association. According to the judging panel: "This will appeal to a wide audience and does a good job of describing many anecdotes about blood—even why the myth of vampires persisted in history." The book was a finalist for the American Association for the Advancement of Science's "Science Books & Films Prize For Excellence In Science", and was included in the organization's Best of 2013 List. It also won the 2014 Magnolia Award, the Children's Choice Award for the State of Mississippi.
- The Great Brain Book (Scholastic)
- Here There be Monsters, (Houghton Mifflin Harcourt) nominated upon its release for a New England Booksellers Award
- The Book of Chocolate, (Viking) NSTA Best Stem Books 2018 award winner, and a Junior Library Guild selection
- This Will Kill You: A Guide to the Ways in Which We Go, with Rich Maloof (St. Martin's Press)
- The Way They Play Series (including Blues Masters, Hard Rock Masters, Metal Masters, Acoustic Masters), with Rich Maloof (Backbeat Books)
- The Brain Makers (Prentice Hall/SAMS/Relayer Books)
- Virtual Reality (Scholastic)
- Yahoo! The Ultimate Desk Reference to the Web (HarperCollins)
- Financial Technology Watch Series, (Lafferty) (including Emerging Technologies For Financial Institutions, Financial Services Technology Watch I & II)
- GUITAR: The Instrument That Rocked The World (Relayer Books)
- Legends Of Rock Guitar, with Pete Prown (Hal Leonard)
- Music & Technology (Billboard Books)
- From Here To There: Invention & Impact, (Viking/Smithsonian) NSTA Best Stem Books 2018 award winner, Junior Library Guild selection and VOYA Nonfiction Honor List Award 2018
- Space: The Next Business Frontier (Pocket Books)
- Abracadabra: The Story Of Magic Through The Ages (Henry Holt)
- The Human Body: Invention & Impact, (Viking/Smithsonian) The Best Children's Books Of The Year 2016 award winner, Center For Children's Literature, Bank Street College Of Education
- Scene Of The Crime (Viking). NSTA Best Stem Books 2022 award winner and Junior Library Guild selection. School Library Journal stated that "Newquist presents a compulsively readable narrative of the evolution of cracking cases . . . a recommended scientific foundation for audiences interested in crime dramas and true crime."
- BEHEMOTH (Bloodshot Books)
- Ten Years Gone (Relayer Books)
- Medieval to Metal: The Art and Evolution of the Guitar (Art Gallery Of Ballarat) with Louise Tegart
- Puncture (Relayer Books)

=== Anthologies ===
- Suburban Nightmares (Hellbound Books, 2025)
- CryoPod Tapes (Episode 20, 2022)
- Old Scratch: Demon Tales Anthology (Crimson Pinnacle Press, 2022)
- Books Of Horror, Volume 3 (BOH Publishing, 2021)
- Led Zeppelin On Led Zeppelin (Chicago Review Press, 2014)
- Bowie On Bowie (Chicago Review Press, 2015)
- Eddie Van Halen (Neil Zlozower, Chronicle Books, 2012)
- CYBERLIFE (Pearson/SAMS, 1994)

== Awards ==
- NSTA Best Stem Books 2022 (Scene Of The Crime)
- VOYA Nonfiction Honor List Award 2018 (From Here To There: Invention & Impact)
- NSTA Best Stem Books 2018 (The Book Of Chocolate)
- NSTA Best Stem Books 2018 (From Here To There: Invention & Impact)
- Best Children's Books Of The Year 2018, Center For Children's Literature 2X (The Book Of Chocolate, From Here To There: Invention & Impact)
- Best Children's Books Of The Year 2016, Center For Children's Literature (The Human Body: Invention & Impact)
- Magnolia Award 2014 (The Book Of Blood)
- AAAS Science Books & Films Prize For Excellence In Science, Best Of 2013 (The Book Of Blood)
- NSTA Outstanding Science Book for Students: 2013 (The Book Of Blood)
- New York Public Library "Books For The Teen Age": 2008 (For Boys Only)
- NSTA Outstanding Science Book for Students: 2006 (The Great Brain Book)
