= Boris Aronson =

Russian-American scenic designer (1898–1980)

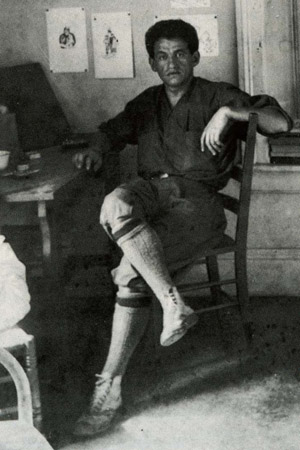
- Aronson in New York, 1920
- Born: Borech-Ber Aronsson; October 15, 1898; Kiev, Russian Empire
- Died: 16 November 1980 (aged 82); New York City, New York, US
- Other name: Boris Solomonovich Aronsson
- Spouse: Lisa Jalowetz (m. 1945)
- Children: Marc Aronson
- Relatives: Heinrich Jalowetz (father-in-law); Trude Guermonprez (sister-in-law); Marina Budhos (daughter-in-law)

Boris Aronson (October 15, 1898 – November 16, 1980) was a Russian-American scenic designer for Broadway and Yiddish theatre. He won the Tony Award for Scenic Design six times in his career.

== Biography ==
Borech-Ber Aronsson was born on October 15, 1898 in Kiev, the capital of Kiev Governorate within the Russian Empire (present-day Ukraine) to Rabbi Shlomo HaCohen Aronson.

Aronson enrolled in art school during his youth. Aronson became an apprentice to the designer Aleksandra Ekster, who introduced him to the directors Vsevolod Meyerhold and Alexander Tairov, who influenced him. These three theatre and art veterans were advocates of the Constructivist school in Russia, as opposed to Stanislavski's form of Realism, and they convinced Aronson to embrace the Constructivist style.

Aronson worked for some years in Moscow and Germany. In Berlin he exhibited at the seminal Van Diemen Gallery "First Exhibition of Russian Art", alongside the Constructivists El Lissitzky and Naum Gabo, which introduced Constructivism to the West. He wrote two books in Berlin, on Marc Chagall and Jewish graphic art, before he obtained an Immigrant Visa for America in 1923. He moved to the Lower East Side in New York City and began designing sets and costumes for the more experimental of the city's Yiddish theatres, including the Unser Theater, the Schildkraut Theatre, and most notably Maurice Schwartz's Yiddish Art Theatre. He achieved fame in New York's Jewish community when he designed Schwartz's 1926 revival of Abraham Goldfaden's play The Tenth Commandment. Although he shunned politics, Aronson produced sets for the Communist affiliated ARTEF (Arbeiter Teater Farband, Workers' Theatre Union), such as Lag Boymer and Jim Kooperkop in 1930. However, he soon after left the Yiddish Theatre to prevent his work's "ghettoization", and debuted on Broadway, in 1932, with a revival of Vernon Duke and Yip Harburg's Walk a Little Faster. During the 1930s, he worked on productions by the Group Theatre, including works by Clifford Odets and Irwin Shaw.

From 1934 to 1952, Aronson designed scenes, costumes, and lighting for thirty-four plays and three musicals on Broadway (including his design for what is considered to be the first "concept musical", Kurt Weill and Alan Jay Lerner's Love Life), but those successes were overshadowed by his work for the original 1953 production of The Crucible and the 1955 The Diary of Anne Frank (a play by Frances Goodrich and Albert Hackett based on Anne Frank: The Diary of a Young Girl). He continued work on Broadway into the 1960s and 1970s with musicals including Do Re Mi, Fiddler on the Roof (for which Aronson returned to his earlier experience with Jewish theatre), Cabaret, Zorba, Company, Follies, A Little Night Music, and Pacific Overtures. He won the Drama Desk Award for Outstanding Set Design three times.

Aronson designed sets for the Metropolitan Opera and ballet companies, including the production of The Nutcracker choreographed by Mikhail Baryshnikov. He was also a non-theatrical artist, working as a painter and sculptor. At the time of his death in 1980, he was a member of New York's theatre and art community and one of its designers. Aronson's wife was Lisa Jalowetz, who worked on many of Aronson's shows as his assistant.

In 1979, a year before his death, Aronson was inducted into the American Theater Hall of Fame.

== Comments by directors and designers ==
"For Company, Harold Prince and Aronson had discussed at length a Francis Bacon painting * of a figure in motion behind a steel-and-glass coffee table. They decided that it captured the 'frantic, anxious, driven' quality of urban life, and ... Aronson presented Prince with that famous chrome-and-glass backdrop. ... Aronson had made a study of how many buttons he pushed on an average day in New York City ... Prince ... was delighted to find that Aronson had given him two working elevators to play with."

"Michael Bennett ... was astonished that Aronson 'didn't do three projects at once', as many designers did, but instead 'watched every line change every night.' The veteran lighting designer Tharon Musser ... felt that she learned more from Aronson than from any other set designer in her long career. 'His design concepts were so strong that if someone went against them, the show would be ruined.'

== Personal life ==
In 1945, Aronson married the designer Lisa Aronson (née Jalowetz; 1920–2013), with whom he had Marc Aronson. Lisa Aronson supported Aronson with the design of many of his productions.

Aronson was the son-in-law of Heinrich Jalowetz, a conductor, and the brother-in-law of Trude Guermonprez, a textile artist, designer and educator. Aronson was the father-in-law of Marina Budhos.

== Tony awards ==
Set design model for original 1976 production of Pacific Overtures.

- 1951 Season in the Sun, The Rose Tattoo and The Country Girl - winner
- 1956 The Diary of Anne Frank, A View from the Bridge, Once Upon A Tailor and Bus Stop - nominee
- 1957 A Hole in the Head and Small War on Murray Hill - nominee
- 1958 The Rope Dancers, Orpheus Descending and A Hole in the Head - nominee
- 1959 J.B. - nominee
- 1965 Fiddler on the Roof - nominee
- 1967 Cabaret - winner
- 1968 The Price - nominee
- 1969 Zorba - winner
- 1971 Company - winner
- 1972 Follies - winner
- 1973 A Little Night Music - nominee
- 1976 Pacific Overtures - winner

== Selected Broadway credits ==
- Small Miracle (1934)
- Awake and Sing! (1935)
- The Merchant of Yonkers (1938) (the play which eventually became The Matchmaker and, later, the musical Hello, Dolly!)
- Ladies and Gentlemen (1939)
- Cabin in the Sky (1940)
- Sadie Thompson (1944)
- The Desert Song (1946) (revival)
- I Am a Camera (1951)
- The Creation of the World and Other Business (1972)
