= Trude Guermonprez =

German and American artist (1910–1976)

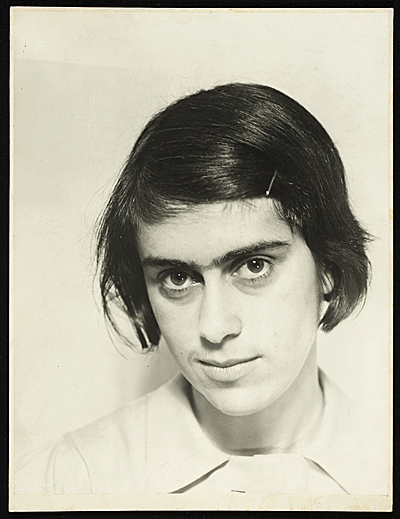
- Photo from 1938, by Paul Guermonprez
- Born: Gertrud Emilie Jalowetz; 9 November 1910; Danzig, German Empire (now Gdańsk, Poland)
- Died: 8 May 1976 (aged 65); San Francisco, California, US
- Other name: Gertrud Emilie Jalowetz Guermonprez Elsesser
- Education: Burg Giebichenstein University of Art and Design
- Known for: Weaving
- Spouse(s): Paul Guermonprez (m. 1939; died 1944) John Elsesser (m. 1951)
- Father: Heinrich Jalowetz
- Relatives: Boris Aronson (brother in law)

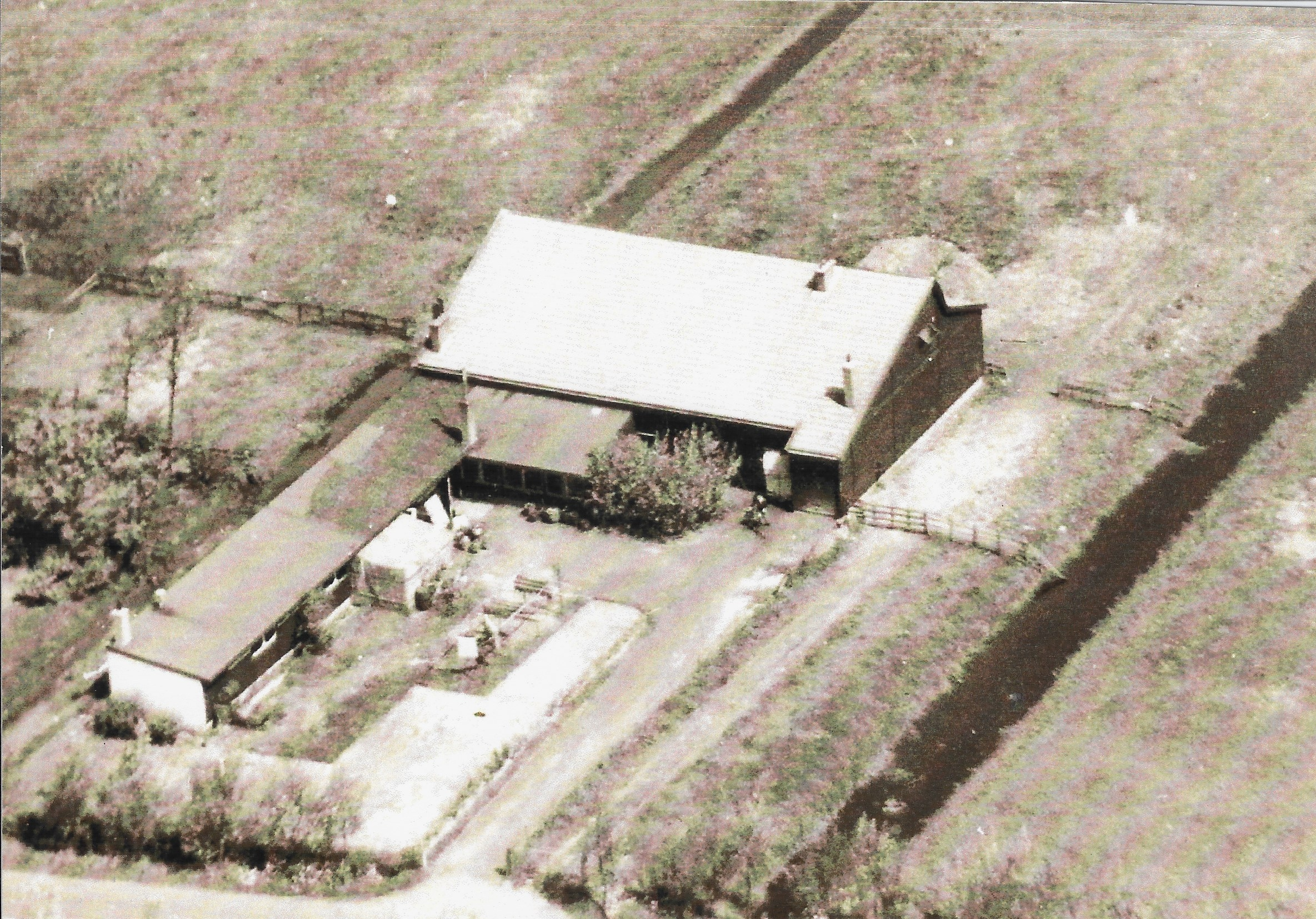
Main building ‘Het Paapje’ with an extension for screen printing

Trude Guermonprez (born Gertrud Emilie Jalowetz; 1910 –1976), was a German and American textile artist, designer and educator, known for her tapestry landscapes. Her Bauhaus-influenced disciplined abstraction for hand woven textiles greatly contributed to the American craft and fiber art movements of the 1950s–1970s, particularly during her tenure at the California College of Arts and Crafts.

== Early life and education ==
Gertrud Emilie Jalowetz was born on 9 November 1910 in Danzig, German Empire (modern Gdańsk, Poland). Her parents were Austrian and were active in the arts. Her mother was Johanna Jalowetz (née Groag), was a voice teacher and bookbinder and her father was Heinrich Jalowetz was a musicologist and conductor. We can assume that Trude Guermonprez was inspired by the revolutionary artistic surroundings of her parents, while working at Het Paapje designing different textiles.

She learned weaving while living in Halle, where she attended Burg Giebichenstein University of Art and Design (School of Fine and Applied Arts in Halle-Saale). Guermonprez studied textiles in Halle under Benita Otte. By 1933, she had received a degree from the Textile Engineering School in Berlin and scholarship to further her studies in Sweden and Finland.

== Career ==
In 1933, she joined the handknitting tapestry and weaving enterprise Het Paapje in Voorschoten, the Netherlands. Guermonprez was working for five years and 7 months at Het Paapje, while she was living in Wassenaar.

=== World War II ===
Her parents visited Het Paapje in 1939. Because they were Jewish they were fleeing the Nazis. They settled in the United States to teach at Black Mountain College near Asheville, North Carolina. She married a Bauhaus trained photographer in 1939, Paul Guermonprez, and they lived together in the Netherlands. Paul Guermonprez was working as a graphic designer and founded his own advertising company Co-op 2, prior to getting drafted for the Dutch army. By 1940, Germany occupied the Netherlands.

Paul Guermonprez died in 1944 by Nazi execution, while fighting in the Dutch resistance. Hereafter, Trude Jalowetz consequently named herself Trude Guermonprez. She went into hiding until the end of World War II.

=== Black Mountain College ===
She moved to the United States in 1947, with the support of Anni Albers. Guermonprez started her teaching career in the 1940s at Black Mountain College. In 1947, Guermonprez began teaching weaving and design at Black Mountain College while Anni Albers was away on sabbatical, and to be with her mother Johanna Jalowetz and sister Lisa Aronson, who were also at the school. Upon Anni's return, Guermonprez was asked to continue as a full-time faculty member. She remained at Black Mountain College until the dissolution of the weaving program in 1949.

=== Pond Farm Workshops and San Francisco ===
After leaving Black Mountain college, Guermonprez moved West and joined the Pond Farm artist collective run by Bauhaus-trained ceramicist Marguerite Wildenhain in Guerneville, California, and taught at the Pond Farm Workshops. While at Pond Farms she met John Elsesser.

By March 24, 1951, she married John Elsesser (1897–1991), a carpenter and furniture builder. The couple moved to San Francisco, living at 810 Clipper Street in an older home her husband had restored. By December 1952, she had naturalized in the United States.

=== California College of the Arts ===
In 1954, Guermonprez joined the faculty of California College of the Arts (CCA, formerly California College of Arts and Crafts). By 1960, she served as the Chair of the Crafts Department at CCA, overseeing: metal arts, ceramics, glass blowing, stitchery and textile printing, as well as supervising the weaving curriculum. Her students included Kay Sekimachi Stocksdale, Sheila O'Hara, Ann Wilson, and Jane Lackey, among others.

She additionally worked teaching at Oakland College, and at the San Francisco Art Institute.

== Textiles ==
Throughout her career, the majority of her work was private commission. She sometimes worked with her husband John Elsesser who would build furniture, and Guermonprez would create textiles for upholstery.

Guermonprez combined the painterly possibilities of silkscreen with the structural geometry implicit in warp and weft to create fiber wall hangings that are both texturally rich and delicately drawn. She was also known to paint directly on the warp.

Guermonprez had two solo exhibits at the De Young Museum, one in 1964 and one 1970. Guermonprez was awarded the Craftsmanship Medal of the American Institute of Architects (1970) for her "distinguished creative design" in textiles and weaving. She was a fellow at the American Craft Council (1975). Her work was included in the 2024 exhibition Making Their Mark: Works from the Shah Garg Collection at the Berkeley Art Museum and Pacific Film Archive (BAMPFA).

== Death and legacy ==
Guermonprez died on 8 May 1976, after a short illness at Mount Zion Hospital in San Francisco, California.

Guermonprez's work is included in four Dutch museum collections; she worked at the handweaving enterprise Het Paapje in Voorschoten’, the Netherlands, from 1933 onwards for 5 years and 7 months, including The Museum Boymans van Beuningen, Rotterdam, The Textile museum, Tilburg, The Voorschotens Museum, Voorschoten, The Art museum, The Hague, among others.

Posthumously she had a solo exhibition at the Oakland Museum of California, The Tapestries of Trude Guermonprez (1982).
