= Heinrich Jalowetz =

Austrian conductor (1882–1946)

- Born: December 3, 1882; Brünn, Kingdom of Bohemia, Austria-Hungary
- Died: February 2, 1946 (aged 63); Black Mountain, North Carolina, U.S.
- Spouse: Johanna Groag (m. 1908)
- Relatives: Trude Guermonprez (daughter), Boris Aronson (son-in-law), Paul Guermonprez (son-in-law), Marc Aronson (grandson)

Heinrich Jalowetz (December 3, 1882 – February 2, 1946) was an Austrian musicologist and conductor, who settled in the United States. He was among the musicians associated with Arnold Schoenberg and the Second Viennese School.

== Biography ==
Heinrich Jalowetz was born on December 3, 1882, in Brünn, Kingdom of Bohemia, Austria-Hungary, to Jewish parents Emilie Jalowetz (née Deutsch) and Julius Jalowetz. A musicology pupil of Guido Adler, Jalowetz was among Arnold Schoenberg's first students in Vienna, 1904–1908. He completed his doctorate degree in 1908, with a dissertation on Ludwig van Beethoven's early techniques in melody. In 1908, he married Johanna Groag.

From 1909 to 1933, he worked as a conductor in Regensburg, Danzig, Stettin, Prague, Vienna and Cologne (as successor to Otto Klemperer). In 1933, he left Germany and moved to Prague with his wife because of the rise of anti-semitism in Nazi Germany.

After emigrating to the United States in 1938, he taught at Black Mountain College, North Carolina. Though his name is less widely known than that of many of Schoenberg's more famous students, Schoenberg regarded Jalowetz very highly indeed. He is one of the seven "dead friends" (the others being Alban Berg, Anton Webern, Alexander Zemlinsky, Franz Schreker, Karl Kraus and Adolf Loos) to whom he once envisaged dedicating his book Style and Idea, with the comment that those men "belong to those with whom principles of music, art, artistic morality and civic morality need not be discussed. There was a silent and sound mutual understanding on all these matters".

Jalowetz died on February 2, 1946, in Black Mountain, North Carolina, United States.
