= For Boys Only =

2007 non-fiction book by Marc Aronson and HP Newquist

For Boys Only: The Biggest, Baddest Book Ever
- First edition cover
- Author: Marc Aronson and HP Newquist
- Genre: Middle grade nonfiction
- Publisher: Feiwel & Friends
- Publication date: November 27, 2007
- ISBN: 9780312377069

For Boys Only: The Biggest, Baddest Book Ever is a 2007 non-fiction book by Marc Aronson and HP Newquist. The book has 100 short articles on subjects that appeal to boys, such as biting spiders, Easter Island, invisibility cloaks, and fake blood. It also includes a set of 39 codes for the reader to solve, which vary in difficulty.

== Reception ==
A review in Booklist praised the book's lighthearted and humorous approach, noting its diverse collection of puzzles, codes, historical trivia, and practical advice. The reviewer commended the work for engaging young male readers, while observing that its appeal extended to all genders despite its targeted title.

Publishers Weekly wrote that "this graphically fresh and topically diverse collection should capture the imagination of its target audience."

A New York Times review said, "The overall problem with all this mountainous stuff, thunked helter-skelter into these boy books, whether Roarke’s Drift, Andrewsarchus Mongoliensis (a giant wolf-like animal that may have eaten beached whales), the invention of the juice-box (1980) or strategies for winning at rock-paper-scissors: It all cooks up into a saltless stew that won't offend the palates of kids or chickens."

It was also reviewed in School Library Journal, and was an American Library Association Quick Picks for Reluctant Young Adult Readers selection.

The book is part of the New York Public Library's "Books For The Teenage."
