= Marc Aronson =

American historian and writer (born 1950)

Marc Henry Aronson
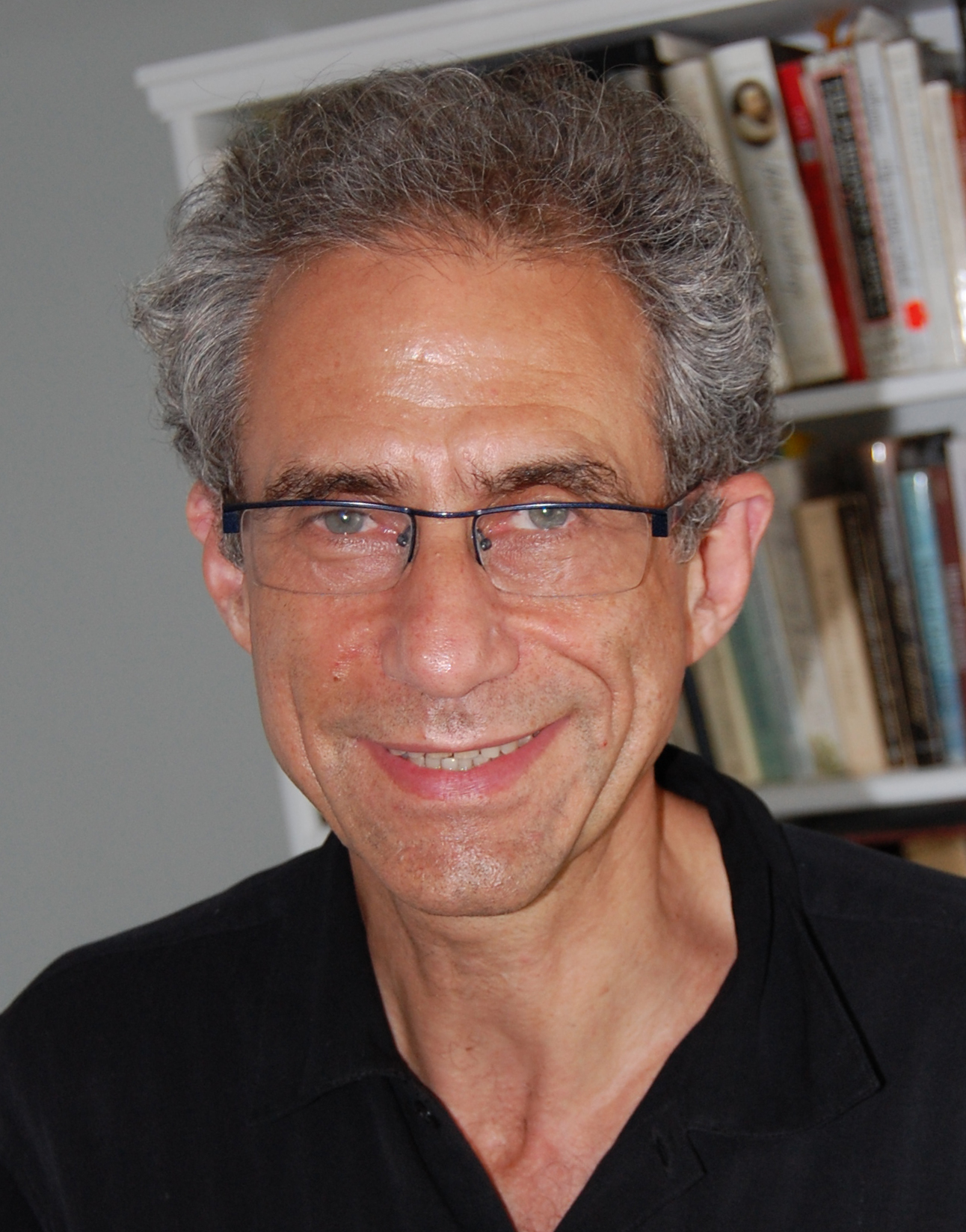
- Born: October 19, 1950 (age 75)
- Education: New York University (Ph.D.)
- Occupations: Writer, editor, publisher, speaker, and historian
- Spouse: Marina Budhos (m. 1997)
- Children: 2
- Relatives: Boris Aronson (father); Heinrich Jalowetz (grandfather)
- Writing career
- Notable awards: Sibert Medal (2001)

Marc Henry Aronson (born October 19, 1950) is an American writer, editor, publisher, speaker, and historian. He has written history and biography nonfiction books for children and young adults, as well as nonfiction books for adults about teenage readers.

== Biography ==
Marc Henry Aronson was born October 19, 1950, the son of the scenic designers Boris Aronson and Lisa Jalowetz Aronson. He is the grandson of rabbi Solomon Aronson, and of the musical conductor Heinrich Jalowetz.

As of June 2012 Aronson wrote a column for School Library Journal called "Consider the Source". As of September 2014 he writes an SLJ blog called "Nonfiction Matters".

In 2001, Aronson won the first Sibert Medal for nonfiction for Sir Walter Ralegh and the Quest for El Dorado.

Aronson has a Ph.D. in American History from New York University.

Aronson is on the School of Library and Information Science faculty at Rutgers University-New Brunswick

== Personal life ==
On September 14, 1997 Aronson married Marina Budhos. They have two sons and live in Maplewood, New Jersey.

== Bibliography ==
=== Books for Middle-Grade Readers ===
- (with Scott Reynolds Nelson) Ain’t Nothing but a Man: My Quest to Find the Real John Henry, National Geographic Children's Books, 2007
- (with HP Newquist) For Boys Only: The Biggest, Baddest Book Ever, Feiwel & Friends, 2007 ISBN 9780312377069
- (with John W. Glenn) The World Made New: Why the Age of Exploration Happened and How It Changed the World National Geographic Children's Books, 2007 ISBN 9780792264545
- If Stones Could Speak: Unlocking the Secrets of Stonehenge, National Geographic Children's Books, 2010 ISBN 9781426305993
- Trapped: How the World Rescued 33 Miners from 2,000 Feet Below the Chilean Desert, Atheneum Books for Young Readers, 2011 ISBN 9781416913979
- (with Dr. Lee R. Berger) The Skull in the Rock: How a Scientist, A Boy, and Google Earth Opened a New Window Into Human Origins National Geographic Children's Books, 2012 ISBN 9781426310539
- (co-authored with Marina Budhos) Eyes of the World: Robert Capa, Gerda Taro & The Invention of Modern Photojournalism, Henry Holt (New York, NY), 2017.

=== Books for Young Adults ===
- Art Attack: A Brief Cultural History of the Avant-Garde, Clarion Books, 1998 ISBN 9780395797297
- Sir Walter Ralegh and the Quest for El Dorado, Clarion Books, 2000 ISBN 9780395848272
- John Winthrop, Oliver Cromwell, and the Land of Promise, Clarion Books, 2004 ISBN 9780618181773
- The Real Revolution: The Global Story of American Independence, Clarion Books, 2005 ISBN 9780618181797
- Witch-Hunt: Mysteries of the Salem Witch Trials, Atheneum Books for Young Readers, 2005 ISBN 9780689848643
- Race: A History Beyond Black and White, Atheneum Books for Young Readers, 2007 ISBN 9780689865541
- Robert F. Kennedy: Crusader, Viking Juvenile, 2007
- Bill Gates: Tycoon, Viking Juvenile, 2008
- Unsettled: The Problem of Loving Israel, Atheneum Books for Young Readers, 2008 ISBN 9781416912613
- Pick-Up-Game: A Full Day of Full Court (co-editor) Candlewick Press, 2011 ISBN 9780763660680
- Master of Deceit: J. Edgar Hoover and America in the Age of Lies, Candlewick Press, 2012 ISBN 9780763650254
- Rising Water: The Story of the Thai Cave Rescue (Atheneum Books for Young Readers, 2020) ISBN 9781534444140

=== Books for adults ===
- Exploding the Myths: The Truth About Teenagers and Reading, Scarecrow Press, 2001 (Studies in Young Adult Literature) ISBN 9780810839045
- Beyond the Pale: New Essays for a New Era, Scarecrow Press, 2003 ISBN 9780810846388
- Sugar Changed the World: A Story of Magic, Spice, Slavery, Freedom, and Science, with Marina Budhos, Clarion Books, 2010 ISBN 9780544582477
