= Guitar for the Practicing Musician =

Guitar magazine published in the United States

- Editor: Various
- Categories: Guitar
- Frequency: monthly
- First issue: 1983
- Final issue: 1999
- Company: Cherry Lane Music
- Country: United States
- ISSN: 0738-937X

Guitar for the Practicing Musician was a guitar magazine published in the United States by Cherry Lane Music from 1982 to 1999. The magazine was published monthly. In 1992, it was the most popular music publication at newsstands, selling 740,000 issues over a six-month period. It was popular for publishing songs with guitar (adding bass later on) in both standard notation and tablature, as well as interviews and instructional columns. Editors included HP Newquist, Rich Maloof, Pete Prown, Andy Aledort, John Stix and Bruce Pollock.

From 1993 until its shutdown, it was known simply as GUITAR Magazine.

== Issue transcriptions ==
Roundabout (11/1983); In the Dark (11/1983); I Can't Quit You Babe (11/1983); The Price You Pay (11/1983); Photograph (12/1983); Foolin' (12/1983); Gimme All Your Lovin' (12/1983); The Salt in My Tears (12/1983); Rock And Roll Hoochie Koo (12/1983); Cinnamon Girl (12/1983)	Metal Health (1/1984); Run For Cover (1/1984); White Wedding (1/1984); Lights Out (1/1984); Europa (1/1984); Freeway Jam (2/1984); She's A Woman (2/1984); Hit Me With Your Best Shot (2/1984); Green Flower Street (2/1984); Phantom of the Opera (2/1984); Tom Sawyer (3/1984); Living After Midnight (3/1984); Rock of Ages (3/1984); Breaking the Law (3/1984); After Midnight (3/1984); Paranoid (4/1984); Walk This Way (4/1984); Lick It Up (4/1984); Steppin' Out (4/1984); Your Love Is Driving Me Crazy (4/1984); Little Guitars (5/1984); Hotel California (5/1984); Cum On Feel the Noize (5/1984); Substitute (5/1984); Shakin (5/1984); Goodbye to Romance (6/1984); Don't Tell Me You Love Me (6/1984); Talking in Your Sleep (6/1984); Hold On Loosely (6/1984); I Want A New Drug (6/1984); The Spirit of Radio (7/1984); Burnin' For You (7/1984); Dust in the Wind (7/1984); Memphis, Tennessee (7/1984); Continuum (7/1984); Looks That Kill (8/1984); Flight of Icarus (8/1984); Pride And Joy (8/1984); Rebel Yell (8/1984); Crazy On You (8/1984); Rock You Like A Hurricane (9/1984); Back On the Chain Gang (9/1984); I Can See For Miles (9/1984); Blackbird (9/1984); A Whiter Shade of Pale (9/1984); Crazy Train (10/1984); Run Runaway (10/1984); Mediterranean Sundance (10/1984); Pink Houses (10/1984); Cat Scratch Fever (10/1984); Panama (11/1984); Sultans of Swing (11/1984); Owner of A Lonely Heart (11/1984); Bringin' On the Heartbreak (11/1984); Round And Round (12/1984); Rainbow in the Dark (12/1984); Hungry Heart (12/1984); Don't Stop Believin' (12/1984); Killing Floor (12/1984)	The Trooper (1/1985); Money (1/1985); Blue Sky (1/1985); The Warrior (1/1985); Rock And Roll All Night (1/1985); All Night Long (2/1985); General Lee (2/1985); Highway Star (2/1985); Midnight Maniac (2/1985); Aqualung (3/1985); Day Tripper (3/1985); Good Times, Bad Times (3/1985); Little Wing (3/1985); Sweet Little Angel (3/1985); Jump (4/1985); Captain Nemo (4/1985); Friday Night (4/1985); Bark At the Moon (4/1985); Mama Weer All Crazee Now (4/1985); Back in Black (5/1985); Hiroshima Mon Amour (5/1985); Limelight (5/1985); Rosanna (5/1985); Flying High Again (6/1985); Slick Black Cadillac (6/1985); China Cat Sunflower (6/1985); Fight the Good Fight (6/1985); Heaven's On Fire (7/1985); Rock Til You Drop (7/1985); Heartbreaker (7/1985); No One Like You (7/1985); The Last in Line (8/1985); Cocaine (8/1985); When You Close Your Eyes (8/1985); You've Got Another Thing Comin' (8/1985); Purple Haze (9/1985); Just Got Lucky (9/1985); Embryonic Journey (9/1985); Balls to the Wall (9/1985); Pride (In the Name of Love) (9/1985); Holy Diver (10/1985); Johnny B. Goode (10/1985); Dee (10/1985); Black Magic Woman (10/1985); And the Cradle Will Rock (10/1985); Aces High (11/1985); Cause We've Ended As Lovers (11/1985); Turn Up the Radio (11/1985); Mood For A Day (11/1985); You Shook Me All Night Long (12/1985); Honky Tonk Women (12/1985); Statesboro Blues (12/1985); Wanted Man (12/1985)	Couldn't Stand the Weather (1/1986); Greensleeves (1/1986); Message in A Bottle (1/1986); Mississippi Queen (1/1986); Rock And Roll Rebel (2/1986); Can't Get There From Here (2/1986); Casey Jones (2/1986); Rock And Roll (2/1986); Knocking At Your Back Door (3/1986); Black Star (3/1986); Black Mountain Side (3/1986); Michelle (3/1986); Forever Man (3/1986); Stairway to Heaven (4/1986); YYZ (4/1986); All Along the Watchtower (4/1986); Mr. Crowley (4/1986); Dream On (5/1986); Sweet Home Alabama (5/1986); Peaches En Regalia (5/1986); Detroit Rock City (5/1986); Crossroads (6/1986); Killer Queen (6/1986); Albert's Alley (6/1986); Sharp Dressed Man (6/1986); Start Me Up (7/1986); Shapes of Things (Moore) (7/1986); Alone Again (7/1986); Midsummer's Daydream (7/1986); Pinball Wizard (8/1986); Iron Man (8/1986); Jekyll And Hyde (8/1986); Day By Day (8/1986); You Really Got Me (Van Halen) (9/1986); Don't Fear the Reaper (9/1986); Little Martha (9/1986); So You Want to Be A Rock 'N' Roll Star (Petty) (9/1986); Fade to Black (10/1986); Closer to the Heart (10/1986); Room 335 (10/1986); Genesis (10/1986); Ice Cream Man (11/1986); Marching Out (11/1986); Why Worry (11/1986); Change It (11/1986); Tobacco Road (12/1986); Soul Man (12/1986); Run to the Hills (12/1986); Can't Find My Way Home (12/1986)	Stone in Love (1/1987); Twiggs Approved (1/1987); Foxy Lady (1/1987); Sunday Bloody Sunday (1/1987); Lightning Strikes (2/1987); You're in Love (2/1987); Reeling in the Years (2/1987); Samba Pa Ti (2/1987); Black Dog (3/1987); Ladies Nite in Buffalo? (3/1987); Hideaway (3/1987); I'll See the Light Tonight (3/1987); Shy Boy (4/1987); Road Games (4/1987); 5150 (4/1987); In My Dreams (4/1987); You Give Love A Bad Name (5/1987); Master of Puppets (5/1987); Blue Wind (5/1987); American Tune (5/1987); Wasted Years (6/1987); New World Man (6/1987); Quarter to Midnight (6/1987); White Room (6/1987); More Than A Feeling (7/1987); Nobody's Fool (7/1987); Keep Your Hands to Yourself (7/1987); Locked in (7/1987); I Don't Know (8/1987); Talk Dirty to Me (8/1987); Brown Sugar (8/1987); New Year's Day (8/1987); Voodoo Child (Slight Return) (9/1987); Who Made Who (9/1987); Smoking Gun (9/1987); (You Can Still) Rock in America (9/1987); Still of the Night (10/1987); Soldiers Under Command (10/1987); The End/Her Majesty (10/1987); The Clap (10/1987); Girls, Girls, Girls (11/1987); Wanted Dead Or Alive (11/1987); The Attitude Song (11/1987); Kid Charlemagne (11/1987); Whole Lotta Love (12/1987); Eruption (12/1987); Comfortably Numb (12/1987); Sugar Magnolia (12/1987)	Into the Arena (1/1988); Roxanne (1/1988); Life in the Fast Lane (1/1988); Suicide Solution (1/1988); Daydream (2/1988); Layla (2/1988); Here I Go Again (2/1988); Livin' On A Prayer (2/1988); Free Bird (3/1988); Women (3/1988); Skeletons in the Closet (3/1988); Bach's Bouree in E Minor (3/1988); Unchain the Night (4/1988); Too Rolling Stoned (4/1988); Another Nail For My Heart (4/1988); Frenzy (4/1988); Crying in the Rain (5/1988); Rock Me (5/1988); Sweet Emotion (5/1988); Long Distance Runaround (5/1988); Killer of Giants (6/1988); Little Sister (6/1988); Skyscraper (6/1988); Theme For An Imaginary Western (6/1988); Battery (7/1988); Peace of Mind (7/1988); Satch Boogie (7/1988); Wait (7/1988); Mr. Scary (8/1988); Heaven Tonight (8/1988); The Wind Cries Mary (8/1988); Over the Hills And Far Away (8/1988); Welcome to the Jungle (9/1988); Light My Fire (9/1988); Classical Gas (9/1988); Get Up (9/1988); Eight Miles High (10/1988); Queen of the Reich (10/1988); S.A.T.O. (10/1988); Another Brick in the Wall, Pt 2 (10/1988); Black And Blue (11/1988); Wake Up Dead (11/1988); Song of the Wind (11/1988); Always With Me, Always With You (11/1988); Gypsy Road (12/1988); Come On, Part One (12/1988); Damn Good (12/1988); Zap (12/1988)	Bad Medicine (1/1989); Suite Judy Blue Eyes (1/1989); Can I Play With Madness? (1/1989); While My Guitar Gently Weeps (V. Moore) (1/1989); Kiss of Death (2/1989); Pour Some Sugar On Me (2/1989); Sweet Child O' Mine (2/1989); T-Bone Shuffle (2/1989); NV43345 (2/1989); Miracle Man (3/1989); Nothing But A Good Time (3/1989); Rock 'N' Roll Hoochie Koo (3/1989); Bad Moon Rising (3/1989); Reptile (3/1989); When Love Comes to Town (4/1989); Spanish Fly (4/1989); You Know What I Mean (4/1989); Be All, End All (4/1989); Jessica (4/1989); Sunshine of Your Love (5/1989); Ain't Talkin' 'Bout Love (5/1989); Hot Dog And A Shake (5/1989); Ice Nine (5/1989); La Bamba (5/1989); One (6/1989); Confidence Man (6/1989); Here Comes the Sun (6/1989); High Wire (6/1989); The Pepper Shake (6/1989); Seventeen (7/1989); South of Heaven (7/1989); Wild Horses (7/1989); Distant Early Warning (7/1989); When the Children Cry (7/1989); Addicted to That Rush (8/1989); Every Breath you Take (8/1989); Point of Know Return (8/1989); Fire Woman (8/1989); Modern Day Cowboy (8/1989); Eyes of A Stranger (9/1989); I've Seen All Good People (9/1989); Goodbye Pork Pie Hat (9/1989); California Girls (9/1989); Behind Blue Eyes (9/1989); Rag Doll (10/1989); Wish You Were Here (10/1989); Wait Till Tomorrow (10/1989); Highway to Hell (10/1989); All That You Dream (10/1989); Jump Into the Fire (11/1989); Patience (11/1989); Scuttlebuttin' (11/1989); Cult of Personality (11/1989); End of the Line (11/1989); The Forgotten Part 2 (12/1989); Mista Bone (12/1989); China Grove (12/1989); The Ocean (12/1989); Practice What You Preach (12/1989)
Dr. Feelgood (1/1990); Yesterday (1/1990); Man For All Season (1/1990); Deuce (1/1990); Mutha (Don't Wanna Go to School Today) (1/1990); Kitten's Got Claws (2/1990); La Grange (2/1990); Love Song (2/1990); Lola (2/1990); School's Out (2/1990); Big Bad Moon (3/1990); I Don't Believe in Love (3/1990); The Shortest Straw (3/1990); Close My Eyes Forever (3/1990); Rock And A Hard Place (3/1990); Headed For A Heartbreak (4/1990); 18 And Life (4/1990); Over My Head (4/1990); Suffragette City (4/1990); Truckin' (4/1990); People Get Ready (5/1990); Sittin' On Top of the World (5/1990); Mr. Scary (5/1990); Janie's Got A Gun (5/1990); Presto (6/1990); 32 Pennies (6/1990); Abigail (6/1990); Anesthesia: Pulling Teeth (6/1990); Hey Joe (6/1990); Call It Sleep (7/1990); My Old School (7/1990); Gutter Ballet (7/1990); Bigmouth Strikes Again (7/1990); Forever (7/1990); Icarus Dream Suite (7/1990); Steal Away (8/1990); Up All Night (8/1990); Long Time (8/1990); Mystical Potato Head Groove Thing (8/1990); Black Velvet (8/1990); I Wish It Would Rain Down (9/1990); Toy Soldiers (9/1990); Hot For Teacher (9/1990); Hands All Over (9/1990); House of Pain (9/1990); Blaze of Glory (10/1990); Epic (10/1990); Go Your Own Way (10/1990); I Think I Love You Too Much (10/1990); Life Goes On (10/1990); I Would Love To (11/1990); Miles Away (11/1990); Got the Time (11/1990); What Is And What Should Never Be (11/1990); Running Down A Dream (11/1990); Lovin' You's A Dirty Job (12/1990); Crossfire (12/1990); Decadence Dance (12/1990); Civil War (12/1990); Smoke On the Water (12/1990)	Type (1/1991); Jealous Again (1/1991); Stop (1/1991); Bluebird (1/1991); Cliffs of Dover (1/1991); Falling to Pieces (2/1991); Higher Ground (2/1991); Air (2/1991); Love in An Elevator (2/1991); Terminal Beach (2/1991); The Best I Can (3/1991); Hell's Bells (3/1991); Fly to the Angels (3/1991); Joey (3/1991); The Boys Are Back in Town (3/1991); The Star Spangled Banner (4/1991); Highland Wedding (4/1991); My Head's in Mississippi (4/1991); Lucretia (4/1991); A Lil' Ain't Enough (4/1991); Mary Had A Little Lamb (5/1991); Free Will (5/1991); Dream Warriors (5/1991); Crosseyed Mary (5/1991); Walk This Way (5/1991); Bron Yr Aur (6/1991); She Talks to Angels (6/1991); Coming of Age (6/1991); War Ensemble (6/1991); Love Me Two Times (6/1991); Mean Street (7/1991); Seek And Destroy (7/1991); Bohemian Rhapsody (7/1991); Caprice No. 24 (7/1991); Turn! Turn! Turn! (7/1991); Poundcake (8/1991); All the Way to Memphis (8/1991); The Needle And the Damage Done (8/1991); Incident At Neshabur (8/1991); Silent Lucidity (8/1991); Get the Funk Out (9/1991); Monkey Business (9/1991); Question (9/1991); Anarchy in the UK (9/1991); Daddy, Brother, Lover, Little Boy (9/1991); The Threat (10/1991); You Could Be Mine (10/1991); Bad to the Bone (10/1991); Green River (10/1991); Jesu, Joy of Man's Desiring (10/1991); Runaround (11/1991); Twice As Hard (11/1991); Enter Sandman (11/1991); I Wanna Be Sedated (11/1991); Trademark (11/1991); Don't Tread On Me (12/1991); Go to Hell (12/1991); La Villa Strangiato (12/1991); Summerland (12/1991); Helplessly Hoping (12/1991)	Through the Never (1/1992); Shout At the Devil (1/1992); From the Beginning (1/1992); I Want You Back (1/1992); Don't Cry (1/1992); Hangar 18 (2/1992); Righteous (2/1992); Badge (2/1992); Flight of the Wounded Bumble Bee (2/1992); We Die Young (2/1992); Runnin' With the Devil (3/1992); Castles Made of Sand (3/1992); Whole Lotta Rosie (3/1992); The Sky Is Crying (3/1992); The Weight (3/1992); Communication Breakdown (4/1992); In My Life (4/1992); Outshined (4/1992); Remember When (4/1992); The Garden (4/1992); Alive \& Kickin' (5/1992); One Way Out (5/1992); Give It Away (5/1992); Break On Through (5/1992); Photograph (5/1992); Shapes of Things (6/1992); Rusty Cage (6/1992); No More Tears (6/1992); Deja Vu (6/1992); Tush (6/1992); Corrosion of Conformity (6/1992); Madman (7/1992); I Still Haven't Found What I'm Looking For (7/1992); Tie Your Mother Down (7/1992); Mouth For War (7/1992); Crazy Train (7/1992); Summer Song (8/1992); Where Were You (8/1992); Machine Gun (8/1992); 316 (8/1992); Back Door Romeo (8/1992); A Small Victory (9/1992); Wherever I May Roam (9/1992); Real Love (9/1992); Proud Mary (9/1992); State of Love and Trust (10/1992); November Rain (10/1992); Funk \#49 (10/1992); Point Counterpoint (10/1992); Institutionalized (10/1992); Would? (11/1992); Stairway to Heaven (11/1992); While My Guitar Gently Weeps (11/1992); Hunger Strike (11/1992); Foreclosure of a Dream (11/1992); Rest in Peace (12/1992); Jesus Christ Pose (12/1992); Dirty Black Summer (12/1992); Jeremy (12/1992); Spanish Castle Magic (12/1992)	Sad But True (1/1993); Unsung (1/1993); The One I Love (1/1993); Maggie May (1/1993); Stardog Champion (1/1993); Yesterdays (2/1993); Walk (2/1993); The Extremist (2/1993); We Are the Champions (2/1993); Before You Accuse Me (2/1993); Sweating Bullets (3/1993); Love Struck Baby (3/1993); Once (3/1993); Rockin' in the Free World (3/1993); Somebody to Shove (3/1993); Tragic Comic (4/1993); Right Now (4/1993); Hey You (4/1993); Supernaut (4/1993); Brass in Pocket (4/1993); Mama Kin (5/1993); Son of a Gun (5/1993); Them Bones (5/1993); Dead Skin Mask (5/1993); Strawberry Fields Forever (5/1993); Man on the Moon (6/1993); Cat's in the Cradle (6/1993); Tumblin' Dice (6/1993); Best of Both Worlds (Live) (6/1993); Until You Suffer Some (Fire \& Ice) (6/1993); Two Princes (7/1993); Space Oddity (7/1993); Going Down (7/1993); Heaven \& Hell (7/1993); Over the Mountain (7/1993); Eat the Rich (8/1993); Runaway Train (8/1993); I Don't Believe in Love (8/1993); Plush (8/1993); Cold Gin (8/1993); 316 (Live) (9/1993); Are You Gonna Go My Way (9/1993); Star Trek Theme (9/1993); Bomb Track (9/1993); All Right Now (9/1993); Deep Down Into the Pain (10/1993); Poison My Eyes (10/1993); Bodhisattva (10/1993); Who Was in My Room Last Night? (10/1993); Modoc (10/1993); Colorado Bulldog (11/1993); Her Black Wings (11/1993); Surfing With the Alien (11/1993); Alex Chilton (11/1993); Since I've Been Loving You (11/1993); Cryin' (12/1993); Laughing Gas (12/1993); Thunder Kiss '65 (12/1993); I Saw the Light (12/1993); Ode to Joy (12/1993)	Today (1/1994); Blue Powder \& Amazing Grace (1/1994); Sister Havana (1/1994); Under the Gun (1/1994); Jingo (1/1994); Refuse/Resist (2/1994); Sober (2/1994); Cold Fire (2/1994); Dirty Love (2/1994); Dixie Chicken (2/1994); Take the Time (3/1994); Rape Me (3/1994); Welcome Home (Sanitarium) (3/1994); The Thill Is Gone (3/1994); Baroque ?(3/1994)		

== See also ==
- Guitar Player magazine
- List of defunct American magazines
