= Ask Me No Questions (novel) =

2006 novel by Marina Budhos

- First edition
- Author: Marina Budhos
- Language: English
- Genre: Historical fiction
- Publisher: Atheneum Books
- Publication date: 2006
- Publication place: United States
- Media type: Print (paperback)
- Pages: 162
- ISBN: 978-1-4169-0351-2
- OCLC: 57613403

Ask Me No Questions is a novel by Marina Budhos, published by Scholastic in 2007. It covers the trials and turmoil a family of Bangladeshi immigrants face after the September 11th attacks.

Marina Budhos is an author for early learning and women's struggles.

== Characters ==
- Aisha: She wants to be a doctor. She also believes that everybody should be treated equally. When problems arise in her life usually Aisha has the answers, until the problem comes down to her family. A total control freak. She copies the other Americans to be able to fit in.
- Nadira: She is a child who wants to stay a child. In the beginning of the story, she believes that she is not smart enough to go to college, but once she solves the family problem, she believes she can accomplish any and everything.
- Abba: He is Nadira and Aisha's father. He gets sent to a detention center because his family is illegal. He is a kind and smart man.
- Ma: She is the root of the family. She is quiet. She does not say much because she does not like trouble. She also wants her kids to keep their old life because she does not like new things. When she finally understands that her kids need to be active and not closed in, she lets go of being afraid of the world outside.
- Lily: Nadira's best friend. She is an immigrant. She does not understand Nadira when she talks about her problems at home. Her mother and father are divorced.
- Naseem: He is Abba’s deceased brother.
- Taslima: She is Nadira and Aisha’s cousin, and she is a bad influence on them. But at the same time she has her own imagination and her own goals and plans for her future.
- Uncle: He is Taslima’s father, and he loves his nieces, and he wants to help their family out. But he also is worried about his own family and is determining whether he should move the family back to Bangladesh.
- Auntie: She is Taslima’s mother and she wants to be the girls' mother until their mother comes home from the shelter.
- Risa, Rose, and Kavita: Aisha’s best friends.
- Tareq: He is one of the guys that all the girls admire except Nadira and Aisha. Also Is acquainted with Nadira.

== Awards ==
- Junior Library Guild Award
- YALSA Best Book for Young Adults
- ALA Best Books For Young Adults
- ALA Notable Children's Books
- Bank Street Best Books of the Year
