= Cherry Lane Music =

American music publishing company

- Founded: 1960
- Founder: Milton Okun
- Successor: BMG Rights Management
- Country of origin: United States
- Headquarters location: New York City
- Publication types: sheet music, books

Cherry Lane Music was an American music publisher based in New York City. It was founded in 1960 by Milton Okun in the apartment above the Cherry Lane Theater in Greenwich Village, Manhattan. Cherry Lane Music developed a wide range of high quality sheet music, DVDs, and educational tools for musicians. In March 2010, Cherry Lane was acquired by BMG Rights Management, which had been formed in 2008 jointly by Bertelsmann AG and Kohlberg Kravis Roberts & Co. BMG operated Cherry Lane as a subsidiary and is currently an in-name-only unit of BMG Rights Management.

== History ==
The print company's portfolio included sheet music of performing artists from a wide variety of genres, including Linda Ronstadt, Kenny Rogers, Barbra Streisand, Richard Marx, Bonnie Raitt, Billy Idol, Pat Benatar, Maury Yeston, Billy Squier, John Denver, The Black Eyed Peas, Quincy Jones, John Legend, Elvis Presley, the soundtrack to the Pokémon franchise, the White Stripes, the Dave Matthews Band, Metallica, and Jack Johnson.

When BMG acquired Cherry Lane in 2010, the number of copyrighted musical works was approximately 150,000. The estimated acquisition price ranged between 85 and 100 million US dollars.

Cherry Lane Music distributed products through Hal Leonard, another US-based music publisher. As of 2019, BMG no longer lists Cherry Lane as a subsidiary or a company brand. Its website was merged into BMG's "new music company" website.

== Selected types of folios ==
Cherry Lane provided a number of different kinds of personality folios aimed at musicians of all skill levels.

	Cherry Lane folios and series
The Art of	is a series that provides an overview of the style of important contemporary guitarists, from Kirk Hammett and James Hetfield of Metallica to Steely Dan. The books are written with an educational focus, and include various licks, solos, lessons, interviews, and commentary to help the student understand a particular artist's work and the influence it has had. Topics are related to theory, and include discussions of melody, harmony, form, rhythm, instrumentation, and lyrics. There is a resource guide, for further reading, listening, and research included in the back of most of these books.
Just the Riffs	is a series of books that focus on single artists and provide classic riffs in artists' repertoire. As stated in the Cherry Lane Music 2010–2011 Catalog, " ... here it is, here's how it sounds, and here's how to play it." The books include a brief theoretical background before each riff to give the musician more guidance in its performance.
Legendary Licks	is a series that combines the ease and straightforward nature of the Just the Riffs series with the educational power of the Riff by Riff and The Art of series. The books contain note-for-note transcriptions, as well as performance notes, of dozens of classic licks, fills, riffs, and solos of artists with as diverse a range as Metallica and Ozzy Osbourne to Dave Matthews Band and Brian Setzer. Each Legendary Licks folio contains a recording that features slowed-down versions of challenging solos and riffs to help musicians get the notes into their fingers. The recordings also are on separate channels, making it possible to listen to all of the instruments at once or to single out instruments with which the student can play along.
Play it Like it Is and Artist-Approved	provides precise, authentic transcriptions of various artists' folios for guitar, bass, and drums. Guitar and bass books include both notes and tablature. Those books that feature the "Artist-Approved" logo have been personally approved by the transcribed artist.
Riff by Riff	is a series that provides an in-depth look at a number of tunes by a specific artist. Rather than picking a mix of riffs, as the Just the Riffs series does, it takes the entire song apart, using almost every guitar part played in a note-for-note transcription. The book examines the theoretical, rhythmic, and harmonic implications of each riff as it ties the song together. The series aims to give all musicians, no matter the skill level, a complete, in-depth, and thorough analysis of the work of an artist. Artists represented include Metallica and Black Sabbath.
Strum & Sing	is a series that gives the musician a more pared-down approach to the songs of an artist, including only the chords and the lyrics. The quick, easy-to-play arrangements are designed for both amateur and professional musicians.
Transcribed Full Scores	provides vocal and instrumental arrangements of music from artists such as Guns N' Roses, Metallica, and Joe Satriani. There are transcribed parts for vocals, all guitars, bass, drums, and any other instruments used in the specific recording session as heard on the original album.
Joy of Singing	is a collection of popular songs arranged for chorus.
