= Whirinaki Whare Taonga =

Art Centre in Upper Hutt, New Zealand

Whirinaki Whare Taonga is an art centre in Upper Hutt, New Zealand. The Centre consists of five public art galleries, a 200-seat theatre, a creative classroom, and a recreation hall. Whirinaki opened in 2003 and was at that time called Expressions Arts and Entertainment Centre. It later changed its name to Whirinaki in 2021. The Māori word Whirinaki means to lean, rely on, or provide support. Whare Taonga means "house of treasure". The purpose of Whirinaki Whare Taonga is to build social cohesion and improve wellbeing through arts, culture, and events. An average of 150,000 people visit each year.

Whirinaki hosts exhibitions ranging from New Zealand and international art to local artists, with an emphasis on interactive, family-friendly shows. Longer-term exhibitions explore the cultural and social history of Upper Hutt. Notable international exhibitions hosted by the Centre include 50 Greatest Photographs of National Geographic (Smithsonian, 2015), Catwalk to Cover (London Fashion Museum, 2016), and The Secrets of Mona Lisa (The Louvre, 2017). In 2024 Whirinaki presented Hall of Heroes, which drew record attendance.

Whirinaki hosts concerts, theatre, dance, and community events. Major annual events include the King's Birthday Music Festival, and the Classical Expressions chamber music series. The recreation hall hosts community events such as the Upper Hutt Multicultural Festival and the Heretaunga Bookfest.

Whirinaki Whare Taonga is owned by Upper Hutt City Council and operated by the Whirinaki Whare Taonga Trust, a charitable Council Controlled Organisation. Trustees are volunteers and are unpaid. The Trust participates in Council's Long Term Plan consultations, and reports through annual statements and strategic documents.

Whirinaki holds a small collection of early New Zealand Impressionism artworks. The collection was gifted by Ernest and Shirley Cosgrove in 2009. The collection centres on artist James Nairn, who lived at Pumpkin Cottage, a hub for early New Zealand Impressionists. History The Upper Hutt Civic Centre opened in 1969, followed by the Civic Hall in 1971. In 1993 the Upper Hutt Valley Community Arts Council proposed a local arts theatre, leading to the establishment of the Upper Hutt Community Arts Centre Trust in 1994. Architecture+ was engaged to design the facility. Construction of the new Expressions building began in 2002 and was completed in 2003. Extension (2015–2021) To accommodate growing visitor numbers, Whirinaki underwent a major expansion, adding the Gillies Gallery, collection storage, a creative workshop, and a commercial kitchen, funded in part by the Regional Amenities Fund. The extension, designed by Athfield Architects and built by Maycroft Construction, opened in 2021.
