= National Science Teaching Association =

Non-profit organisation in the USA

- Abbreviation: NSTA
- Formation: 1944
- Headquarters: Arlington, Virginia, U.S.
- Members: 40,000
- Website: www.nsta.org

The National Science Teaching Association (NSTA), founded in 1944 (as the National Science Teachers Association) and headquartered in Arlington, Virginia, is an association of science teachers in the United States and is the largest organization of science teachers worldwide. NSTA's current membership of roughly 40,000 includes science teachers, science supervisors, administrators, scientists, business and industry representatives, and others involved in and committed to science education.

The Association publishes a professional journal for each level of science teaching; a newspaper, NSTA Reports; and many other educational books and professional publications. Each year NSTA conducts a national conference and a series of area conferences. These events attract over 30,000 attendees annually. The Association serves as an advocate for science educators by keeping its members and the general public informed about national issues and trends in science education.

== History ==
NSTA was formed by the merger of two existing non-professional organizations, the American Science Teachers Association and the American Council of Science Teachers, at a July 1944 meeting in Pittsburgh, Pennsylvania. The organization was initially headquartered at Cornell University. This first permanent headquarters, purchased in 1972, was located on Connecticut Avenue in Washington, D.C., and then moved to Arlington, Virginia in 1994.

== Position statements ==
NSTA is engaged in an ongoing effort to "identify the qualities and standards of good science education," publishing its findings in the form of position statements. These position statements are developed by science educators, scientists, and other national experts in science education, and the input of NSTA's membership is solicited before final approval by the board of directors. Over 35 topics are covered, including The Nature of Science, Safety and Science Instruction, The Teaching of Evolution, Environmental education, Responsible Use of Live Animals and Dissection in the Science Classroom, Gender Equity in Science Education, and Use of the Metric System.

In 2018, the NSTA urged teachers to "emphasize to students that no scientific controversy exists regarding the basic facts of climate change."

== Science Matters ==
Science Matters is a major public awareness and engagement campaign designed to rekindle a national sense of urgency and action among schools and families about the importance of science education and science literacy. Science Matters builds on the success of the Building a Presence for Science program, first launched in 1997 as an e-networking initiative to assist teachers of science with professional development opportunities. The Building a Presence for Science network—now the Science Matters network—reaches readers in 34 states and the District of Columbia.

== Publications ==
Peer-reviewed journals:

- Science and Children, elementary level, established in 1963
- Science Scope, middle level, established in 1983
- The Science Teacher, high school, established in 1950
- Journal of College Science Teaching
- NSTA Recommends – review recommendations of science-teaching materials
- Connected Science Learning', linking in-school and out-of-school STEM learning

Books:

NSTA's publishing arm, NSTA Press, publishes 20–25 new titles per year. The NSTA Science Store offers selected publications from other publishers in addition to NSTA Press books.

== NSTA student chapters ==
In addition to state/province chapters and associated groups, NSTA has over 100 student chapters. NSTA and the student chapters are separate but interdependent organizations that have elected to ally themselves to encourage professional development and networking of preservice teachers of science from across the United States and Canada.

== NSTA affiliates ==
As of 2018, NSTA has the following affiliates:

- Association for Multicultural Science Education (AMSE)
- Association for Science Teacher Education (ASTE)
- Association of Science-Technology Centers (ASTC)
- Council for Elementary Science International (CESI)
- Council of State Science Supervisors (CSSS)
- National Association of Science Teaching (NARST): A Worldwide Organization for Improving Science Teaching and Learning Through Research
- National Middle Level Science Teachers Association (NMLSTA)
- National Science Education Leadership Association (NSELA)
- Society for College Science Teachers (SCST)

== Outstanding Science Trade Books Award ==
This award is a joint project of NSTA and the Children’s Book Council. It has been awarded since 1973.

=== 2022 ===
- The Beak Book, by Robin Page
- Beavers: Radical Rodents and Ecosystem Engineers, by Frances Backhouse
- The Body Book, illustrated by Hannah Alice
- Curious About Fish, by Cathryn Sill, illustrated by John Sill
- The Dirt Book: Poems About Animals That Live Beneath Our Feet, by David L. Harrison, illustrated by Kate Cosgrove
- Disasters by the Numbers: A Book of Infographics, by Steve Jenkins
- Dr. Fauci: How a Boy from Brooklyn Became America's Doctor, by Kate Messner, illustrated by Alexandra Bye
- Evelyn Hooker and the Fairy Project, by Gayle E. Pitman, illustrated by Sarah Green
- Fearless World Traveler: Adventures of Marianne North, Botanical Artist, by Laurie Lawlor, illustrated by Becca Stadtlander
- Fossils from Lost Worlds, by Damien Laverdunt, Hélène Rajcak
- Fred & Marjorie: A Doctor, a Dog, and the Discovery of Insulin, by Deborah Kerbel, illustrated by Angela Poon
- Fungarium: Welcome to the Museum, by Ester Gaya, illustrated by Katie Scott
- Hello, Earth!: Poems to Our Planet, by Joyce Sidman, illustrated by Miren Asiain Lora
- History Smashers: Plagues and Pandemics, by Kate Messner, illustrated by Falynn Koch
- If Bees Disappeared, by Lily Williams
- Inside In: X-Rays of Nature's Hidden World, by Jan Paul Schutten, illustrated by Arie van 't Riet
- A Life Electric: The Story of Nikola Tesla, by Azadeh Westergaard, illustrated by Júlia Sardà
- Masters of Disguise: Camouflaging Creatures & Magnificent Mimics, by Marc Martin
- Ocean Planet: Animals of the Sea and Shore, by Ben Rothery
- Over and Under the Canyon, by Kate Messner, illustrated by Christopher Silas Neal
- Pooper Snooper, by Jennifer Keats Curtis and Julianne Ubigau, illustrated by Phyllis Saroff
- Saving Sorya: Chang Sun Bear, by Trang Nguyen, illustrated by Jeet Zdung
- Scientists: Inspiring Tales of the World's Brightest Scientific Minds, by Isabel Thomas, illustrated by Jessamy Hawke
- The Secret Life of the Sloth, by Laurence Pringle, illustrated by Kate Garchinsky
- She Persisted: Virginia Apgar, by Sayantani DasGupta and Chelsea Clinton, illustrated by Alexandra Boiger and Gillian Flint
- Summertime Sleepers: Animals That Estivate, by Melissa Stewart, illustrated by Sarah Brannen
- Tracking Tortoises: The Mission to Save a Galápagos Giant, by Kate Messner
- Wonder Women of Science: Twelve Geniuses Who Are Currently Rocking Science, Technology, and the World, by Tiera Fletcher and Ginger Rue, illustrated by Sally Wern Comport

=== 2021 ===
- Animal Homes, by Mary Holland
- Atomic Women: The Untold Stories of the Scientists Who Helped Create the Nuclear Bomb, by Roseanne Montillo
- Audubon Birding Adventures for Kids: Activities and Ideas for Watching, Feeding, and Housing Our Feathered Friends, by Elissa Wolfson and Margaret Barker
- The Big Bang Book, by Asa Stahl, illustrated by Carly Allen-Fletcher
- The Big One: The Cascadia Earthquakes and the Science of Saving Lives, by Elizabeth Rusch
- Blood and Germs: The Civil War Battle Against Wounds and Disease, by Gail Jarrow
- Bones: An Inside Look at the Animal Kingdom, by Jules Howard, illustrated by Chervelle Fryer
- Born Curious: 20 Girls Who Grew Up to Be Awesome Scientists, by Martha Freeman, illustrated by Katy Wu
- Bright Dreams: The Brilliant Inventions of Nikola Tesla, by Tracy Dockray
- Changing the Equation: 50+ US Black Women in STEM, by Tonya Bolden
- Condor Comeback, by Sy Montgomery, photographed by Tianne Strombeck
- Darwin's Rival: Alfred Russel Wallace and the Search for Evolution, by Christiane Dorion, illustrated by Harry Tennant
- Dinosaur Lady: The Daring Discoveries of Mary Anning, the First Paleontologist, by Linda Skeers, illustrated by Marta Álvarez Miguéns
- Exploring the Elements: A Complete Guide to the Periodic Table, by Isabel Thomas, illustrated by Sara Gillingham
- Grow: Secrets of Our DNA, by Nicola Davies, illustrated by Emily Sutton
- If You Take Away the Otter, by Susannah Buhrman-Deever, illustrated by Matthew Trueman
- Journey Under the Arctic , by Fabien Cousteau and James O. Fraioli, illustrated by Joe St. Pierre
- Jumbo: The Making of the Boeing 747, by Chris Gall, illustrated by Chris Gall
- The Kitchen Pantry Scientist: Chemistry for Kids: Homemade Science Experiments and Activities Inspired by Awesome Chemists, Past and Present, by Liz Lee Heinecke
- Marjory Saves the Everglades: The Story of Marjory Stoneman Douglas, by Sandra Neil Wallace, illustrated by Rebecca Gibbon
- Nesting, by Henry Cole, illustrated by Henry Cole
- North Pole / South Pole: From Pole to Pole: A Flip Book, by Michael Bright, illustrated by Nic Jones
- Old Enough to Save the Planet, by Loll Kirby, illustrated by Adelina Lirius
- Packs: Strength in Numbers, by Hannah Salyer
- Pika Country: Climate Change at the Top of the World, by Dorothy Hinshaw Patent and Marlo Garnsworthy, photographed by Dan Hartman
- Plasticus Maritimus: An Invasive Species, by Ana Pêgo and Isabel Minhós Martins, illustrated by Bernardo P. Carvalho
- The Polio Pioneer, by Linda Elovitz Marshall, illustrated by Lisa Anchin
- Pretty Tricky: The Sneaky Ways Plants Survive, by Etta Kaner, illustrated by Ashley Barron
- Return from Extinction: The Triumph of the Elephant Seal, by Linda L. Richards
- Sea Otters: A Survival Story, by Isabelle Groc
- To Fly Among the Stars: The Hidden Story of the Fight for Women Astronauts, by Rebecca Siegel
- What Do Scientists Do All Day?, by Jane Wilsher, illustrated by Maggie Li
- What Do You Do If You Work at the Zoo?, by Steve Jenkins and Robin Page, illustrated by Steve Jenkins
- Wildlife Ranger Action Guide: Track, Spot & Provide Healthy Habitat for Creatures Close to Home, by Mary Kay Carson

== Best STEM Books Award ==
Best STEM Books is a joint project of NSTA and CBC since 2017 that represents the year’s best children’s books with STEM content.

=== 2023 ===
- Action!: How Movies Began, by Meghan McCarthy
- The Amazing World of Video Game Development, by Denis Galanin
- American Murderer: The Parasite That Haunted the South, by Gail Jarrow
- Bear Builds a House, by Maxwell Eaton III
- Blast Off!: How Mary Sherman Morgan Fueled America Into Space, by Suzanne Slade, illustrated by Sally Wern Comport
- Blips on a Screen: How Ralph Baer Invented TV Video Gaming and Launched a Worldwide Obsession, by Kate Hannigan, illustrated by Zachariah Ohora
- Break Down: Explosions, Implosions, Crashes, Crunches, Cracks, and More...A How Things Work Look at How Things Don't, by Mara Grunbaum
- Concrete: From the Ground Up, by Larissa Theule, illustrated by Steve Light
- Edward Lorenz and the Chaotic Butterflies, by Robert Black, illustrated by Christopher Tice (cover)
- How Science Saved the Eiffel Tower, by Emma Bland Smith, illustrated by Lia Visirin
- How to Hear the Universe: Gaby González and the Search for Einstein's Ripples in Space-Time, by Patricia Valdez, illustrated by Sara Palacios
- Imhotep of Ancient Kemet, by Ekiuwa Aire, illustrated by Anastasia Kyrpenko and Simbarashe Langton Vera
- In Our Garden, by Pat Zietlow Miller, illustrated by Melissa Crowton
- Lion Lights: My Invention That Made Peace with Lions, by Richard Turere and Shelly Pollock, illustrated by Sonia Possentini
- The Mystery of the Monarchs: How Kids, Teachers, and Butterfly Fans Helped Fred and Norah Urquhart Track the Great Monarch Migration, by Barb Rosenstock, illustrated by Erika Meza
- No Boundaries: 25 Women Explorers and Scientists Share Adventures, Inspiration, and Advice, by Gabby Salazar and Clare Fieseler
- Penny, the Engineering Tail of the Fourth Little Pig, by Kimberly Derting and Shelli R. Johannes, illustrated by Hannah Marks
- Science Comics: Bridges: Engineering Masterpieces, by Dan Zettwoch
- Show and Tell! Great Graphs and Smart Charts: An Introduction to Infographics, by Stuart J. Murphy, illustrated by Teresa Bellón
- Sleuth & Solve: Science: 20+ Mind-Twisting Mysteries, by Ana Gallo, illustrated by Victor Escandell
- Something Great, by Jeanette Bradley
- Superpower?: The Wearable-Tech Revolution, by Elaine Kachala, illustrated by Belle Wuthrich
- What Is Math?, by Rebecca Kai Dotlich, illustrated by Sachiko Yoshikawa
- Zhang Heng and the Incredible Earthquake Detector, by Randel McGee

=== 2022 ===
- Amara and the Bats, by Emma Reynolds
- Artificial Intelligence, by Dinah Williams
- Benoit Mandelbrot: Reshaping the World, by Robert Black
- Bicycle: Eureka! The Biography of an Idea, by Lori Haskins Houran, illustrated by Aaron Cushley
- A Shot in the Arm: Big Ideas that Changed the World #3, by Don Brown
- Bones Unearthed, by Kerrie Logan Hollihan
- Building Zaha: The Story of Architect Zaha Hadid, by Victoria Tentler-Krylov
- Classified: The Secret Career of Mary Golda Ross, Cherokee Aerospace Engineer, by Traci Sorell, illustrated by Natasha Donovan
- Code Breaker, Spy Hunter: How Elizebeth Friedman Changed the Course of Two World Wars, by Laurie Wallmark, illustrated by Brooke Smart
- Cougar Crossing: How Hollywood's Celebrity Cougar Helped Build a Bridge for City Wildlife, by Meeg Pincus, illustrated by Alexander Vidal
- Eat Bugs! #1: Project Startup, by Heather Alexander
- Einstein: The Fantastic Journey of a Mouse Through Space and Time, by Torben Kuhlmann
- From Here to There: Inventions That Changed the Way the World Moves, by Vivian Kirkfield, illustrated by Gilbert Ford
- Glasses: Eureka! The Biography of an Idea, by
- The Great Stink: How Joseph Bazalgette Solved London’s Poop Pollution Problem, by Colleen Paeff, illustrated by Nancy Carpenter
- Lady Bird Johnson, That's Who!: The Story of a Cleaner and Greener America, by Tracy Nelson Maurer, illustrated by Ginnie Hsu
- The Leaf Detective: How Margaret Lowman Uncovered Secrets in the Rainforest, by Heather Lang, illustrated by Jana Christy
- A Life Electric: The Story of Nikola Tesla, by Azadeh Westergaard, illustrated by Júlia Sardà
- Light Bulb: Eureka! The Biography of an Idea, by Kathleen Weidner Zoehfeld, illustrated by Stephanie Dehennin
- Look, Grandma! Ni, Elisi!, by Art Coulson, illustrated by Madelyn Goodnight
- Luna's Yum Yum Dim Sum, by Natasha Yim, illustrated by Violet Kim
- Maxine Greatest Garden Ever, by Ruth Spiro, illustrated by Holly Hatam
- Mimic Makers: Biomimicry Inventors Inspired by Nature, by Kristen Nordstrom, illustrated by Paul Boston
- Molly and the Mathematical Mysteries: Ten Interactive Adventures in Mathematical Wonderland, by Eugenia Cheng, illustrated by Aleksandra Artymowska
- Race to the Bottom of the Earth: Surviving Antarctica, by Rebecca E. F. Barone
- Scene of The Crime: Tracking Down Criminals with Forensic Science, by HP Newquist
- Secrets of the Sea: The Story of Jeanne Power, Revolutionary Marine Scientist, by Evan Griffith, illustrated by Joannie Stone
- Someone Builds the Dream, by Lisa Wheeler, illustrated by Loren Long
- The Stuff Between the Stars: How Vera Rubin Discovered Most of the Universe, by Sandra Nickel, illustrated by Aimée Sicuro
- Thank You, Dr. Salk!: The Scientist Who Beat Polio and Healed the World, by Dean Robbins, illustrated by Mike Dutton
- Uma Wimple Charts Her House, by Reif Larsen, illustrated by Ben Gibson
- Upstream, Downstream: Exploring Watershed Connections, by Rowena Rae
- What Is Nintendo?, by Gina Shaw
- Wonder Women of Science: Twelve Geniuses Who Are Currently Rocking Science, Technology, and the World, by Tiera Fletcher and Ginger Rue, illustrated by Sally Wern Comport

== See also ==
- Virginia Association of Science Teachers
- Children’s Book Council
