= History Smashers =

Book series by Kate Messner

- First edition paperback of the series' debut The Mayflower
- Author: Kate Messner; Gwendolyn Hooks; José Barreiro
- Illustrator: Dylan Meconis; Justin Greenwood; Falynn Koch; Damon Smyth
- Country: United States
- Language: English
- Genre: Children's non-fiction; middle grade
- Publisher: Random House
- Published: 2020–present
- No. of books: 11

History Smashers is a middle grade non-fiction book series by American author Kate Messner. The series debunks misconceptions about historical events and aims to tell a more accurate version of history. The books incorporate text, illustrations, and photographs.

The series is published by Random House. The first two titles, The Mayflower and Women's Right to Vote, were published simultaneously in 2020. The series has received positive reviews from critics. The next book in the series, The Space Race, is set to release in July 2026.

== Background ==
Messner has stated her goal with the series is "to tell stories in a way that’s respectful of kids." She followed this up by stating "Kids can handle more than we think they can. And I feel like being honest with kids is really important. Sometimes our teaching of history has not fared so well in that area, particularly when it comes to our failings as a country, our mistakes. We like to teach little kids nice stories about history. I think we can start to have those conversations earlier."

== Layout ==
The books feature text, illustrations, photographs, sidebars, and comic book–style panels. It also features extracts from historical texts, which it translates into simple contemporary English. The books ends with an author's note, a list of recommended reading, a bibliography, image credits, and an index. Some of the books also feature a timeline at the end.

== Publication history ==
All of the entries were written by Kate Messner, with The Underground Railroad and Christopher Columbus and the Taino People being co-written by Gwendolyn Hooks and José Barreiro respectively. All entries in the series were published by Random House. The series' first two entries, The Mayflower and Women's Right to Vote, were published simultaneously on July 7, 2020. It currently has eleven entries, with the twelfth set to release on July 21, 2026.

No.	Title	Date	Subject	Illustrator	Co-author	ISBN
1	The Mayflower	July 7, 2020	Mayflower	Dylan Meconis	—	978-0593120316
2	Women’s Right to Vote	July 7, 2020	Women's suffrage in the United States	Dylan Meconis	—	978-0593120347
3	Pearl Harbor	November 10, 2020	Attack on Pearl Harbor	Dylan Meconis	—	978-0593120385
4	The Titanic	February 2, 2021	Titanic	Dylan Meconis	—	978-0593120446
5	The American Revolution	July 20, 2021	American Revolutionary War	Justin Greenwood	—	978-0593120460
6	Plagues and Pandemics	October 5, 2021	Pandemics	Falynn Koch	—	978-0593120408
7	The Underground Railroad	May 17, 2022	Underground Railroad	Damon Smyth	Gwendolyn Hooks	978-0593428931
8	Christopher Columbus and the Taino People	August 8, 2023	Christopher Columbus and the Taíno	Falynn Koch	José Barreiro	978-0593564264
9	Salem Witch Trials	August 13, 2024	Salem witch trials	Falynn Koch	—	978-0593705278
10	Earth Day and the Environment	March 11, 2025	Environmentalism	Justin Greenwood	—	978-0593705308
11	Ancient Egypt	October 7, 2025	Ancient Egypt	Falynn Koch	—	978-0593902332
12	The Space Race	July 21, 2026	Space Race	Falynn Koch	—	978-0593902363

== Reception ==
The book series has received positive reviews from critics. Critics often praised its accuracy, its accessibility, its illustrations, its humorous tone, and its comprehensiveness.

Kirkus Reviews praised The Mayflower for not underestimating the capacity of its readers and for refusing to cast the Wampanoag as other. Kim Gardner of School Library Journal praised its accuracy and its "attention-grabbing text and art". Publishers Weekly called the book "well-researched" and praised its "engaging" illustrations. Siân Gaetano of Shelf Awareness called the book "as funny and silly as it is educational and fascinating" and its "accurate historical representation", writing that it "holds no punches in explaining the history of colonialism".

Emily Van Weerdhuizen of School Library Journal praised Women's Right to Vote for its "timely perspective" and its "readable tone". Rebecca Traister of The New York Times wrote that the text was "often disconcertingly colloquial", but called the book "gratifyingly capacious" and praised the attention given to labor activists and Harriot Stanton Blatch's Equality League of Self-Supporting Women.

Kirkus Reviews called Pearl Harbor "intriguing", and praise it for explaining complex issues in a way that is accessible to young readers and for encouraging children to question simplistic historical narratives. Emily Van Weerdhuizen of School Library Journal praised it for going "beyond common knowledge" and for its "[p]age-turning prose, helpful sidebars[...], and realistic illustrations".

Plagues and Pandemics won an Outstanding Science Trade Books Award in 2022, with its stories, illustrations, and comic-style inserts being described as "captivating".

Ancient Egypt was listed among School Library Journal's Best Nonfiction Middle to High School Books of 2025, being described as "lively, informative, and visually rich". Molly Saunders of School Library Journal praised its accuracy, humorous tone, and understanding of the appeal of its subject matter.

Kirkus gave a mixed review of The Space Race, calling it "useful but unsystematic" and criticizing it for having "relatively little to say" about the Soviet space program and some other parts of its subject matter.
