= Kate Messner =

American author

- Born: 1970 or 1971 (age 55–56)
- Education: Syracuse University
- Occupation: Author
- Children: 2
- Writing career
- Years active: 2009–present
- Genres: Children's literature
- Notable awards: E. B. White Read Aloud Award; Golden Kite Award
- Website: katemessner.com

Kate Messner (born 1970 or 1971) is an American children's author. She has written over seventy books, which have sold over five million copies in over a dozen languages. She primarily writes picture books, chapter books, and middle grade novels.

== Life ==
Messner was born in 1970 or 1971, and grew up in Medina, New York as the youngest of four children. When growing up, Messner loved "everything by Beverly Cleary", especially the Ramona books.

Messner graduated from Medina High School in 1988. She then went on to attain a bachelor's degree in journalism at Syracuse University's Newhouse School of Public Communications. She worked as an intern at a TV station in the summer following her freshman year. She spent seven years as a TV news reporter and producer, before pursuing a master's degree in education. She spent fifteen years as a middle school English teacher, with her first published books being written during this time. She obtained a National Board Certification in 2006.

She lives on the New York side of Lake Champlain with her family. She has a 30-year-old son and a 24–25-year-old daughter. Her husband is part of a group that offers to help start up businesses in Vermont.

== Career ==
Messner started her writing career in 2009 with the middle grade novel The Brilliant Fall of Gianna Z, which won an E. B. White Read Aloud Award in 2010. Over the course of her writing career, she has written over seventy books, which have sold over five million copies in over a dozen languages. She won the Empire State Award for Excellence in Literature for Young People in 2022.

In 2011, Messner published the picture book Over and Under the Snow. The book won a Golden Kite Award for Picture Book Text, and was named a Notable Children's Book by the Association for Library Service to Children (ALSC). It received seven sequels.

In 2016, she published a middle grade novelThe Seventh Wish, which was met with controversy for depicting opioid addiction. The week of its release, she was disinvited from a school talk, had her books sent back from the school, and was told by a librarian at another school that her book would not appear in their collection.

In 2019, Messner published The Brilliant Deep. The novel was well received by critics. The ALSC named it on their annual list of Notable Children's Books, and it won the year's Green Earth Book Award.

Her 2021 picture book Dr. Fauci, a biography of Anthony Fauci, reached the New York Times Children's Picture Book Best Seller List on July 18, 2021.

She is the head a three-year-long multi-author project titled The Kids of Mrs. Z's Class, an eighteen-book series about the children of one elementary school class. Each author creates a character who would serve as the lead of their book and features as a secondary character in the rest of the books of the series. Messner wrote the first book, Emma McKenna, Full Out, which was released in 2024. She will also write the final book, which has not yet been published.

In 2025, she published The Trouble with Heroes, which she wrote while climbing all 46 Adirondack Mountains over the course of eight years.

In 2026, she published her first graphic novel, Camp Monster, with art by Falynn Koch, who also illustrated five books in Messner's History Smashers series. It is the first in a series.

== Works ==
=== Novels ===
==== Standalone novels ====
- The Brilliant Fall of Gianna Z. Bloomsbury Children's Books. September 1, 2009. ISBN 978-0802798428.
- Sugar and Ice. Bloomsbury Children’s Books. December 7, 2010. ISBN 978-0802720818.
- Eye of the Storm. Bloomsbury Children’s Books. February 28, 2012. ISBN 978-0802723130.
- Wake Up Missing. Bloomsbury Children’s Books. September 10, 2013. ISBN 978-0802723147.
- All the Answers. Bloomsbury Children’s Books. January 27, 2015. ISBN 978-1619633742.
- The Seventh Wish. Bloomsbury Children’s Books. June 7, 2016. ISBN 978-1619633766.
- The Exact Location of Home. Bloomsbury Children’s Books. September 12, 2017. ISBN 978-1681195483.
- Breakout. Bloomsbury Children’s Books. June 5, 2018. ISBN 978-1681195360.
- Chirp. Bloomsbury Children’s Books. February 4, 2020. ISBN 978-1547602810.
- The Trouble with Heroes. Bloomsbury Children’s Books. April 29, 2025. ISBN 978-1547616398.

==== Silver Jaguar Society Mysteries ====
- Capture the Flag. Scholastic Press. July 1, 2012. ISBN 978-0545419741.
- Hide and Seek. Scholastic Press. April 1, 2013. ISBN 978-0545419758.
- Manhunt. Scholastic Press. July 1, 2014. ISBN 978-0545419772.

=== Chapter books ===
==== Marty McGuire ====
- Marty McGuire. Illustrated by Brian Floca. Scholastic Press. May 1, 2011. ISBN 978-0545142465.
- Marty McGuire Digs Worms!. Illustrated by Brian Floca. Scholastic Press. April 1, 2012. ISBN 978-0545142472.
- Marty McGuire Has Too Many Pets!. Illustrated by Brian Floca. Scholastic Press. April 28, 2015. ISBN 978-0545535601.

==== Ranger in Time ====
- Rescue on the Oregon Trail. Scholastic Press. January 6, 2015. ISBN 978-0545639149.
- Danger in Ancient Rome. Scholastic Press. June 30, 2015. ISBN 978-0545639187.
- Long Road to Freedom. Scholastic Press. December 29, 2015. ISBN 978-0545639217.
- Race to the South Pole. Scholastic Press. June 28, 2016. ISBN 978-0545639255.
- Journey Through Ash and Smoke. Scholastic Press. January 31, 2017. ISBN 978-0545909785.
- Escape from the Great Earthquake. Scholastic Press. June 27, 2017. ISBN 978-0545909839.
- D-Day: Battle on the Beach. Scholastic Press. January 30, 2018. ISBN 978-1338133905.
- Hurricane Katrina Rescue. Scholastic Press. June 26, 2018. ISBN 978-1338133950.
- Disaster on the Titanic. Scholastic Press. January 29, 2019. ISBN 978-1338133981.
- Night of Soldiers and Spies. Scholastic Press. July 9, 2019. ISBN 978-1338134018.
- Escape from the Twin Towers. Scholastic Press. February 4, 2020. ISBN 978-1338537949.
- Attack on Pearl Harbor. Scholastic Press. July 21, 2020. ISBN 978-1338537963.

==== The Kids in Mrs. Z's Class ====
- Emma McKenna, Full Out. Illustrated by Kat Fajardo. Algonquin Young Readers. April 30, 2024. ISBN 978-1523525713.

==== Wildlife Rescue ====
- How to Save an Otter. Bloomsbury Children’s Books. October 21, 2025. ISBN 978-1547616428.
- How to Save an Owl. Bloomsbury Children’s Books. October 21, 2025. ISBN 978-1547616466.
- How to Save a Tortoise. Bloomsbury Children’s Books. March 3, 2026. ISBN 978-1547616497.

=== Picture books ===
==== Standalone picture books ====
- Sea Monster's First Day. Illustrated by Andy Rash. Chronicle Books. June 22, 2011. ISBN 978-0811875646.
- Sea Monster and the Bossy Fish. Illustrated by Andy Rash. Chronicle Books. August 1, 2013. ISBN 978-1452112534.
- How to Read a Story. Illustrated by Mark Siegel. Chronicle Books. May 5, 2015. ISBN 978-1452112336.
- Tree of Wonder: The Many Marvelous Lives of a Rainforest Tree. Illustrated by Simona Mulazzani. Chronicle Books. August 11, 2015. ISBN 978-1452112480.
- Rolling Thunder. Illustrated by Greg Ruth. Chronicle Books. August 25, 2017. ISBN 978-0545470124.
- The Brilliant Deep: Rebuilding the World's Coral Reefs. Illustrated by Matthew Forsythe. Chronicle Books. May 8, 2018. ISBN 978-1452133508.
- Insect Superpowers. Illustrated by Jillian Nickell. Chronicle Books. November 5, 2019. ISBN 978-1452139104.
- How to Write a Story. Illustrated by Mark Siegel. Chronicle Books. July 7, 2020. ISBN 978-1452156668.
- The Next President: The Unexpected Beginnings and Unwritten Future of America's Presidents. Illustrated by Adam Rex. Chronicle Books. March 24, 2020. ISBN 978-1452174884.
- Sloth Wasn't Sleepy. Illustrated by Valentina Toro. Sounds True. January 12, 2021. ISBN 978-1683645467.
- Dr. Fauci: How a Boy from Brooklyn Became America's Doctor. Illustrated by Alexandra Bye. Simon & Schuster Books for Young Readers. June 29, 2021. ISBN 978-1665902434.
- Only the Best: The Exceptional Life and Fashion of Ann Lowe. Co-written by Margaret E. Powell. Illustrated by Erin Robinson. Chronicle Books. October 18, 2022. ISBN 978-1452161600.
- Once Upon a Book. Illustrated by Grace Lin. Little, Brown Books for Young Readers. February 7, 2023. ISBN 978-0316541077.
- The Scariest Kitten in the World. Illustrated by MacKenzie Haley. Farrar, Straus and Giroux. August 29, 2023. ISBN 978-0374390051.
- The Next Scientist: The Unexpected Beginnings and Unwritten Future of the World’s Great Scientists. Illustrated by Julia Kuo. Chronicle Books. August 27, 2024. ISBN 978-1452176963.
- First Ascent: The Epic Yosemite Rock-Climbing Rivalry of Royal Robbins and Warren Harding. Illustrated by Stevie Lewis. Yosemite Conservancy. August 5, 2025. ISBN 978-1951179335.
- The Whale's Tale and the Otter's Side of the Story. Illustrated by Brian Biggs. Clarion Books. April 21, 2026. ISBN 978-0063372627.
- Axolotl-Ella. Illustrated by Lian Cho. Ten Speed Young Readers. June 2, 2026. ISBN 978-0593837993.

==== Over and Under ====
- Over and Under the Snow. Illustrated by Christopher Silas Neal. Chronicle Books. October 9, 2011. ISBN 978-0811867849.
- Up in the Garden and Down in the Dirt. Illustrated by Christopher Silas Neal. Chronicle Books. March 3, 2015. ISBN 978-1452119366.
- Over and Under the Pond. Illustrated by Christopher Silas Neal. Chronicle Books. March 7, 2017. ISBN 978-1452145426.
- Over and Under the Rainforest. Illustrated by Christopher Silas Neal. Chronicle Books. August 11, 2020. ISBN 978-1452169408.
- Over and Under the Canyon. Illustrated by Christopher Silas Neal. Chronicle Books. September 7, 2021. ISBN 978-1452169392.
- Over and Under the Waves. Illustrated by Christopher Silas Neal. Chronicle Books. September 13, 2022. ISBN 978-1797203478.
- Over and Under the Wetland. Illustrated by Christopher Silas Neal. Chronicle Books. August 13, 2024. ISBN 978-1797210872.
- Over and Under the Coral Reef. Illustrated by Christopher Silas Neal. Chronicle Books. August 26, 2025. ISBN 978-1797225357.

=== Easy readers ===
==== Fergus and Zeke ====
- Fergus and Zeke. Illustrated by Heather Ross. Candlewick Press. June 13, 2017. ISBN 978-0763678463.
- Fergus and Zeke at the Science Fair. Illustrated by Heather Ross. Candlewick Press. September 18, 2018. ISBN 978-0763678470.
- Fergus and Zeke and the Field Day Challenge. Illustrated by Heather Ross. Candlewick Press. April 14, 2020. ISBN 978-1536202021.
- Fergus and Zeke and the 100th Day of School. Illustrated by Heather Ross. Candlewick Press. December 14, 2021. ISBN 978-1536213003.
- Fergus and Zeke for President. Illustrated by Heather Ross. Candlewick Press. May 23, 2023. ISBN 978-1536218312.
- Fergus and Zeke and the Great Farm Field Trip. Illustrated by Heather Ross. Candlewick Press. May 7, 2024. ISBN 978-1536227611.

=== Nonfiction ===
==== Standalone nonfiction ====
- Solve This! Forensics. Co-written by Anne Rupert. National Geographic Children's Books. March 17, 2020. ISBN 978-1426337444.

===== Books for teachers =====
- Real Revision: Authors' Strategies to Share with Student Writers. Stenhouse Publishers. June 28, 2011. ISBN 978-1571108562.
- 59 Reasons to Write. Stenhouse Publishers. January 28, 2015. ISBN 978-1625310033.

==== History Smashers ====
- The Mayflower. Illustrated by Dylan Meconis. Random House. July 7, 2020. ISBN 978-0593120316.
- Women's Right to Vote. Illustrated by Dylan Meconis. Random House. July 7, 2020. ISBN 978-0593120347.
- Pearl Harbor. Illustrated by Dylan Meconis. Random House. November 10, 2020. ISBN 978-0593120385.
- The Titanic. Illustrated by Dylan Meconis. Random House. February 2, 2021. ISBN 978-0593120446.
- The American Revolution. Illustrated by Justin Greenwood. Random House. July 20, 2021. ISBN 978-0593120460.
- Plagues and Pandemics. Illustrated by Falynn Koch. Random House. October 5, 2021. ISBN 978-0593120408.
- The Underground Railroad. Co-written by Gwendolyn Hooks. Illustrated by Damon Smyth. Random House. May 17, 2022. ISBN 978-0593428931.
- Christopher Columbus and the Taino People. Co-written by José Barreiro. Illustrated by Falynn Koch. Random House. August 8, 2023. ISBN 978-0593564264.
- Salem Witch Trials. Illustrated by Falynn Koch. Random House. August 13, 2024. ISBN 978-0593705278.
- Earth Day and the Environment. Illustrated by Justin Greenwood. Random House. March 11, 2025. ISBN 978-0593705308.
- Ancient Egypt. Illustrated by Falynn Koch. Random House. October 7, 2025. ISBN 978-0593902332.
- The Space Race. Illustrated by Falynn Koch. Random House. July 21, 2026. ISBN 978-0593902363.

==== Tracking Animals ====
- Tracking Pythons: The Quest to Catch an Invasive Predator and Save an Ecosystem. Millbrook Press. March 3, 2020. ISBN 978-1541557062.
- Tracking Tortoises: The Mission to Save a Galápagos Giant. Millbrook Press. September 7, 2021. ISBN 978-1541596115.

=== Graphic novels ===
- Camp Monster. Illustrated by Falynn Koch. Bloomsbury Children’s Books. February 3, 2026. ISBN 978-1547609413.
