= Over and Under the Snow =

2011 children's book by Kate Messner

- First edition hardcover
- Author: Kate Messner
- Illustrator: Christopher Silas Neal
- Language: English
- Genre: Picture book
- Publisher: Chronicle Books
- Publication date: October 5, 2011
- Publication place: United States
- Pages: 44
- ISBN: 9780811867849
- Followed by: Up in the Garden and Down in the Dirt

Over and Under the Snow is a picture book by American author Kate Messner. It was published on October 5, 2011 by Chronicle Books.

== Plot ==
While cross-country skiing with her father, a young girl learns about the animals living in "the secret kingdom under the snow". She then goes to bed and dreams about the animals. The book ends with an author's note explaining the subnivean zone. It then provides a list of animals that "eat, sleep, hide, and play over and under the winter snow."

== Reception ==
The book won a Golden Kite Award for Picture Book Text in 2012. It was nominated for a Virginia Readers Choice Award in 2014 and a Monarch Award in 2015. It was listed as one of the ten picture books on the New York Times' Notable Children's Books of 2011 list.

Kirkus Reviews called it "[u]tterly charming, and informative, to boot". Publishers Weekly praised Messner's "graceful" prose.

== Audiobook ==
An audiobook narrated by Laura Knight Keating was released by Recorded Books on November 28, 2014. C.A. Fehmel of School Library Journal praised Keating's "lovely tone", but called the sibilance "a bit grating".

== Sequels ==
The book received seven sequels. Up in the Garden and Down in the Dirt was published on March 3, 2015 and explored animals living in gardens. Over and Under the Pond was published on March 7, 2017 and explored animals living in mountain ponds. Over and Under the Rainforest was published on August 11, 2020 and explored animals living in the rainforests of Central America. Over and Under the Canyon was published on September 7, 2021 and explored animals living in desert canyons. Over and Under the Waves was published on September 13, 2022 and explored animals living in the ocean. Over and Under the Wetland was published on August 13, 2024 and explored animals living in Everglades National Park. Over and Under the Coral Reef was published on August 26, 2025 and explored animals living in the coral reef of Grand Cayman.
