= Katsi Cook =

Mohawk midwife and women's health activist

- Born: Sherrill Elizabeth Tekatsitsiakawa Cook; January 4, 1952 (age 74); St. Regis Mohawk Reservation
- Citizenship: Saint Regis Mohawk Tribe and U.S.
- Education: Skidmore College, Dartmouth College, Cornell University

Sherrill Elizabeth Tekatsitsiakawa "Katsi" (pronounced Gudji) Cook is a Mohawk Native American midwife, environmentalist, Native American rights activist, and women's health advocate. She is best known for her environmental justice and reproductive health research in her home community, the Mohawk Nation at Akwesasne in upstate New York.

She is the director of Running Strong for American Indian Youth and founder of the organization's Woman is the First Environment Collaborative which supports community-based health projects seeks that seek to empower Native women of all ages and increase knowledge concerning reproductive health. She has founded a number of organizations serving the Akwesasne community, including the Women's Dance Health Program, the Mother's Milk Monitoring Project, and the Konon:kwe Council.

Cook has stated that "Women are the first environment. We are an embodiment of our Mother Earth. From the bodies of women flows the relationship of the generations both to society and the natural world. With our bodies we nourish, sustain and create connected relationships and interdependence. In this way the Earth is our mother, our ancestors said. In this way, we as women are earth."

== Early life and education ==
The youngest of four children, Katsi Cook was born on 4 January 1952, to Kawennaien Evelyn Mountour Cook and William John Cook on the St. Regis Mohawk Reservation, or the Mohawk Nation of Akwesasne. Her father, a graduate of Dartmouth College, was a pilot who fought in World War II and the Korean War. He died in a plane accident when Cook was nine months old. Her mother was raised in Quebec and educated by Catholic nuns, but died when Cook was 11 years old. During the remainder of her childhood, Katsi Cook lived with her paternal grandmother, Kanatires Elizabeth Herne Cook, a midwife who had delivered Cook as well as many other children at Akwesasne.

Katsi Cook was educated at Catholic boarding school, though she began practicing the traditional Longhouse Religion as a teenager. She attended Skidmore College from 1970 to 1972, and then transferred to Dartmouth College as a part of the school's first class of women. Shortly thereafter, she left school in order to participate in the American Indian Movement (AIM).

Cook later returned to complete her undergraduate degree in Biology and Society in the School of Human Ecology at Cornell University in the mid-1980s.

== Education and career ==
Between 1972 and 1977, and then again from 1979 to 1983, Cook and Barreiro worked with the Kanienkehaka Longhouse Council of Chiefs on Akwesasne Notes, a newspaper that published articles from around the country relevant to or written about the Akwesasne community.

Cook decided to pursue midwifery in 1977 after attending the Loon Lake Conference of the Six Nations. Speakers at the conference emphasized the important role traditional birthing practices play in enabling Native women to reclaim sovereignty over their bodies; control over reproduction was also seen as a method to reclaim Native sovereignty in and of itself. She completed a spiritual midwifery apprenticeship at The Farm in Tennessee in 1978, followed by clinical training at the University of New Mexico Women's Health Training Program.

Cook also attended the founding meeting of Women of all Red Nations (WARN) in 1978 and later did a clinical placement at the Red Schoolhouse Clinic, a WARN project in St Paul, Minnesota. There she founded the Women's Dance Health Project as a community-based initiative. Cook moved back to Akwesasne in 1980 after finding a group of women to continue the project.

At Akwesasne, Cook continued to practice midwifery which included providing prenatal care, delivery, post-partum care, family planning, family counseling, and other services. She also helped found the Akwesasne Freedom School – an independent school which teaches K-8th grades – in 1979. Around the same time, Cook established the Women's Dance Health Program at Akwesasne.

The St. Lawrence River that runs through Akwesasne and the reservation land itself are in proximity to General Motors (GM) plants and waste dumps. In 1981, the New York State Department of Environmental Conservation (NYS DEC) announced that Polychlorinated biphenyls (PCB) had been found in the groundwater under GM property, and later in private wells on the St. Regis Mohawk reservation. Researchers from Mount Sinai had been taking samples from animals and soil on the reservation since the 1970s, though they had never checked how the environmental contamination was affecting community-members, notably breast-feeding mothers' milk. This coincided with growing concerns in the community surrounding high numbers of miscarriages and birth defects, which have been shown to be a consequence of exposure to PCBs. Beginning in the 1980s, Cook began conducting research to better understand the intersection of environmental degradation and maternal and fetal health. She has stated that challenges facing indigenous communities, like environmental pollution and reproductive health, must be understood and addressed in a way that acknowledges their intersecting nature, as opposed to viewing them as independent problems.

Cook has also spoken extensively about the ways in which these types of environmental degradation have harmed indigenous communities' way of life. For instance, due to the Saint Lawrence River's PCB contamination, the New York State Department of Health recommends very limited consumption of fish caught from the river. According to Cook, this pollution has been detrimental to Akwesasne culture: "Fishing is more than throwing a line and bait into the water. Children learned about our culture and their world on that river. Our social practices and identity are tied into the flowing water – its quality of life directly correlates to the life around it." She says that fewer children are now learning traditional skills like fishing because of the contamination.

As she pursued her undergraduate degree Cornell University in 1984, Cook, along with Lin Nelson, Janet Rith-Najarian, Doug Brown, spoke with Brian Bush, a chemist at the New York State Department of Health (NYSDOH) about establishing a breast milk study at Akwesasne. In 1985, the Women's Dance Health Program became the Mother's Milk Monitoring Project which continues to provide services and advocacy to this day. In subsequent environmental research on the reservation, Cook would be a bridge between the Akwesasne community, scientists, and government workers.

Cook has been active part of national and international women's health movements which includes her work alongside Mayan midwives in Guatemala. She was the founding aboriginal midwife of the Six Nations Birthing Centre in Ontario, Canada which is home to an Aboriginal Midwifery Training Program and participates in community education initiatives. She serves on the board of the National Women's Health Network and the National Aboriginal Council of Midwives of Canada which oversees the drafting of midwifery legislation to assure that indigenous rights are respected. According to Cook, the council's goal is to have an aboriginal midwife in every aboriginal community.

In 2009, she co-founded the Konon:kwe Council, a woman-led, community-based council in Akwesasne which seeks to empower women in the community and advance woman-centered policies to stunt cycles of violence in the community.

Cook has served as a program director for the Spirit Aligned Leadership Program and the Indigenous Communities Leadership Program for Indigenous Girls and Women of the NoVo Foundation, a non-profit organization working to support women and girls in minority communities.

=== Work in academia and fellowships ===
Between 1994 and 1998, Cook was a lecturer in the Department of Environmental Health and Toxicology at the State University New York (SUNY) at Albany School of Public Health as well as a visiting fellow at Cornell University's American Indian Program. In 2001, she was the Dr. T.J. Murray Visiting Scholar in Medical Humanities at Dalhousie University and later gave lectures on alternative and complementary therapies at the SUNY Buffalo Medical School and at Cornell University. In 2004 and 2005, Cook was the recipient of the Indigenous Knowledge Cultural Research Award from the Indigenous Health Research Development Program at the University of Toronto. In 2008, Cook's papers were integrated into the Sophia Smith Collection at Smith College. In 2011, she was accepted as a Reach the Decision Makers (Reach) Fellow within the University of California at San Francisco's (UCSF) Program on Reproductive Health and the Environment.

== Articles and media ==
Cook has written multiple news articles for Indian Country Today. All of her scholarly articles are a part of the Sophia Smith Collection at Smith College. In 2007, she was a featured speaker at Live Earth Concert at the National Museum of the American Indian in Washington, D.C.

== Personal life ==
Cook married José Eugenio Barreiro, a Cuban-born academic and indigenous activist in the early 1970s. They have five children and eight grandchildren.
