= The Trouble with Heroes =

2025 novel by Kate Messner

- First edition hardcover
- Author: Kate Messner
- Cover artist: Jeanette Levy
- Language: English
- Genre: Middle grade; verse novel
- Publisher: Bloomsbury Children's Books
- Publication date: April 29, 2025
- Publication place: United States
- Pages: 368
- ISBN: 9781547616404

The Trouble with Heroes is a middle grade verse novel by American author Kate Messner. It was published by Bloomsbury Children's Books on April 29, 2025. The novel follows thirteen-year-old Finn Connolly, who must climb all 46 Adirondack High Peaks in one summer while also completing a poetry assignment about heroes, a term often used to describe his late father, a firefighter-turned-paramedic. It received positive reviews from critics upon release.

== Background ==
Messner climbed all of the Adirondack High Peaks over the span of eight years. The story started in 2015 when she first started climbing the mountains, and would find herself writing poetry upon reaching a summit. As she was writing, she discovered that she was not writing in her own voice, but in a younger, snarkier voice, and so she started to think about a character who was climbing the peaks out of obligation rather than choice. When she realized that Finn's story would be best told in verse, she shelved the story for almost two years because she was not yet a strong enough poet to pull it off. When the COVID-19 pandemic hit in 2020, she and her family began hiking again. While hiking, she met people who would inspire the "trail nannies" who would accompany Finn on his hike, as well as hiking dogs that served as the inspiration for Seymour.

The poems for the novel were written out of order, making it the first book where Messner had not written her scenes in order. She began arranging them in order once she had about seventy poems written.

== Style ==
The novel is a multimedia novel written primarily in verse, featuring various forms of poetry such as haiku, sonnets, and found poetry. It also includes letters, text messages, cookie recipes, choose-your-own-disaster sequences, news articles, school progress reports, and photographs taken from the Adirondack Mountains. It is narrated in first person.

== Synopsis ==
Two years after the death of his father, Finn Connelly is on the verge of failing seventh grade. In his grief and anger, Finn Connelly gets caught on camera kicking over a gravestone. The gravestone belongs to Edna Grace Thomas, the first woman to hike all of the Adirondack High Peaks, and her daughter offers to drop all charges if he climbs all forty-six mountains in a single summer while bringing her mother's Bernese Mountain Dog Seymour along. While attempting the hike, Finn must also complete an overdue English assignment to write at least twenty poems on the topic of heroes. In doing so, Finn grapples with his complicated feelings about his father, a local hockey star who served as a firefighter during 9/11 and died on the front lines of the COVID-19 pandemic as a paramedic, but was also frequently absent from his family and struggled with PTSD and alcoholism.

== Reception ==
The novel was nominated for a Texas Bluebonnet Award. It received a Charlotte Huck Honor. It was included on Publishers Weekly's, School Library Journal's, Kirkus', and Chicago Public Library's best middle grade books of 2025 lists. It was the #1 pick for the May/June 2025 Kids' Indie Next List. It was featured on Read with Jenna Junior's 2025 summer reading list. It was also featured on NCTE's 2026 Notable Children's Poetry Books and Verse Novels List. It was featured on the Child Mind Institute 2025 Best Children's Books About Mental Health list for its depiction of grief. The audiobook, narrated by Mack Gordan, was nominated for an Audie Award for Middle Grade Title.

Kirkus Reviews wrote that the novel "vividly conveys a disgruntled teenager's feelings", and praised its "authentic voice". Tracy Cronce of School Library Journal called the novel "breathtaking and deeply satisfying" and praised its "[b]eautiful, factual" descriptions of each mountain. Publishers Weekly praised its "moving and profoundly funny verse and prose". Jaclyn Fulwood of Shelf Awareness called the novel "unforgettable" and praised its "emotionally potent" narrative. Matt de la Peña called it a "timely, enduring story" in his review for The New York Times.
