= The Seventh Wish =

2016 children's book by Kate Messner

- First edition cover art
- Author: Kate Messner
- Cover artist: Colleen Andrews
- Language: English
- Genre: Middle grade; magical realism
- Publisher: Bloomsbury Publishing
- Publication date: June 7, 2016
- Publication place: United States
- Pages: 240
- ISBN: 9781681194318

The Seventh Wish is a middle grade magical realism novel by American author Kate Messner. It was published on June 7, 2016 by Bloomsbury Publishing. It centers a twelve-year-old girl who finds a talking fish who can grant wishes, and discovers that her older sister has become addicted to heroin. It received positive reviews from critics, but was met with controversy from schools for its subject matter.

== Synopsis ==
Twelve-year-old Charlie Brennan starts ice fishing with her neighbor Drew and his grandmother, with the plans of selling the fish to earn money so she can buy an Irish dancing dress. One day, she reels in a fish that offers her a wish in exchange for being released back into the water. While she does not believe it could be real, she makes a wish anyway, wishing for her crush Roberto Sullivan to fall in love with her, only for a boy named Robert O'Sullivan to fall for her instead. As she makes wishes for other people, the wishes continue having unintended consequences, and she finds that her wishes do not always make things better. When she learns that her college-aged sister Abby has become addicted to heroin, she struggles to reconcile the image of her high-achieving sister with the image of heroin users painted to her by the D.A.R.E program at school, and tries to wish away her addiction.

== Reception ==
The novel was a Charlotte Huck Recommended Book.

Kirkus Reviews called the novel "[h]opeful, empathetic, and unusually enlightening", and praised Charlie's world for being "fully realized". School Library Journal called the novel "at once fantastical while also emotionally arresting", and wrote that it "offers a sensitive and empathetic view of addiction through a genuinely compelling, character-driven narrative." Publishers Weekly praised it for "humanizing a growing epidemic". In her review for The Bulletin of the Center for Children's Books, Amy Atkinson called the novel "enjoyable and informative" and praised its "relatable protagonist".

The novel was met with controversy for depicting heroin addiction. The week of its release, she was disinvited from a school talk, had her books sent back from the school, and was told by a librarian at another school that her book would not appear in their collection.
