= Diego Columbus (Lucayan) =

Lucayan Taíno adopted son of Christopher Columbus

- Diego Colón
- Closeup of Pinturicchio's Resurrection of the Christ within the Borgia Apartments of the Vatican, believed to depict the six Native Americans brought to Spain by Columbus (1494).
- Born: c. 1478; Guanahani
- Died: c. 1519; Santo Domingo, Spanish West Indies
- Known for: Adopted son of Christopher Columbus
- Spouse: Cora
- Children: Diego Colón (d. 1506)

Diego Columbus (Spanish: Diego Colón, before 1492 – after 1514) was a Lucayan taken from the island of Guanahani and adopted by Christopher Columbus.

Diego's Lucayan name is unknown, but he was an inhabitant of Guanahani (later San Salvador) in October 1492, when Christopher Columbus made landfall during his first voyage. During the fleet's stay at the island from October 12–14, Columbus abducted seven of the Lucayan inhabitants for use as guides and translators, including the future Diego. Believed to have been 13–15 years of age, he seemingly distinguished himself to Columbus throughout the voyage due to his notable intelligence and rapid acquisition of Spanish customs.

Diego was one of ten Natives (Note: The other nine being two sons of Cacique Guacanagari and another seven Hispaniolans. One would die of illness on the Niña during the return journey, followed by another three in Seville during the journey to Barcelona. Diego was notably the only member of the group spared from illness in Spain.) taken back to Spain aboard the Niña (Note: The Santa María had been wrecked on a sand bank on December 25.) in January 1493. Arriving at Palos de la Frontera in March, he was taken to and presented to the Royal Court in Barcelona with the other Natives in April. There they became the first Native Americans to be baptized during a ceremony officiated by Cardinal Pedro González de Mendoza, following which he was adopted by Columbus, receiving the name Diego.

By the time of Columbus' second voyage in 1493, all ten Natives were either sick with or died from contracted disease, with the exception of Diego. Returning with three others to Hispaniola later that year, Diego became Columbus' chief interpreter and played a vital role in discovering the fate of the fort of La Navidad which had been left under the watch of Cacique Guacanagari during the first voyage.

Diego served Columbus faithfully during his remaining time in the Indies, with Columbus negotiating a marriage between Diego and Cora, the sister of Guarionex, another Hispaniolan Cacique. This marriage produced one son, also named Diego, who was later sent to be educated in Castile but died of an illness in 1506.

Confined to Santo Domingo for the remainder of his life, the last record of Diego is dated to 1514. His longtime colleague, Bartolomé de las Casas, claimed to have met with him in the years after.

A deadly smallpox epidemic would sweep Hispaniola in 1519, after which Diego Columbus is no longer listed in official records.

== In fiction ==
José Barreiro's The Indian Chronicles consists of a fictionalized memoir written by Diego reflecting on the events of his life.
