= Virginia Association of Science Teachers =

Comprehensive educational organization

The Virginia Association of Science Teachers, Inc. (VAST) is a non-profit 501(c)(3) organization.

VAST is a comprehensive educational organization dedicated to the nurturing and advancement of superior science education. Its objectives are to advance the study of science, to promote excellence in the teaching of science and to provide opportunity for communication among science educators in the Commonwealth of Virginia.

Leadership is provided by promoting the study of science at all grade-levels, supporting conditions which ensure an optimal environment for the teaching of science, advocating high quality science instruction for all students at all levels and by providing an avenue for communication among the members of the science education community.

Formed in 1952, it is the Virginia chapter affiliated with the National Science Teachers Association.
