= Mark Siegel =

Cartoonist and publisher

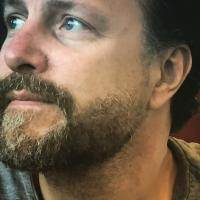
- Born: Ann Arbor, Michigan
- Areas: Writer, Artist, Editor
- Notable works: "5 Worlds" "Sailor Twain, or the Mermaid in the Hudson" "To Dance" "Tiny Dancer" "Oskar and the Eight Blessings" "Long Night Moon"

Mark Siegel (born June 2, 1967, in Ann Arbor, Michigan) is known both as an author, illustrator, and as the editorial director of First Second Books, a Macmillan imprint which publishes graphic novels for all ages. He grew up in France until the age of 18, after which he moved back to the United States where he presently lives.

== Career ==
=== Published works ===
His books in print to date include Seadogs, An Epic Ocean Operetta (on a script by children's author Lisa Wheeler), Long Night Moon (on a script by author Cynthia Rylant), To Dance (on a script by his wife Siena Cherson Siegel), Moving House, his first picture book as author and illustrator.

He also illustrated Oskar and the Eight Blessings (on a script by Tanya and Richard Simon), winner of the 2015 National Jewish Book Award for Children's Literature; and How to Read a Story (on a script by Kate Messner.)

Siegel is the author of the graphic novel for adults Sailor Twain, or the Mermaid in the Hudson (2012), which was serialized online starting in 2010, a New York Times Bestseller. A 10th Anniversary edition of Sailor Twain was published in 2022, in a larger format and with additional back matter on the making of the work.

In 2017, Siegel launched the 5 Worlds graphic novel series, a five-volume science fiction story co-written with his brother Alexis Siegel, and illustrated with Matt Rockefeller, Xanthe Bouma, and Boya Sun.

- Book one: The Sand Warrior (2017)
- Book two: The Cobalt Prince (2018)
- Book three: The Red Maze (2019)
- Book four: The Amber Anthem (2020)
- Book five: The Emerald Gate (2022)

In 2020, he and Kate Messner released a sequel to their picture book How to Read a Story, called How to Write a Story.

In 2022, another collaboration with his wife Siena Cherson Siegel came out, the graphic novel memoir for young adults Tiny Dancer.

=== First Second Books, graphic novel publisher ===
Siegel is also the founder and Editorial & Creative Director of First Second Books, a Macmillan publisher of graphic novels for all ages. First Second publishes works by many acclaimed authors and artists, including Ben Hatke, Gene Luen Yang, Jillian Tamaki, Vera Brosgol, Jen Wang, Shannon Hale, LeUyen Pham, and the legendary Japanese director Hayao Miyazaki.

In 2006, First Second published American Born Chinese by Gene Luen Yang, the first graphic novel ever nominated for a National Book Award, and the first ever to win the American Library Association's Edward L. Printz Award.

In 2015, First Second published This One Summer by the cousins Jillian and Mariko Tamaki, the first book in any format ever nominated as a finalist for both the American Library Association's Randolph Caldecott Award, and the American Library Association's Edward L. Printz Award.

Some of First Second's biggest hits include The Adventure Zone graphic novel series, the InvestiGators series, and the Real Friends trilogy. First Second also publishes graphic non-fiction for young readers including the Science Comics and History Comics collections, and for adults, including the World Citizen Comics, a line of civics graphic books, and biographical works such as The Accidental Czar.

=== Lectures and workshops ===
Siegel has given lectures and workshops around North America, for authors, artists, librarians, students, executives in many venues, at trade shows, companies, Comic Cons, and animation studios, including Blue Sky, DreamWorks, Disney, and Pixar.

== Awards ==
- In 2006, Siegel won the Texas Bluebonnet Award for Seadogs, An Epic Ocean Operetta, written by Lisa Wheeler.
- In 2007, Siegel and his wife, Siena Cherson Siegel, won a Sibert Honor for To Dance: A Ballerina's Graphic Novel.
- In 2015, Siegel and co-authors Tanya and Richard Simon won the Jewish National Book Award for Oskar and the Eight Blessings.
- In 2017, the New York Public Library selected 5 Worlds: The Sand Warrior in its Top Ten Best Books for Kids of 2017.
