= Sailor Twain =

2012 graphic novel

Sailor Twain, or The Mermaid in the Hudson is a graphic novel, written and drawn by Mark Siegel and published in 2012 by First Second Books.

== Plot summary ==
The story takes place in 1887 in the Hudson Valley, on the steamboat Lorelei. Sailor Twain is told in a series of flashbacks, starting with the night that Elijah Twain, the captain of the ship, finds an injured mermaid clinging to the deck. He hides the mermaid in his quarters and gives her medical care. In turn, she breaks his writer's block and inspires him to create. When in port, Twain visits with his wife, Pearl; who uses a wheelchair. It is implied that their relationship is straining, and is seen frequently leaving her to be at the Lorelei with the mermaid.

The owner of the Lorelei, Lafayette, begins to act strangely after his brother drowns under mysterious circumstances. A notorious lady's man, he takes his courtship with the women who board the Lorelei very seriously. Lafayette also spends his time poring over a volume about the history of the occult in the Hudson Valley written by C.G. Beaverton, and is seen throwing messages in bottles out in the river. Twain notices his strange behavior, and becomes suspicious of Lafayette when the mermaid vanishes from his quarters.

Life aboard the Lorelei grows tumultuous as Lafayette and Twain search for the missing mermaid. Lafayette believes the mermaid's song was responsible for his brother's death and has sworn to break her spell by killing her, or by finding seven loves, as C.G. Beaverton's book advises. Twain, driven by lust and creative frustration, tries to protect the mermaid from Lafayette.

When the reclusive Beaverton pays the Lorelei a visit in response to Lafayette's letters, it is revealed that the author is female, and destined to be Lafayette's seventh and truest love. The mermaid, restored to health, asks Twain to aid her in breaking a curse put on her by her father. By using a magical pendant Twain follows her to her undersea lair, only to find the shadows of the mermaid's past victims. After hearing the Mermaids song, they were dragged underwater with her. They were split into two, half of their souls eternally bound to the mermaid.

On the Lorelei, Lafayette and Beaverton consummate their love, and the mermaid's spell over him is broken. In breaking her spell, Lafayette has also denied the mermaid her chance to break the curse. Engraged, the mermaid screams her song, causing Twain to split in two like the other victims. While the Sunken Clone Twain tries to console her, the real Twain runs into Lafayette's brother, previously victimized by the Siren. He gives him a Russian nesting doll and instructs him to give it to Lafayette. The brother helps Twain to the surface before sharing a kiss with his estranged lover, a singer who was caught in the sirens song, dragging them both down. In the middle of their kiss, the mermaid destroys them both, and instructs Clone Twain to “Avenge her” by killing Real Twain and Lafayette.

On the boat, Real Twain discovers a letter from his wife, saying she has moved to California to pursue a cure for her condition, hoping that would make Twain love her again. He finds Laffayete soon after and gives him the doll. The doll has seven layers(representing the seven lovers), with a second gateway pendant found within the innermost one. Lafayette grabs the pendant and runs over to Beaverton's quarters. He gives her the pendant, stuffs cotton in her ears and instructs her to leave the boat. The two share a loving kiss. Clone twain confronts Real Twain and attempts to entice him to his side, saying they could still help the Siren together. Real twain resists, and the two engage in a brawl.

While all this is happening, a frustrated ship employee has sabotaged the boiler, causing steam to start building up at the ships bottom.

Lafayette, ears stuffed with cotton, grabs a rifle and runs to the front of the ship. He spots the mermaid and aims down his gun. The mermaid, desperate, screams her song into the air, catching everyone onboard with her magic. Clone twain mocks Laffayete, stating that bullets are useless(this might not be true, considering a harpoon severely wounded her). Lafayette smiles and takes off his ear plugs, exposing himself to the song. To the mermaid's surprise, he's seemingly immune, his love for Beaverton likely shielding him from the effects. Lafayette is ready to pull the trigger, but the 2 Twain's brawl sends them careening into the river. Distracting him in the critical second. The buildup of steam in the boiler soon becomes too great, and the entire boat explodes from the pressure. Lafayette and all of the passengers are killed in the resulting blast, but both the Mermaid and Beaverton survive. Underwater, one of the Twain clones stabs the other in the chest with a harpoon.

The book's epilogue has Twain concluding telling the tale to Beaverton, and it is revealed that it was the Clone Twain all along telling the story, having taken the form of Real Twain. Beaverton, baffled, leaves the bar and heads to the marina. Clone Twain follows her, and desperately begs for her pendant so he can reunite with the mermaid. Beaverton reluctantly gives it to him, and Clone Twain walks into the river, his sailer captain hat left floating at the surface. Beaverton spots something in the water and grabs it with a stick. It was a messenger bottle Laffayete had thrown into the river earlier in the story. Beaverton opens the bottle and reads the note. The reader doesn't see what the note reads, but its message makes Beaverton blush as she gazes to the passing ships.

== Serialization ==
The book was originally serialized online from 2010 to 2012, where it received 800,000 unique visitors. Alongside installments of the book, Siegel published a companion blog, where he posted the songs, stories, maps, and other findings that comprised his research. He also hosted discussions with readers and included portraits of some of the comic's fans in the book.

== Critical reception ==
Sailor Twain received positive reviews including starred reviews from Publishers Weekly. Booklist reported,

Siegel's novel of obsessive romance and mythological realism churns through deep pools of humor, passion, and darkness. Studied panoramas of the intricate working of steamboats will steal away whatever breath you have left over from the mermaid's beauty and the story's outright tension as it steers toward a complex, catastrophic climax. Though serialized online, this is a luxurious graphic novel in its print form and is absolutely not to be missed.

A gripping novel with compelling characters, enhanced by haunting, erotically charged drawings.

— John Irving

This extraordinary work of fiction pushes the graphic novel well beyond its previous limits. The narrative takes us on many journeys through space and time, but is more than a mere tale. It's about the past and present, the absolute importance of myth, of language, of stories themselves. In superb words and drawings, it also explores obsession and love in a way that is original to the genre, and to literature itself. In the best sense, the completed work succeeds in a very difficult task: making the reader more human. Bravo!

— Pete Hamill

A romance in the truest sense of the word, Sailor Twain is a marvel of graphical beauty and complex, intelligent storytelling. Siegel creates a misty, magical Hudson river that is somehow realer and truer and more seductive and many fathoms deeper than the real thing.

— Lev Grossman

== Sailor Twain beyond the page ==
- New York Public Library exhibit "Sailor Twain's New York: Secrets & Mysteries of the River Hudson" from October 2012 to April 2013
- Mark Twain House exhibit
- Millbrook Winery released two Sailor Twain Series wines "Rivermaiden" and "Secret of the Hudson" for which Siegel drew the labels
- New York City jewelry designer Allison Hourcade created "The River Opener" pendant, which appears in the story. The pendant is included in her RockLove Jewelry "Anthology Collection" (www.rocklove.com) and was featured in the New York Public Library.
- Designer created stationery for the Lorelei steamboat, based on letterhead designs of 19th century steamboats

== Author cameos in Sailor Twain ==
- Walt Whitman
- Joseph Conrad
- Virginia Woolf
- Emily Dickinson
- John Irving
- Pete Hamill
- Edgar Allan Poe
- Stephen King

== See also ==
- Hudson River
- The Gilded Age
- Hudson River Sloop Clearwater
- Mark Twain's Huckleberry Finn
- Washington Irving
