= Tiera Guinn Fletcher =

American engineer

Tiera Fletcher
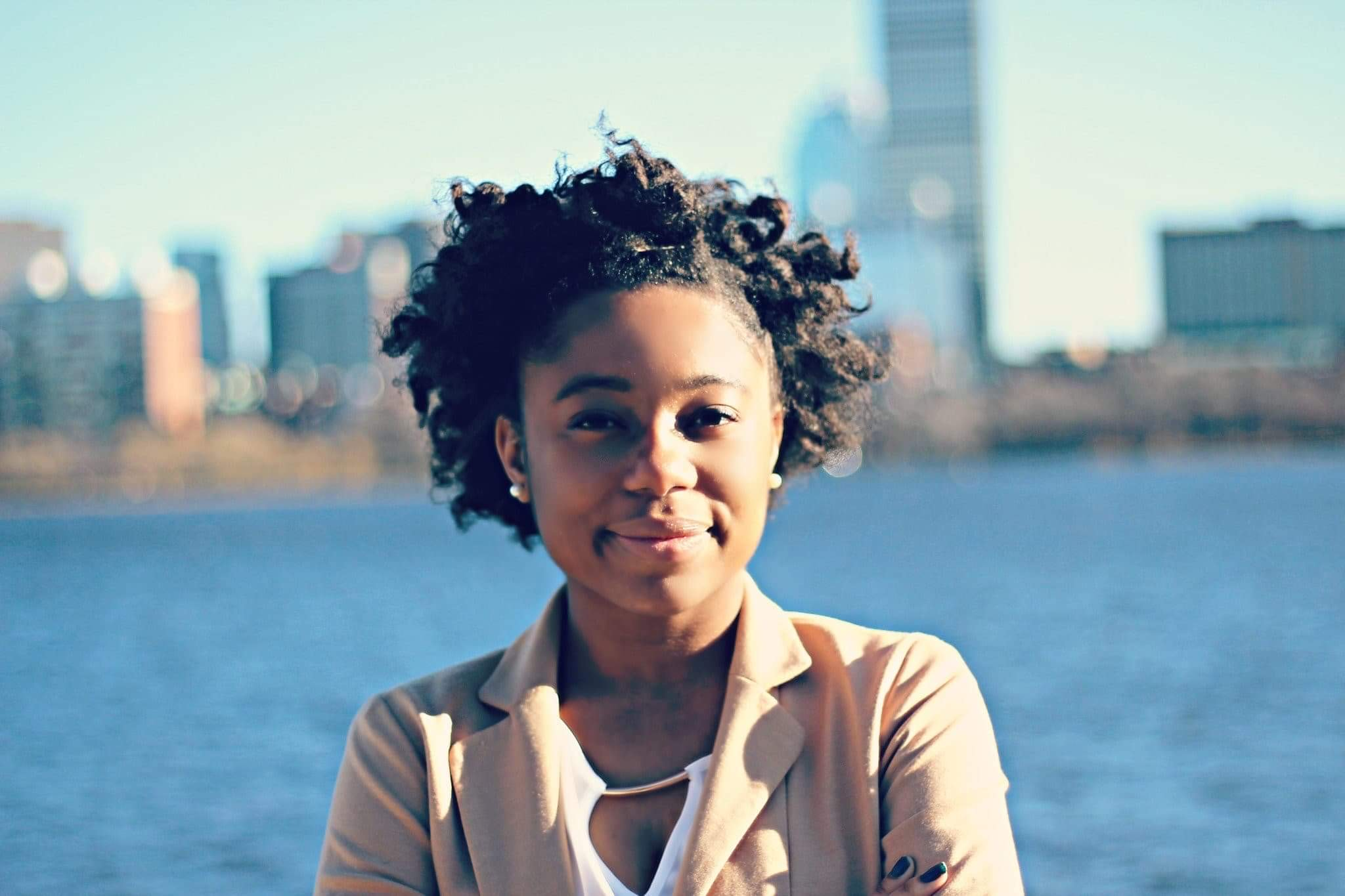
- Born: Atlanta, Georgia
- Education: MIT
- Occupation: Structural analysis engineer
- Notable work: Space Launch System (NASA)

Tiera Guinn Fletcher is an American aerospace engineer. She is a designer and structural analyst for NASA's Space Launch System.

== Early life ==
Tiera Guinn Fletcher was born in the greater Atlanta area in Georgia. Her mother Sheila is an accountant and her father Emery Guinn, Jr, is a construction worker. Her parents encouraged her to calculate things and measure things in her daily life. These exercises, including coupon clipping, totaling up grocery receipts, and learning about the applications of architecture, challenged Fletcher and set her apart from other kids her age. At eleven years old, she zeroed in on her interest in Aerospace engineering while participating in an aerospace program put on by Lockheed Martin.

== Education ==
Fletcher attended Wheeler High School in Marietta, Georgia. During her senior year of high school, Fletcher received an internship at NASA in Langley, Virginia. She also landed a research internship at the Georgia Institute of Technology in 2014. The internship involved assisting in the research of landing performance in aircraft.

Tiera Fletcher attended Massachusetts Institute of Technology (MIT) and received her Bachelor of Science in Aerospace Engineering in June 2017, graduating with a GPA of 5.0 She participated in a mentorship program to help other students at MIT. After her first year, Fletcher participated in undergraduate research studying design optimization of aircraft at MIT. During her junior and senior years of college, Fletcher participated in internships at Boeing. From June 2015 to June 2016 Fletcher was a Systems Engineering Intern at Boeing where she helped design, test, and collaborate with other professionals on Boeing products. The following year from June 2016 to June 2017 Fletcher was a design engineer and stress analyst intern at Boeing, where she helped with the design process and analysis of the Space Launch System for NASA.

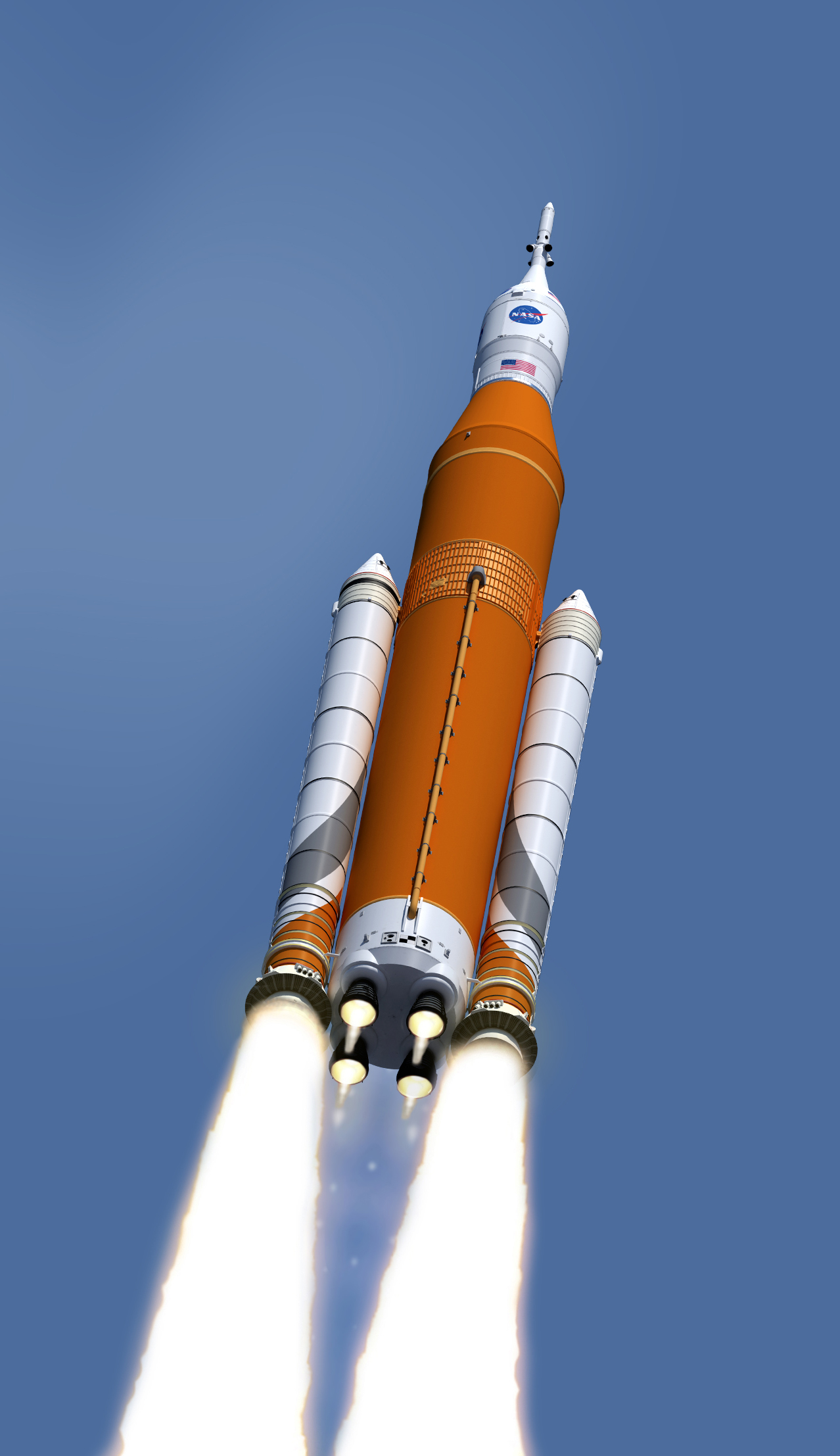
Space Launch System in 2015.

== Career ==
After graduating from MIT, Fletcher took up a position at Boeing as a Structural Analysis Engineer. She is one of the lead engineers and designers working on the Space Launch System for NASA which aims to put humans on Mars. The area that Fletcher works on is the exploratory upper stage of the spacecraft which helps the craft complete its ascent phase. She is part of the Engine Section Task Leading team responsible for this, of which she is the youngest member.

== Recognition and awards ==
Fletcher received the 2017 Good Housekeeping's Awesome Woman Award which recognizes women who are impacting the world for the better by overcoming social constraints and influencing the world around them.

Also in 2017, Fletcher received the Albert G. Hill Prize at MIT which recognizes students in their junior or senior year who have excelled academically and impacted the environment at MIT in a way that improves campus climate for other minorities.

In June 2018, Fletcher participated as a keynote speaker at Impact'18 in Krakow, where speakers discuss innovations and business models to share with the world what work they are doing.

On November 8, 2018, Fletcher won the Most Promising Engineer, Industry Award at the 2019 Black Engineer of the Year Awards.

== Personal life ==
Fletcher was married in July 2017 to Myron Fletcher, an aerospace engineer who also works at Boeing as a pilot. Both she and her husband share an interest in influencing young people to join the world of STEM along with increasing the diversity of STEM fields.
