= José Barreiro =

American writer from New York (born 1948 in Cuba)

Dr. José Barreiro
- Born: 1948 (age 77–78); Jayama, Cuba
- Citizenship: American
- Known for: Native activism
- Spouse: Katsi Cook (St. Regis Mohawk)

José Barreiro (born in Cuba in 1948) is an American novelist, journalist, and activist. He is recognized as an advocate of Native community self-determination and autochthonous development (indigeneity). Barreiro is an elder and advisor in the Nación Taina.

== Early career ==
Barreiro was an early editor and contributor at Akwesasne Notes from 1975 to 1984), working with John Mohawk (Seneca, 1945–2006). At Akwesasne Notes, Barreiro led the human rights group Emergency Response International Network. Later, he and Mohawk founded the Indigenous Peoples Network. Barreiro was an early organizer and communicator in the movement to introduce Western Hemisphere American Indigenous peoples and issues to the United Nations. Based in United States Indian Country in the United States, the communications effort created many channels among Native communities in North, Central, and South America.

Barreiro developed subsequent prominent Indigenous-themed publications and communications projects. Barreiro was an early participant in the international process of Indigenous peoples and a coordinator of the 1977 United Nations Conference that brought together Indigenous peoples of South America and North America, including Central America and the Caribbean.

== Work with Smithsonian Institution ==
Barreiro is a Smithsonian Scholar Emeritus and guides various community projects and publications. He served as assistant director for history and culture research and directed the Office for Latin America, at the Smithsonian National Museum of the American Indian from 2006 to 2017.

Barreiro supported the transformative potential of the creation of the Smithsonian National Museum of the American Indian. His association with NMAI dates to the early 1980s and the museum's incipient years. In 1994, on the occasion of the opening of the George Gustav Heye Center in New York, he worked with the museum to produce Native American Expressive Culture as a special edition of the Akwe:kon Journal. Barreiro's other significant publications include the award-winning novel The Indian Chronicles (1993, republished as Taino, in 2012) and scholarly books and compendiums such as View from the Shore: American Indian Perspectives on the Columbus Quincentenary (1990), Indian Roots of American Democracy (1992), Chiapas: Challenging History (1994), Panchito: Cacique de Montaña (2001); America Is Indian Country (2005), which he edited with Tim Johnson; Thinking in Indian: A John Mohawk Reader (2010) and Taíno: the Indian Chronicles, a novel, (2012); most recently, The Great Inka Road: Engineering an Empire, 2015, and; Dreaming Mother Earth: The Life and Wisdom of Native Cuban Cacique, Francisco "Panchito" Ramirez, Cuban Cacique, 2018.

Barreiro has two current Smithsonian exhibitions active: in New York, Taino: Native Heritage and Identity in the Caribbean (closed in 2019; now a SITES traveling exhibit), and, in Washington, D.C.; The Great Inka Road: Engineering an Empire (open). Both explore survival and continuities of American Indigenous peoples. They both evolved as platform for development and communications initiatives with Cuban Taino-descendant communities and among Quechua communities in Peru.

== Activism ==
In Central and South America, Barreiro advises and advocates for Indigenous communities in Cuba (guajiro-taino), Guatemala (Qʼeqchiʼ Maya) and Peru (Quechua – high mountain). In Cuba and the Caribbean, his work focuses on the recognition for Indigenous people in the Eastern plains and mountains, after centuries of marginalization and quasi-legal, historical dictums of extinction. The initiative brought together Native community leaders with historians, anthropologists, archeologists, botanists, agriculturalists, and others to reassess the historical notion of Native extinction and the obscured realities of surviving populations. An emerging local Native women's leadership and a fuller discussion on the applications of local, natural (organic) agro-ecological knowledge in Cuba, and by extension, other Caribbean countries, where indigeneity is now an organizing factor.

In North America, Barreiro is involved in the application of principles of indigeneity in Native community education and socialization, particularly around the work of healing and strengthening of young people and families. Barreiro: "The emergence of a heartfelt mandate toward family healing processes in Native North American communities is an increasingly detectable movement that couples traditional principles of practice and the most current medical research in the search in developing new approaches and structures for the health of humans and the natural world."

== Work at Cornell University ==
Former professor of Native American Studies at Cornell University. At Cornell, Barreiro was founding editor of Native Americas Journal (1995–2002). In 2003–2006, he redesigned and was Senior editor of Indian Country Today. He is also the editor of Indian Roots of American Democracy (1988), and the Cornell Akwe:kon series that included "Indian Corn of the Americas: Gift to the World," (1988) and "Chiapas: Challenging History," (1994). A book published in Cuba in 2001, the ethnographical testimony Panchito: Mountain Cacique, (Ediciones Catedral, Santiago de Cuba) is the first modern ethnography of a contemporary Taino-Guajiro community, and its leader. Barreiro's first novel, published in 1993 (republished 2012, Fulcrum Publishers) Taino: the Indian Chronicles, is presented as a pseudo-journal of the life of historical Diego Colon, a 12-year-old Taíno whom Christopher Columbus takes with him to Spain in 1493, and who later returns to the Americas, where he supports the Taíno resistance led by Guarocuya. A 2006 book of journalistic essays, America is Indian Country, based on editorials and commentaries from the publication, Indian Country Today, canvasses contemporary issues and personalities in Indian Country. Barreiro most recently edited the book, Thinking in Indian: A John Mohawk Reader, (Fulcrum, 2010).

== Marriage and children ==
Barreiro married Katsi Cook, a St.Regis Mohawk midwife, environmentalist, Native American rights activist, and women's health advocate in the early 1970s. They have five children and eight grandchildren.

== Works ==
Taino: A Novel

== See also ==
- Cuban American literature
- List of Cuban-American writers
