= Carter G. Woodson Book Award =

Literary award for ethnicity depiction to young readers

The Carter G. Woodson Book Award is an American literary award created in 1973 by the Racism and Social Justice Committee of the National Council for the Social Studies to promote cultural literacy in children and young adults.

First presented in 1974, the award is named for American historian, author, and journalist Carter G. Woodson. Currently awarded at three levels – elementary, middle, and secondary – middle was added in 2001 after the other two divisions began in 1989.

In addition to announcing winners, the award recognizes honor books, referred to from 1980 to 1996 as those having "outstanding merit". An accompanying seal, with a likeness of Woodson, was introduced in 1999 with gold seals applied to winning book covers and silver seals on honor books.

As of 2024, Brent Ashabranner is the only author whose books have received the award three times, as well as the only to have winning books two years in a row. Don Tate, who first had a book win the Woodson award in 2016, illustrated a second title that also (uniquely) won that year.

== Award recipients ==
General winners (1974–1988)
Year	Author	Title	Subject	Ref.
1974	Eloise Greenfield	Rosa Parks	Rosa Parks	
1975	Jesse C. Jackson	Make a Joyful Noise Unto the Lord: The Life of Mahalia Jackson, Queen of the Gospel Singers	Mahalia Jackson	
1976	Laurence Yep	Dragonwings	Chinese Americans	
1977	Dorothy Sterling	The Trouble They Seen	African Americans	
1978	Jane Goodsell	The Biography of Daniel Inouye	Daniel Inouye	
1979	Peter Nabokov	Native American Testimony: An Anthology of Indian and White Relations	Native Americans	
1980	Nancy Wood	War Cry on a Prayer Feather: Prose and Poetry of the Ute	Ute people	
1981	Milton Meltzer	The Chinese Americans	Chinese Americans	
1982	Susan Carver and Paula McGuire	Coming to North America from Mexico, Cuba and Puerto Rico	Immigration to the U.S.	
1983	Brent Ashabranner	Morning Star, Black Sun	Northern Cheyenne tribe	
1984	E.B. Fincher	Mexico and the United States	Mexico–U.S. relations	
1985	Brent Ashabranner	To Live in Two Worlds: American Indian Youth Today	Native Americans	
1986	Brent Ashabranner	Dark Harvest: Migrant Farmworkers in America	Migrant workers	
1987	Arlene Hirschfelder	Happily May I Walk	Native Americans	
1988	James Haskins	Black Music in America: A History Through Its People	African-American music	

Secondary level winners (grades 7–12, since 1989)
Year	Author	Title	Subject	Ref.
1989	Charles Patterson	Marian Anderson	Marian Anderson	
1990	Rebecca Larsen	Paul Robeson	Paul Robeson	
1991	Mary E. Lyons	Sorrow's Kitchen: The Life and Folklore of Zora Neale Hurston	Zora Neale Hurston	
1992	Jeri Ferris	Native American Doctor: The Story of Susan LaFlesche Picotte	Susan LaFlesche Picotte	
1993	Mildred Pitts Walter	Mississippi Challenge	African Americans in Mississippi	
1994	James Haskins	The March on Washington	March on Washington	
1995	Zak Mettger	Till Victory is Won: Black Soldiers in the Civil War	African Americans in the Civil War	
1996	Ellen Levine	A Fence Away from Freedom: Japanese Americans and World War II	Internment of Japanese Americans	
1997	James Haskins	The Harlem Renaissance	Harlem Renaissance	
1998	Milton Meltzer	Langston Hughes	Langston Hughes	
1999	Rinna Evelyn Wolfe	Edmonia Lewis: Wildfire in Marble	Edmonia Lewis	
2000	Sharon Linnea	Princess Ka'iulani: Hope of a Nation, Heart of a People	Kaʻiulani	
2001	Albert Marrin	Tatan'ka Iyota'ke: Sitting Bull and His World	Sitting Bull	
2002	Barbara C. Cruz	Multiethnic Teens and Cultural Identity	Multiracial people	
2003	Harvey Fireside	The "Mississippi Burning" Civil Rights Murder Conspiracy Trial: a Headline Court Case	Murders of Chaney, Goodman, and Schwerner	
2004	James Tackach	Early Black Reformers	African-American history	
2005	Robert H. Mayer (editor)	The Civil Rights Act of 1964	Civil Rights Act of 1964	
2006	Calvin Craig Miller	No Easy Answers: Bayard Rustin and the Civil Rights Movement	Bayard Rustin	
2007	Joanne Oppenheim	Dear Miss Breed: True Stories of the Japanese-American Incarceration During World War II and a Librarian Who Made a Difference	Internment of Japanese Americans	
2008	Vincent Collin Beach with Anni Beach	Don't Throw Away Your Stick Till You Cross the River: The Journey of an Ordinary Man	Race and ethnicity in the U.S.	
2009	Francisco Jiménez	Reaching Out	Immigration to the U.S.	
2010	Ann Bausum	Denied, Detained, Deported: Stories From the Dark Side of American Immigration	Immigration to the U.S.	
2011	Elaine M. Alphin	An Unspeakable Crime: The Prosecution and Persecution of Leo Frank	Leo Frank	
2012	Larry Dane Brimner	Black and White: The Confrontation between Reverend Fred L. Shuttlesworth and Eugene "Bull" Connor	Fred Shuttlesworth and Bull Connor	
2013	Judith Fradin and Dennis Fradin	Stolen into Slavery the True Story of Solomon Northup, Free Black Man	Solomon Northup	
2014	no award presented			
2015	Steve Sheinkin	The Port Chicago 50: Disaster, Mutiny, and the Fight for Civil Rights	Port Chicago disaster	
2016	Winifred Conkling	Passenger on the Pearl: The True Story of Emily Edmonson's Flight from Slavery	Emily Edmonson	
2017	John Lewis, Andrew Aydin, and Nate Powell	March (Trilogy)	Civil rights movement	
2018	Larry Dane Brimner	Twelve Days in May—Freedom Ride 1961	Freedom Riders	
2019	Claire Hartfield	A Few Red Drops	Chicago race riot of 1919	
2020	Ashley Bryan	Infinite Hope: A Black Artist's Journey from World War II to Peace	African Americans in World War II	
2021	Evette Dionne	Lifting as We Climb: Black Women's Battle for the Ballot Box	Black Suffrage in the U.S.	
2022	Sandra Neil Wallace and Rich Wallace	Race Against Time	Scipio Jones and the Elaine 12	
2023	Lawrence Goldstone	Days of Infamy: How a Century of Bigotry Led to Japanese American Internment	Internment of Japanese Americans	
2024	Thien Pham	Family Style: Memories of an American from Vietnam	Vietnamese Americans	
2025	Dan SaSuWeh Jones	Stealing Little Moon: The Legacy of the American Indian Boarding Schools	American Indian boarding schools and cultural assimilation	

Middle level winners (grades 5–8, since 2001)
Year	Author	Title	Subject	Ref.
2001	Andrea Davis Pinkney	Let it Shine: Stories of Black Women Freedom Fighters	Abolitionism in the United States, and the Civil rights movement	
2002	Alice Hinkel	Prince Estabrook: Slave and Soldier	Prince Estabrook	
2003	Michael L. Cooper	Remembering Manzanar: Life in a Japanese Relocation Camp	Manzanar	
2004	Kimberly Komatsu and Kaleigh Komatsu	In America's Shadow	Internment of Japanese Americans	
2005	Russell Freedman	The Voice that Challenged a Nation: Marian Anderson and the Struggle for Equal Rights	Marian Anderson	
2006	Bárbara Cruz	César Chávez: A Voice for Farmworkers	Cesar Chávez	
2007	Russell Freedman	Freedom Walkers: The Story of the Montgomery Bus Boycott	Montgomery bus boycott	
2008	John Fleischman	Black and White Airmen: Their True History	Racial segregation in the U.S. military	
2009	James Haskins and Kathleen Benson with Virginia Schomp	Drama of African-American History: The Rise of Jim Crow	Jim Crow laws	
2010	Phillip Hoose	Claudette Colvin: Twice Toward Justice	Claudette Colvin	
2011	no award presented			
2012	Susan Goldman Rubin	Music Was It: Young Leonard Bernstein	Leonard Bernstein	
2013	Ann Bausum	Marching to the Mountaintop: How Poverty, Labor Fights, and Civil Rights Set the Stage for Martin Luther King, Jr.'s Final Hours	Martin Luther King Jr.	
2014	Tonya Bolden	Emancipation Proclamation: Lincoln and the Dawn of Liberty	Emancipation Proclamation	
2015	Teri Kanefield	The Girl from the Tar Paper School: Barbara Rose Johns and the Advent of the Civil Rights Movement	Barbara Rose Johns	
2016	no award presented			
2017	no award presented			
2018	Laura Atkins and Stan Yogi	Fighting for Justice—Fred Korematsu Speaks Up	Fred Korematsu	
2019	Wendy Ewald	America Border Culture Dreamer: The Young Immigrant Experience From A to Z	Immigration to the United States	
2020	Ashley Bryan	Infinite Hope: A Black Artist's Journey from World War II to Peace	Racial segregation in the U.S. military, World War II	
2021	James Otis Smith	Black Heroes of the Wild West	Mary Fields, Bass Reeves, and Bob Lemmons	
2022	Carole Boston Weatherford	Unspeakable: The Tulsa Race Massacre	Tulsa race massacre	
2023	Candacy Taylor	Overground Railroad: The Green Book and The Roots of Black Travel in America (The Young Adult Adaptation)	The Negro Motorist Green Book	
2024	Traci Sorell	Contenders: Two Native Baseball Players, One World Series	Chief Bender and Chief Meyers	
2025	Carole Boston Weatherford	The Doll Test: Choosing Equality	School segregation and self-esteem	

Elementary level winners (grades K–6, since 1989)
Year	Author	Title	Subject	Ref.
1989	Jeri Ferris	Walking the Road to Freedom	Sojourner Truth	
1990	Aylette Jenness and Alice Rivers	In Two Worlds: A Yup’ik Eskimo Family	Yupik peoples	
1991	Catherine Scheader	Shirley Chisolm	Shirley Chisolm	
1992	Fay Stanley	The Last Princess: The Story of Princess Ka’iulani of Hawai’i	Kaʻiulani	
1993	Patricia and Fredrick McKissack	Madam C.J. Walker	Madam C. J. Walker	
1994	Mary E. Lyons	Starting Home: The Story of Horace Pippin, Painter	Horace Pippin	
1995	Jeri Ferris	What I Had Was Singing: The Story of Marian Anderson	Marian Anderson	
1996	Monty Roessel	Songs from the Loom: A Navajo Girl Learns to Weave	Navajo weaving	
1997	Suhaib Hamid Ghazi	Ramadan	Ramadan	
1998	Leon Walter Tillage	Leon's Story	Leon Walter Tillage	
1999	John Duggleby	Story Painter: The Life of Jacob Lawrence	Jacob Lawrence	
2000	Ruby Bridges	Through My Eyes	Ruby Bridges	
2001	Carole Boston Weatherford	The Sound that Jazz Makes	African-American music	
2002	Nanette Mellage	Coming Home: A Story of Josh Gibson, Baseball's Greatest Home Run Hitter	Josh Gibson	
2003	Richard Griswold del Castillo	Cesar Chavez: The Struggle for Justice / Cesar Chavez: La lucha por la justicia	Cesar Chavez	
2004	Liselotte Erdrich	Sacagawea	Sacagawea	
2005	Joseph Bruchac	Jim Thorpe's Bright Path	Jim Thorpe	
2006	Margot Theis Raven	Let Them Play	Civil rights movement and Little League Baseball	
2007	Jim Haskins and Kathleen Benson	John Lewis in the Lead: A Story of the Civil Rights Movement	John Lewis	
2008	Bill Wise	Louis Sockalexis: Native American Baseball Pioneer	Louis Sockalexis	
2009	Nikki Giovanni	Lincoln and Douglass: An American Friendship	Abraham Lincoln and Stephen A. Douglas	
2010	Paula Yoo	Shining Star: The Anna May Wong Story	Anna May Wong	
2011	Andrea Davis Pinkney	Sit In: How Four Friends Stood Up By Sitting Down	Greensboro sit-ins	
2012	Gina Capaldi and Q. L. Pearce	Red Bird Sings: The Story of Zitkala-Ša, Native American Author, Musician, and Activist (adapted)	Zitkala-Ša	
2013	Jabari Asim	Fifty Cents and a Dream: Young Booker T. Washington	Booker T. Washington	
2014	Anne Rockwell	Hey Charleston!: The True Story of the Jenkins Orphanage Band	Jenkins Orphanage	
2015	Duncan Tonatiuh	Separate Is Never Equal: Sylvia Mendez and Her Family's Fight for Desegregation	Sylvia Mendez	
2016	Don Tate	Poet: The Remarkable Story of George Moses Horton	George Moses Horton	
2016	Chris Barton	The Amazing Age of John Roy Lynch	John R. Lynch	
2017	Annette Bay Pimentel	Mountain Chef: How One Man Lost His Groceries, Changed His Plans, and Helped Cook Up the National Park Service	Tie Sing	
2018	Cynthia Levinson	The Youngest Marcher—The Story of Audrey Faye Hendricks, a Young Civil Rights Activist	Audrey Faye Hendricks	
2019	Mélina Mangal	The Vast Wonder of the World: Biologist Ernest Everett Just	Ernest Everett Just	
2020	Kwame Alexander	The Undefeated	African Americans	
2021	Don Tate	William Still and His Freedom Stories	William Still	
2022	Martha Brockenbrough and Grace Lin	I Am an American: The Wong Kim Ark Story	United States v. Wong Kim Ark	
2023	Diane Wilson, Sun Yung Shin, Shannon Gibney, and John Coy	Where We Come From	Cultural heritage	
2024	Carole Lindstrom	My Powerful Hair	Long hair, indigenous peoples, and racism	
2025	Kao Kalia Yang	The Rock in My Throat	Linguistic discrimination	
