= Evette Dionne =

American culture writer

- Education: Bennett College (BA); Southern Illinois University Carbondale (MA)
- Occupations: Writer, editor
- Writing career
- Language: English
- Subjects: African-American history, feminism, pop culture
- Notable work: Lifting As We Climb (2020)
- Website: evettedionne.com

Evette Dionne is an American culture writer. Her young adult debut Lifting As We Climb (Viking) was longlisted for the 2020 National Book Award for Young People's Literature. Dionne was editor-in-chief of Bitch from 2018 until 2021.

== Early life and education ==
Dionne was raised in New York. She initially matriculated at University of Maryland Eastern Shore and later transferred to the HBCU Bennett College, where she received her bachelor's degree in 2012. She later received her master’s degree in media management and women, gender, and sexuality studies from Southern Illinois University Carbondale.

== Career ==
Dionne is a culture writer whose work centers Black feminism and current events. She has published her writing in Teen Vogue, the New York Times, and Harper's Bazaar among others. Dionne was previously a senior news editor at The Revelist and Clutch Magazine. She was named editor-in-chief of Bitch in 2018 and held the position until September 2021. Issue #92 was the final issue of Bitch she produced during her tenure.

Her commentary has been cited in several outlets on topics such as Toni Morrison, Kobe Bryant's legacy, and gynecological health. She is a contributing writer to the books Burn It Down (2019) and Can We All Be Feminists?: New Writing From Brit Bennett, Nicole Dennis-Benn, and 15 Others On Intersectionality, Identity, and the Way Forward for Feminism (2018). Dionne's tweets have been cited by AJC and NBCNews.com.

In 2021, Dionne was recruited to Netflix to develop editorial strategy and manage a team of staffers for a new initiative, Tudum. Seven months later, she and her team were among the 150 laid off.

Dionne co-founded the feminist media co-op The Flytrap in October 2024.

=== Books ===
Dionne published her first book, Fat Girls Deserve Fairy Tales Too: Living Hopefully On the Other Side of Skinny, in 2019 under Seal Press.

Her first middle grade book, Lifting As We Climb: Black Women’s Battle for the Ballot Box, was published by Viking Books and released on April 21, 2020. Dionne was inspired to write the book in 2016 when she noticed women visiting to the graves of various white female suffragettes like Elizabeth Cady Stanton in the lead-up to the presidential election. She wanted to highlight the contributions of Black women in earning the right to vote. It was written for a middle grade audience. The book received positive critical reception. In a starred review for the School Library Journal, Susan Catlett called it a "must-purchase." Kirkus Reviews referred to the book as "a lively and critical addition as the United States commemorates the centennial of women’s suffrage."

Dionne's memoir, Weightless: Making Space for My Resilient Body and Soul was released by Ecco Press in December, 2022.

== Works ==
- Fat Girls Deserve Fairy Tales Too (2019, Seal Press; ISBN 9781580059268)
- Lifting As We Climb (2020, Viking; ISBN 978-0-451-48154-2)

== Awards ==
For Lifting As We Climb:

- 2020 – National Book Award for Young People's Literature, Longlist
- 2021 – Orbis Pictus Award, Honor
- 2021 – ALA, Coretta Scott King Book Award, Honor
- 2021 – National Council for the Social Studies, Carter G. Woodson Book Award, Winner (Secondary Level)
