= James Haskins =

American author (1941–2005)

- Born: September 19, 1941; Demopolis, Alabama, U.S.
- Died: July 6, 2005 (aged 63); U.S.
- Education: Georgetown University (BA) [Alabama State (BS); University of New Mexico (MA)
- Occupation: Nonfiction writer
- Writing career
- Genres: Biography, Children's literature, Young adult fiction
- Notable works: The Story of Stevie Wonder; Lena Horne; Count Your Way series

James Haskins (September 19, 1941 – July 6, 2005) was an American author with more than 100 books for both adults and children. Many of his books highlight the achievements of African Americans and cover the history and culture of Africa and the African American experience. His work also included many biographical subjects, ranging from Lena Horne and Hank Aaron to Scatman Crothers and Malcolm X. Most of his writings were for young people. He wrote on a great variety of subjects that introduced young people to the language and cultures of other continents, especially Africa.

== Biography ==
Haskins was born in Demopolis, Alabama and spent his childhood in a household with many children. He received his high school education in Boston, Massachusetts. He received a B.A. degree from Georgetown University in 1960, a B.S. degree from Alabama State University in 1962, and a M.A. degree from the University of New Mexico in 1963.

After graduation, before he decided to become a teacher, Haskins moved to New York City and worked as a stock trader on Wall Street. He taught music and special education classes in Harlem. His first book, Diary of a Harlem Schoolteacher, was a result of his experience. He was a professor of English at the University of Florida and lived in New York City.

Haskins died in 2005 of complications from emphysema.

== Early life ==
Haskins is an Alabama Native who was born in the year of 1941 he grew up in a loving community with his aunts and uncles. Haskins's hometown is Demopolis, Alabama growing up he experienced segregation in the public school system. Haskins would have to make the best out of what he could with scarce academic and financial resources. Haskins's family would buy supermarket encyclopedias to help him quench his thirst for knowledge. His parents' white boss would allow Haskins to use her library card to supply his need for learning to read, when Haskins turned twelve years old his mother and he relocated to Boston, Massachusetts many of his teachers were Harvard professors. This school was prestigious and Haskins was one of twenty-five African American students that attended this school. Haskins developed his love for teaching in Boston, he also played the trumpet and had a passion for music as well. Haskins obtained his education from many different institutions across the country from Alabama, Boston, Washington D.C., and New Mexico. During his time in Alabama Haskins attended school at Alabama State University around the period of 1959-1960. It was here where Haskins would begin to develop his liking for social activism. Haskins would participate in sit-in demonstrations to protest for African-American rights. Later Haskins would assist Rosa Parks by helping her publish her book with him as the co-author. He also has recordings from his interview with Rosa Parks he and his fellow peers would be labeled as rabble-rousers for trying to sit in the white-only section of the lunch rooms. Haskins and others would be expelled for their actions. He would end up leaving ASU because he was granted a scholarship to Georgetown after obtaining a bachelor's degree in psychology he would return to Alabama to complete yet another bachelor's degree this time in the arts of history. Once he completed that he would go off to the University of New Mexico to complete his master's in social psychology.

== Later years ==
Haskins would later spend time in the state of New York he became a stock trader which was something he did not enjoy. He later would turn his talents to teaching in the borough of Harlem he kept a diary of his encounters as a teacher and would later go on to publish it. It was titled, "Diary of A Harlem School Teacher". When Haskins decided to leave Harlem he would become a professor at Staten Island Community College. Seven years had passed and around this time Jim had decided to teach at the University of Florida as an English professor. Haskins always preferred to be labeled a teacher over being labeled a writer, Haskins would achieve several literary awards for his novels.

== Writing ==
Haskins' picture books, with many brightly colored pictures and few words, were geared to young children just learning to read. They tend to highlight the achievements of African Americans in society. The characters in his stories cover the gamut of African American role models, from Rosa Parks to the black members of the Hannibal Guards, a military organization in Pittsburgh during the Civil War.

Haskins' 1977 picture book The Cotton Club, featuring gangsters, jilted love, and pre-prohibition gangsters, was used as inspiration for the 1984 film of the same name.

In 1998, his young adult book African American Entrepreneurs was published by Jossey-Bass in English. The book followed the success of his first work, Voodoo and Hoodoo: The Craft as Revealed by Traditional Practitioners, published some 20 years prior.

== Awards ==
Several of Haskins' books were Coretta Scott King Author Honor titles, including Barbara Jordan, Lena Horne, and Black Dance in America. He won the Coretta Scott King Award for The Story of Stevie Wonder in 1977. Bricktop was chosen by the English-Speaking Union to be a Book-Across-the-Sea in 1983. Black Music in America won the 1988 Carter G. Woodson Book Award of the National Council for the Social Studies. He would go on to win the award four more times. His four-book Count Your Way series (Arab World, China, Japan, and Russia) won the Alabama Library Association Award for best work for children in 1988. In 1994, he was presented the Washington Post Children's Book Guide Award.

== Selected bibliography ==
- Diary of a Harlem Schoolteacher (Grove Press, 1969)
- Profiles in Black Power (1972)
- Pinckney Benton Stewart Pinchback (Macmillan Publishing, 1973)
- The Story of Stevie Wonder (1975)
- Pele: A Biography (1976)
- Scott Joplin: The Man Who Made Ragtime (1978)
- Voodoo and Hoodoo: The Craft as Revealed by Traditional Practitioners (1978)
- James Van DerZee: The Picture Takin' Man (1980)
- Bricktop (1983)
- Lena Horne (1983)
- Black Music in America: A History Through Its People (1987)
- Count Your Way series (1987)
- Mr. Bojangles: The Biography of Bill Robinson (Morrow, 1988)
- I Have a Dream: The Life and Works of Martin Luther King, Jr. (1992)
- One More River to Cross: The Stories of Twelve Black Americans (Scholastic Corporation, 1992)
- The March on Washington (1994)
- From Afar to Zulu: A Dictionary of African Cultures (with Joanna Biondi) (1995)
- African American Entrepreneurs (Jossey-Bass, 1998)
- Black Stars: African American Military Heroes (1998)
- Great Ghost Stories (Morrow, 1998) (Compiled by Peter Glassman, Illustrated by Barry Moser)
- Rosa Parks: My Story (with Rosa Parks) (1999)
- Conjure Times: Black Magicians in America (with Kathleen Benson) (2001)
