= Coronado Lodge =

- U.S. National Register of Historic Places
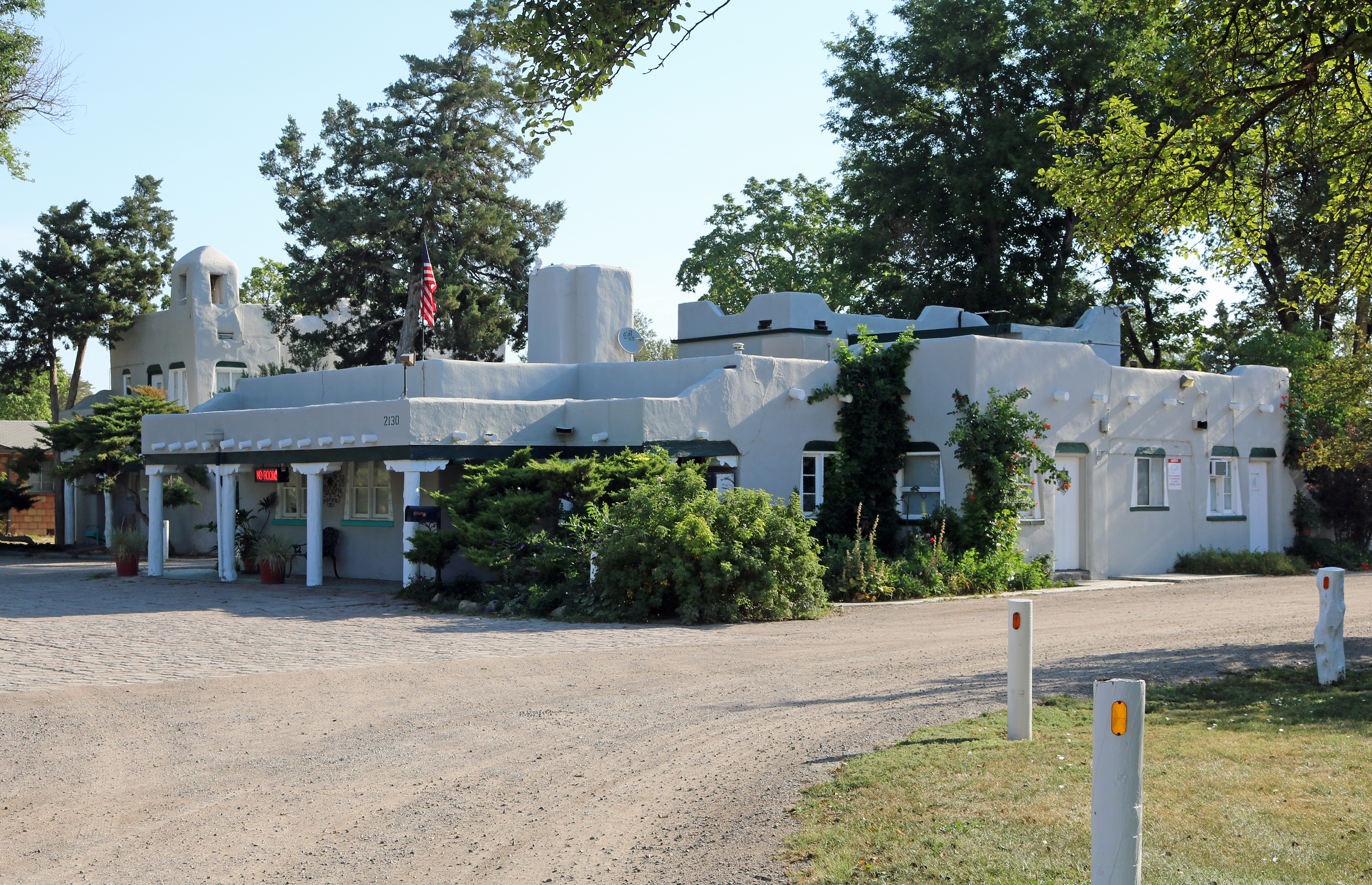

- Location within Colorado
- Location: 2130 Lake Ave., Pueblo, Colorado
- Coordinates: 38.2304°N 104.6248°W
- Area: 1.7 acres (0.69 ha)
- Built: c.1940-41
- Architectural style: Pueblo Revival
- NRHP reference No.: 100005146
- Added to NRHP: March 30, 2020

The Coronado Lodge, at 2130 Lake Ave. in Pueblo, Colorado, was listed on the National Register of Historic Places in 2020.

It was built "ca. 1940-41 by Ralph and Anna Ferris, the Coronado Lodge was part of a national boom in motel construction between 1940 and 1960 that reflected the nation’s growing automobile-based mobility and increased disposable income for leisure travel in the years following World War II. The Coronado Lodge is important for many reasons, most strikingly for its association with the history of African American travel and tourism during the era of segregation."

It was deemed "an excellent example of Pueblo Revival-style mid-century motel architecture. The Pueblo Revival style produced an eye-catching appearance that appealed to travelers by evoking the history and romance of the Southwest. The style is particularly appropriate for Pueblo, which historically has had a large Hispano population with ties to New Mexico. The Coronado Lodge displays several distinguishing characteristics of the Pueblo Revival style including stepped massing, flat roofs with parapets, stuccoed adobe and concrete block walls, projecting vigas, portales with corbelled brackets, and flat-headed windows."

"The Coronado Lodge is also significant for its association with the history of African American travel and tourism during the era of segregation. The motel offered accommodations to African American travelers since at least 1946 and advertised from 1957 to 1967 in The Negro Travelers’ Green Book, publication historian Gretchen Sullivan Sorin described as “the bible of every Negro highway traveler in the 1950s and early 1960s.” Most Colorado Green Book lodging facilities were small “tourist homes” in existing residences. The Coronado in 1957 became the second Colorado motel to be listed in The Green Book under owners Arthur H. and Hattie L. Copley and remained one of only three motels listed in it through 1967. The facility was integrated, welcoming both whites and guests of color prior to the passage of the 1964 Civil Rights Act."

SIGNIFICANCE: Ethnic Heritage/Black, Architecture
