= The Negro Motorist Green Book =

Guidebook for African-American roadtrippers

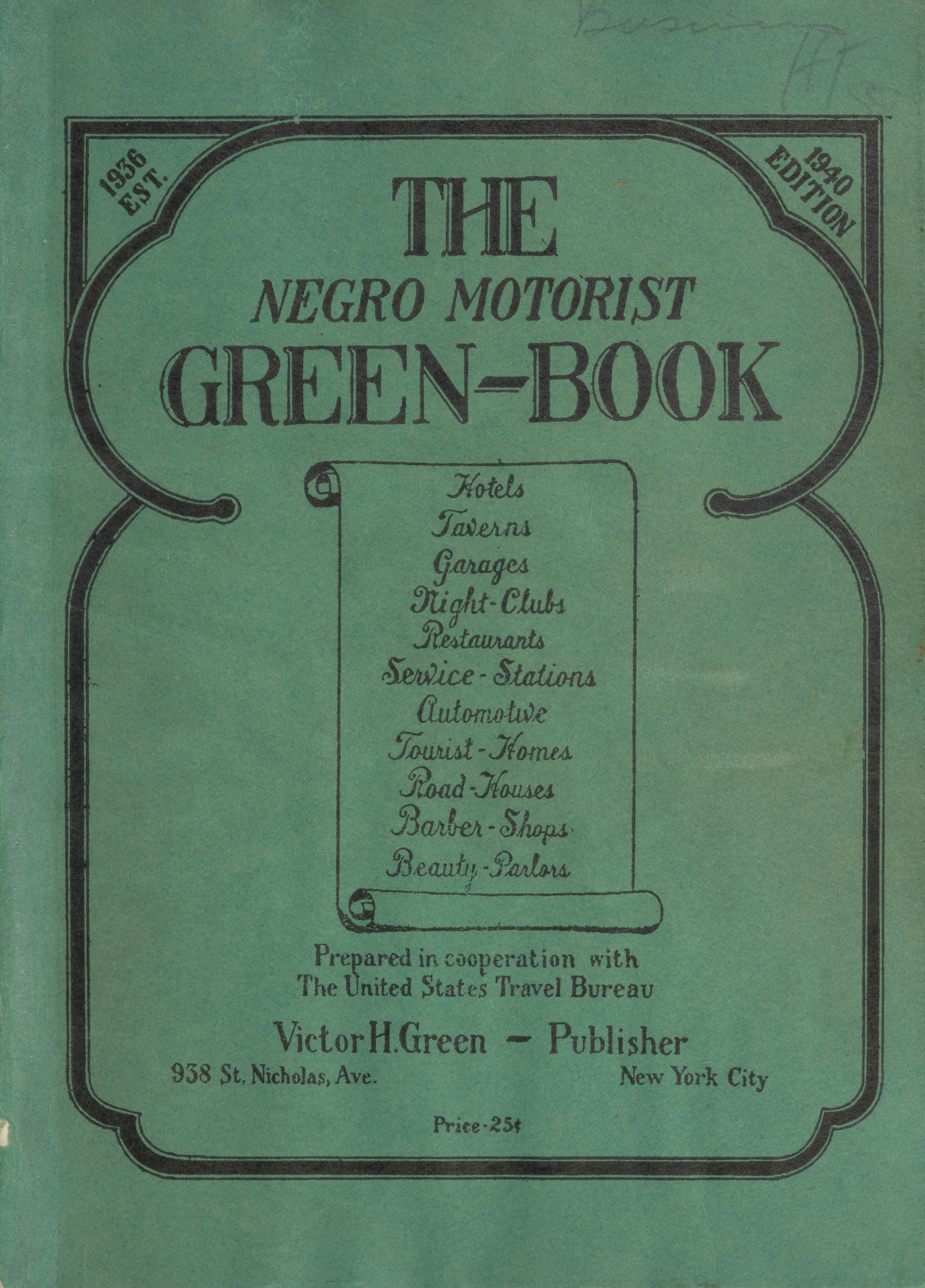
- Cover of the 1940 edition
- Author: Victor Hugo Green
- Country: United States
- Language: English
- Genre: Guide book
- Publisher: Victor Hugo Green
- Published: 1936–1966

The Negro Motorist Green Book (also, The Negro Travelers' Green Book, or Green-Book) was a guidebook for African American roadtrippers. It was founded by Victor Hugo Green, an African American postal worker from New York City, and was published annually from 1936 to 1966. This was during the era of Jim Crow laws, when open and often legally prescribed discrimination against African Americans especially and other non-whites was widespread. While pervasive racial discrimination and poverty limited black car ownership, the emerging African American middle class bought automobiles as soon as they could but faced a variety of dangers and inconveniences along the road, from refusal of food and lodging to arbitrary arrest. In the South, where Black motorists risked harassment or physical violence, these dangers were particularly severe. In some cases, African American travelers who got lost or sought lodging off the beaten path were killed, with little to no investigation by local authorities. In response, Green wrote his guide to services and places relatively friendly to African Americans. Eventually, he also founded a travel agency.

Many black Americans took to driving, in part to avoid segregation on public transportation. As the writer George Schuyler put it in 1930, "all Negroes who can do so purchase an automobile as soon as possible in order to be free of discomfort, discrimination, segregation and insult". Black Americans employed as athletes, entertainers, and salesmen also traveled frequently for work purposes using automobiles that they owned personally.

African American travelers faced discrimination, such as white-owned businesses refusing to serve them or repair their vehicles, being refused accommodation or food by white-owned hotels, and threats of physical violence and forcible expulsion from whites-only "sundown towns". Green founded and published the Green Book to avoid such problems, compiling resources "to give the Negro traveler information that will keep him from running into difficulties, embarrassments and to make his trip more enjoyable". The maker of a 2019 documentary film about the book offered this summary: "Everyone I was interviewing talked about the community that the Green Book created: a kind of parallel universe that was created by the book and this kind of secret road map that the Green Book outlined".

From a New York-focused first edition published in 1936, Green expanded the work to cover much of North America, including most of the United States and parts of Canada, Mexico, the Caribbean, and Bermuda. The Green Book became "the bible of black travel during Jim Crow", enabling black travelers to find lodgings, businesses, and gas stations that would serve them along the road. It was little known outside the African American community. Shortly after the passage of the Civil Rights Act of 1964, which outlawed the types of racial discrimination that had made the Green Book necessary, publication ceased and it fell into obscurity. There has been a revived interest in it in the early 21st century in connection with studies of black travel during the Jim Crow era.

Four issues (1940, 1947, 1954, and 1963) have been republished in facsimile (as of December 2017) and have sold well. Twenty-three additional issues have now been digitized by the New York Public Library Digital Collections.

== African American travel experiences ==
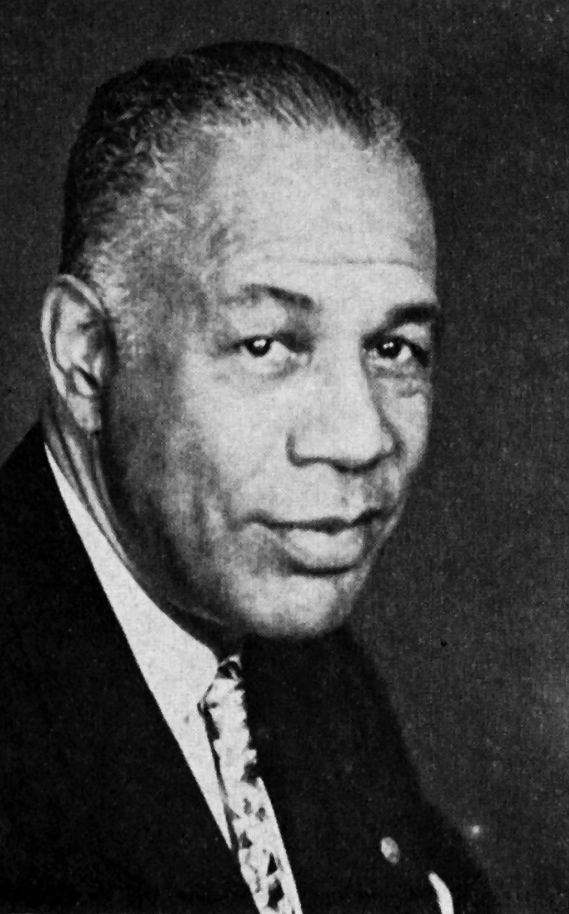
Victor Hugo Green in 1956

Before the legislative accomplishments of the civil rights movement, car journeys for black people were fraught with difficulty and potential danger. They were subjected to racial profiling by police departments ("driving while black") and sometimes seen as "uppity" or "too prosperous" just for the act of driving, which many whites regarded as a white prerogative. They risked harassment or worse on and off the highway. A bitter commentary published in a 1947 issue of the NAACP's official magazine, The Crisis, highlighted the uphill struggle black people faced in recreational travel:

Would a Negro like to pursue a little happiness at a theater, a beach, pool, hotel, restaurant, on a train, plane, or ship, a golf course, summer or winter resort? Would he like to stop overnight at a tourist camp while he motors about his native land 'Seeing America First'? Well, just let him try!

Thousands of communities in the US had enacted Jim Crow laws that existed after 1890; in such sundown towns, African Americans were in danger if they stayed past sunset. Such restrictions dated back to colonial times and were found throughout the United States. After the end of legal slavery in the North and later in the South after the Civil War, most freedmen continued to live at little more than a subsistence level, but a minority of African Americans gained a measure of prosperity. They could plan leisure travel for the first time. Well-to-do black people arranged large group excursions for as many as 2,000 people at a time, for instance traveling by rail from New Orleans to resorts along the coast of the Gulf of Mexico. In the pre-Jim Crow era, this necessarily meant mingling with whites in hotels, transportation, and leisure facilities. They were aided in this by the Civil Rights Act of 1875, which had made it illegal to discriminate against African Americans in public accommodations and public transportation.

They encountered a white backlash, particularly in the South, where by 1877 white Democrats controlled every state government. The Act was declared unconstitutional by the Supreme Court of the United States in 1883, resulting in states and cities passing numerous segregation laws. White governments in the South required even interstate railroads to enforce their segregation laws, despite national legislation requiring equal treatment of passengers. The Supreme Court of the United States ruled in Plessy v. Ferguson (1896) that "separate but equal" accommodations were constitutional, but in practice, facilities for black people were far from equal, generally being of lesser quality and underfunded. Blacks faced restrictions and exclusion throughout the United States: if not barred entirely from facilities, they could use them only at different times from whites or in (usually inferior) "colored sections".

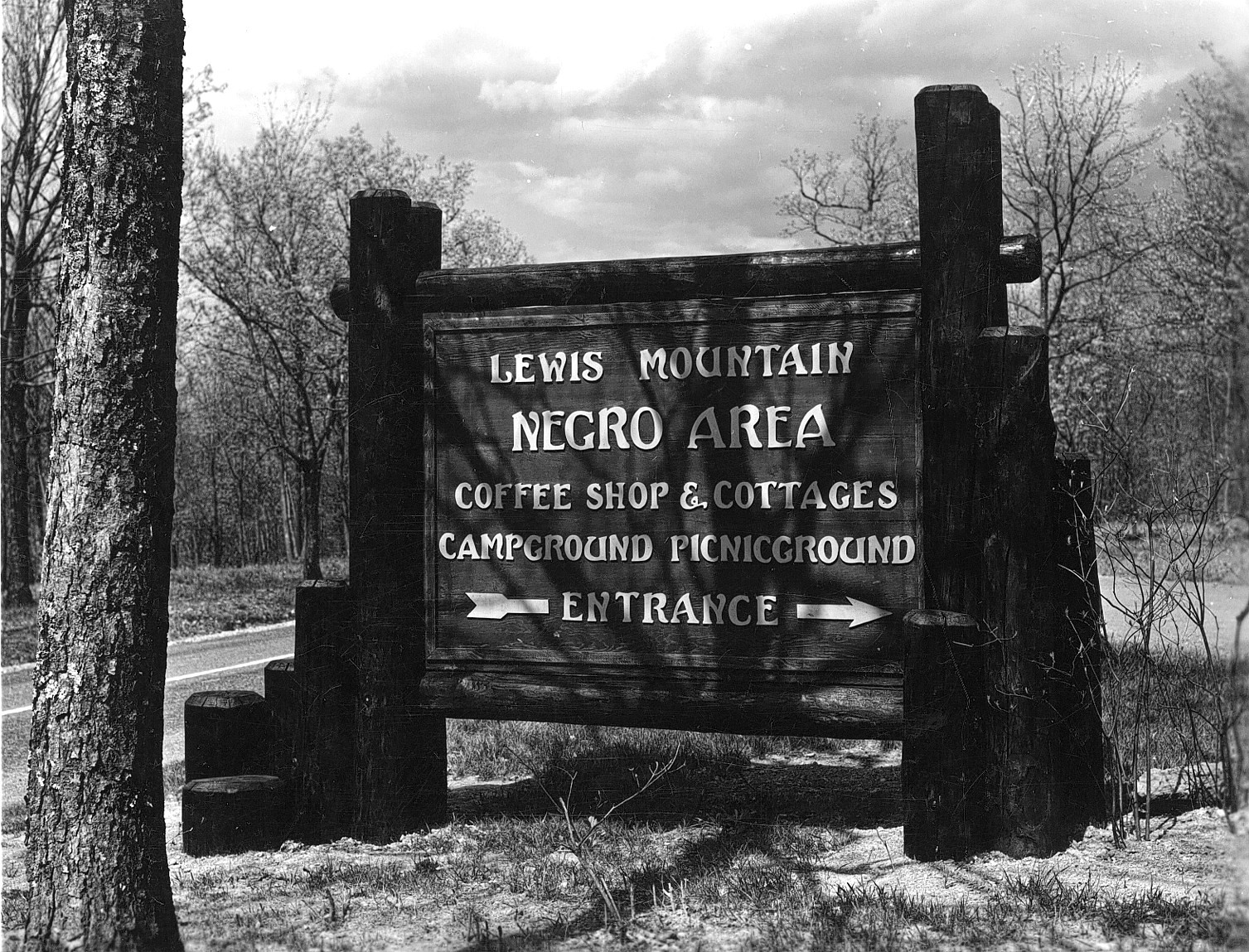
"Separate but equal" in practice: a separate "Negro Area" at Lewis Mountain in Shenandoah National Park

In 1917, black writer W. E. B. Du Bois observed that the impact of "ever-recurring race discrimination" had made it so difficult to travel to any number of destinations, from popular resorts to major cities, that it was now "a puzzling query as to what to do with vacations". It was a problem that came to affect an increasing number of black people in the first decades of the 20th century. Tens of thousands of southern African-Americans migrated from farms in the south to factories and domestic service in the north. No longer confined to living at a subsistence level, many gained disposable income and time to engage in leisure travel.

The development of affordable mass-produced automobiles liberated black Americans from having to rely on the "Jim Crow cars"—smoky, battered, and uncomfortable railroad carriages which were the separate but decidedly unequal alternatives to more salubrious whites-only carriages. One black magazine writer commented in 1933, in an automobile, "it's mighty good to be the skipper for a change, and pilot our craft whither and where we will. We feel like Vikings. What if our craft is blunt of nose and limited of power and our sea is macademized; it's good for the spirit to just give the old railroad Jim Crow the laugh."

Middle-class black people throughout the United States "were not at all sure how to behave or how whites would behave toward them", as Bart Landry puts it. In Cincinnati, the African American newspaper editor Wendell Dabney wrote of the situation in the 1920s that "hotels, restaurants, eating and drinking places, almost universally are closed to all people in whom the least tincture of colored blood can be detected". Areas without significant black populations outside the South often refused to accommodate them: black travelers to Salt Lake City in the 1920s were stranded without a hotel if they had to stop there overnight. Only six percent of the more than 100 motels that lined U.S. Route 66 in Albuquerque, admitted black customers. Across the whole state of New Hampshire, only three motels in 1956 served African-Americans.

George Schuyler reported in 1943, "Many colored families have motored all across the United States without being able to secure overnight accommodations at a single tourist camp or hotel." He suggested that black Americans would find it easier to travel abroad than in their own country. In Chicago in 1945, St. Clair Drake and Horace Cayton reported that "the city's hotel managers, by general agreement, do not sanction the use of hotel facilities by Negroes, particularly sleeping accommodations". One incident reported by Drake and Cayton illustrated the discriminatory treatment meted out even to black people within racially mixed groups:

Two colored schoolteachers and several white friends attended a luncheon at an exclusive coffee shop. The Negro women were allowed to sit down, but the waitress ignored them and served the white women. One of the colored women protested and was told that she could eat in the kitchen.

=== Coping with discrimination on the road ===
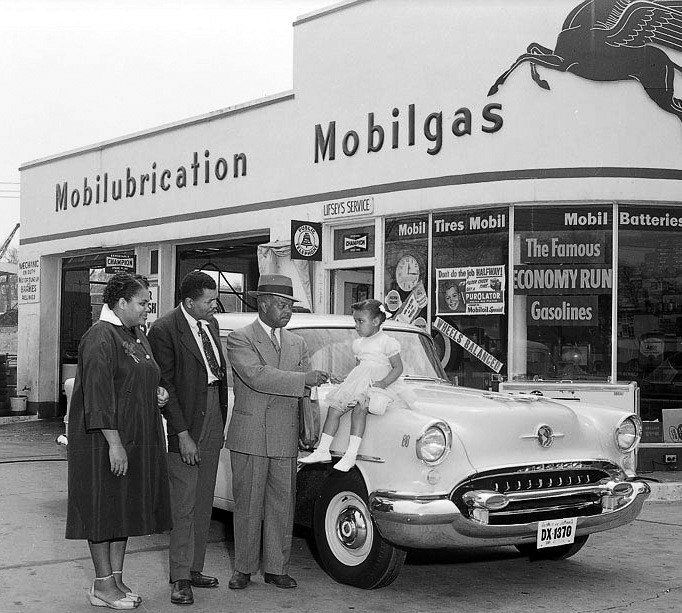
An African American family with their new Oldsmobile in Washington, D.C., 1955

While automobiles made it much easier for black Americans to be independently mobile, the difficulties they faced in traveling were such that, as Lester Granger of the National Urban League put it, "so far as travel is concerned, Negroes are America's last pioneers". Black travelers often had to carry buckets or portable toilets in the trunks of their cars because they were usually barred from bathrooms and rest areas in service stations and roadside stops. Travel essentials such as gasoline were difficult to purchase because of discrimination at gas stations.

To avoid such problems on long trips, African Americans often packed meals and carried containers of gasoline in their cars. Writing of the road trips he made as a boy in the 1950s, Courtland Milloy of the Washington Post recalled that his mother spent the evening before the trip frying chicken and boiling eggs so that his family would have something to eat along the way the next day.

One black motorist observed in the early 1940s that while black travelers felt free in the mornings, by the early afternoon a "small cloud" had appeared. By the late afternoon, "it casts a shadow of apprehension on our hearts and sours us a little. 'Where', it asks us, 'will you stay tonight?'" They often had to spend hours in the evening trying to find somewhere to stay, sometimes resorting to sleeping in haylofts or in their own cars if they could not find anywhere. One alternative, if it was available, was to arrange in advance to sleep at the homes of black friends in towns or cities along their route. However, this meant detours and an abandonment of the spontaneity that for many was a key attraction of motoring.

The civil rights leader John Lewis recalled how his family prepared for a trip in 1951:

There would be no restaurant for us to stop at until we were well out of the South, so we took our restaurant right in the car with us.... Stopping for gas and to use the bathroom took careful planning. Uncle Otis had made this trip before, and he knew which places along the way offered "colored" bathrooms and which were better just to pass on by. Our map was marked and our route was planned that way, by the distances between service stations where it would be safe for us to stop.

Finding accommodation was one of the greatest challenges faced by black travelers. Not only did many hotels, motels, and boarding houses refuse to serve black customers, but thousands of towns across the United States declared themselves "sundown towns", which all non-whites had to leave by sunset. Huge numbers of towns across the country were effectively off-limits to African Americans. By the end of the 1960s, there were an estimated 10,000 sundown towns across the United States—including large suburbs such as Glendale, California (population 60,000 at the time); Levittown, New York (80,000); and Warren, Michigan (180,000). Over half the incorporated communities in Illinois were sundown towns. The unofficial slogan of Anna, Illinois, which had violently expelled its African American population in 1909, was "Ain't No Niggers Allowed".

Even in towns which did not exclude overnight stays by black people, accommodations were often very limited. African Americans migrating to California to find work in the early 1940s often found themselves camping by the roadside overnight for lack of any hotel accommodation along the way. They were acutely aware of the discriminatory treatment that they received. Courtland Milloy's mother, who took him and his brother on road trips when they were children, recalled:

... after riding all day, I'd say to myself, 'Wouldn't it be nice if we could spend the night in one of those hotels?' or, 'Wouldn't it be great if we could stop for a real meal and a cup of coffee?' We'd see the little white children jumping into motel swimming pools, and you all would be in the back seat of a hot car, sweating and fighting.

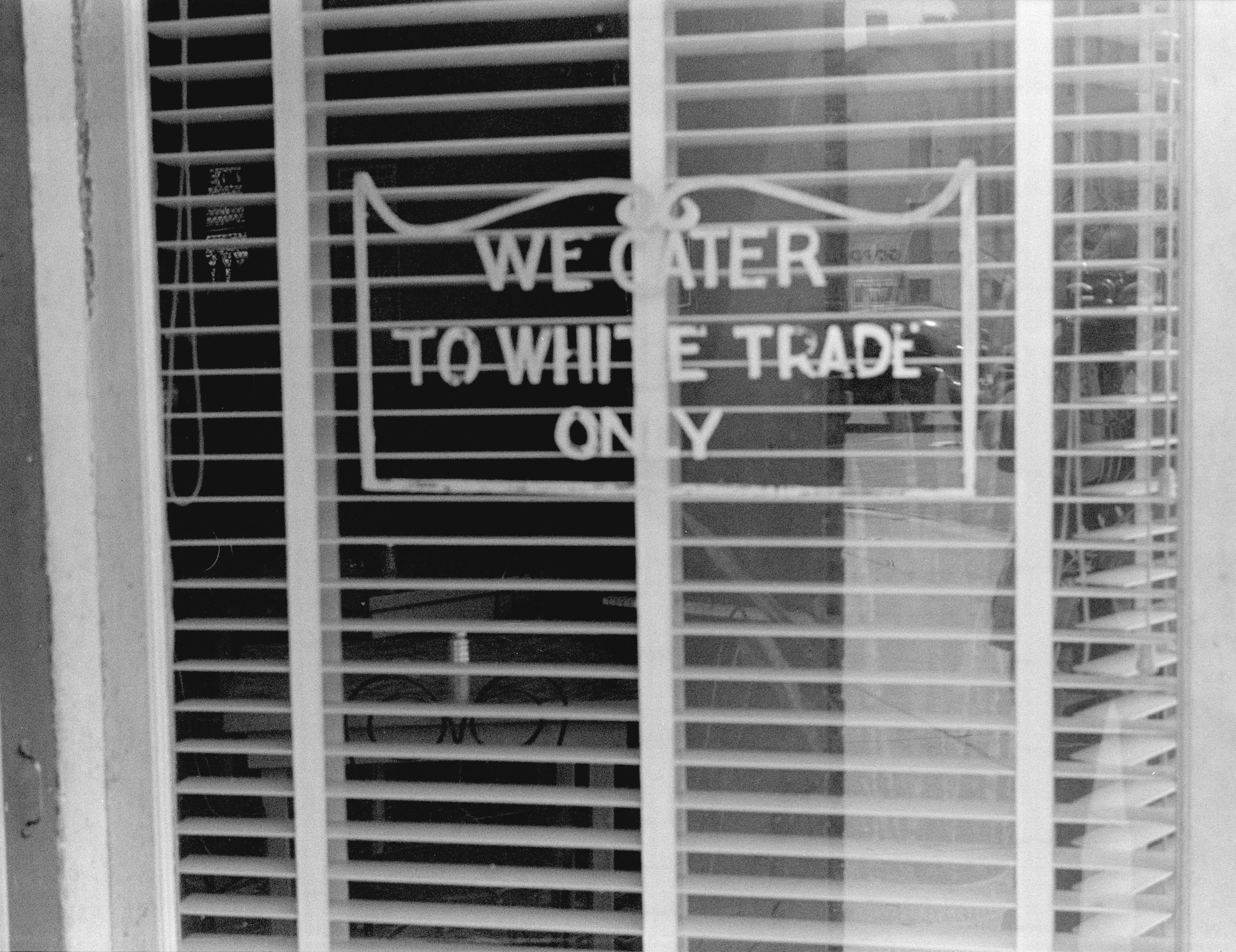
"We cater to white trade only"; many hotels and restaurants excluded African Americans, such as this one in Ohio, seen in 1938.

African American travelers faced real physical risks because of the widely differing rules of segregation that existed from place to place and the possibility of extrajudicial violence against them. Activities that were accepted in one place could provoke violence a few miles down the road. Transgressing formal or unwritten racial codes, even inadvertently, could put travelers in considerable danger.

Even driving etiquette was affected by racism; in the Mississippi Delta region, local custom prohibited black people from overtaking whites, to prevent their raising dust from the unpaved roads to cover white-owned cars. A pattern emerged of whites purposely damaging black-owned cars to put their owners "in their place". Stopping anywhere that was not known to be safe, even to allow children in a car to relieve themselves, presented a risk; Milloy noted that his parents would urge him and his brother to control their need to use a bathroom until they could find a safe place to stop, as "those backroads were simply too dangerous for parents to stop to let their little black children pee". Racist local laws, discriminatory social codes, segregated commercial facilities, racial profiling by police, and sundown towns made road journeys a minefield of constant uncertainty and risk.

Road trip narratives by black people reflected their unease and the dangers they faced, presenting a more complex outlook from those written by whites extolling the joys of the road. Milloy recalls the menacing environment that he encountered during his childhood, in which he learned of "so many black travelers ... just not making it to their destinations". Even foreign black dignitaries were not immune to the discrimination that African American travelers routinely encountered. In one high-profile incident, Komla Agbeli Gbedemah, the finance minister of newly independent Ghana, was refused service at a Howard Johnson's restaurant in Dover, Delaware, while traveling to Washington, D.C., even after identifying himself by his state position to the restaurant staff. The snub caused an international incident, to which an embarrassed President Dwight D. Eisenhower responded by inviting Gbedemah to breakfast at the White House.

Repeated and sometimes violent incidents of discrimination directed against black African diplomats, particularly on U.S. Route 40, the southern part of the principal route between New York and Washington, D.C., led to the administration of President John F. Kennedy setting up a Special Protocol Service Section within the State Department to assist black diplomats traveling and living within the United States. The State Department considered issuing copies of The Negro Motorist Green Book to black diplomats, but eventually decided against steering them to black-friendly public accommodations as it wanted them to be treated equally to white diplomats.

John A. Williams wrote in his 1965 book, This Is My Country Too, that he did not believe "white travelers have any idea of how much nerve and courage it requires for a Negro to drive coast to coast in America". He achieved it with "nerve, courage, and a great deal of luck", supplemented by "a rifle and shotgun, a road atlas, and Travelguide, a listing of places in America where Negroes can stay without being embarrassed, insulted, or worse". He noted that black drivers needed to be particularly cautious in the South, where they were advised to wear a chauffeur's cap or have one visible on the front seat and pretend they were delivering a car for a white person. Along the way, he had to endure a stream of "insults of clerks, bellboys, attendants, cops, and strangers in passing cars". There was a constant need to keep his mind on the danger he faced; as he was well aware, "[black] people have a way of disappearing on the road".

== Role of the Green Book ==
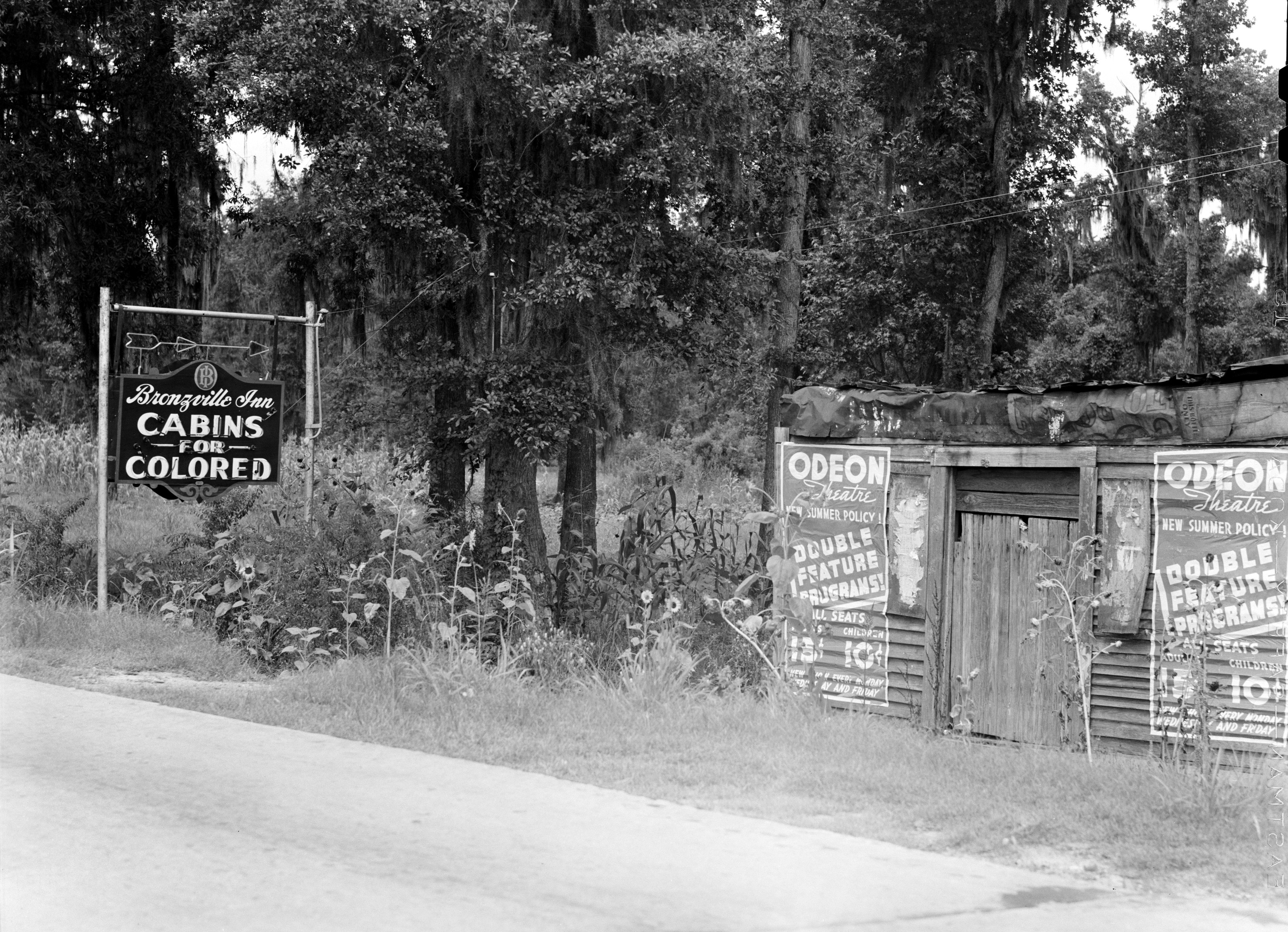
The Green Book listed places, like this motel in South Carolina, that provided accommodation for black travelers.

Segregation meant that facilities for African American motorists in some areas were limited, but entrepreneurs of varied races realized that opportunities existed in marketing goods and services specifically to black patrons. These included directories of hotels, camps, road houses, and restaurants that would serve African Americans. Jewish travelers, who had also long experienced discrimination at many vacation spots, created guides for their own community, though they were at least able to visibly blend in more easily with the general population. African Americans followed suit with publications such as Hackley and Harrison's Hotel and Apartment Guide for Colored Travelers, published in 1930 to cover "Board, Rooms, Garage Accommodations, etc. in 300 Cities in the United States and Canada". This book was published by Sadie Harrison, who was the Secretary of The Negro Welfare Council (or Negro Urban League).

The Negro Motorist Green Book was one of the best known of the African American travel guides. It was conceived in 1932 and first published in 1936 by Victor Hugo Green, a World War I veteran from New York City who worked as a mail carrier and later as a travel agent. He said his aim was "to give the Negro traveler information that will keep him from running into difficulties, embarrassments and to make his trip more enjoyable". According to an editorial written by Novera C. Dashiell in the 1956 edition of the Green Book, "the idea crystallized when not only [Green] but several friends and acquaintances complained of the difficulties encountered; oftentimes painful embarrassments suffered which ruined a vacation or business trip".

Green asked his readers to provide information "on the Negro motoring conditions, scenic wonders in your travels, places visited of interest and short stories on one's motoring experience". He offered a reward of one dollar for each accepted account, which he increased to five dollars by 1941. He also obtained information from colleagues in the U.S. Postal Service, who would "ask around on their routes" to find suitable public accommodations. The Postal Service was and remains one of the largest employers of African Americans, and its employees were ideally situated to inform Green of which places were safe and hospitable to African American travelers.

The Green Book's motto, displayed on the front cover, urged black travelers to "Carry your Green Book with you – You may need it". The 1949 edition included a quote from Mark Twain: "Travel is fatal to prejudice", inverting Twain's original meaning; as Cotten Seiler puts it, "here it was the visited, rather than the visitors, who would find themselves enriched by the encounter". Green commented in 1940 that the Green Book had given black Americans "something authentic to travel by and to make traveling better for the Negro".

Its principal goal was to provide accurate information on black-friendly accommodations to answer the constant question that faced black drivers: "Where will you spend the night?" The guide also helped recirculate the money spent by tourists within the black community.

As well as essential information on lodgings, service stations, and garages, it provided details of leisure facilities open to African Americans, including beauty salons, restaurants, nightclubs, and country clubs. The listings focused on four main categories—hotels, motels, tourist homes (private residences, usually owned by African Americans, which provided accommodation to travelers), and restaurants. They were arranged by state and subdivided by city, giving the name and address of each business. For an extra payment, businesses could have their listing displayed in bold type or have a star next to it to denote that they were "recommended".

The Green Book empowered Black women, both as entrepreneurs and travelers, and facilitated their mobility and economic independence during segregation. The Green Book listed numerous women-owned businesses, such as beauty salons and tourist homes, providing safe spaces and economic opportunities for Black women. The Black hair care industry was transformed by women like Annie M. Turnbo Malone and Madam C. J. Walker, who trained hundreds of women to operate their own companies, many of which were included in the Green Book.

Many such establishments were run by and for African Americans and, in some cases, were named after prominent figures in African American history. In North Carolina, such black-owned businesses included the Carver, Lincoln, and Booker T. Washington hotels, the Friendly City beauty parlor, the Black Beauty Tea Room, the New Progressive tailor shop, the Big Buster tavern, and the Blue Duck Inn. Each edition also included feature articles on travel and destinations and included a listing of black resorts such as Idlewild, Michigan; Oak Bluffs, Massachusetts; and Belmar, New Jersey. The state of New Mexico was particularly recommended as a place where most motels would welcome "guests on the basis of 'cash rather than color'".

=== Influence ===
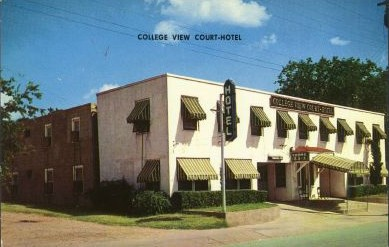
The College View Court-Hotel in Waco, Texas, advertised as "Waco's Finest for Negroes" in the 1950s

The Green Book attracted sponsorship from a great number of businesses, including the African American newspapers Call and Post of Cleveland, and the Louisville Leader of Louisville. Esso (later ExxonMobil), was also a sponsor, due in part to the efforts of a pioneering African American Esso sales representative named James "Billboard" Jackson. Additionally, Esso had a black focused marketing division promote the Green Book as enabling Esso's black customers to "go further with less anxiety." By contrast, Shell gas stations were known to refuse black customers.

The 1949 edition included an Esso endorsement message that told readers: "As representatives of the Esso Standard Oil Co., we are pleased to recommend the Green Book for your travel convenience. Keep one on hand each year and when you are planning your trips, let Esso Touring Service supply you with maps and complete routings, and for real 'Happy Motoring' – use Esso Products and Esso Service wherever you find the Esso sign." Photographs of some African-American entrepreneurs who owned Esso gas stations appeared in the pages of the Green Book.

Although Green usually refrained from editorializing in the Green Book, he let his readers' letters speak for the influence of his guide. William Smith of Hackensack, New Jersey, described it as a "credit to the Negro Race" in a letter published in the 1938 edition. He commented:

It is a book badly needed among our Race since the advent of the motor age. Realizing the only way we knew where and how to reach our pleasure resorts was in a way of speaking, by word of mouth, until the publication of The Negro Motorist Green Book ... We earnestly believe that [it] will mean as much if not more to us as the A.A.A. means to the white race.

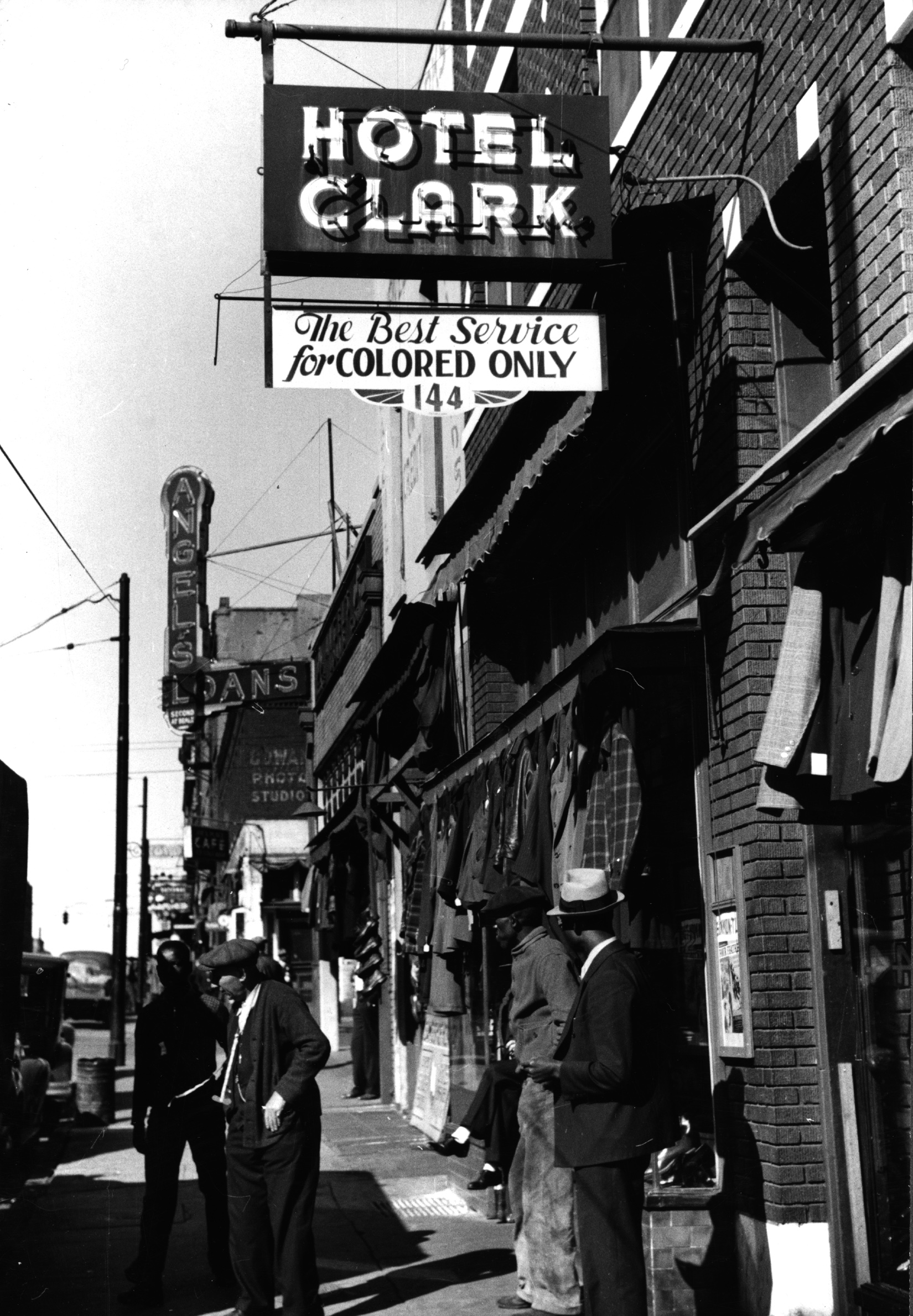
The "Colored only" Hotel Clark in Memphis, Tennessee, c. 1939

Earl Hutchinson Sr., the father of journalist Earl Ofari Hutchinson, wrote of a 1955 move from Chicago to California that "you literally didn't leave home without [the Green Book]". Ernest Green, one of the Little Rock Nine, used the Green Book to navigate the 1,000 miles (1,600 km) from Arkansas to Virginia in the 1950s and commented that "it was one of the survival tools of segregated life". According to the civil rights leader Julian Bond, recalling his parents' use of the Green Book, "it was a guidebook that told you not where the best places were to eat, but where there was any place". Bond commented:

You think about the things that most travelers take for granted, or most people today take for granted. If I go to New York City and want a hair cut, it's pretty easy for me to find a place where that can happen, but it wasn't easy then. White barbers would not cut black peoples' hair. White beauty parlors would not take black women as customers — hotels and so on, down the line. You needed the Green Book to tell you where you can go without having doors slammed in your face.

While the Green Book was intended to make life easier for those living under Jim Crow, its publisher looked forward to a time when such guidebooks would no longer be necessary. As Green wrote, "there will be a day sometime in the near future when this guide will not have to be published. That is when we as a race will have equal opportunities and privileges in the United States. It will be a great day for us to suspend this publication for then we can go as we please, and without embarrassment." By the early 1960s, some members of the community were questioning whether the guide might be inadvertently supporting Jim Crow laws by directing travelers to friendly accommodations.

== Publishing history ==
Sign in Statesboro, Georgia: "Colored Motel, 2 blocks", photographed in 1979

The Green Book was published locally in New York City, but its popularity was such that from 1937 it was distributed nationally with input from Charles McDowell, a collaborator on Negro affairs for the U.S. Travel Bureau, a government agency. With new editions published annually from 1936 to 1940, the Green Book's publication was suspended during World War II and resumed in 1946.

Its scope expanded greatly during its years of publication; from covering only the New York City area in the first edition, it eventually covered facilities in most of the United States and parts of Canada (primarily Montreal), Mexico, and Bermuda. Coverage was good in the Eastern United States and weak in Great Plains states, such as North Dakota, where there were few black residents. It eventually sold around 15,000 copies per year, distributed by mail order, by churches and black-owned businesses as well as by Esso service stations; this was unusual for the oil industry at the time but over a third of the stations were franchised to African Americans.

The 1937 edition, of 16 pages, sold for 25 cents; by 1957, the price increased to $1.25. With the book's growing success, Green retired from the post office and hired a small publishing staff that operated from 20 West 135th Street in Harlem. He also established a vacation reservation service in 1947 to take advantage of the post-war boom in automobile travel. By 1949, the Green Book had expanded to more than 80 pages, including advertisements. The Green Book was printed by Gibraltar Printing and Publishing Co.

The 1951 Green Book recommended that black-owned businesses raise their standards, as travelers were "no longer content to pay top prices for inferior accommodations and services". The quality of black-owned lodgings was coming under scrutiny, as many prosperous black people found them to be second-rate compared to the white-owned lodgings from which they were excluded. The 1951 "Railroad Edition" featured porters, an icon of American travel. In 1952, Green renamed the publication The Negro Travelers' Green Book, in recognition of its coverage of international destinations requiring travel by plane and ship.

Although segregation was still in force, by state laws in the South and often by practice elsewhere, the wide circulation of the Green Book had attracted growing interest from white businesses that wanted to tap into the potential sales of the black market. The 1955 edition noted:

A few years after its publication ... white business has also recognized its [The Green Book's] value and it is now in use by the Esso Standard Oil Co., The American Automobile Assn. and its affiliate automobile clubs throughout the country, other automobile clubs, air lines, travel bureaus, travelers aid, libraries and thousands of subscribers.

After Green died in 1960, Alma Green and her staff took over responsibility for the publication.

By the start of the 1960s, the Green Book's market was beginning to erode. Even before the passage of the Civil Rights Act of 1964, African American civil rights activism was having the effect of lessening racial segregation in public facilities. An increasing number of middle class African Americans were beginning to question whether guides such as the Green Book were accommodating Jim Crow by steering black travelers to segregated businesses rather than encouraging them to push for equal access. Black-owned motels in remote locations off state highways lost customers to a new generation of integrated interstate motels located near freeway exits. The 1963 Green Book acknowledged that the activism of the civil rights movement had "widened the areas of public accommodations accessible to all", but it defended the continued listing of black-friendly businesses because "a family planning for a vacation hopes for one that is free of tensions and problems".

The final edition was renamed, now called the Travelers' Green Book: 1966–67 International Edition: For Vacation Without Aggravation; it was the last to be published after the Civil Rights Act of 1964 made the guide effectively obsolete by outlawing racial discrimination in public accommodation. That edition included significant changes that reflected the post-Civil Rights Act outlook. As the new title indicated, it was no longer just for the Negro, nor solely for the motorist, as its publishers sought to widen its appeal. Although the content continued to proclaim its mission of highlighting leisure options for black travelers, the cover featured a drawing of a blonde Caucasian woman waterskiing—a sign of how, as Michael Ra-Shon Hall puts it, "the Green Book 'whitened' its surface and internationalized its scope, while still remaining true to its founding mission to ensure the security of African American travelers both in the U.S. and abroad".

== Representation in other media ==
In the 2000s, academics, artists, curators, and writers exploring the history of African American travel in the United States during the Jim Crow era revived interest in the Green Book. The result has been a number of projects, books and other works referring to the Green Book. The book itself has acquired a high value as a collector's item; a "partly perished" copy of the 1941 edition sold at auction in March 2015 for $22,500. Some examples are listed below.

=== Digital projects ===
- The New York Public Library's Schomburg Center for Research in Black Culture has published digitized copies of 21 issues of the Green Book, dating from 1937 to 1966–1967. To accompany the digitizations, the NYPL Labs have developed an interactive visualization of the books' data to enable web users to plot their own road trips and see heat maps of listings.
- The Green Book Project, with an endorsement from the Tulsa City-County Library's African American Resource Center, created a digital map of the Green Book locations on historypin, invited users of the Green Book to post their photos and personal accounts about Green Book sites.

=== Exhibitions ===
- In 2003, the Smithsonian Institution's National Museum of American History included the Green Book in an exhibition, America on the Move.
- In 2007, the book was featured in a traveling exhibition called Places of Refuge: The Dresser Trunk Project, organized by William Daryl Williams, the director of the School of Architecture and Interior Design at the University of Cincinnati. The exhibition drew on the Green Book to highlight artifacts and locations associated with travel by black people during segregation, using dresser trunks to reflect venues such as hotels, restaurants, nightclubs, and a Negro league baseball park.
- In late 2014, the Gilmore Car Museum in Hickory Corners, Michigan, installed a permanent exhibit on the Green Book that features a 1956 copy of the book that guests can review as well as video interviews of those that utilized it.
- In 2016, a 1941 copy of the book was displayed at the Smithsonian National Museum of African American History and Culture, when the museum opened.
- In June 2016, a copy of the book on loan from The New York Public Library was featured in the Missouri History Museum's exhibition Main Street Through St. Louis.
- A copy of the book is featured in the Lyndon Baines Johnson Library and Museum's temporary exhibition, Get in the Game: The Fight for Equality in American Sports, on view from April 2018 through January 13, 2019.
- The Heinz History Center hosted a temporary exhibition titled The Negro Motorist Green Book from May 13, 2023, through August 13, 2023.

=== Films ===
- Calvin Alexander Ramsey and Becky Wible Searles interviewed people who traveled with the Green Book as well as Victor Green's relatives as part of the production of the documentary The Green Book Chronicles (2016).
- 100 Miles to Lordsburg (2015) is a short film, written by Phillip Lewis and producer Brad Littlefield, and directed by Karen Borger. It is about a black couple crossing New Mexico in 1961 with aid of the Green Book.
- Green Book is a 2018 biographical comedy-drama with Viggo Mortensen and Mahershala Ali based on true story of a white man hired as driver and bodyguard for a black entertainer. It won Best Picture at the 91st Academy Awards.
- The documentary film The Green Book: Guide to Freedom by Yoruba Richen was scheduled to first air on February 25, 2019, on the Smithsonian Channel in the US.
- The 2019 virtual reality documentary Traveling While Black places the viewer directly inside a portrait of African American travelers making use of the Green Book.

=== Literature ===
- Ramsey also wrote a play, called The Green Book: A Play in Two Acts, which debuted in Atlanta in August 2011 after a staged reading at the Lincoln Theatre in Washington, DC in 2010. It centers on a tourist home in Jefferson City, Missouri. A black military officer, his wife, and a Jewish survivor of the Holocaust spend the night in the home just before the civil rights activist W. E. B. Du Bois is scheduled to deliver a speech in town. The Jewish traveler comes to the home after being shocked to find that the hotel where he planned to stay has a "No Negroes Allowed" notice posted in its lobby—an allusion to the problems of discrimination that Jews and black people both faced at the time. The play was highly successful, gaining an extension of several weeks beyond its planned closing date.
- A 2017 nonfiction work entitled The Post-Racial Negro Green Book (Brown Bird Books) makes use of the original Green Book's format and aesthetic as a medium for cataloging 21st century racism toward African Americans.
- Alvin Hall's nonfiction Driving the Green Book: A Road Trip Through the Living History of Black Resistance (HarperCollins). Hall sets out to revisit the world of the Green Book to instruct us all on the real history of the guide that saved many lives. With his friend Janée Woods Weber, he drove from New York to Detroit to New Orleans, visiting motels, restaurants, shops, and stores where Black Americans once found a friendly welcome.

=== Audio ===
- December 2016 saw Alvin Hall present The Green Book Documenting a little-known aspect of racial segregation: the challenges—for mid-20th-century America's new black middle class—of travelling in their own country. Alvin's journey starts in Tallahassee, Florida, where he was born and raised, takes him through Alabama and Tennessee, and concludes in Ferguson, Missouri.
- In mid-2019, Hall and activist Janée Woods Weber drove from Detroit to New Orleans. The route they drove was based on information from The Negro Motorist Green Book.

=== Photography projects ===
- Architecture at sites listed in the Green Book was documented by photographer Candacy Taylor in collaboration with the National Park Service's Route 66 Corridor Preservation Program. The book was published by Abrams in 2020 as Overground Railroad: The Green Book and the Roots of Black Travel in America.

== Site preservation ==
Los Angeles, in 2016, considered offering special historical protection to the sites that kept black travelers safe. Ken Bernstein, principal planner for the city's Office of Historic Resources notes, "At the very least, these sites can be incorporated into our city's online inventory system. They are part of the story of African Americans in Los Angeles, and the story of Los Angeles itself writ large."

=== Notable listings ===
- Imperial Hotel, Thomasville, Georgia
- Harriet Beecher Stowe House

A number of sites in the Green Book are listed on the National Register of Historic Places:

- A.G. Gaston Motel, Birmingham, Alabama
- Allen University, Columbia, South Carolina
- Apollo Theater, New York, New York
- Avalon Hotel, Rochester, Minnesota
- Booker T. Motel, Humboldt, Tennessee
- Coronado Lodge, Pueblo, Colorado
- Cummings' Guest House, Old Orchard Beach, Maine
- Ebony Guest House, Florence, South Carolina
- Harriet Cornwell House, Columbia, South Carolina
- Harrison's Guest House, Las Vegas, Nevada
- Hotel Theresa, New York, New York
- Holman's Barber Shop, Columbia, South Carolina
- Ida Mae Francis Tourist Home, Harrisonburg, Virginia
- Latimore Tourist Home, Russellville, Arkansas
- Leveey's Funeral Home, Columbia, South Carolina
- Liberty Hotel, Atlantic City, New Jersey
- Limerick-Frazier House, Austin, Texas
- Lorraine Motel, Memphis, Tennessee
- Manse Hotel and Annex, Cincinnati, Ohio
- Rossonian Hotel, Denver, Colorado
- Ruth's Beauty Parlor, Columbia, South Carolina
- Winks Panorama, Pinecliffe, Colorado

== See also ==
- Black Travel Movement
- AAA racial discrimination
- Black-owned businesses
- List of African American hotels, motels, and boarding houses
- African American resorts
