= Victor Hugo Green =

American writer of The Green Book travel guides (1892–1960)

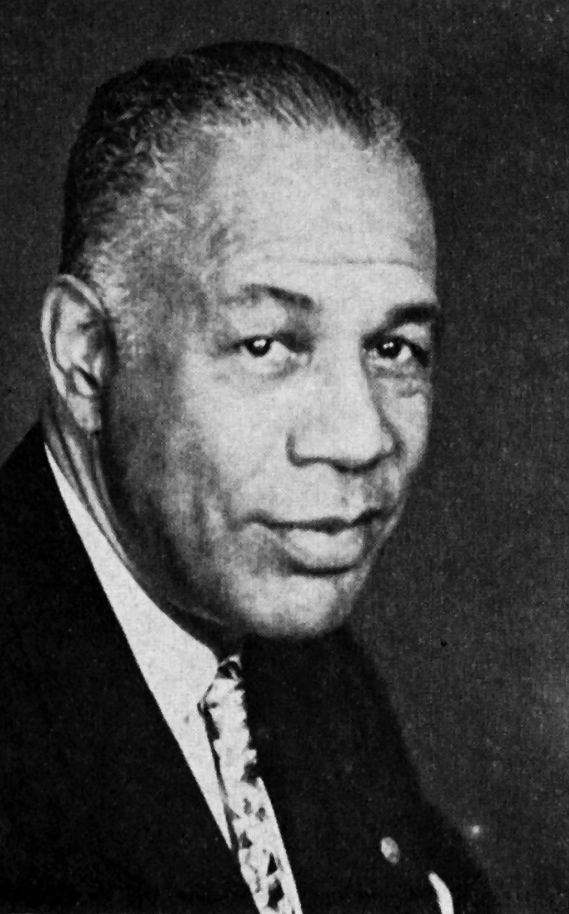
- Green in 1956
- Born: November 9, 1892; Manhattan, New York, U.S.
- Died: 16 October 1960 (aged 67); Manhattan, New York, U.S.
- Resting place: Hackensack Cemetery, New Jersey
- Occupations: Postal worker, travel writer
- Notable work: The Negro Motorist Green Book
- Spouse: Alma S. Duke (m. 1918)

Victor Hugo Green (November 9, 1892 – October 16, 1960) was an American postal employee and travel writer from Harlem, New York City, best known for developing and writing what became known as The Green Book, a travel guide for African Americans in the United States. During the time the book was published, choices of lodging, restaurants and even gas stations were limited for black people in many places, both in the Southern United States and outside this region. The book was first published as The Negro Motorist Green Book and later as The Negro Travelers' Green Book. The books were published from 1936 to 1966. He printed 15,000 copies each year.

In the 1930s, Green began his work by compiling data on stores, motels, and gas stations in the New York City area that welcomed black travelers, and published his first guide in 1936. Green's guide was so popular that he immediately began to expand its coverage the next year to other US destinations, adding hotels and restaurants as well. After retiring from the Postal Service, Green continued to work on updating issues of The Green Book. In addition, he developed the related travel agency business he had established in 1947.

== Biography ==
Victor Hugo Green, named after the noted French author, was born on November 9, 1892, in Manhattan, New York City. He was the eldest of three children of Alice A. (Holmes) and William H. Green. His family moved and he grew up in Hackensack, New Jersey. Starting in 1913 he worked in Bergen County, New Jersey as a postal carrier for the United States Post Office Department.

On September 8, 1917, in Brooklyn, New York Green married Alma S. Duke (1889–1978) of Richmond, Virginia. She came to New York as part of the Great Migration from the South to northern cities in the early twentieth century. After their marriage, the couple moved to Harlem, New York, which was attracting blacks from across the country. It developed as a center of black arts and culture in the period of the Harlem Renaissance. They lived in an apartment at 580 St. Nicholas Avenue.

Green was employed by the United States Post Office Department as a letter carrier. He was subsequently drafted into the United States Army to serve in World War I, even though he had requested exemption from the draft due to his "employment in the transmission of mail." He served as a member of the Supply Company of the 350th Field Artillery, 92nd Division, rising to the rank of Regimental Supply Sergeant. He sailed for France with his unit on June 30, 1918, from Hoboken, New Jersey on the troop carrier SS President Grant. He returned to the United States from Brest, France on the troop carrier SS Maui on February 16, 1919, landing in Hoboken on the 28th.

== Publishing and travel career ==
The Green Book publications (1936–1966): In 1936, Green published the first iteration of The Negro Motorist Green Book (1936). These editions were a publication series for the intended purpose of helping African American roadtrippers travel across America safely. The guidebook featured thousands of businesses, either black-owned or that catered to African Americans during the Jim Crow era. The Guide also allowed African American travelers to safely venture through discriminatory and segregated areas of the United States by avoiding potential harassment and violence from racist business owners.; thereby, enabling The Negro Motorist Green Book to become a tool for African Americans to subvert white supremacy. The many editions of the Green Book established a general roadmap that shows distinct black geographies across America–those of which were generally unknown to white institutions.

Black Americans began to join in the popular activity of travel by car. During these years, they were restricted to segregated accommodations by state laws in the South, and often discriminated against in other areas of the United States.

In 1936, Green "thought of doing something about this. He thought of a listing, as comprehensive as possible, of all first-class hotels throughout the United States that catered to Negroes." He collected information on hotels, restaurants and gas stations that served African Americans for his first edition of The Negro Motorist Green Book. Since some towns did not have any hotels or motels that would accept African American guests, he listed "tourist homes," where owners would rent rooms to travelers. His first edition had data for facilities only in the New York metropolitan area. In his introduction, Green wrote:

There will be a day sometime in the near future when this guide will not have to be published. That is when we as a race will have equal rights and privileges in the United States.

Green created a publishing office in Harlem to support his guide. In 1947, he established a Vacation Reservation Service, a travel agency to book reservations at black-owned establishments. By 1949, the guide included international destinations in Bermuda and Mexico; it listed places for food, lodging, and gas stations. In 1952, Green changed the name to The Negro Travelers' Green Book. His travel agency office was located at 200 West 135th Street in Harlem, New York.

The Green Book was printed by Gibraltar Printing and Publishing Co. at 800 Sixth Avenue (at West 27th Street) in New York City. The owner of Gibraltar Printing was Samuel Jacob Glener (1904–1961). Similar guides had been published for Jewish travelers in some areas. Victor Hugo Green printed 15,000 copies each year of The Green Book, marketing them to white as well as black-owned businesses to demonstrate "the growing affluence of African Americans." At the time, Esso franchised gas stations to African Americans, when some other companies did not. The Esso stations became popular sales outlets for the book.

During the Jim Crow era, the book garnered a large appeal within the African American community as many began to popularize the phrase "carry your Green Book with you" when traveling. It outlined establishments where African Americans would be free from discrimination. Through its series of publications, Green's The Negro Motorist Green Book appealed to a large majority of the African American population, as such, during the civil rights movement it was credited as one of the forerunners in American literature that championed the cause.

== Personal life ==
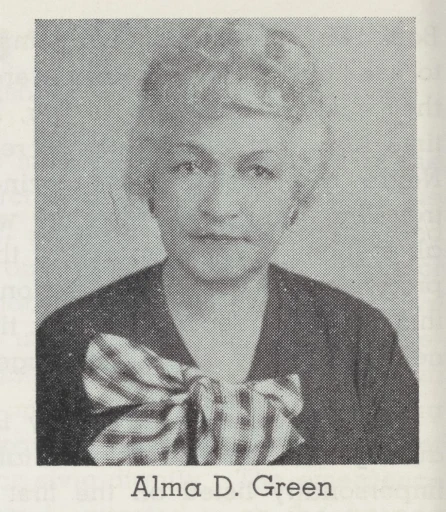
Alma Duke Green, pictured in the 1961 edition of "The Green Book"(NYPL)

Following Victor's marriage with Alma Duke Green (June 9, 1889 – March 1978) in 1918, the two would go on to create the first editions of the Green Book. Alma was the book's editor for several years and made other significant contributions. Alma died in March 1978.

According to the 1956 edition, "several friends and acquaintances complained of the difficulties encountered; oftentimes painful embarrassments suffered which ruined a vacation or business trip."

The Green Book Chronicles (2020), a film by Calvin Alexander Ramsey and Becky Wible Searles, have noted that Alma "appears to have actively supported and been involved in this venture from the start, eventually taking over as editor when Victor stepped away from that role."

Green died on October 16, 1960, in Manhattan, New York City at age 67. After his death, publication continued, with his widow Alma serving as editor, until 1966. Passage of the Civil Rights Act of 1964 and legal end to racial segregation in public facilities marked the beginning of the guide's obsolescence; the goal that Green had described in his introduction to the first edition of his work.

== In popular culture ==
- Calvin Alexander Ramsey, The Green Book Chronicles, a play that had a staged reading on September 15, 2010, at the Lincoln Theatre in Washington, DC; It premiered in Atlanta, Georgia, in 2011.
- The Dresser Trunk Project (2007), traveling exhibit about black travel during segregation, organized by William Daryl Williams, director of School of Architecture and Interior Design, University of Cincinnati.
- Green Book (2018), dir. Peter Farrelly, a biographical drama influenced by African American pianist Don Shirley, and actor Frank Vallelonga, who traveled through the Deep South during 1962. Green Book premiered at the Toronto International Film Festival where it won the Oscar for best picture, best supporting actor and best original screenplay in 2018.
