= Nancy Wood (author) =

American author, poet, and photographer (1936–2013)

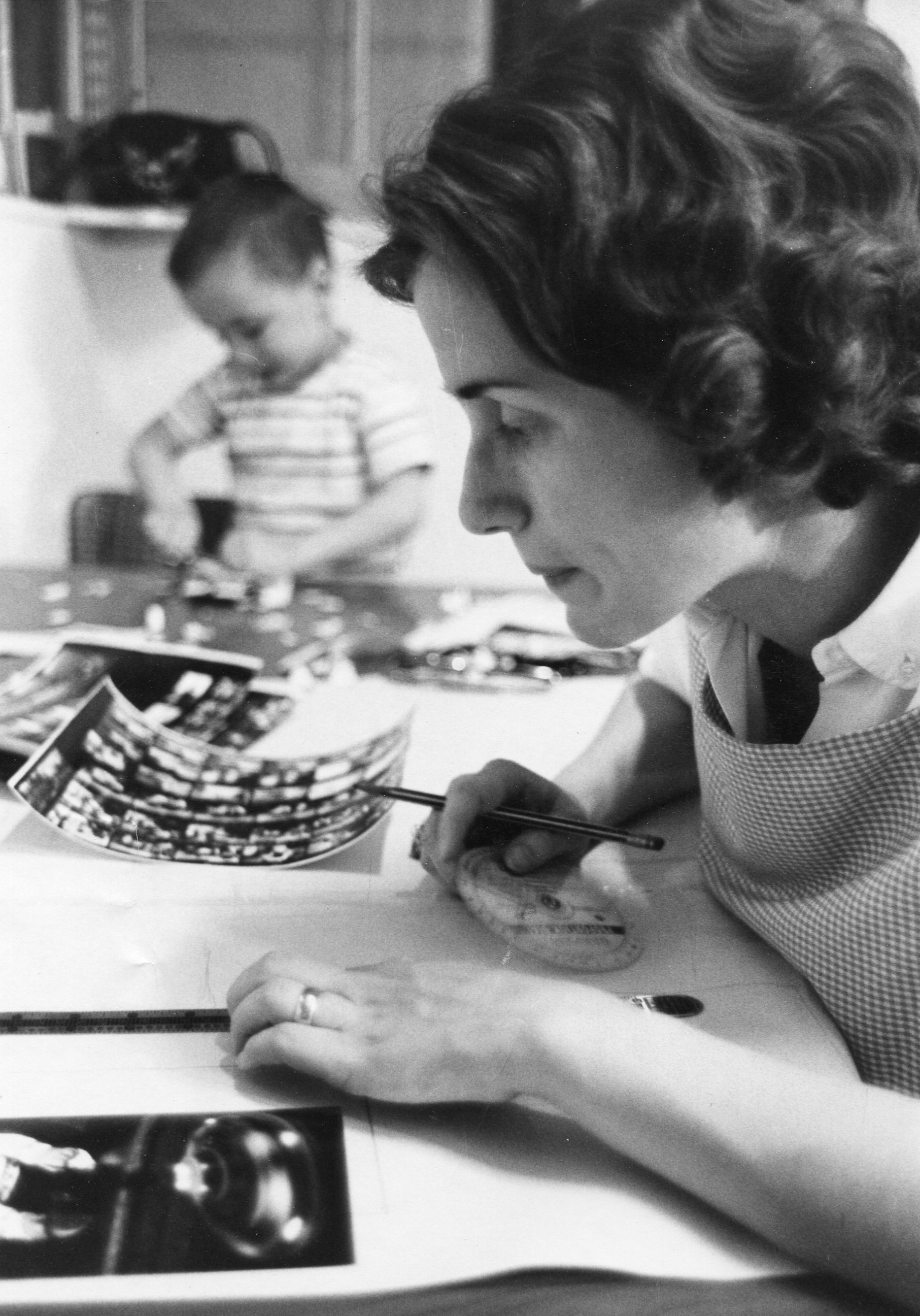
- Wood in 1961
- Born: June 20, 1936; Trenton, New Jersey, United States
- Died: March 12, 2013 (aged 76); Eldorado, New Mexico, United States
- Education: Bucknell University
- Occupations: Writer, photographer
- Writing career
- Period: 1963–2013
- Genres: Poetry, children's literature, fiction, nonfiction

Nancy Wood (June 20, 1936 – March 12, 2013) was an American author, poet, and photographer. Wood published numerous collections of poetry as well as children's novels, fiction, and nonfiction. Major themes and influences in her work were the Native American cultures of the Southwestern United States.

Her career, which spanned over five decades, included 28 publications of prose and poetry, and several photograph collections. Wood was a National Endowment for the Arts fellow, and a recipient of the Lee Bennett Hopkins Poetry Award.

== Early life ==
Wood was born and raised in Trenton, New Jersey, to an Irish Catholic family. She began work as a writer at 14 at the Beachcomber newspaper on Long Beach Island, NJ. She attended Bucknell University in Lewisburg, Pennsylvania.

== Career ==
Wood moved to Colorado in 1958, where she lived until 1985 when she moved to New Mexico. After visiting Taos Pueblo in New Mexico in 1962, Wood became greatly influenced by the Puebloan peoples' culture and spiritual beliefs, which would come to inform her literary work. "It was 180 degrees from what I knew growing up," she said. "Nature was the center. I began to think in those terms–here was not just a 'religion' but a whole way of being and seeing."

Originally working as a writer, her first few books were collaborations with husband and photographer Myron Wood. Nancy and Myron founded their own publishing house for their first book, Central City: A Ballad of the West (1963). Her first work of poetry, Hollering Sun (1972), included Myron's photographs and was published by Simon and Schuster. Her second work of poetry was published by Doubleday in 1974, titled Many Winters: Prose and Poetry of the Pueblos. These and subsequent poetry works would be inspired by her time spent at the Taos Pueblo. Many Winters began a lasting collaboration with illustrator Frank Howell, who provided artwork and illustrations for Wood's poetry publications until his death in 1997. Nancy became a photographer in the mid-1970s and produced several nonfiction books with her writing and photographs: The Grass Roots People, Taos Pueblo, and When Buffalo Free the Mountains.

Wood published children's books including How the Tiny People Grew Tall: An Original Creation Tale (2005), and Mr. and Mrs. God in the Creation Kitchen (2006), inspired by Puebloan creation myths. Her novels include Thunderwoman (1999), which retells a Pueblo creation myth, and The Soledad Crucifixion (2012), which reflects Pueblo and Catholic history and culture in New Mexico. In 2007, Wood published Eye of the West, a retrospective of her photographic work, through the University of New Mexico Press, followed by The Soledad Crucifixion, which earned her a posthumous Zia Award from the university.

Wood received many honors throughout her career, including a National Endowment for the Arts literary fellowship, and a Lee Bennett Hopkins Poetry Award for her 1993 book, Spirit Walker.

== Personal life ==
Wood was married three times: first to Oscar Dull, then Myron Wood, and John Brittingham. She had four children. In early 2013, Wood was diagnosed with terminal melanoma. She died at her home in Eldorado at Santa Fe, New Mexico on March 12, 2013.

== Bibliography ==
=== Poetry ===
- Hollering Sun, with photographs by Myron Wood, Simon & Schuster (New York, NY), 1972.
- Many Winters: Prose and Poetry of the Pueblos, illustrated by Frank Howell, Doubleday (New York, NY), 1974.
- War Cry on a Prayer Feather: Prose and Poetry of the Ute Indians, Doubleday New York, NY), 1979.
- Spirit Walker, illustrated by Frank Howell, Doubleday (New York, NY), 1993.
- Dancing Moons, illustrated by Frank Howell, Doubleday (New York, NY), 1995.
- Shaman's Circle, illustrated by Frank Howell, Delacorte (New York, NY), 1996.
- Sacred Fire: Poetry and Prose, illustrated by Frank Howell, Doubleday (New York, NY), 1998.
- We Became as Mountains, Sherman Asher Press (Santa Fe, NM), 2008.

=== Non-fiction and Anthologies ===
- Central City: A Ballad of the West, with photographs by Myron Wood, Chaparral Press (Colorado Springs, CO), 1963.
- Colorado: Big Mountain Country, with photographs by Myron Wood, Doubleday (New York, NY), 1969
- Clearcut: The Deforestation of America, Sierra Club (San Francisco, CA), 1972
- In This Proud Land: America, 1935–1943, New York Graphic Society (New York, NY), 1973.
- The Grass Roots People: An American Requiem, with photographs by Nancy Wood, Harper & Row (New York, NY), 1978.
- When Buffalo Free the Mountains: The Survival of America's Ute Indians, with photographs by Nancy Wood, Doubleday (Garden City, NY), 1980.
- Heartland New Mexico: Photographs from the Farm Administration, 1935–1943, University of New Mexico Press (Albuquerque, NM), 1989.
- Taos Pueblo, with photographs by Nancy Wood, Knopf (New York, NY), 1989.
- The Serpent’s Tongue: Prose, Poetry and Art of the New Mexico Pueblos, Dutton (New York, NY), 1997
- Eye of the West, with photographs by Nancy Wood, University of New Mexico Press (Albuquerque, NM), 2007.

=== Fiction ===
- The Last Five Dollar Baby, Harper & Row (New York, NY) 1972.
- The Man Who Gave Thunder to the Earth: A Taos Way of Seeing and Understanding, Doubleday (Garden City, NY), 1976.
- The King of Liberty Bend, Harper & Row (New York, NY), 1976.
- Thunderwoman: A Mythic Novel of the Pueblos, illustrated by Richard Erdoes, Dutton (New York, NY), 1999.
- The Soledad Crucifixion, University of New Mexico Press (Albuquerque, NM), 2012.

=== Children's Fiction ===
- Little Wrangler, photographs by Myron Wood, Doubleday (Garden City, NY), 1966.
- The Girl Who Loved Coyotes: Stories of the Southwest, illustrated by Diana Bryer, Morrow Junior Books (New York, NY), 1995.
- Old Coyote, illustrated by Max Grafe, Candlewick Press (Cambridge, MA), 2006.
- How the Tiny People Grew Tall: An Original Creation Tale, illustrated by Rebecca Walsh, Candlewick Press (Cambridge, MA), 2005.
- Mr. and Mrs. God in the Creation Kitchen, illustrated by Timothy Basil Ering, Candlewick Press (Cambridge, MA), 2006.

== Awards and honors ==
- Carter G. Woodson Book Award (1980)
- National Endowment for the Arts Fellowship, Poetry (1987)
- Lee Bennett Hopkins Poetry Award (1993)
- International Reading Association Teacher's Choice Award (1993)
- Frank Waters Lifetime Achievement Award (2004)
- Western Writers of America Spur Award (2005)
- Zia Award (2013)
- Independent Publisher Book Awards, Regional Fiction (2013)
