= A Few Red Drops =

2018 book by Claire Hartfield

- Book cover, first edition
- Author: Claire Hartfield
- Publisher: Clarion Books
- Publication date: 2017
- ISBN: 978-0544785137

A Few Red Drops: The Chicago Race Riot of 1919 is a 2017 book by American author Claire Hartfield, published by Clarion Books.

== Synopsis ==
On July 27, 1919, a teenage African-American boy was killed after a white man threw a stone that hit him. The resulting community response led to violence leaving 38 people dead and 537 wounded, and came to be known as the Chicago race riot of 1919. The book explores the complex causes of the Chicago race riot, and documents the events of the riot with photographs and historical documents.

== Reception ==
Author Claire Hartfield won the 2019 Coretta Scott King Author Award for the book. Kirkus Reviews described the book as "A comprehensive, careful account." The Horn Book Magazine praised the book as a "...readable, compelling history..." using "[m]eticulously chosen archival photos, documents, newspaper clippings, and quotes from multiple primary sources..." The book also won the Carter G. Woodson Book Award at the secondary level for 2019.
