= Candacy Taylor =

American photographer and cultural historian

Candacy Taylor is an author, photographer, and an award-winning cultural documentarian. She is the author of Overground Railroad: The Green Book and the Roots of Black Travel in America, which explored the legacy of the Green Book. Overground Railroad made the New York Times' list of notable books of 2020, Oprah Magazine's top 26 travel books, and National Geographic's top 10 list of books by adventurous women. An adaptation of Overground Railroad for young adult readers won the Carter G. Woodson Book Award in 2023.

Taylor has documented the architecture of buildings listed in The Negro Motorist Green Book.

Taylor was a fellow at the Hutchins Center at Harvard University under the direction of Henry Louis Gates Jr. She curated The Negro Motorist Green Book, a 3,500-square-foot exhibition that has toured 13 US museums as part of the Smithsonian Institution Traveling Exhibition Service (SITES) from 2020 to 2025, including the Jimmy Carter Library and Museum.

Her projects have been commissioned, funded, and archived by the Library of Congress, The National Endowment for the Humanities, National Geographic The National Park Service, the National Trust, the Graham Foundation The American Council of Learned Societies, and the Schomburg Center for Research in Black Culture at the New York Public Library. Her work has been featured in dozens of media outlets including The Atlantic, CBS Sunday Morning, The Economist, The Los Angeles Times, The New York Times, The New Yorker, Newsweek, Fortune Magazine, Time Magazine, and Viceland.

She turned her master's degree thesis at the California College of the Arts into Counter Culture: The American Coffee Shop Waitress, that featured women 50 and older who had waitressed for up to 60 years.
