= Latimore Tourist Home =

- U.S. National Register of Historic Places
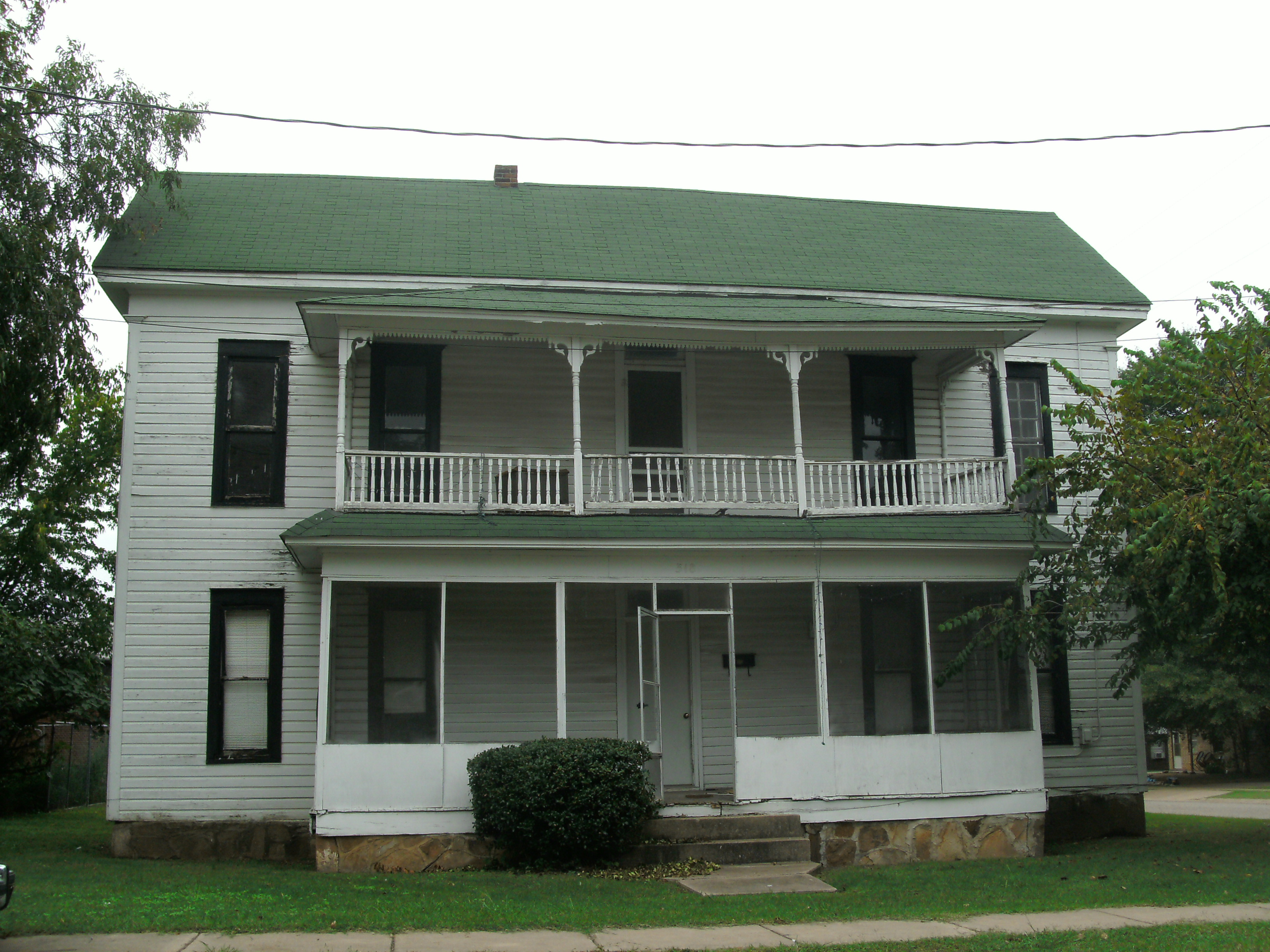
- The home, at its original location

- Location within Arkansas Location within the United States
- Location: S. Houston Ave. and W. 5th St., Russellville, Arkansas
- Coordinates: 35°16′27″N 93°8′25″W
- Area: less than one acre
- NRHP reference No.: 11001049
- Added to NRHP: January 27, 2012

The Latimore Tourist Home is a historic tourist accommodation at South Houston Avenue and West 5th Street in Russellville, Arkansas. It is a two-story wood frame I-house—also referred to as Plantation Plain style—, with a gabled roof, weatherboard siding, and stone foundation. A two-story porch extends across its front facade. Its construction date is uncertain, but before 1913. It was used as an accommodation for traveling African Americans during the 20th century period of racial segregation and Jim Crow laws, and was described in 1949's The Negro Motorist Green Book.

Moved in 2022 to a temporary location from its original location at South Houston Avenue and West 3rd Place, Latimore Tourist Home was moved to its final destination facing West at the corner of Fifth Street and South Houston Avenue on June 28, 2023.

The building was listed on the National Register of Historic Places in 2012.

== See also ==
- National Register of Historic Places listings in Pope County, Arkansas
