= Jack Hadley =

Founder and curator of Jack Hadley Black History Museum

James Roosevelt Hadley
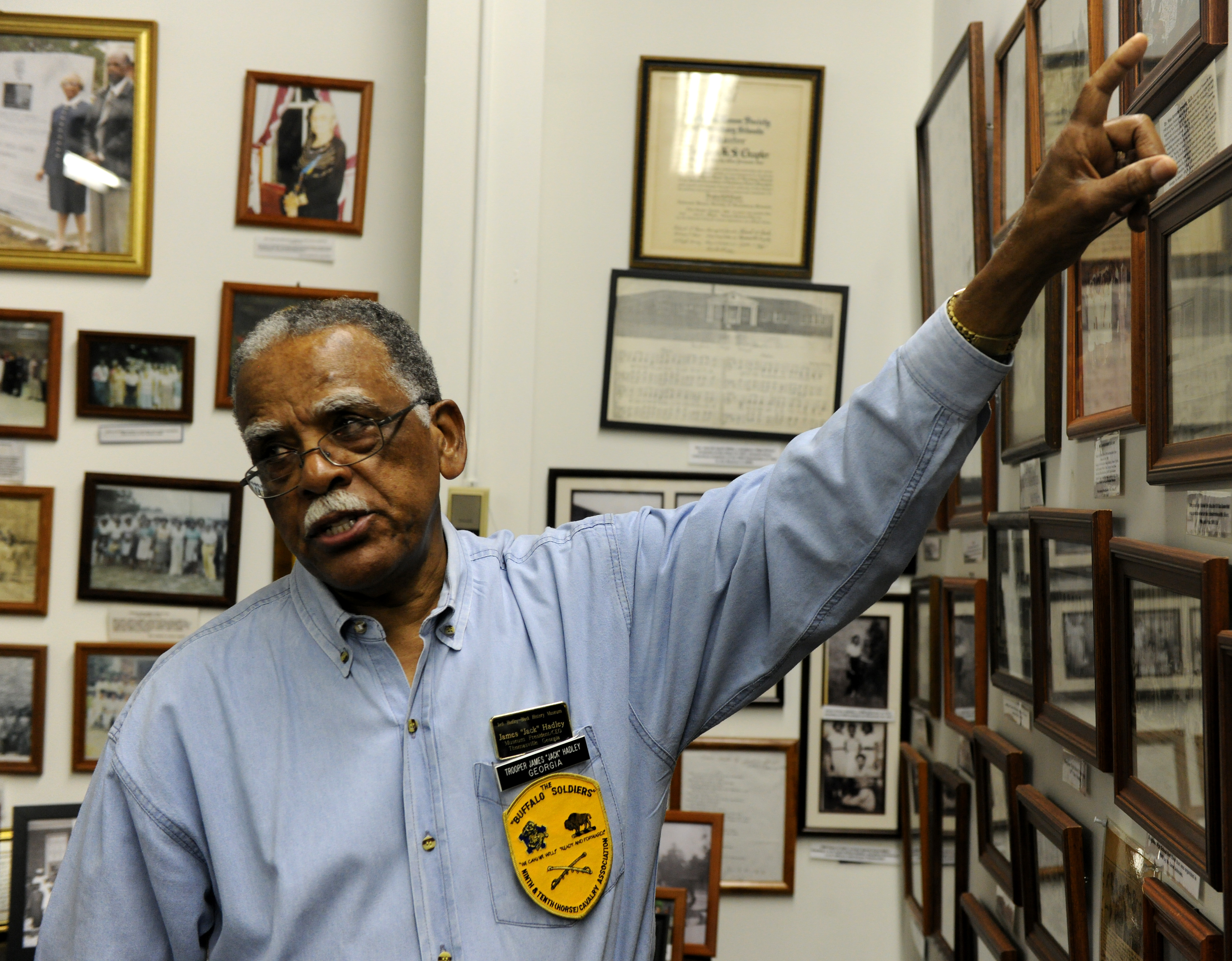
- Jack Hadley gives a tour at the Jack Hadley Black History Museum in 2011
- Born: 1936 (age 89–90); Thomas County, Georgia, USA
- Known for: Founding and curating the Jack Hadley Black History Museum in Thomasville, Georgia
- Children: 3

James Roosevelt Hadley (born 1936) is the founder and curator of the Jack Hadley Black History Museum in Thomasville, Georgia. He formerly served in the United States Air Force.

== Life and career ==
Hadley was born in 1936 and grew up near Thomasville at Pebble Hill, a former cotton plantation in Thomas County, Georgia. At the time of Hadley's birth, Pebble Hill was mainly used for hunting. He was the tenth of 15 children, and is the grandson of a slave who worked at Pebble Hill. His older sister turned 100 years old in October, 2021.

After graduating from high school, he joined the United States Air Force, where he worked with supplies and logistics. He has been married for more than sixty years and has three children. His tenure included postings in Europe, the Middle East and Vietnam. After 28 years he retired with the rank of chief master sergeant. The family moved back to Thomasville and Hadley started working for the United States Postal Service, until his retirement in 1997.

Hadley is a Prince Hall Freemason. In 2018, Thomas University awarded him an honorary bachelor's degree in business administration, in recognition of his work in the Air Force and the community. In February 2020, he was the grand marshal in Thomasville's second annual Black History Month parade and celebration.

== Jack Hadley Black History Museum ==
Museum 2020 logo

Hadley began collecting newspaper clippings on the assassination of Martin Luther King Jr. in 1968, and in the late 1970s, while he was stationed in Germany, he helped his son with a schoolproject about black history. This grew his interest in black history, and he was later invited to participate in Black History Month events in Thomasville. He started collecting memorabilia, which in time became the collection of his museum.

Hadley founded the museum in 1995; in 2006 it opened at its current location, a former school in Thomasville. The museum received grants in 2016 to "provide educational programming for school students in the Thomas County and Thomasville City School systems", and in 2019 it started an education pilot program in cooperation with Thomas County Middle School. In June 2021, the museum was awarded a $240,000 grant from the Institute of Museum and Library Services.

As of 2022, the museum has about 5,000 items. Hadley notes among them a bullhorn that belonged to his grandfather. For 40 years, it was used to signal to the slaves that it was time to start or stop working in the fields.

The museum has had more than 18,000 visitors since 2006, and reported nearly 4,000 visitors in 2018. In 2017, Hadley, his family and the museum were honored in a resolution from the Georgia House of Representatives. Wayne Clough, former Secretary of the Smithsonian, praised the museum after visiting.

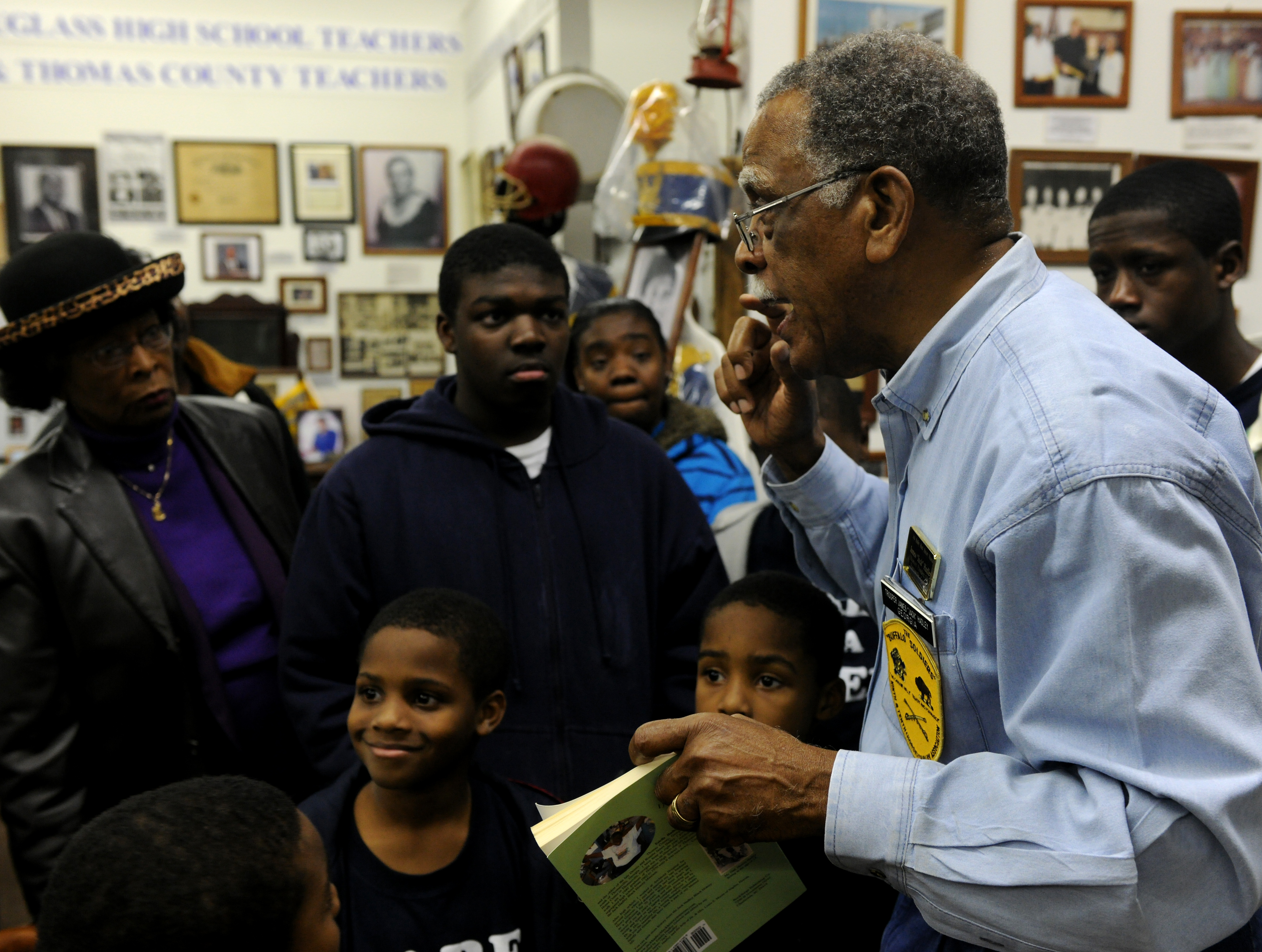
Hadley speaking to museum visitors, 2011

Hadley also created the "Thomasville Black Heritage Trail Tour", a "step-on, step-off" tour which focuses on Henry Ossian Flipper (1856–1940), an American soldier and former slave. The museum successfully advocated the creation of a commemorative postage stamp for Flipper, as well as naming a Thomasville post office after him.

Hadley said in 2022 "The most important piece that makes me feel good is when kids walk through that double doors on the side and use the word 'WOW,' then I know we made a big difference."

As of 2022, the museum's executive director is Daniel Pittman.

=== COVID-19 pandemic ===
In March 2020 the museum closed due to the COVID-19 pandemic. The museum made efforts to provide educational resources virtually, and was granted CARES Act money for this purpose. In September, the museum cooperated with 4 other Thomasville organizations in creating a photo contest for students in Thomas County. The theme of the contest was to document life during the pandemic. It reopened in August, 2021.

== Imperial Hotel ==
The Negro Travelers' Green Book (1959), the Imperial Hotel included on page 16

Following the attention garnered by the 2018 film Green Book, Hadley involved himself in an attempt to restore the Imperial Hotel, a Thomasville building included in The Negro Travelers' Green Book, a travel guide for African-Americans listing places that would not refuse them service. Hadley commented that had he known about the book in the 1960s, it would have been helpful to him, since he often had to drive long distances and at times was turned away because he was black.

The hotel was built in 1949 by African American brick masons, the Lewis brothers. It operated between 1949 and 1969, and was originally owned by Howard Thompson. Until 1969, it was run by Harvey and Dorothy Lewis - Thompson. The hotel was used by traveling African American musicians who entertained African American audiences. Among its guests was singer Aretha Franklin. It had eight guest rooms, communal baths, with a restaurant and a barbershop in the building. After 1969, the building was used as an office by community leader and civil rights activist Curtis T. Thomas. From 2001 and onwards, the building was unused.

By October 2019, over $190,000 had been raised for the restoration. A group of historians led by Hadley have purchased the building, the city's only black-owned hotel. In October 2019, the efforts received recognition from Thomasville Landmarks, a local historical society. Hadley said in 2022 that he hoped the project, which had been slowed by the pandemic, would be finished in five years.

In November 2022, the hotel's restored neon sign was lit for the first time since 1969. The intent is to name the hotel lot the Jack Hadley Yards, and that it shall include the museum, the hotel and a library. Geneva Thompson, widow of Howard Thompson, said that her husband would be proud to see how the hotel still has an impact on the community.

== Bibliography ==
- Hadley, James "Jack"; Brown, Titus (2000). African-American Life on the Southern Hunting Plantation. Arcadia Publishing. ISBN 9780738505558.
