= Claire Hartfield =

American writer (born 1957)

- Born: July 3, 1957 (age 69); Chicago, Illinois, U.S.
- Education: Yale University (BA); University of Chicago (JD)
- Spouse: Phil Harris
- Children: 3
- Writing career
- Language: English
- Years active: 2012–present
- Genres: Picture books, non-fiction
- Notable work: A Few Red Drops: The Chicago Race Riot of 1919
- Notable awards: Coretta Scott King Author Award (2019)
- Website: clairehartfield.com

Claire Hartfield (born July 3, 1957) is an American writer of history-inspired novels, best known for her Coretta Scott King Award-winning non-fiction novel A Few Red Drops: The Chicago Race Riot of 1919.

== Personal life ==
Hartfield was born in Chicago, Illinois, to a white Jewish father and a Black mother and has three sisters.

At 10, she was chosen to dance with the Russian Bolshoi ballet company while they were vising Chicago and later became a member of the Yaledancers in college, the oldest group of ballet dancers at Yale University.

Despite being a writer focusing on historical events now, Hartfield says that she never really enjoyed history class in school, because she found that the texts they read were unrelatable and unapplicable to her life. It wasn't until college, when attended an anti-apartheid rally with her friends and read a book about the life of South African anti-apartheid activist Steve Biko, that she developed an interest in history.

She graduated with a B.A. degree from Yale College and a J.D. degree from the University of Chicago Law School.

Hartfield has three daughters.

== Selected works ==
Hartfield's non-fiction novel A Few Red Drops: The Chicago Race Riot of 1919, tells the story of the 1919 Chicago Race Riots that killed 38 people and wounded 537, two thirds of whom were Black victims.

Hartfield first heard of the Chicago Race Riots through her grandmother, who lived through them and found herself in the middle of the riots at twenty years old when stepping out of her home in summer 1919.

A few years prior to writing the book, she was again reminded of her grandmother's story when she saw the way police were interacting with protestors in the United States and wrote A Few Red Drops with the goal in mind to inspire coming generations to figure out a way to bring about change.

The novel's title was inspired by a line in the Carl Sandburg poem "I Am the People, the Mob," published in 1916, which reads "Sometimes I growl, shake myself and spatter a few red drops for history to remember.” Hartfield encountered the poem well into writing the novel while researching poems from the early 20th century and found that it summed up the message of her story perfectly.

== Bibliography ==
Non-fiction

- A Few Red Drops: The Chicago Race Riot of 1919 (Clarion, 2017)

Picture Books

- Me and Uncle Romie: A Story Inspired by the Life and Art of Romare Beardon, illustrated by Jerome Lagarrigue (Dial Books, 2012)

== Awards ==
Nominee

- 2018 L.A. Times Book Prize for A Few Red Drops: The Chicago Race Riot of 1919

Won

- 2019 Coretta Scott King Author Award for A Few Red Drops: The Chicago Race Riot of 1919
- 2019 Carter G. Woodson Book Award for A Few Red Drops: The Chicago Race Riot of 1919
