= Leon Walter Tillage =

American children's writer (1937–2011)

Leon Walter Tillage (January 19, 1936 – October 5, 2011) was an American whose autobiographical children's book Leon's Story (1997) features the effects of Jim Crow laws in his life in the 1940s – and of the later Civil Rights Movement.

Tillage was a sharecropper's son in small-town North Carolina during the Jim Crow era of racial segregation. He worked as a custodian at Park School of Baltimore for more than 30 years beginning in 1967. Tillage's father got run over by a car and died, which caused his family fall into debt and forced his mother to run the household on her own. Leon's Story is an oral history based on interviews of Tillage by Susan L. Roth, published by Farrar, Straus and Giroux in 1997; it won the Carter G. Woodson Book Award in 1998. but before that he endured many hardships.
