= Brent Ashabranner =

American Peace Corps administrator and writer (1921–2016)

- Born: November 3, 1921; Shawnee, Oklahoma, U.S.
- Died: December 1, 2016 (aged 95); Williamsburg, Virginia, U.S.
- Resting place: Arlington National Cemetery
- Education: Oklahoma A&M
- Spouse: Martha White (m. 1941)
- Children: 2
- Military career
- Branch: United States Navy
- Service years: 1942–1945
- Conflicts: World War II
- Writing career
- Notable awards: ALA Notable Book; 1983 The New Americans: Changing Patterns in U.S. Immigration; 1984 To Live in Two Worlds: American Indian Youth Today; 1984 Gavriel and Jemal: Two Boys of Jerusalem; 1985 Dark Harvest: Migrant Farmworkers in America; 1986 Children of the Maya: A Guatemalan Indian Odyssey; 1987 Into a Strange Land: Unaccompanied Refugee Youth in America; 1988 Always to Remember: The Story of the Vietnam Veterans Memorial Boston Globe–Horn Book Award – Non-fiction Honor Book; 1986 Dark Harvest: Migrant Farmworkers in America Carter G. Woodson Book Award; 1983 Morning Star, Black Sun: The Northern Cheyenne Indians and America's Energy Crisis; 1985 To Live in Two Worlds: American Indian Youth Today; 1986 Dark Harvest: Migrant Farmworkers in America Christopher Award; 1987 Into a Strange Land: Unaccompanied Refugee Youth in America School Library Journal – Best Book of the Year; 1986 Children of the Maya: A Guatemalan Indian Odyssey

Brent Kenneth Ashabranner (November 3, 1921 – December 1, 2016) was an American Peace Corps administrator, including its 1967–69 deputy director, and author of more than 30 books, primarily non-fiction children's literature, which received over 40 awards.

== Early life ==
Ashabranner was born in 1921 in Shawnee, Oklahoma. His family later moved to El Reno and then Bristow due to economic hardship during the Great Depression. An avid reader and writer with interests in foreign countries, track, and tennis, he graduated from high school in 1939.

Ashabranner studied English at Oklahoma A&M, where he discovered influential writers and met his future wife, Martha White. Encouraged by a professor to write pulp Westerns, he earned extra income from fiction and later took a part-time campus job. They married in mid-1941. His brother Gerard, self-taught in law, passed the state bar and became a practicing attorney.

After the U.S. entered World War II, Ashabranner joined the Navy Seabees and served in the Pacific. After the war, he and his wife returned to Oklahoma A&M, earning degrees in English and Home Economics by 1948. Ashabranner completed a master’s in English in 1951, became an English instructor, and they had two daughters in the early 1950s.

== Helping other countries ==
In 1955, Ashabranner was given a chance to work in Africa. With its well-rated agricultural department, Oklahoma A&M was asked by the Truman administration's Point Four Program to help Ethiopia start an agricultural college. The school was in agreement and had for several years sent people for this purpose. Ethiopia later asked for help with creating school books, and Oklahoma A&M was again asked to recruit advisors, one of whom was Ashabranner. The job was for two years, after which he and his family were to return to Stillwater and the English department. Instead, they ended up living in Africa and Asia for 25 years.

=== Ethiopia ===
Ashabranner's job, in national capital Addis Ababa, was to start two magazines modeled after My Weekly Reader and Scholastic Corporation's Junior Scholastic. One magazine would be for Ethiopia's elementary grades and written in Amharic, the national language, and the other would be written in English for later grades. The goal was to teach readers about their country and its history. While Ashabranner struggled with Amharic, his work partner, Russel Davis, learned it much more readily. The two traveled Ethiopia for a month with native counterparts to take in the country's culture. They visited the historic city of Aksum, and various cultural groups including the Amharas, Gallas, Guragies, and Falasha. Ashabranner and Davis used what they learned from this trip, and others like it, to tell educational stories in their magazine articles, and they wrote their first book, The Lion's Whiskers, published in 1959. Ashabranner's wife, Martha, once taught home economics skills at a local girls' school, as well.

=== Libya and Nigeria ===
When their time in Ethiopia was up, the Point Four Program asked Ashabranner to help them in Libya. After much consideration, he resigned from the newly renamed Oklahoma State University and his family went to Libya. Davis returned to the U.S. and became an educator at Harvard University, but they continued to write six more books together. While in Libya, one such book was Ten Thousand Desert Swords in 1960. The family next went to Nigeria, long a colony of Britain and about to receive its independence. While Ashabranner worked there, U.S. President John F. Kennedy created the Peace Corps and its first director, Sargent Shriver, visited Nigeria to see about establishing the program. Ashabranner, at that time part of the United States Agency for International Development, was assigned to escort Shriver, who then appointed Ashabranner in charge of setting up operations after Nigeria agreed to participate. Also while there, Ashabranner became a non-fiction writer, working with Davis on their last and best-selling book together, Land in the Sun: The Story of West Africa (1963).

=== India, America, and Southeast Asia ===
Ashabranner's next assignment was in India, where he was the local director when its Peace Corps program became the largest in the world in 1965. After nearly four years in India, the next Peace Corps director asked Ashabranner to return to America and become the international program's deputy director. He bought a house in a Maryland suburb of Washington, D.C. and his daughters graduated from Walter Johnson High School there. In May 1969, Ashabranner was among the guests invited to the Nixon White House for Joseph Blatchford's swearing-in ceremony as the third Peace Corps director. Ashabranner's daughter Melissa earned degrees from Temple University and Yale, while daughter Jennifer trained professionally in pet grooming and photography. Ashabranner and his wife then returned oversees while he worked with the philanthropic Ford Foundation, moving from the Philippines to Indonesia in 1976.

== Full-time writing ==
In 1980, Ashabranner and his wife returned to America to be near their daughters and devote his full-time work to writing non-fiction books for young readers. Most of his more recent work is illustrated by Paul Conklin, whom Ashabranner first met in Nigeria. Daughter Jennifer also illustrated several of Ashabranner's books, beginning with Always to Remember (1988) about the Vietnam Veterans Memorial. He collaborated with daughter Melissa in Into a Strange Land (1987) and Counting America (1989). Ashabranner won the Carter G. Woodson Award "for the most distinguished books appropriate for young readers that depict ethnicity in the United States" three times (1983, 1985, 1986). In 1988, Ashabranner and his wife moved to Williamsburg, Virginia. While his last book was published in 2002, Ashabranner told his doctor he'd be writing as long as he lived.

== Death and legacy ==
Ashabranner died on December 1, 2016, and was survived by his wife and daughters, three grandchildren, and a great-grandchild.

Author Muriel Miller Branch, who wrote in 2000 about the Gullah people, described Ashabranner as a mentor who first discerned her writing talent.

Ashabranner's wife, Martha, died at age 98 on May 30, 2020.

== Published works ==
=== For children ===
- The Lion's Whiskers (with Russell Davis), Little, Brown (Boston), 1959, and editor, The Lion's Whiskers and Other Ethiopian Tales, revised edition, illustrated by Helen Siegl, Linnet Books (Hamden, Connecticut), 1997. ISBN 978-0208024299
- Point Four Assignment: Stories from the Records of Those Who Work in Foreign Fields for the Mutual Security of Free Nations (with Russell Davis), Little, Brown (Boston), 1959.
- Ten Thousand Desert Swords (with Russell Davis), Little, Brown (Boston), 1960.
- The Choctaw Code (with Russell Davis), McGraw (New York), 1961, reprinted, Linnet Books, 1994. ASIN B000PS5K4S
- Chief Joseph: War Chief of the Nez Percé (with Russell Davis), McGraw (New York), 1962.
- Land in the Sun: The Story of West Africa (with Russell Davis), Little, Brown (Boston), 1963.
- Strangers in Africa (with Russell Davis), McGraw (New York), 1963.
- Morning Star, Black Sun: The Northern Cheyenne Indians and America's Energy Crisis, photographs by Paul Conklin, Dodd (New York), 1982.
- The New Americans: Changing Patterns in U.S. Immigration, Dodd (New York), 1983.
- To Live in Two Worlds: American Indian Youth Today, photographs by Paul Conklin, Dodd (New York), 1984.
- Gavriel and Jemal: Two Boys of Jerusalem, photographs by Paul Conklin, Dodd (New York), 1984.
- Dark Harvest: Migrant Farmworkers in America, photographs by Paul Conklin, Dodd (New York), 1985, reissued, Linnet Books, 1993. ISBN 978-0208023919
- Children of the Maya: A Guatemalan Indian Odyssey, photographs by Paul Conklin, Dodd (New York), 1986. ISBN 978-0396087861
- Into a Strange Land: Unaccompanied Refugee Youth in America (with Melissa Ashabranner), Dodd (New York), 1987. ASIN B0027WNOTS
- The Vanishing Border: A Photographic Journey along Our Frontier with Mexico, photographs by Paul Conklin, Dodd (New York), 1987. ISBN 978-0396089001
- Always to Remember: The Story of the Vietnam Veterans Memorial, photographs by Jennifer Ashabranner, Dodd (New York), 1988. ASIN B01A64M05M
- Born to the Land: An American Portrait, photographs by Paul Conklin, Putnam (New York), 1989. ISBN 0-399-21716-9
- I'm in the Zoo, Too!, illustrated by Janet Stevens, Cobblehill Books (New York), 1989. ISBN 978-0525650027
- Counting America: The Story of the United States Census (with Melissa Ashabranner), Putnam (New York), 1989. ISBN 978-0399217470
- People Who Make a Difference, photographs by Paul Conklin, Cobblehill Books (New York), 1989. ISBN 978-0525650096
- A Grateful Nation: The Story of Arlington National Cemetery, photographs by Jennifer Ashabranner, Putnam (New York), 1990. ISBN 978-0399221880
- The Times of My Life: A Memoir, Dutton (New York), 1990. ISBN 978-0525650478
- Crazy about German Shepherds, photographs by Jennifer Ashabranner, Dutton (New York), 1990. ISBN 978-0525650324
- An Ancient Heritage: The Arab-American Minority, photographs by Paul Conklin, Harper (New York), 1991. ISBN 978-0060200480
- Land of Yesterday, Land of Tomorrow: Discovering Chinese Central Asia, photographs by Paul, David, and Peter Conklin, Cobblehill Books (New York), 1992. ISBN 0-525-65086-5
- A Memorial for Mr. Lincoln, photographs by Jennifer Ashabranner, Putnam (New York), 1992. ISBN 0-399-22273-1
- Still a Nation of Immigrants, photographs by Jennifer Ashabranner, Dutton (New York), 1993. ISBN 978-0525651307
- A New Frontier: The Peace Corps in Eastern Europe, photographs by Peter Conklin, Dutton (New York), 1994. ISBN 978-0525651550
- Lithuania: The Nation That Would Be Free (with Stephen Chicoine), photographs by Stephen Chicoine, Cobblehill Books (New York), 1996. ISBN 978-0525651512
- Our Beckoning Borders: Illegal Immigration to America, photographs by Peter Conklin, Cobblehill Books (New York), 1996. ISBN 978-0525652236
- A Strange and Distant Shore: Indians of the Great Plains in Exile, Dutton (New York, NY), 1996. ISBN 978-0525652014
- To Seek a Better World: The Haitian Minority in America, photographs by Peter Conklin, Cobblehill Books (New York), 1997. ISBN 978-0525652199
- Their Names to Live: What the Vietnam Veterans Memorial Means to America, photographs by Jennifer Ashabranner, Twenty-first Century Books (New York), 1998. ISBN 978-0761332350
- The New African Americans, photographs by Jennifer Ashabranner, Linnet Books (Hamden, Connecticut), 1999. ISBN 978-0208024206
- Badge of Valor: The National Law Enforcement Officers Memorial, photographs by Jennifer Ashabranner, Twenty-first Century Books (New York), 2000. ISBN 978-0761315223
- A Date with Destiny: The Women in Military Service for America Memorial, photographs by Jennifer Ashabranner, Twenty-first Century Books (New York), 2000. ISBN 978-0585355603
- No Better Hope: What the Lincoln Memorial Means to America, photographs by Jennifer Ashabranner, Twenty-first Century Books (New York), 2001. ISBN 978-0761315230
- Remembering Korea: The Korean War Veterans Memorial, photographs by Jennifer Ashabranner, Twenty-first Century Books (New York), 2001. ISBN 978-0761321569
- On the Mall in Washington, D.C.: A Visit to America's Front Yard, photographs by Jennifer Ashabranner, Twenty-first Century Books (New York), 2002. ISBN 978-0761316954
- The Washington Monument: A Beacon for America, photographs by Jennifer Ashabranner, Twenty-first Century Books (New York), 2002. ISBN 978-0761315247

=== Other ===
- The Stakes Are High (editor), Bantam (New York), 1954.
- A First Course in College English (textbook, with Judson Milburn and Cecil B. Williams), Houghton (Boston), 1962.
- A Moment in History: The First Ten Years of the Peace Corps, Doubleday (New York), 1971.
