= Jesse C. Jackson =

American novelist (1908–1983)

Jesse Jackson (1908–1983) was an African-American novelist.

== Life ==
Jackson was born in Columbus, Ohio, in 1908. As the only African-American family on the west side of town, his family enjoyed a middle-class lifestyle until they lost their home in the 1913 flooding of the Scioto River, and were taken in by an elderly acquaintance in the poorer east side of town.

In Honey for a Child's Heart, a book on the role of literature in a family's life, Gladys M. Hunt writes:

"No one has yet sat down and devised a set of rules that magically produces a great story. The quality that we have talked about has to come from the quality inside the person writing the story. In 1945 Jesse Jackson wrote Call Me Charley, the story of the only black boy in a white school. Mr. Jackson did not write primarily to deliver a message on race relations. He simply wrote a book out of his own experience. It had the ring of reality, and twenty years later the book’s editor would hear a woman tell how she had read a book in the fifth grade that changed her life, her whole attitude about people. The book was Call Me Charley."

In 1975, Jackson won the Carter G. Woodson Book Award for Make a Joyful Noise Unto the Lord: The Life of Mahalia Jackson, Queen of the Gospel Singers.

== Works ==
=== Young adult fiction ===
- Call Me Charley. Illus. Doris Spiegel. New York: Harper, 1945.
- Anchor Man. Illus, Doris Spiegel. New York: Harper, 1945.
- Room for Randy. Illus. Frank Nichols. New York: Friendship Press, 1957.
- Charley Starts from Scratch. New York: Harper, 1958.
- Tessie. Illus. Harold James. New York: Harper, 1968.
- The Sickest Don't Always Die the Quickest. New York: Doubleday, 1971.
- The Fourteenth Cadillac. New York: Doubleday, 1972.

=== Other ===
- (with Elaine Landau) Black in America. New York: Messner, 1973.
- Make a Joyful Noise unto the Lord: The Life of Mahalia Jackson. New York: Crowell, 1974.
