= The Flytrap =

The Flytrap Media is a feminist worker-owned media company with a newsletter called The Flytrap founded by ten writers in October 2024.

== History ==
The Flytrap was announced with a Kickstarter in October 2024 as an "intersectional feminist media co-op" founded by a group of writers and artists: Andrea Grimes, Nicole Froio, Aria Velazquez, Christine Grimaldi, Chrissy Stroop, Evette Dionne, Katelyn Burns, Rommy Torrico, s.e. smith, and Tina Vásquez. After the brief closure of Jezebel, Grimes reached out to several others with the idea to create a cooperative blog. The founders sought to create a digital space for feminist conversation in the wake of the closure of outlets such as Bitch and The Toast. The collective is named after the Venus flytrap because they "adapted to survive in nitrogen-poor soil by evolving the ability to eat bugs." The Flytrap produces a weekly newsletter and the cancel culture-focused podcast Cancel Me, Daddy that was already hosted by Burns and Grimaldi. The company explicitly rejects Substack and the use of A.I. The Flytrap newsletter launched on Election Day in November 2024 after the Kickstarter raised approximately $57,000.
