= Special Protocol Service Section =

The Special Protocol Service Section (SPSS) was an organization, within the Department of State, tasked with mitigating the effects of racism towards visiting African diplomats in the United States. Formed by the Kennedy administration in March 1961, the SPSS was primarily concerned with providing housing (and subsequent safe transit) for resident dignitaries.

== Background ==
Due to the increasing amount of African states proclaiming independence in the 1960s, many new ambassadorial and consular positions were being assigned to Washington, concurrent with the peaked tensions of the Civil Rights movement. Outside of the capital, these dignitaries faced intense harassment and discrimination. Because of this, the SPSS would go on to work closely with the Bureau of Diplomatic Security; a small team of 10 special agents were assigned to the section, who logged 4,000 hours of unpaid overtime in 1962.

The section was led by Pedro Sanjuan, a Cuban-American staffer. Under Sanjuan, the SPSS indexed and monitored the housing situation, eventually publishing a forty page report on the topic. In April of 1961 it was found that of 211 prospective apartment buildings in the D.C. area, only 8 would allow African diplomats to become tenants.
