= African American resorts =

Segregated resorts in the United States

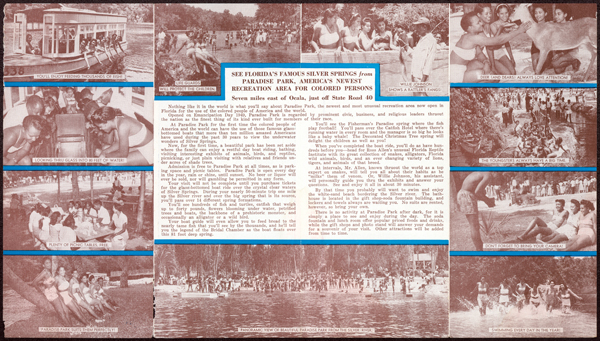
Promotional flyer for Paradise Park, Florida

During the decades of segregation in the United States, African Americans established various resorts. The resorts were self-contained commercial establishments. Varying resort accommodations included rooms for rent, meals and fine food, cocktail bars, dancing, sporting facilities (such as golf, horseback riding, tennis, swimming pools, fishing, badminton), and beaches. Entire communities (or towns) became resort areas for African Americans. The Negro Motorist Green Book helped guide African Americans to accommodating and safe places, including Idlewild, Michigan, which was among the most well known.

== California ==
- Bay Street Beach (also known as "the Inkwell") in Santa Monica, California
- Bruce's Beach in Manhattan Beach, California
- Eureka Villa (now Val Verde) in California
- Lake Shore Beach Club on Lake Elsinore in Riverside County, California
- Murray's Dude Ranch in Apple Valley, California
- Pacific Beach Club in Orange County, California
- Peck's Pier and Pavilion in Manhattan Beach, California

== Colorado ==
- Lincoln Hills Country Club in Gilpin County, Colorado
- Winks Panorama (or Winks Lodge), Lincoln Hills, Colorado

== Florida ==
- American Beach, Florida
- Bethune Beach, Florida
- Bruce Beach in Pensacola, Florida
- Butler Beach in St. Johns County, Florida
- Hampton House in Miami, Florida
- Manhattan Beach (now Hanna Park) in Jacksonville, Florida
- Paradise Park, Florida
- Virginia Key Beach in Virginia Key, Florida

== Indiana ==
- Fox Lake in Angola, Indiana

== Maine ==
- Jewell Inn in York Beach, Maine
- Rock Rest in Kittery, Maine

== Maryland ==
- Arundel on the Bay, Maryland
- Carr's Beach in Anne Arundel County, Maryland
- Highland Beach, Maryland
- Sparrow's Beach, south of Annapolis, Maryland

== Massachusetts ==
- Camp Twin in Kingston, Massachusetts
- Jones' Cottage in Hyannis, Massachusetts
- Kingston Inn in Kingston, Massachusetts
- Oak Bluffs in Martha's Vineyard, Massachusetts (also referred to as The Inkwell)
  - Dunmere-by-the-sea in Oak Bluffs, Massachusetts
  - Shearer Cottage in Oak Bluffs, Massachusetts
- The Roost in Osterville, Massachusetts
- The Wigwam in Mashpee, Massachusetts

== Michigan ==
- Blue-Bird Motel in Covert, Michigan
- Brooks Castle Farm in Grand Junction, Michigan
- Glover's Chi-Acres in Paw Paw, Michigan
- Idlewild, Michigan
  - Dulin's Motel in Idlewild, Michigan
  - Lydia Inn in Idlewild, Michigan
- Pitchford's La Maison in Covert, Michigan
- The Linwood Hotel in Detroit, Michigan

== Mississippi ==
- Gulfside Assembly in Waveland, Mississippi

== New Jersey ==
- Beach 3 in Long Branch, New Jersey
- Missouri Avenue Beach in Atlantic City
- Chicken Bone Beach in Atlantic City, New Jersey
- Liberty Hotel in Atlantic City, New Jersey
- Park Plaza Motel in Atlantic City, New Jersey
- Efra Court Motel in Wildwood, New Jersey
- Harmon Motel in Wildwood, New Jersey
- Rose Marie Manor in Wildwood, New Jersey

== New York (state) ==
- Coleman's Lodge in Bloomingburg, New York
- Eastville in Sag Harbor, New York
- Greenwood Forest Farms (also known as "The Colony") near Greenwood Lake in New York
- Kings Lodge in Otisville, New York
- Maple Valley Farm in Pine Bush, New York
- Morgan Hill Lodge in Kingston, New York
- Paradise Farm in Cuddebackville, New York
- Peg Leg Bates Resort in Kerhonkson, New York
- Rainbow Acres in Kerhonkson, New York
- Sag Harbor Hills, Azurest, and Ninevah Beach Subdivisions Historic District in Sag Harbor, New York
- Smith Haven in Pine Bush, New York
- Utopia Lodge in Greenfield Park, New York

== North Carolina ==
- Freeman Beach (now Freeman Park) in North Carolina
- Shell Island, North Carolina

== Pennsylvania ==
- Hillside Inn in East Stroudsburg, Pennsylvania

== South Carolina ==
- Atlantic Beach, South Carolina in South Carolina
- Mosquito Beach, now part of Mosquito Beach Historic District, in South Carolina

== Virginia ==
- Bay Shore Beach (now Buckroe and Fort Monroe) in Virginia
- Mark Haven Beach Hotel in Tappahannock, Virginia
- Buckroe Beach near Hampton, Virginia

== Washington, D.C. ==
- Hains Point with Langston Golf Course in East Potomac Park

== West Virginia ==
- Hill Top House Hotel in Harpers Ferry, West Virginia

== Wisconsin ==
- Al's Silver Ridge Resort in Webster, Wisconsin
- Goplana in Wisconsin Dells, Wisconsin
- Lazy M Ranch in Wisconsin Dells, Wisconsin
- Lake Ivanhoe, Wisconsin

== See also ==
- Black-owned businesses
- Chitlin' Circuit
- Index of articles related to African Americans
- List of African-American neighborhoods
- List of African American hotels, motels, and boarding houses
- Racial segregation in the United States
- Reservation of Separate Amenities Act, 1953 in South Africa
