= List of African American hotels, motels, and boarding houses =

African American hotels, motels, and boarding houses were founded during segregation in the United States, offering separate lodging and boarding facilities for African Americans. The Green Book (1936–1966) was a guidebook for African American travelers and included hotel, motel, and boarding house listings where they could stay.

== Alabama ==
- A.G. Gaston Motel in Birmingham, Alabama
- Dunbar Hotel in Birmingham, Alabama; in the Fourth Avenue Business District
- Hotel Ben Moore in Montgomery, Alabama
- Holiday Inn in Tuskegee, Alabama

== California ==
- American Hotel in Los Angeles, California
- Booker T. Washington Hotel (formerly Hotel Edison) in San Francisco, California
- Buford Hotel in Western Addition, San Francisco, California
- California Hotel in Oakland, California
- Douglas Hotel in San Diego, California
- Dunbar Hotel in Los Angeles, California
- Powell Hotel in the Financial District, San Francisco, California
- Pullman Hotel at 236 Townsend Street in SoMA, San Francisco, California
- Madame C.J. Walker Home for Girls and Women in San Francisco, California; in the Lower Pacific Heights
- Scaggs Hotel in Western Addition, San Francisco, California

== Colorado ==
- Rossonian Hotel in Denver, Colorado
- Winks Panorama near Pinecliffe, Colorado

== Florida ==
- Dunbar Hotel in Gainesville, Florida
- Georgette's Tea Room House in Miami, Florida
- Colson Hotel in Sarasota, Florida
- Mary Elizabeth Hotel in Overtown, Miami, Florida; owned by William B. Sawyer
- Hampton House in Miami, Florida
- Jackson Rooming House in Tampa, Florida
- Rogers Hotel in Central Avenue in Tampa
- Lewis Colson's Colson Hotel at 1428 Eighth Street in Overtown, Sarasota, Florida
- LaFrance Hotel in Delray Beach, Florida
- Ward Rooming House in Overtown, Miami, Florida

== Illinois ==
- DuSable Hotel in Chicago, Illinois; likely named for Jean Baptiste Point du Sable
- Pershing Hotel in Chicago, Illinois

== Kentucky ==
- Hotel Metropolitan in Paducah, Kentucky
- Hotel Southern Queen in Bowling Green, Kentucky

== Michigan ==
- Gotham Hotel (Detroit, Michigan) in Detroit, Michigan

== Mississippi ==
- E. F. Young Hotel in Meridian, Mississippi owned by E. F. Young Jr.
- Queen City Hotel (Mississippi) in Columbus, Mississippi
- Riverside Hotel in Clarksdale, Mississippi
- Summers Hotel and Subway Lounge in Jackson, Mississippi

== Missouri ==
- Douglas Hotel in St. Louis, Missouri
- Streets Hotel in Kansas City, Missouri

== New York ==
- Marshall Hotel (New York City) in New York City, New York
- Hotel Theresa in Harlem, New York City, New York

== North Carolina ==
- Greensbook Hotel in Greensboro, North Carolina
- Magnolia House in Greensboro, North Carolina
- Rhone Hotel in New Bern, North Carolina

== Ohio ==
- Edgemont Inn in Cincinnati, Ohio
- Manse Hotel in Cincinnati, Ohio
- Majestic Hotel (Cleveland, Ohio) in Cleveland, Ohio
- Collingwood Motel in Toledo, Ohio

== Oklahoma ==
- Gurley Hotel in Tulsa, Oklahoma; owned by Ottawa W. Gurley
- Stradford Hotel in Tulsa, Oklahoma
- Littlepage Hotel in Deep Deuce, Oklahoma City, Oklahoma

== South Carolina ==
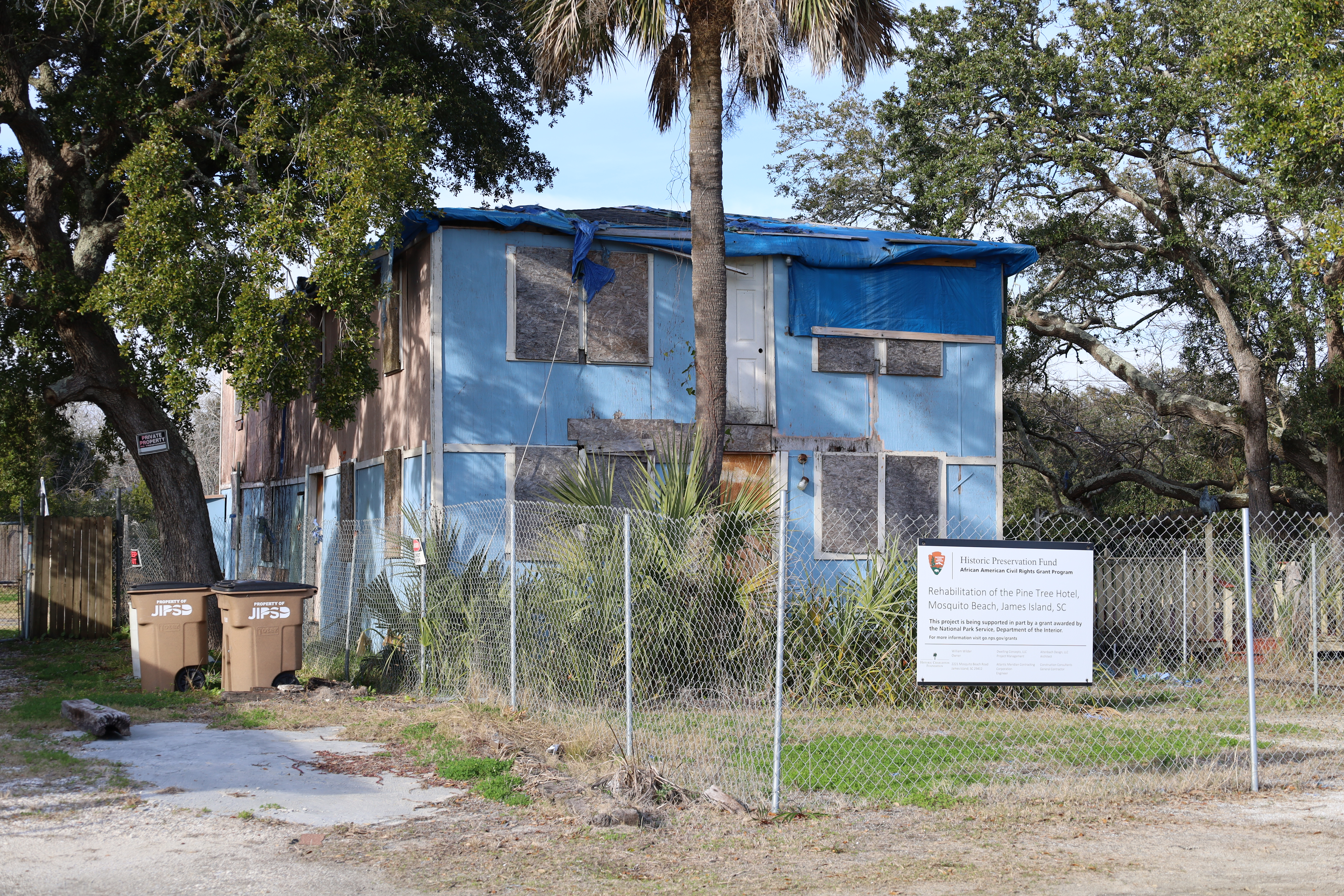
Pine Tree Hotel in Mosquito Beach, South Carolina undergoing renovations in 2021

- Ebony Guest House, Florence, South Carolina
- Pine Tree Hotel in Mosquito Beach, South Carolina
- James Hotel (or St. James Hotel), in Charleston, South Carolina

== Tennessee ==
- Lorraine Motel in Memphis, Tennessee
- Mitchell Hotel in Memphis, Tennessee

== Virginia ==
- Hotel Dumas in Roanoke, Virginia
- Eggleston Hotel in Jackson Ward, Richmond, Virginia

== Washington, D.C. ==
- Wormley Hotel in Washington, D.C.
- Shakespeare House in Washington, D.C. (Grace Nail Johnson was part of the family)

== Wisconsin ==
- Dietz home, or Casablanca Hotel in Milwaukee, Wisconsin

== Other areas ==
- Cowart's Tourist Home; Statesboro, Georgia
- Phyllis Wheatley Settlement House in Minneapolis, Minnesota; named for Phillis Wheatley
- Golden West Hotel in Portland, Oregon
- Douglass Hotel in Macon, Georgia
- Hotel Lincoln in Baton Rouge, Louisiana
- Powell Hotel in Dallas, Texas
- Hill Top House Hotel in Harpers Ferry, West Virginia; African American owned hotel

== See also ==
- African American resorts
- African American businesses
- Chitlin' circuit
