= Frank B. Butler =

American businessman (1885 – 1973)

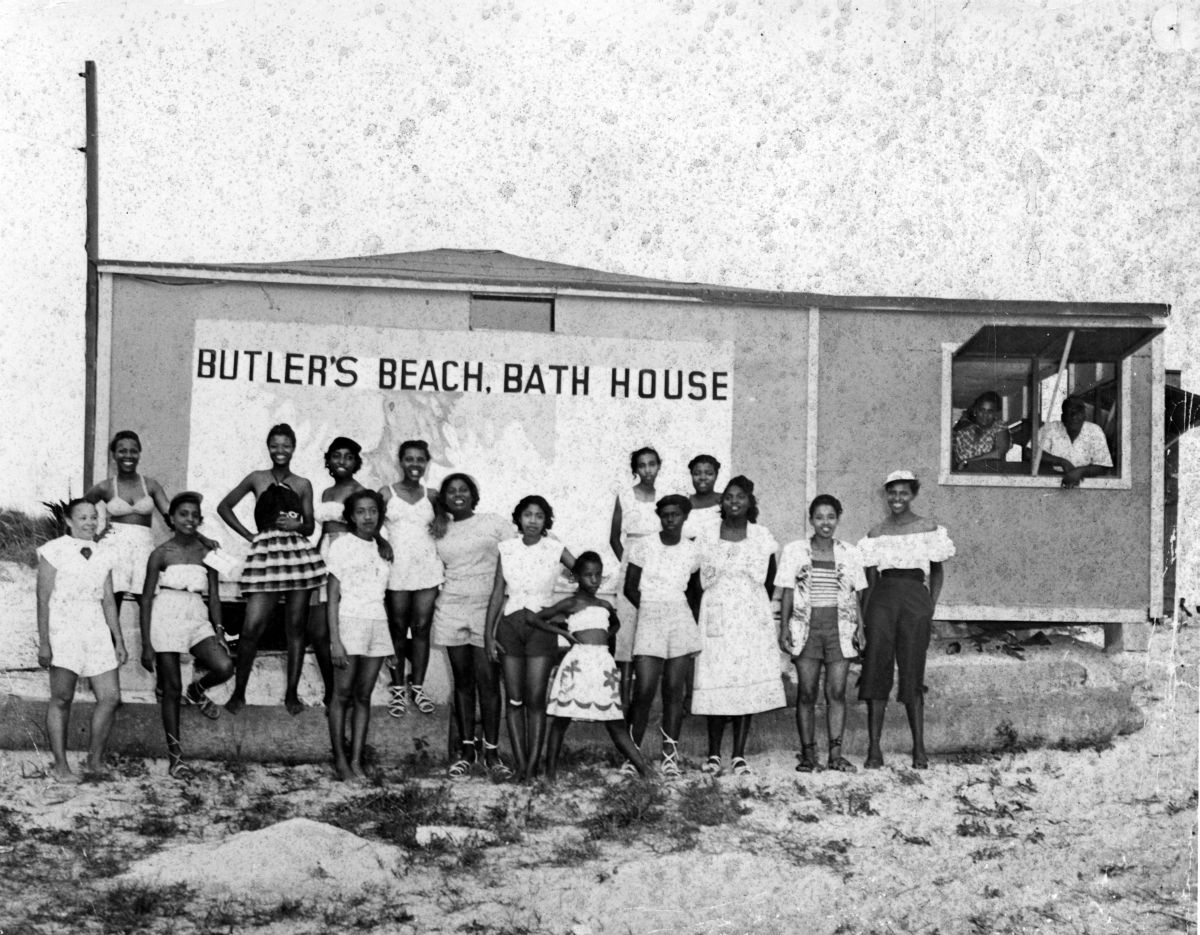
Beach-goers assembled for a group portrait by the bath house at Butler Beach

Frank Bertran Butler (1885–1973) was an American businessman who established a beach resort for African Americans in northeast Florida during the segregation era. He worked in Fernandina Beach, St. Augustine, and then St. Augustine's Lincolnville neighborhood where he established his own market as well as a real estate business. He acquired land on Anastasia Island stretching between the Atlantic Ocean and the Matanzas River on which he established a beach area resort open to African Americans. The Tampa Times reported it to be the only beach open to them between the Jacksonville area and Daytona Beach during segregation. It became known as Butler Beach. The unincorporated community and a park in it are named for him.

== Early life ==
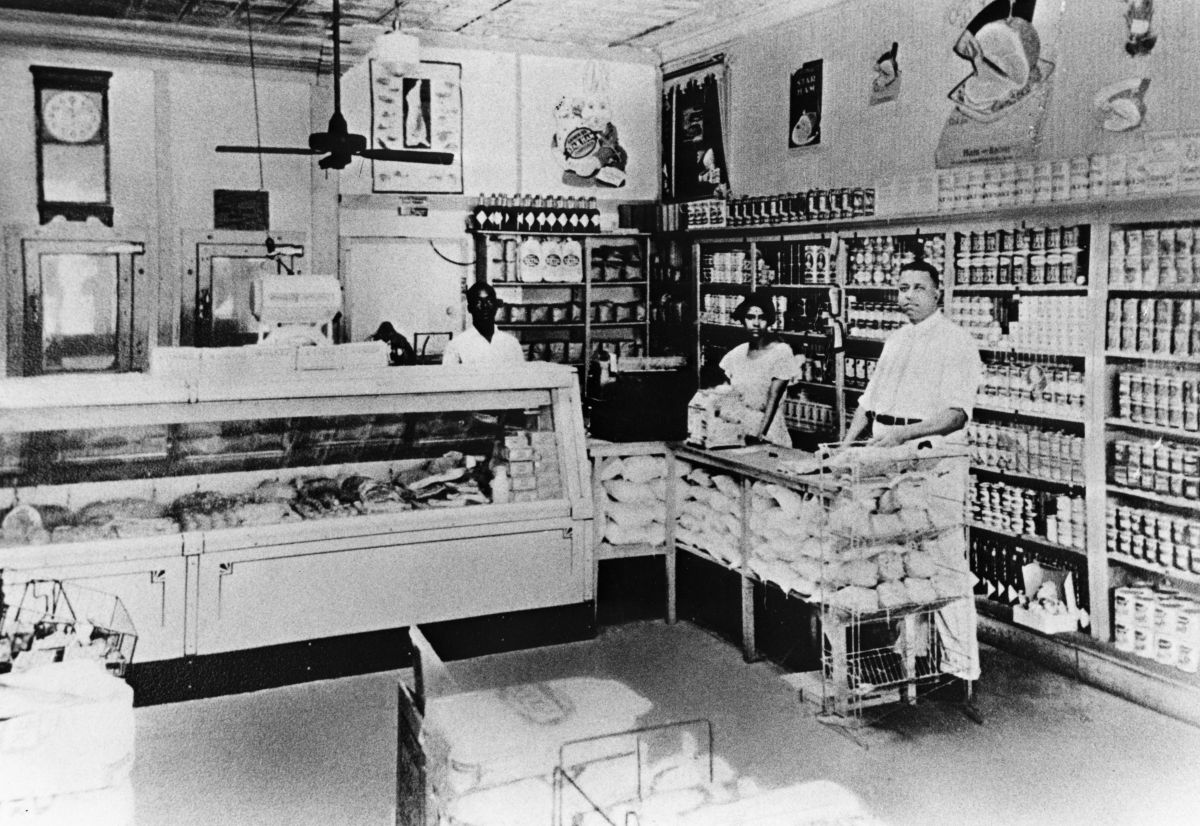
Interior view of the Palace Market at Lincolnville circa 1930, with Frank B. Butler standing on the right

Frank Butler was born on August 4, 1885, in Du Pont, Georgia, the seat of Clinch County, to his African-American parents, Mary Griffin Butler, who ran a restaurant that catered to the crews of the trains that stopped in the town, and Frank Butler, Sr., a fisherman. Butler had four siblings.

Butler married Mamie Davis and had a daughter, Minnie Mae, by the time he was seventeen years old in 1902. There were no good jobs to be found in Du Pont, so he went to Fernandina Beach, Florida, to get work that same year. Because his wife was in poor health, she did not go with him, and soon died. In the seaport town of Fernandina, Butler first worked as a bartender at a bar owned by Solicito Salvador, a Sicilian immigrant who later moved to St. Augustine and opened a fish market. Butler followed him and worked in the fish market, and as a butcher in Snyder's Market.

In 1914 Butler opened the Palace Market in Lincolnville next to his home at 87 Washington Street, with assistance from Solomon Snyder. Selling grocery items such as butchered meat, flour, milk, and sugar, and giving out tokens for discounts on merchandise, he had primarily black customers, with some white clientele. The market was a success.

== Business activities in Lincolnville ==
Washington Street was in the heart of Lincolnville, the black community that had developed after the American Civil War on the western banks of Maria Sanchez Creek and its marshlands. People settled the area and built houses, churches, as well as commercial and fraternal society buildings. Some black men became ministers or ran small businesses, but most African Americans worked as domestic help or as common laborers. In the 1870s and 1880s, during the Reconstruction era, several black men were elected to political office in St. Augustine as town marshal, tax collector and justice of the peace, but after the turn of the century African American political activity was much reduced by the imposition of poll taxes and restrictive voting laws.

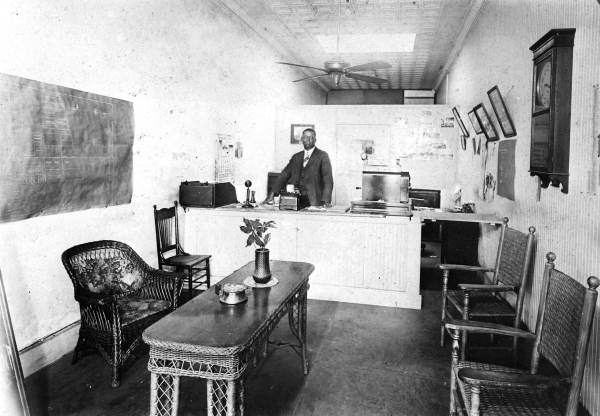
Frank B. Butler in his Lincolnville real estate office

Butler also rented the building at 54 1/2 Washington Street, at the southwest corner of Bridge Street, for his new real estate business. Beginning in 1915 he bought several lots in the Lincolnville neighborhood as business investments. By 1923 he was buying real estate in other areas, especially west of St. Augustine in the section he developed as the College Park subdivision, where numerous African Americans built their houses. Thus Butler got into the real estate business during the Florida land boom of the 1920s when undeveloped land was becoming valuable, but Jim Crow laws were still in effect in the state, as in the rest of the American South. Many land deeds sold by other realtors in St. Augustine included the clause, "not to be sold to persons of Negro blood". An amiable man, Butler was friends with some of the city's white leaders, who informed him of tax sales and other opportunities to buy land at a cheap price.

In 1918 the Florida Baptist Academy had moved from Jacksonville to the western edge of St. Augustine and was renamed Florida Normal and Industrial Institute. The school and its president, Dr. Nathan W. Collier, stressed the teachings of the educator Booker T. Washington, who called for black progress through education and entrepreneurship, rather than trying to directly challenge Jim Crow segregation and the disenfranchisement of black voters in the South. Speakers from other cities often visited the institute and stimulated an awareness in the community of black history and human potential. The school's name was later changed to Florida Memorial College.

== Career as a developer ==
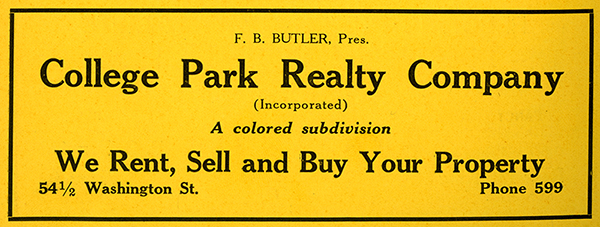
Advertisement for College Park Realty Company, 1934 in St. Augustine, Florida

Washington Street was the center of Lincolnville's social life as well. Butler served as president of the Colored Business and Professional Men's League, which met monthly and produced a directory of black businesses in Lincolnville in the early 1920s. In 1925 Butler and several other men joined to form the College Park Realty Company, Inc., of which he was also president. In October of that year Butler and his second wife Minnie Elizabeth, along with several other investors, including a white physician who saw white and black patients in Lincolnville, transferred their various properties to the company to form the College Park subdivision. The organization became "one of the most lucrative real estate businesses involving property in the western section of St. Augustine, outside the city limits, during the 1920s", according to local historian David Nolan.

In 1927, Butler began buying Edgar F. Pomar's undeveloped land between the Atlantic Ocean and the Matanzas River, about eight miles southeast of St. Augustine on Anastasia Island. Gradually he developed this land into "Butler's Beach" as a resort area for African Americans, the only one between Jacksonville and Daytona Beach. Some prominent whites, such as attorney Frank Upchurch, realtor Frank E. Hale, and County Commissioner Dan Mickler, helped Butler obtain credit and develop the land so that African Americans in the county could have a beach to enjoy. On July 22, 1927, Edgar Pomar sold Butler around 8.4 acres stretching from the ocean to the Matanzas River, and a strip of about 38 acres from the ocean to the river to the Ancient City Beach Company. This new company was a partnership with D. D. Powell of Jacksonville as president and Frank Butler as secretary. Other investors were involved who each bought an interest; Butler bought a one-seventh interest, and it is likely the others did as well; he eventually bought them all out.

Developing this land was difficult, since it was nearly impassable with sand and swamps. On August 10, 1927 the St. Augustine Record reported that Edgar Pomar's request to the county for help with a road to reach the property was turned down by the county commission after white constituents owning property in the area opposed it. They asked the commission to deny any application that might lessen the value of their beach property by making it possible for an African American resort and dance hall to be built nearby. Not until 1931 was a gravel road, the forerunner of State Road A1A, finally built.

In 1933, outings to the beach for surf bathing and beach sports were advertised in a local black newspaper, The St. Augustine Post–The Colored Weekly; hourly round-trip rides in buses and cars cost 24 cents. On July 5, 1937, Butler announced the grand opening of his "Sea Breeze Kaseno–the New Colored Recreation Center" at Butler's Beach.

According to the Butler family, the problems he encountered in trying to develop his land caused Frank Butler to go into politics, so that he could have a voice in local political decisions. He worked to get people to register and vote, and whites and blacks alike voted in his store at several poll booths. He was on the county Republican Executive Committee for more than twelve years, but joined the Democratic Party in 1947, after the U. S. Supreme Court decision in 1944 that African Americans must be allowed to participate in the Democratic Party and vote in its primary elections.

Through a series of real estate transactions over the course of a decade, Butler was eventually able to purchase the remainder of Pomar's land with the aid of realtor Frank E. Hale and Frank Upchurch, Sr. Upchurch held the mortgage on the property until 1949 so that the land could be deeded to the College Park Realty Company in October 1942—creating a strip fifteen hundred feet deep from the ocean to the river, with the mortgage satisfied in 1949.

In 1946 Butler advertised his College Park Subdivision west of St. Augustine and his resort at Butler's Beach. He had improved the part of the beach property along the Matanzas River, providing access to its waters for boating and fishing, and space for picnics and cookouts on the waterfront. He built a pavilion there that had portable electricity and music, and offered refreshments, including beer and fried fish. He also had a concession stand selling hamburgers and shrimp at the corner of Highway A1A and the future Mary Street.

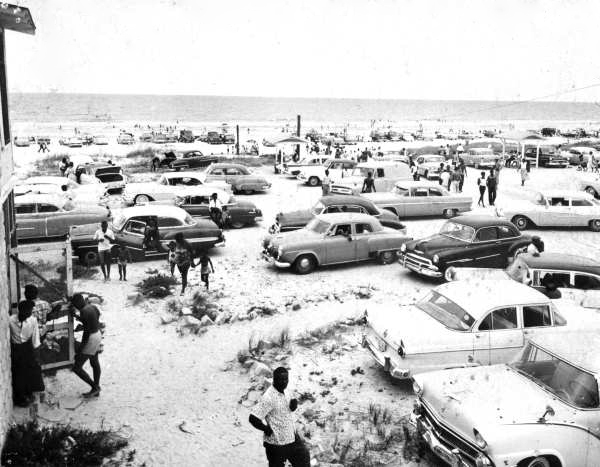
Cars pack the parking area at Butler Beach

Beginning around 1948, after his property had been re-platted in 1947, black people from St. Augustine, Jacksonville, Georgia, and elsewhere purchased his lots in the area near the ocean and built homes. The streets in the neighborhood were named after members of Butler's family: Mary Street (for his mother), Minnie Street (for his wife and daughter), Mae Street (for his daughter, Minnie Mae), Rudolph Avenue (for his grandson), and Gloria Avenue (for his granddaughter).

Frank Butler built Butler's Beach Inn in the northern section, with fourteen upstairs rooms for rent and eventually eight motel units. His daughter Minnie Mae Edwards said there were once eleven black-owned businesses at Butler's Beach. Lonnie McGee had a small cafe with a jukebox and six motel units, and Rosa McGee operated an ice cream parlor. A Mr. Russ had an eleven-room rooming house and a cafe on the corner of A1A and Riverside Drive. Mattie Williams built and ran the Buzz-Buzz cafe. Butler had some houses moved from another location to the beach neighborhood for people to rent or buy. The high sand dunes in the area had not yet formed, and there was camping on the beachside, where students from the Florida Normal and Industrial College had parties.

== Frank B. Butler State Park ==
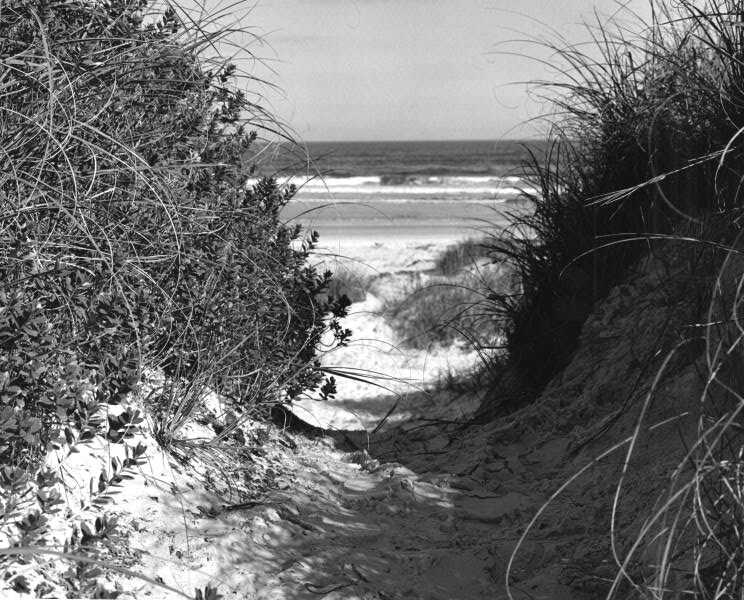
Path to the beach cut through the sand dunes at Frank B. Butler State Park, c. 1960

In 1958, Butler's College Park Realty Company sold the southern part of his land, about half of the total, to the State of Florida for use as a state park. This included acreage from the ocean beach area south of his community of small homes and businesses westward to the Matanzas river. Minnie Mae Edwards said that the state had expressed an interest in acquiring a piece of property to provide a park for African Americans.

The same year Butler was appointed to the Frank B. Butler State Advisory Council by the Florida Board of Parks and Historic Memorials and elected as its chairman by the council. He served on the council until it was disbanded in 1971. In 1962, the Florida Park Service approved $10,000 to develop a parking area at the park. In 1963, Butler donated four and a half more acres by the Matanzas River to the State of Florida to create a recreation area for children, making a total of fifty-three acres in the park, with about seven hundred feet of frontage on the Matanzas River and three hundred feet fronting the ocean. Frank Upchurch, Sr., who was a member of the Florida Board of Parks and Historic Monuments, State Senator Verle Pope, and other persons helped lobby for improving the park facilities. In 1965 Butler advertised his Butler's Beach Inn and Motel, and the nearby state park, as having "Bar-B-Q grills, picnic tables, clean rest rooms and showers for bathers, as well as Bar-B-Q pits, picnic tables, boat ramp and rest rooms by the river." A report from the Florida Board of Parks and Historic Memorials noted that Frank B. Butler State Park had 32,725 overnight visitors in 1965–66 and 53,693 overnight visitors in 1966–67.

After Butler's death in 1973, the park was closed because of vandalism. Lobbying by his family and others prompted the state to lease the park to St. Johns County in 1980 for twenty five years and to grant $75,000 for its operation. The Florida Department of Natural Resources stipulated in the lease agreement that the site should be named the "Frank B. Butler County Park", that it be maintained as a recreation area, with the county protecting ecologically sensitive areas, and that a development plan be submitted to the Department of Natural Resources. The county added around $50,000 in in-kind services and the oak-shaded park by the river was rehabilitated with covered picnic tables, barbecue grills, restrooms, and playground equipment. The adjacent river was dredged and the boat ramp rebuilt. A parking lot, picnic tables, bathrooms and a walkway over the sand dunes were eventually added in the beach section. In 1980 the park was renamed and dedicated to Butler.

== Community affairs ==
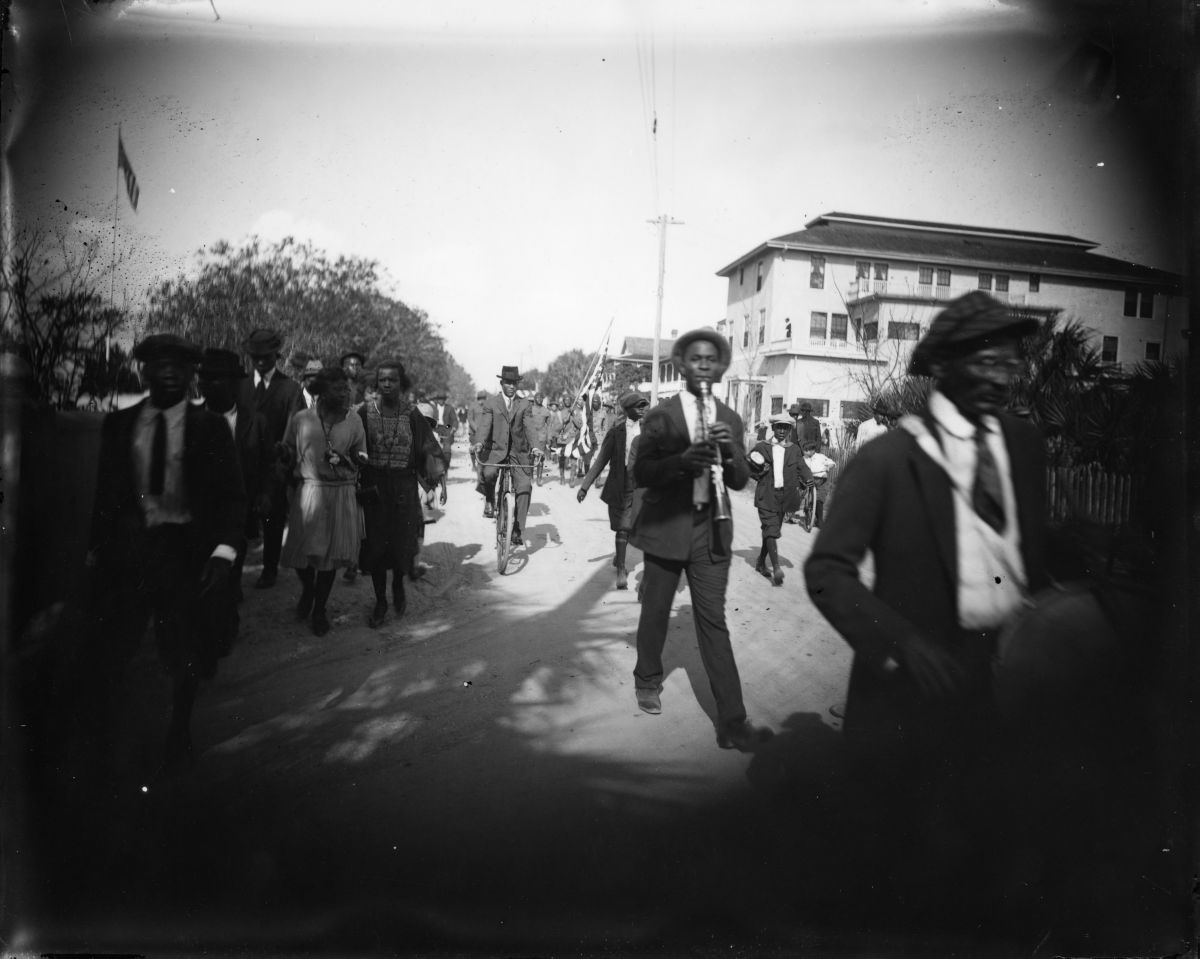
Lincolnville residents commemorating Emancipation Day with an annual parade

Butler was active in Lincolnville community affairs throughout his adult life. He and his family attended religious services at St. Paul's African Methodist Episcopal (A.M.E.) Church, nearby on Central Avenue. He served for many years on the Trustee Board as a lay leader, often as its vice-chairman, and helped get the church on a sound financial basis. He contributed generously to the church and was a delegate to the General Conferences over the years. He helped with the Sunday School and frequently sponsored picnics for underprivileged school children. Among his other activities, Butler participated in the committees that organized the annual Emancipation Proclamation Day celebrations in Lincolnville. In 1935 he wrote to his state representative requesting his support for the award of state scholarships to a black high school graduate from each county in the state. He was a generous contributor to Florida Normal and Industrial College.

== Civil rights years ==
In 1964 Martin Luther King Jr. and his associates Andrew Young, Ralph Abernathy and C. T. Vivian stayed in Butler's motel at the beach during his civil rights visit to St. Augustine. They were there when violent confrontations broke out a few miles away at St. Augustine Beach as white beachgoers objected to African Americans visiting the area's beaches. Martin Luther King was photographed at 5480 Atlantic View by a cottage where he was supposed to stay that was struck by rifle fire, leaving a bullet hole.

In the mid-1960s Butler served on the Citizen's Advisory Committee for the city's Workable Program, which intervened on behalf of black citizens to address their needs, such as streets and beach improvements. He was appointed to the first biracial committee to discuss racial problems following the civil rights protests in St. Augustine during the summer of 1964, in which Martin Luther King Jr. had been arrested and held in jail.

== Legacy ==
Frank B. Butler is buried near the front of Woodlawn Cemetery, which is north of Evergreen Cemetery and King Street in West St. Augustine. At the end of 1973, the St. Augustine Record ran a retrospective piece that mentioned the death of "Frank Butler, prominent civic leader" in June as one of the significant events of the past year. In a time when public lynchings of black Americans by white supremacists were not infrequent in the United States, Butler had set an example for those African Americans who followed him in navigating their way to business success in the Jim Crow South. He used his influence for the betterment of the black community, and bestowed material gifts to improve the lives of many residents of St. Augustine, black and white, in the future.

Frank B. Butler County Park is named for him.
