= Bruce Beach =

Bruce Beach or Bruce's Beach may refer to:

- Bruce Beach (1934–2021), builder of Ark Two Shelter, a nuclear fallout shelter near Toronto, Ontario, Canada
- Bruce Beach, Florida. a former African American resort in Pensacola, Florida
- Bruce's Beach, California, an African American resort
