= Phyllis Morris =

Phyllis Morris may refer to:

- Phyllis Morris (furniture designer)
- Phyllis Morris (actress)
