= Beach house =

House on or near a beach

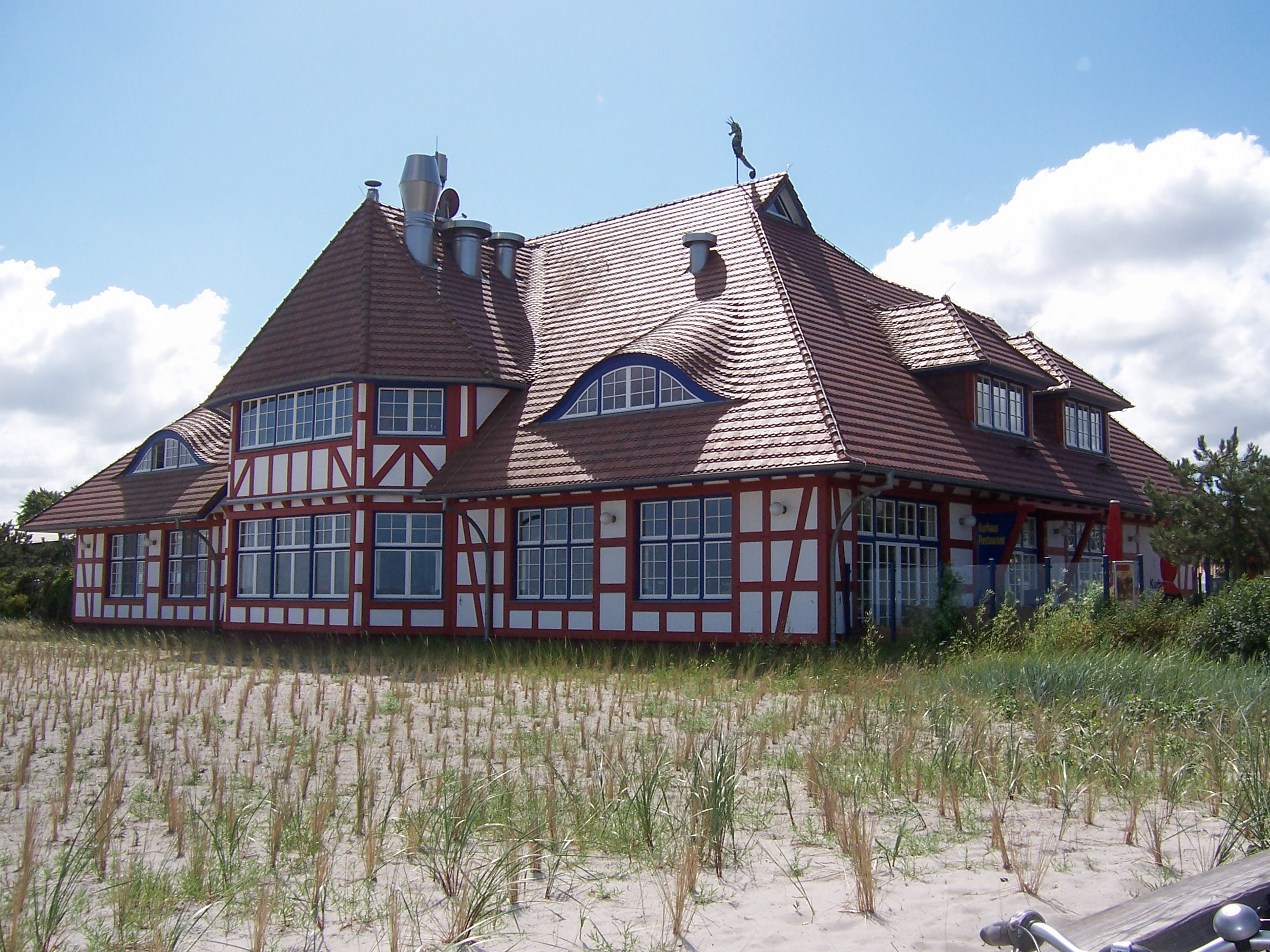
A beach house in Zingst, Western Pomerania, Germany

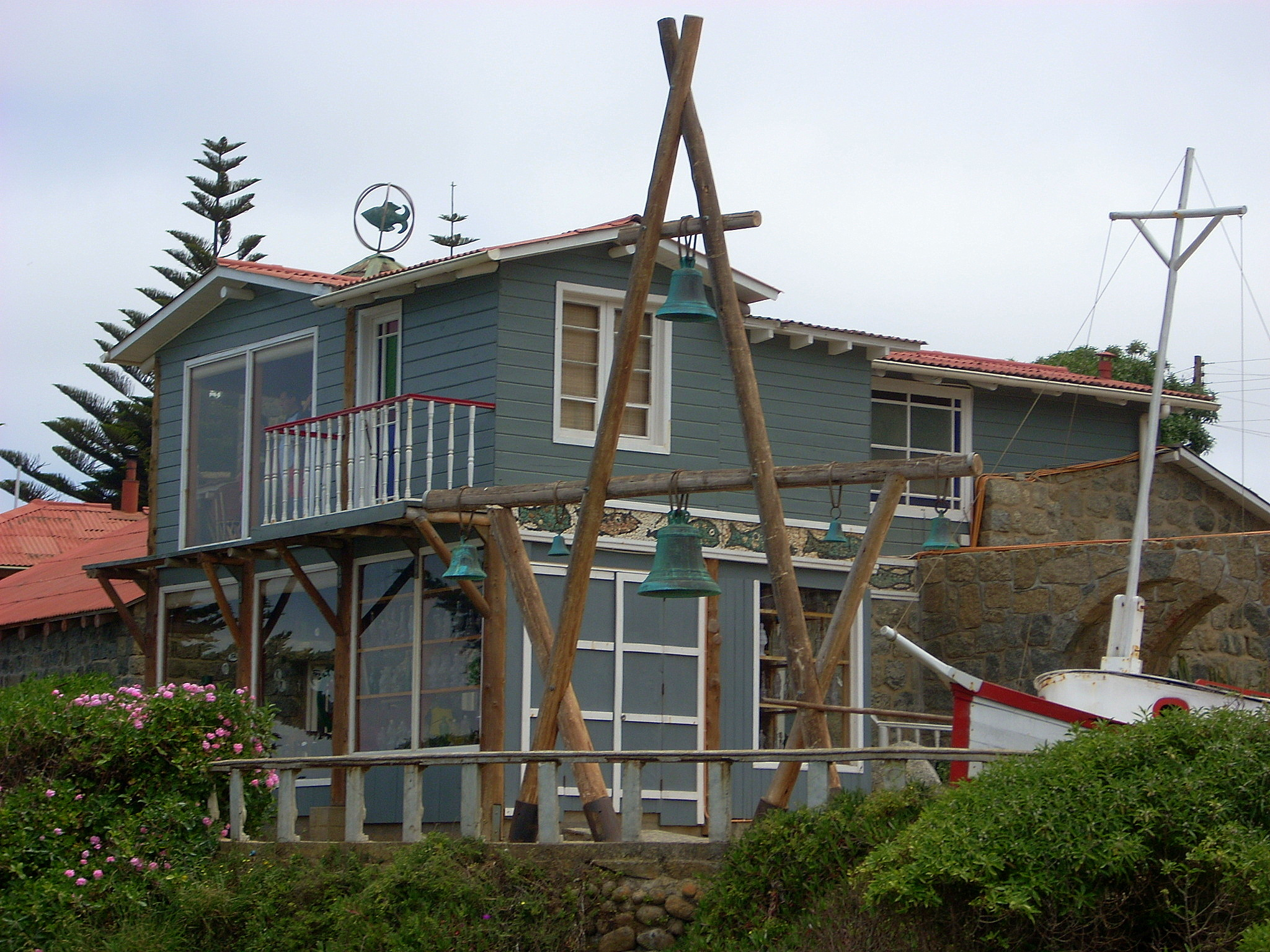
Casa de Isla Negra, Pablo Neruda's famous beach house located at Isla Negra, now a historic house museum and tourist attraction.

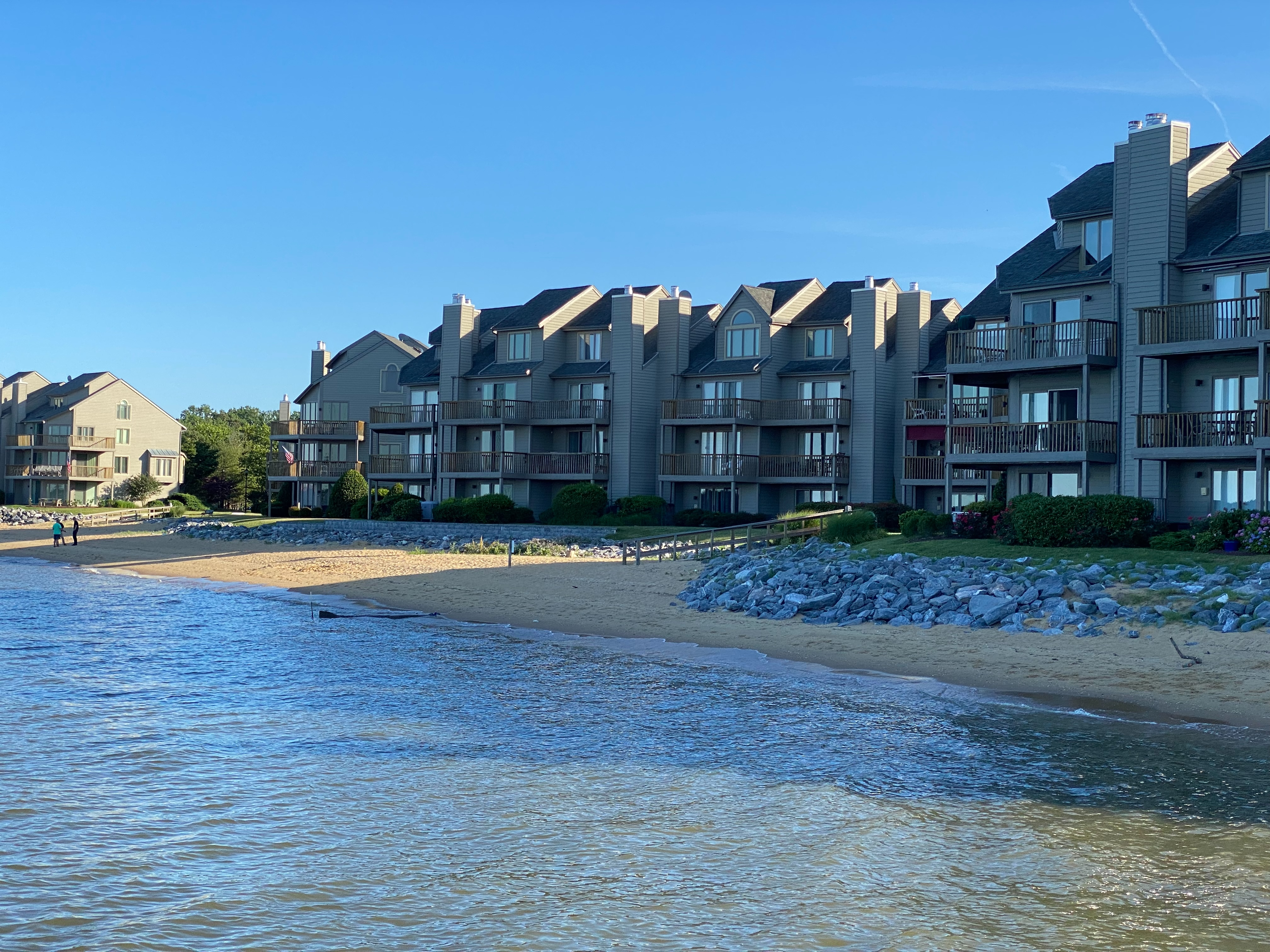
As of 2021, the luxury townhomes on Carr's Beach and Sparrow's Beach.

A beach house is a house on or near a beach, sometimes used as a vacation or second home for people who commute to the house on weekends or during vacation periods. Beach houses are often designed to weather the type of climate they are built in and the building materials and construction methods used in beach housing vary widely around the world. Beach houses require special paint to protect them from the salt water. If a property is built on sand, it needs foundation with special requirements.

Beach houses are often associated with beach gardens with a special planting and a particular type of leisure use. One of the most famous twentieth century beach gardens was constructed by Derek Jarman at Dungeness, England. It celebrated local materials, native plants and the openness of the site. Other beach gardens have tried to create an isolated microclimate. American architect Andrew Geller designed sculptural beach houses in the coastal regions of New England during the 1950s and 1960s.

== See also ==
- List of real estate topics
- Niche real estate
- Beach hut
