= Lake Ivanhoe, Wisconsin =

Census-designated place in Wisconsin, United States

- Census-designated place
- Location within Wisconsin Location within the United States
- Coordinates: 42°34′48″N 88°20′30″W
- Country: United States
- State: Wisconsin
- County: Walworth

Area
  - Total: 0.519 sq mi (1.34 km^{2})
  - Land: 0.519 sq mi (1.34 km^{2})
  - Water: 0 sq mi (0 km^{2})
- Elevation: 886 ft (270 m)

Population (2020)
  - Total: 461
  - Density: 888/sq mi (343/km^{2})
- Time zone: UTC-6 (Central (CST))
  - Summer (DST): UTC-5 (CDT)
- Area code: 262
- GNIS feature ID: 2586517

Lake Ivanhoe is a census-designated place in the Town of Bloomfield, Walworth County, Wisconsin, United States. It was developed in the 1920s as a resort community for middle-class Black Chicagoans. Its population was 461 as of the 2020 census.

== History ==
In 1926, Jeremiah Brumfield, Frank Anglin and Bradford Watson purchased an 83-acre farm on Ryan Lake to develop a resort community for other middle-class Black Chicagoans. A white real estate agent named Ivan Bell brokered the deal, and the community was named Lake Ivanhoe in his honor. In addition to private lots for cottages and summer homes, the resort included a music pavilion that opened in 1927 with a performance by Cab Calloway. The resort also hosted fishing contests, beauty pageants, and boxing matches.

Lake Ivanhoe was successful until 1929, when property sales declined during the Great Depression. In 1934, Chicago Bears player Edward Sternaman began purchasing unsold property at Lake Ivanhoe with the intention of turning the community into a white resort. He built fences to restrict Black residents' beach and lakefront access, but when the residents filed a civil suit, a judge ruled that the lake was a public good, and Sternaman abandoned his plans and left the area.

Black families continued to move to the area after World War II, making it a year-round community by the 1970s. A government housing program in the 1990s brought new white and Latino families to Lake Ivanhoe, changing the demographics such that African-Americans only made up 9 percent of the community's population at the 2020 census.

== Demographics ==
The of population of Lake Ivanhoe includes 78.14% White, 4.12% Black or African American, with the remainder being other races and multiracial populations.

Historical population
Census	Pop.	Note	%±
2010	435		—
2020	461		6.0%
U.S. Decennial Census

== See also ==
- African American resorts
