= Winks Panorama =

Former hotel in Colorado catering to African-Americans

- U.S. National Register of Historic Places
- U.S. National Historic Landmark
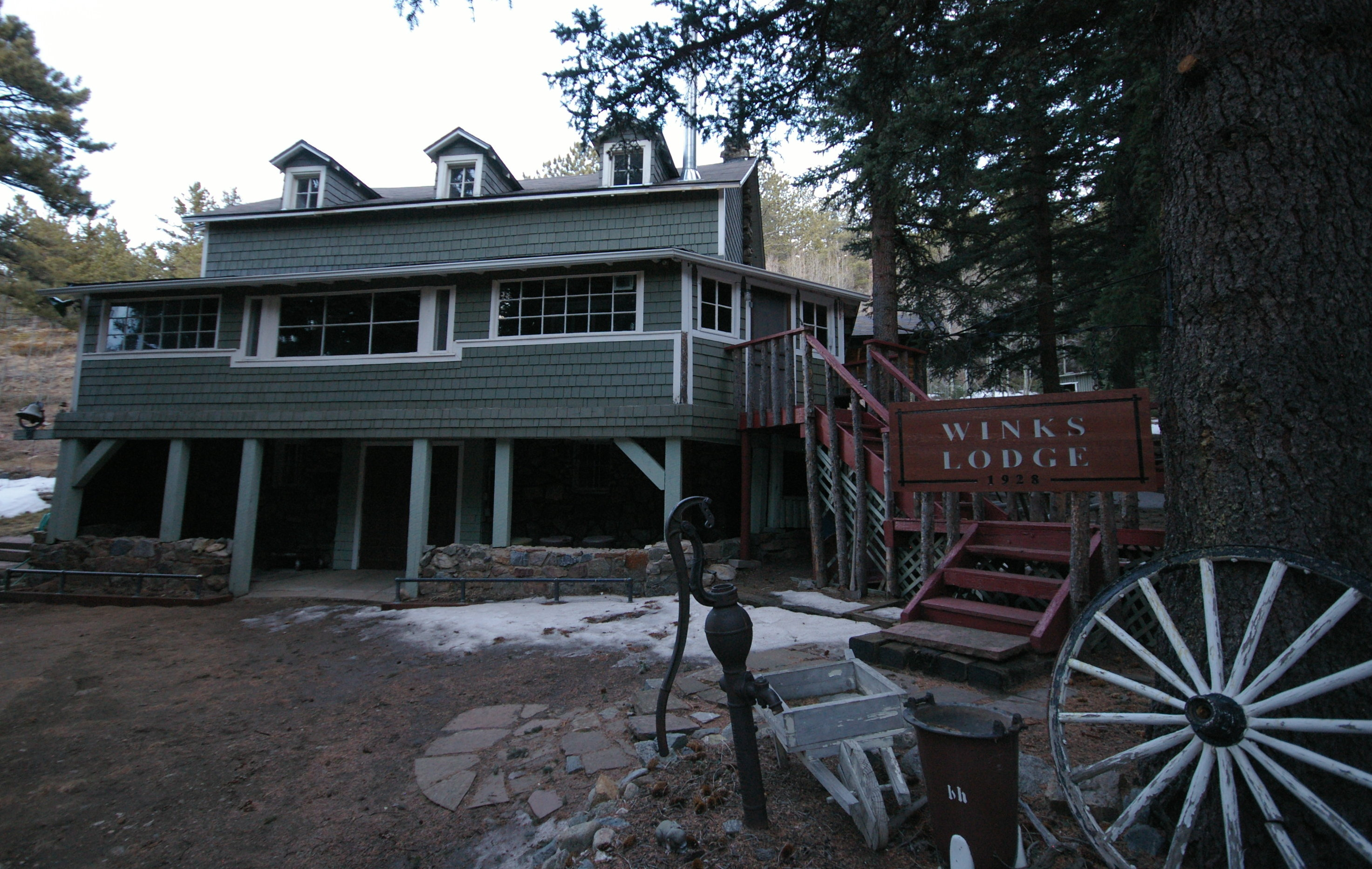

- Location within Colorado Location within the United States
- Nearest city: Pinecliffe, Colorado
- Coordinates: 39°55′16″N 105°27′25″W
- Built: 1925
- Architect: Wendall Hamlet
- NRHP reference No.: 80000901 (original); 13001035; 100009805 (NHL designation) (increase)

Significant dates
- Added to NRHP: March 28, 1980
- Boundary increase: October 15, 2014
- Designated NHL: December 11, 2023

Winks Panorama, also known as Winks Lodge, was a hotel near Pinecliffe, Colorado catering to African-American tourists during the early and middle 20th century. The lodge was built in the Lincoln Hills Country Club, which was at the time the only African-American resort in the western United States. The Lincoln Hills club was organized in 1922, selling lots with payments as low as $5.00 down and $5.00 per month. The lodge was built by Obrey Wendell "Winks" Hamlet in 1928. Hamlet had been involved in the original club project, and had been assembling land for a lodge since 1925. The Wall Street Crash of 1929 caused many lots in Lincoln Hills to be abandoned, but Hamlet promoted the lodge nationally through advertisements in Ebony and attracted a clientele from the eastern United States.

The hillside lodge used local stone for the foundation, with a three-story shingled superstructure. The first floor was for service and storage, the second for dining and entertainment, and the third included six guest rooms and a shared bath. Several cabins surrounded the main lodge, including a honeymoon cabin and a tavern.

Prominent guests included Count Basie, Billy Eckstein, Duke Ellington, Lena Horne, Langston Hughes and Zora Neale Hurston.

The lodge operated until Winks' death in 1965. It is now owned by the James Beckwourth Mountain Club, which has undertaken restoration of the lodge as a conference center. Winks Panorama was listed on the National Register of Historic Places on March 28, 1980. On December 11, 2023, the United States Department of the Interior designated the lodge a National Historic Landmark.

== See also ==
- National Register of Historic Places listings in Gilpin County, Colorado
- List of National Historic Landmarks in Colorado
- African American resorts

Other African-American resorts included:

- American Beach, Florida
- Oak Bluffs, Massachusetts
- Idlewild, Michigan
