= Bruce Beach, Florida =

Park under construction in Florida, US

Coordinates: 30.4050°N 87.2233°W

Bruce Beach is a park under construction in Pensacola, Florida. It was formerly an industrial area and was once home to a pool for African American residents. In 2023, it underwent revitalization. It was once a gathering spot for the area's African American residents.

Bruce Beach had a swimming pool until the 1970s. A pedestrian bridge over Washerwoman Creek is planned to connect the park to Community Maritime Park. Signage addressing the history is also planned.

== See also ==
- African American resorts
- Butler Beach
