= Phyllis Morris (furniture designer) =

American furniture designer (1925–1988)

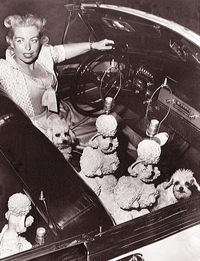
Phyllis Morris in 1953 with her pink poodle lamps and pink-dyed poodles

Phyllis Morris (born October 19, 1925, in Chicago, Illinois; died September 5, 1988, in Los Angeles, California) was an American furniture designer known for her colorful persona, her outspokenness on decorating and her distinctive furniture and interior designs, especially her large and highly decorative beds. She was often referred to by the media as the "designer to the stars." By the time of her death, Morris had left a mark in the world of interior design in each of the four decades since the founding of her company Phyllis Morris Originals in 1953.

== Early career ==
While a teenager, Morris' family moved from Chicago to Los Angeles where she pursued art classes at UCLA as well as a brief stint in acting. In 1953 Morris created a lamp whose design was based on one of her primitive figure clay sculptures. The lamp was manufactured by W.J. Sloan's, a Los Angeles department store and became so successful that Morris decided to pursue self-manufacturing of the second lamp design—a poodle lamp modeled after her own pink-dyed poodle Pamela—and set up a factory in nearby Burbank. Three years later in 1956 Morris married Nathan Goller, a prominent Beverly Hills attorney, and together they had two children, James and Jamie.

The poodle lamp propelled Morris into the limelight and it wasn't long before she became a local celebrity. Often wearing a full-length mink coat and pink pedal pusher slacks, she would drive throughout Los Angeles in a pink Cadillac convertible with its top down and the front and back seats filled with pink poodle lamps and real pink-dyed poodles in the front seat. Famed newspaper columnist Walter Winchell eventually wrote "Who's the wise guy that said 'beauty and business don't mix?' Meet striking blonde Phyllis Morris. She's been setting this nation's furniture styling for ten years."

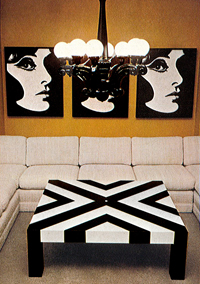
Pop goes the Sixties! This Phyllis Morris vignette from 1964 shows a Pop Art poster introduced by Morris that was later transformed into wallpaper in 2005 by Morris' daughter Jamie Adler

== Style ==
Shortly after opening a lighting showroom in 1955 on Melrose Place in Los Angeles, Morris began adding her own furniture designs to round out the offerings. Initially these furniture collections drew upon the Spanish Colonial look with dark woods, large carved scrollwork and baroque elements as well as other Mediterranean-inspired styles. As the 1960s approached, Morris included more modern styles using lacquer and exotic finishes and materials and moved to a larger showroom on nearby Beverly Boulevard in 1961. The "swinging sixties" fueled by a youth culture fascinated with music, fashion and alternative arts and religions ushered in a freer social attitude towards lifestyles which gave Morris and others in the design profession an opportunity to shake up the interior design world (which still relied heavily on English and Colonial American influences) with her distinctive vision of how colorful and eclectic interiors could be.

A typical Morris room setting during the mid-1960s would find Pop art accessories and objets d'art commingling with often large or over-scaled furniture. All together, this created a look that defined Morris' style which brought international attention to high-profile residential interiors and hotel projects where her pieces were used. Bright colors, large patterns and bold designs were devices favored by Morris to make a design statement wherever possible. "I'm a designer's designer," she told The Globe and Mail in 1961., alluding to her role as a source of furnishings to the top interior designers in the industry. Over the course of time, Morris developed a loyal following among interior designers and prominent figures on the Los Angeles arts and culture scene.

Becoming more entrenched in the social world of Los Angeles and Hollywood as her fame grew, Morris befriended many in the show business community and counted Joan Crawford, Lucille Ball, Gypsy Rose Lee, Liberace, Joan Collins, Regis Philbin and author Harold Robbins, to name a few, as part of her inner circle. And so impressive were Morris' parties at both her Beverly Hills home and her Los Angeles showroom that Town & Country magazine wrote "Certainly this was THE top party of the holiday season," referring to a 1966 soiree at Morris' 17-room manse. Many Hollywood film fans would have relished being at the Morris showroom in 1970 when Joan Crawford stopped in to look for artwork for her home. Morris offered the screen legend a Coca-Cola. The following day, 20 cases of Pepsi-Cola arrived at the Phyllis Morris showroom with a note from Crawford saying "Pour all those Cokes down the drain."

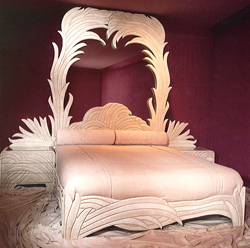
The lacquered Palm Leaf Bed with its soaring mirrored headboard was introduced by Phyllis Morris in the early 1980s

During personal appearances and media interviews, Morris would offer provocative quips or do something seemingly outrageous which provided never-ending material for the press and often made headlines around the globe. The Toronto Daily Star ran a photo of Morris wearing a mink coat backwards in public which "shocked the other women" of Toronto noted reporter Penny Longley on Morris' first-ever visit to the Canadian city. Morris casually referred to the coat as her "mink muu muu." Among her many eyebrow-raising quotes: "Twin beds have no place in a happy marriage, but separate bedrooms have and "Minimalism is for those without much to say." When it came to talking about herself, Morris was always forthcoming but with a sense of humor. "I don't think anyone in our family is hurt by the fact that I don't scrub floors or peel potatoes," she told Home Furnishings Daily. "As a matter of fact, they'd rather I wouldn't because I'm so bad at housekeeping.

== Extravagant interiors ==
In addition to designing furniture for residences in Los Angeles and around the country, Morris enjoyed creating pieces for high-roller suites in Las Vegas, Nevada where her opulent style was a perfect match. Her interiors for the Imperial Suite at the International Hotel built by mega-developer Kirk Kerkorian cost more than $200,000 to furnish, a handsome sum for 1970. A columnist reported in the Chicago Tribune that helicopters were needed to airlift Morris' massively-scaled furniture through the penthouse windows. "She's tops in this town," said writer Norma Lee Browning about Morris. The first occupant of this 6,000-square-foot (560 m^{2}) suite was Frank Sinatra, followed by Jackie and Aristotle Onassis for whom the space was originally designed. Morris always wondered what the former First Lady and the Greek shipping tycoon thought of the fur rugs she used throughout. Morris also provided furnishings for Elvis Presley's 4,000-square-foot (370 m^{2}) suite at the Las Vegas Hilton in the mid-1970s with its black carpeting and furniture upholstered in white and yellow silk. "We had to redo his sofas twice a year," Morris told the Houston Chronicle. "He didn't care if he damaged the room, but he didn't want anybody else hurting things. And there were always white and yellow orchids."

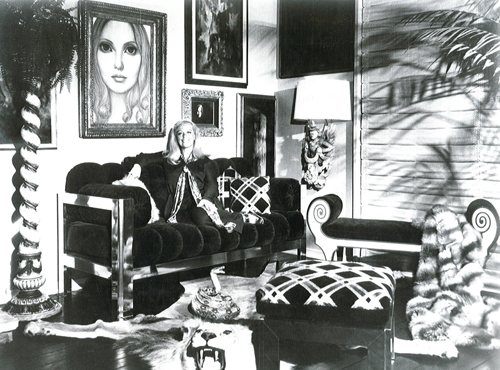
Phyllis Morris in her Beverly Boulevard showroom in the early 1970s surrounded by a colorful array of furnishings including a large portrait by Margaret Keane whom Morris befriended in the early 1960s

Such was Morris' reputation for producing lavish and expensive beds that People magazine ran a feature story on her in 1978, noting such clients as Gladys Knight, Allan Carr, Cher and even Who drummer Keith Moon (for whom Morris outfitted a Malibu, California beach house). "I knew I had to make something that no one else could build cheaper," said Morris about her beds. "In Vegas, I've done beds in gold with gold inlays." Among the interiors and furnishings Morris created for film producer Allan Carr (Grease; Grease 2) was a glittering Egyptian-themed subterranean disco in his Beverly Hills house where actors John Travolta and Olivia Newton-John danced the night away for the paparazzi. Newton-John later appear in a risqué photo taken in the Phyllis Morris's showroom by renowned photographer Helmut Newton, who posed the singer topless for her 1985 Soul Kiss album artwork.

== Business leadership ==
Active in the business sector of the design community as well, Phyllis Morris was vice president of the Beverly-Robertson Association, a Los Angeles-based organization she helped established in 1979 to "upgrade the appearance of the West Side design center area centered on Beverly and Robertson boulevards and to create a unique visual identity for it." This was the first organization of its kind for L.A.'s booming interior design district which later separated from Los Angeles in 1984 to become the City of West Hollywood. After cityhood was achieved due to the efforts of Morris and others in the design district, she went on to serve on the board of directors for the West Hollywood Marketing Corporation.

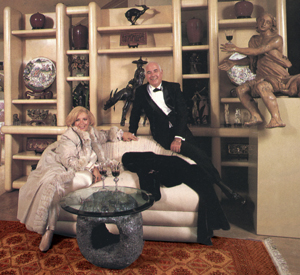
Phyllis Morris and husband Nathan Goller in 1985 in the Beverly Boulevard showroom. A massive room divider exemplified the large-scaled furnishings offered by Morris

The Phyllis Morris Beverly Boulevard showroom was host to many charitable and political fund-raising events for more than three decades, as well as fashion and art shows. During the early 1960s, Morris befriended artist Margaret Keane, a painter known internationally for her big-eyed "waifs." Morris hosted a number of shows for Keane in Los Angeles and eventually commissioned dozens of works from her—works which are still owned by Morris' family members. The late famed fashion commentator Mr. Blackwell wrote of Morris, "Her showroom has been the scene for raising literally millions of dollars over the years for worthy causes...she has become one of the great hostesses in town."

== The 1980s ==
In the 1980s, Morris wrote a long-running column which appeared in the Beverly Hills Courier, the Baltimore Sun and the Orange County Register appropriately named "Living in Style," in which she dispensed advice on decorating ranging from the practical to the extravagant. Morris was also a frequent guest on the Los Angeles television show A.M. Los Angeles in the early 1980s where she demonstrated interior design techniques for host Regis Philbin.

Shortly before her untimely passing, Morris was named Woman of the Year in 1988 by City of Hope hospital in Southern California. Morris also received a commendation in November 1988 from Los Angeles mayor Tom Bradley recognizing her achievements as "an outstanding woman in America."

Because of their dramatic design and presence, many Phyllis Morris pieces have been featured in both films and television shows ranging from Dynasty in the 1980s to Oceans 12 in 2004 as well as music videos in 2007 and 2008 by Mariah Carey and P. Diddy to name a few.

In 2005, the Phyllis Morris Originals showroom moved from its 8772 Beverly Boulevard location to 655 N. Robertson Boulevard in West Hollywood, approximately three blocks to the northwest. The company has been headed by Morris' daughter Jamie Adler who runs the business along with her husband John Adler and her father Nathan Goller. With the move to Robertson Boulevard, the company added two divisions: Circa Furniture which offers a contemporary collection of furniture; and 655 Home, a luxury home accessories boutique created by Adler as well. Although the Phyllis Morris Originals showroom in West Hollywood is closed, the company does maintain a tribute website showcasing the history and achievements of Ms. Phyllis Morris, a most remarkable lady indeed.
