= Bay Street Beach Historic District =

Historic beach in Santa Monica, California, US

- U.S. National Register of Historic Places
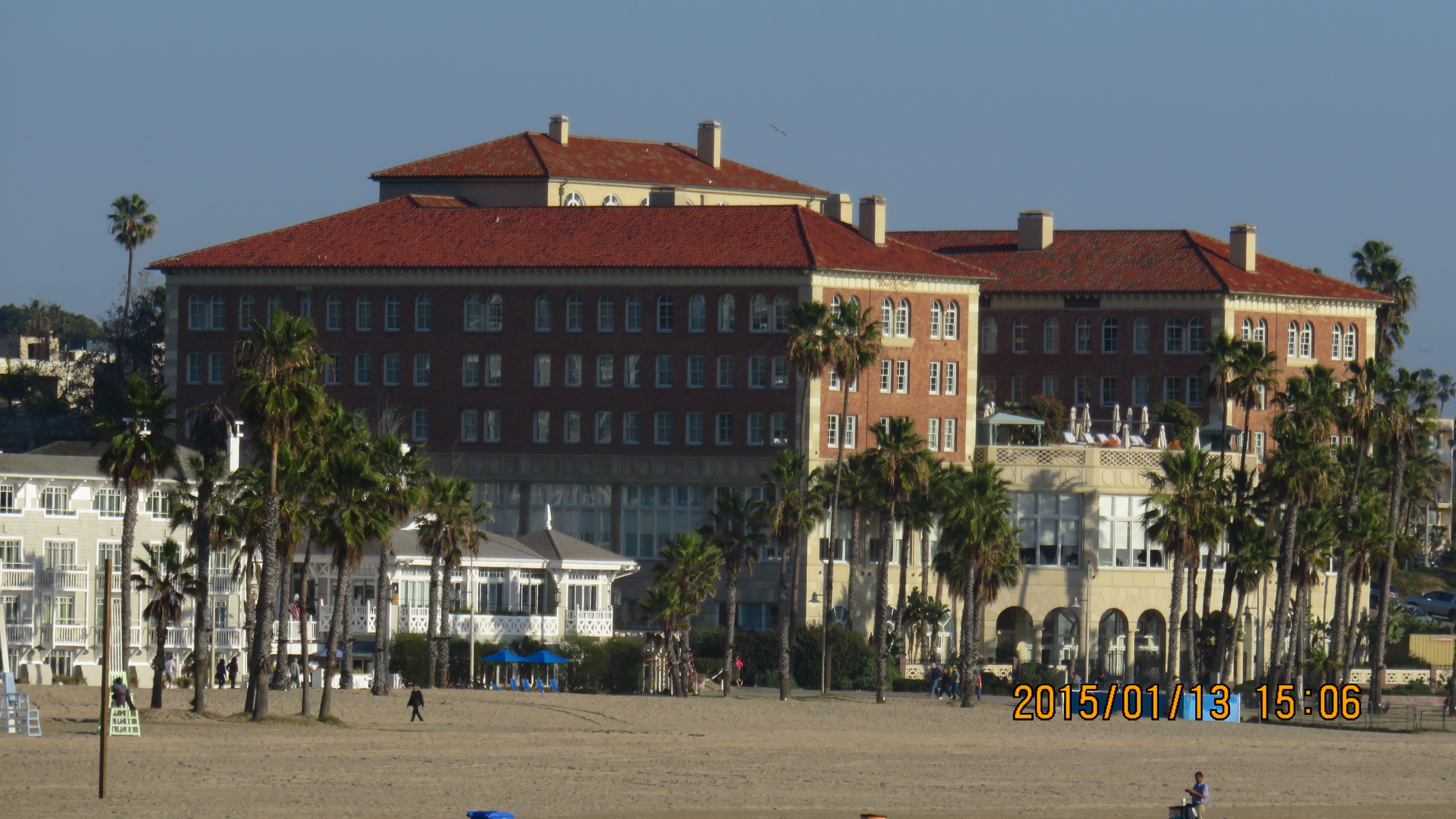

- Location within the Los Angeles metropolitan area Location within California Location within the United States
- Location: Roughly bounded by Pacific Ocean, Ocean Front Walk from Vicente Ter. to Crescent Bay Park, Bicknell Ave. extending into ocean
- Coordinates: 34°00′23″N 118°29′31″W
- Area: 53 acres (21 ha)
- NRHP reference No.: 100004116
- Added to NRHP: June 26, 2019

Bay Street Beach Historic District (also known as the Inkwell) is a historic beach in Los Angeles County.

== History ==
The beach was a place of recreation and leisure for African Americans during the Jim Crow era. The beach was located at Pico Boulevard and two city blocks south of Bicknell Street, near Phillips Chapel Christian Methodist Episcopal Church . In 1922, the Santa Monica Bay Protective League was organized to attempt to fence the beach to exclude African Americans. In 1927, the National Association for the Advancement of Colored People challenged restrictive covenants at Manhattan Beach, south of Santa Monica, which were overturned by the Supreme Court of California .

Alison Rose Jefferson and Michael Blum documented the history of the district. In 2008, Santa Monica officially recognized the district.

== See also ==
- African American resorts
- National Register of Historic Places listings in Los Angeles County, California
