= Elktonia-Carr's Beach Heritage Park =

Beach in Maryland, United States

Coordinates: 38.95640°N 76.47165°W

Elktonia-Carr's Beach Heritage Park is in Maryland near Annapolis. It commemorates Elktonia Beach and Carr's Beach, beach resort areas open to African Americans during segregation. Sparrow's Beach was also part of the 180 acres of beachfront property. Five acres remain. A plan for a heritage park was launched in 2017. Carr's Beach is across from the Annapolis Maritime Museum.

== Carr's Beach ==
Carr's Beach was founded in 1926, was a beachfront resort on the Chesapeake Bay that catered to African American patrons during segregation. Located just south of Annapolis, Maryland, Carr's Beach was established as a recreational area during the Jim Crow-era when African-Americans were denied entry into 'Whites-only' establishments. Carr's Beach was a stop on the Chitlin' Circuit and hosted musical acts like Chuck Berry, Billie Holiday, Duke Ellington, and Ike & Tina Turner.

Other nearby beachfront resorts used for this purpose included Sparrow’s Beach, Elktonia Beach, Bembe Beach, Highland Beach, Venice Beach, Oyster Harbor, and Arundel-on-the-Bay. The resort ceased operations in 1974.

In August 2022, the City of Annapolis acquired Carr's Beach to preserve it as a park.

== Establishment and expansion ==
Frederick Carr, who had been formerly enslaved, and his wife, Mary Wells Carr, purchased 180 acres (73 ha) of waterfront property on the Annapolis Neck peninsula in 1902. The couple hosted boarders and events. In 1926, they established Carr's Beach, a Chesapeake Bay beachfront resort for African American patrons. Due to segregation laws at the time, African Americans were barred from using 'Whites-only' beaches nearby.

Frederick and Mary's daughter, Elizabeth Carr Smith, operated Carr's Beach. Her sister, Florence Carr Sparrow, established a neighboring resort called Sparrow's Beach in 1931.

Elizabeth Carr Smith died in a car accident in 1948. Her son Frederick and businessman William L. “Li’l Willie” Adams created Carr’s Beach Amusement Company. Adams and Elizabeth Carr Smith's heirs invested $150,000 in Carr's Beach expanding it to include a midway and a venue called Club Bengazi.

== Operations ==
=== 1926 - late 1960s ===
Carr's Beach hosted visitors seeking waterfront recreation and live entertainment. Musical acts that performed at Carr's Beach included Chuck Berry, James Brown, Cab Calloway, Duke Ellington, Billie Holiday, Little Richard, The Shirelles, and The Temptations, and Ike & Tina Turner.

Events at Carr's Beach were often broadcast on radio by Hoppy Adams (Charles W. Adams, Jr.), a disk jockey at Annapolis radio station, WANN (1190 AM).

=== Late 1960s ===
Carr's Beach was purchased and operated by new owners in the late 1960s. The resort, along with similar resorts catering to African American patrons, became less popular after the end of segregation.

Between the late 1960s and 1973, Carr's Beach continued operations and presented performers like Led Zeppelin and Rare Earth. In 1973, Frank Zappa became the last musical act to perform at the resort. Carr's Beach closed in 1974.

== Legacy and preservation ==
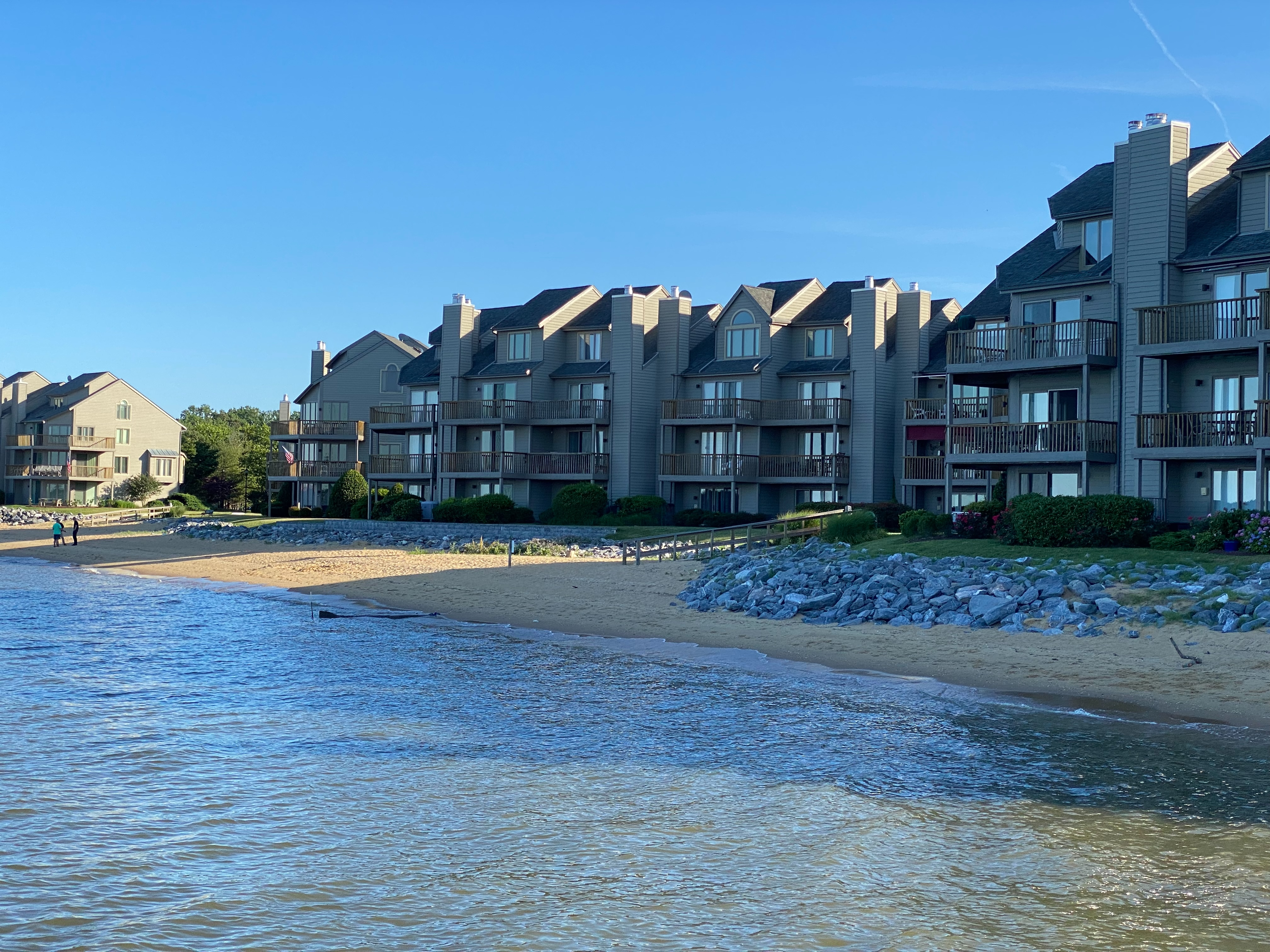
As of 2021, the luxury townhomes on Carr's Beach and Sparrow's Beach.

A mural commemorating Carr's Beach was unveiled in Annapolis on May 22, 2021. The mural, designed by artist Comacell Brown, is located on an exterior wall of StageOne at Park Place, a venue of the Maryland Cultural and Conference Center.

In August 2022, the City of Annapolis acquired five bay-front acres that included the remains of Carr's Beach, Sparrow's Beach, and Elktonia Beach. The acquisition was a result of collaborative efforts of the Blacks of the Chesapeake Foundation, Chesapeake Conservancy, the City of Annapolis, the State of Maryland, and The Conservation Fund.

Elktonia-Carr's Beach Heritage Park will be established as a public park.
