= Butler Beach, Florida =

Butler Beach
- CDP
- Location in St. Johns County and the state of Florida
- Coordinates: 29°47′53″N 81°15′55″W
- Country: United States
- State: Florida
- County: St. Johns

Area
  - Total: 2.66 sq mi (6.88 km^{2})
  - Land: 2.54 sq mi (6.59 km^{2})
  - Water: 0.11 sq mi (0.29 km^{2})
- Elevation: 7 ft (2.1 m)

Population (2020)
  - Total: 4,978
  - Density: 1,956.9/sq mi (755.58/km^{2})
- Time zone: UTC-5 (Eastern (EST))
  - Summer (DST): UTC-4 (EDT)
- FIPS code: 12-09630
- GNIS feature ID: 2402737

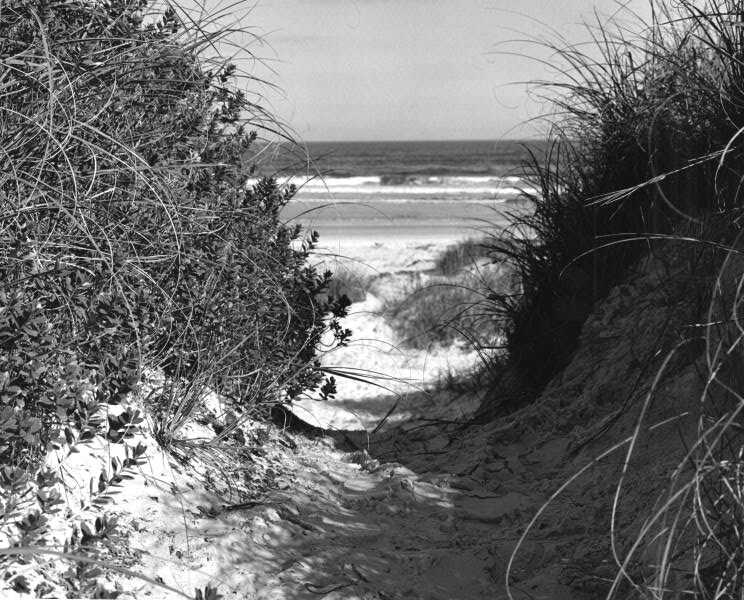
Path to the beach cut through the sand dunes at Frank B. Butler State Park, c. 1960

Butler Beach is a census-designated place (CDP) in St. Johns County, Florida, United States. The population was 4,978 at the time of the 2020 United States census, up from 4,951 at the 2010 census. It is part of the Jacksonville, Florida Metropolitan Statistical Area. Established by Frank B. Butler, who had been successful in operating a grocery store and became a political activist, it was a resort for African Americans. The Lincolnville businessman bought land in the area between the Atlantic Ocean and the Matanzas River, and offered beach access to African Americans. It was the only beach open to them between Jacksonville and Daytona Beach. The site of his beach resort is a stop on the St. Johns County Black History Trail.

== Geography ==
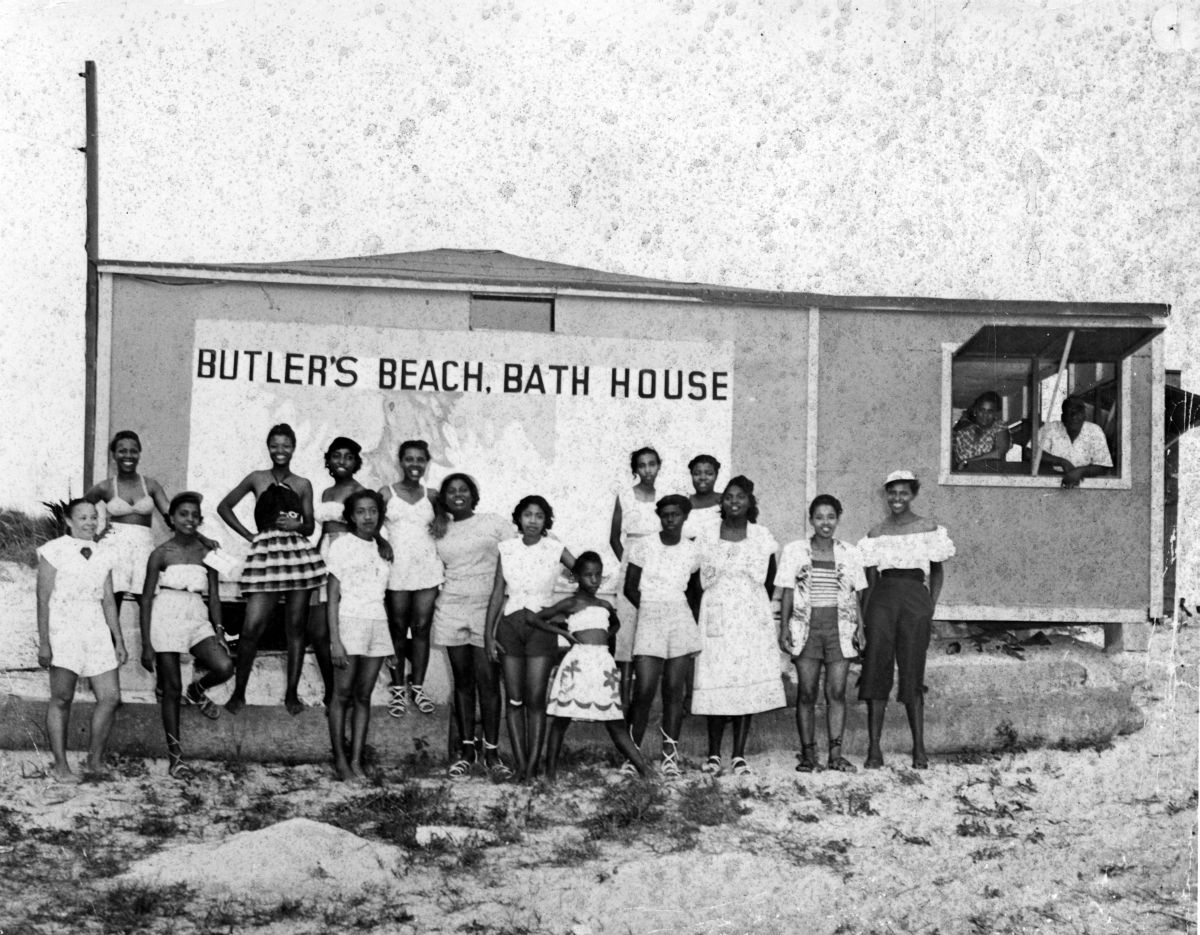
Beach-goers assembled for a group portrait by the bath house at Butler Beach

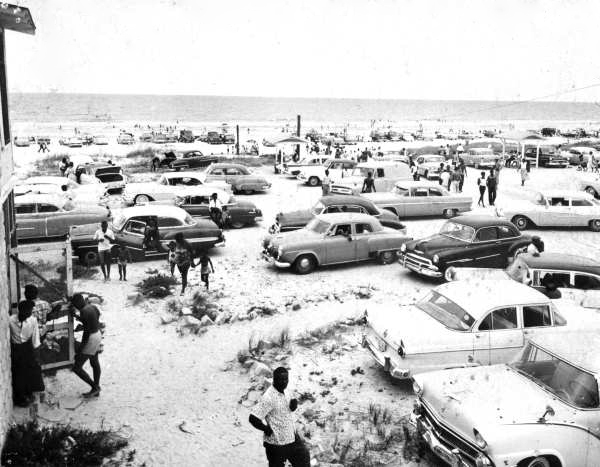
Cars pack the parking area at Butler Beach

According to the United States Census Bureau, the CDP has a total area of 2.5 square miles (6.5 km^{2}), all land.

== Demographics ==
Historical population
Census	Pop.	Note	%±
1990	3,377		—
2000	4,436		31.4%
2010	4,951		11.6%
2020	4,978		0.5%
U.S. Decennial Census

=== 2020 census ===
As of the 2020 census, Butler Beach had a population of 4,978. The median age was 62.5 years. 9.2% of residents were under the age of 18 and 43.3% of residents were 65 years of age or older. For every 100 females there were 91.6 males, and for every 100 females age 18 and over there were 89.2 males age 18 and over.

100.0% of residents lived in urban areas, while 0.0% lived in rural areas.

There were 2,529 households in Butler Beach, of which 12.9% had children under the age of 18 living in them. Of all households, 53.0% were married-couple households, 14.2% were households with a male householder and no spouse or partner present, and 27.4% were households with a female householder and no spouse or partner present. About 30.9% of all households were made up of individuals and 18.4% had someone living alone who was 65 years of age or older.

There were 4,530 housing units, of which 44.2% were vacant. The homeowner vacancy rate was 1.9% and the rental vacancy rate was 35.7%.

Racial composition as of the 2020 census
Race	Number	Percent
White	4,600	92.4%
Black or African American	33	0.7%
American Indian and Alaska Native	11	0.2%
Asian	22	0.4%
Native Hawaiian and Other Pacific Islander	2	0.0%
Some other race	26	0.5%
Two or more races	284	5.7%
Hispanic or Latino (of any race)	211	4.2%

=== 2000 census ===
As of the census of 2000, there were 4,436 people, 2,152 households, and 1,385 families residing in the CDP. The population density was 1,783.0 inhabitants per square mile (688.4/km^{2}). There were 3,694 housing units at an average density of 1,484.8 per square mile (573.3/km^{2}). The racial makeup of the CDP was 97.97% White, 0.29% African American, 0.18% Native American, 0.70% Asian, 0.41% from other races, and 0.45% from two or more races. Hispanic or Latino of any race were 1.49% of the population.

There were 2,152 households, out of which 13.6% had children under the age of 18 living with them, 57.8% were married couples living together, 4.8% had a female householder with no husband present, and 35.6% were non-families. 28.0% of all households were made up of individuals, and 12.7% had someone living alone who was 65 years of age or older. The average household size was 2.06 and the average family size was 2.47.

In the CDP, the population was spread out, with 12.1% under the age of 18, 4.3% from 18 to 24, 19.6% from 25 to 44, 34.4% from 45 to 64, and 29.6% who were 65 years of age or older. The median age was 54 years. For every 100 females, there were 94.8 males. For every 100 females age 18 and over, there were 93.4 males.

The median income for a household in the CDP was $46,319, and the median income for a family was $61,850. Males had a median income of $36,875 versus $31,399 for females. The per capita income for the CDP was $31,193. About 4.2% of families and 6.3% of the population were below the poverty line, including 10.2% of those under age 18 and 3.6% of those age 65 or over.

== Education ==
It is in the St. Johns County School District. Zoned schools include W. D. Hartley Elementary School, Gamble Rogers Middle School, and Pedro Menendez High School.

== See also ==
- African American resorts
