= Sparrow's Beach =

Beach resort in Maryland, United States

Coordinates: 38.95865°N 76.47251°W

Sparrow's Beach was a beachfront resort on the Chesapeake Bay that catered to African American patrons during segregation in the American South.

Located just south of Annapolis, Maryland, Sparrow's Beach was established as a recreational area during the Jim Crow-era when African-Americans were denied entry into 'Whites-only' establishments. Other nearby beachfront resorts used for this purpose included Carr's Beach, Elktonia Beach, Bembe Beach, Highland Beach, Venice Beach, Oyster Harbor, and Arundel-on-the-Bay.

In August 2022, the City of Annapolis purchased what remains of Sparrow's Beach, Carr's Beach, and Elktonia Beach to preserve the land as a park.

== History ==
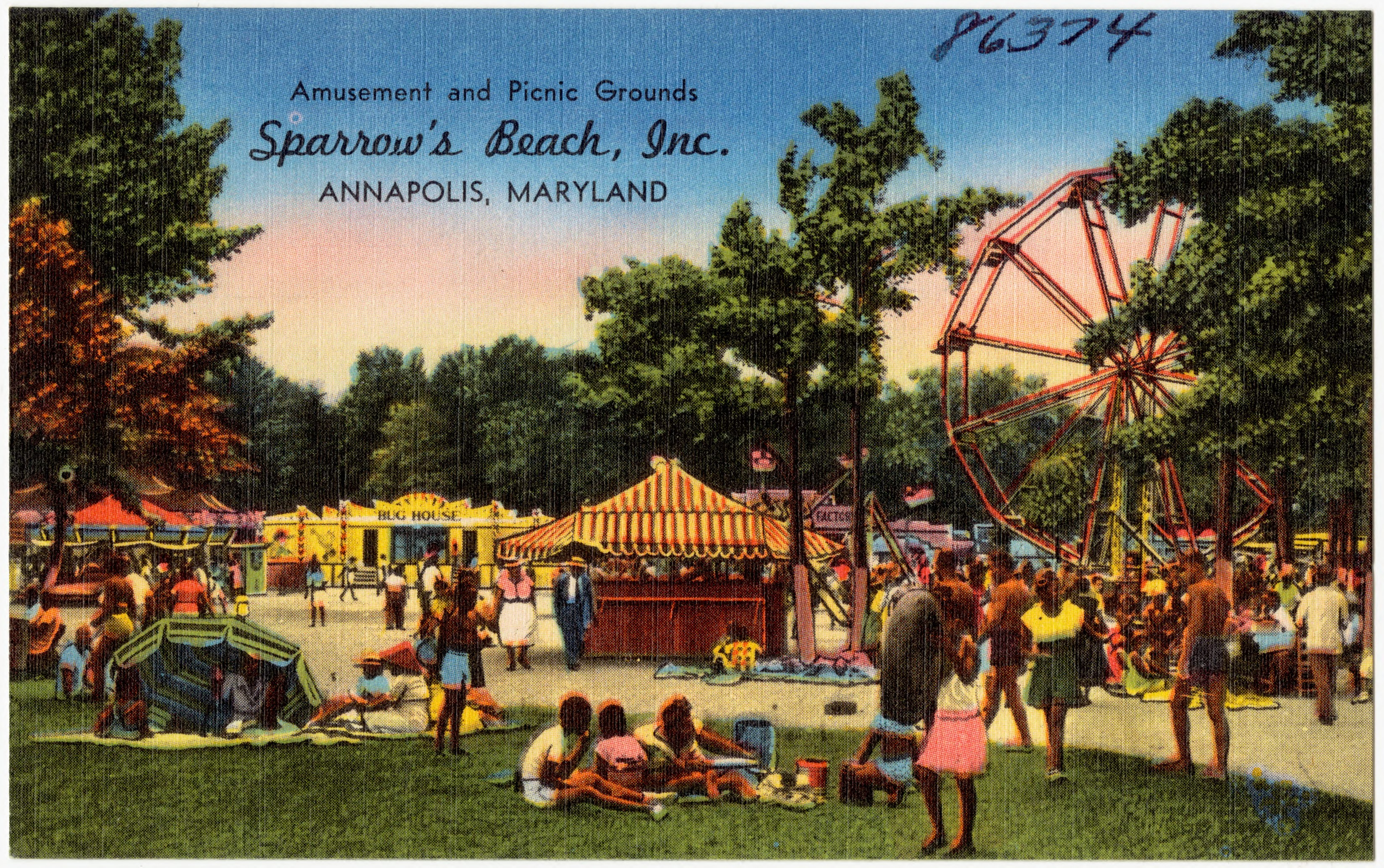
Image of Sparrow's Beach family entertainment.

Frederick Carr and Mary Wells Carr, Black Americans, purchased 180 acres of waterfront property on the Annapolis Neck peninsula in 1902. In 1926, they established a beachfront resort called Carr's Beach on the land. Their daughter, Elizabeth Carr Smith, operated Carr's Beach. Their younger daughter, Florence Carr Sparrow (1890-1989), established neighboring Sparrow's Beach on the land in 1931. Whereas Carr's Beach was popular for swimming and fishing, Sparrow's Beach was better known for family entertainment and featured a carnival, ball park, and beauty contests. Musicians Billie Holiday, Count Basie, and Sarah Vaughan among others regularly performed at the beach on weekends as part of the Chitlin' Circuit. While many local Black residents frequented the beaches, visitors traveled from all over the East Coast and also Ohio to the west. Sparrow's Beach operated for about forty years.

In 1971, Anne Arundel County condemned over 35 acres of Sparrow's Beach, making way for the Annapolis Water Reclamation Facility and condominiums.

== Legacy and preservation ==
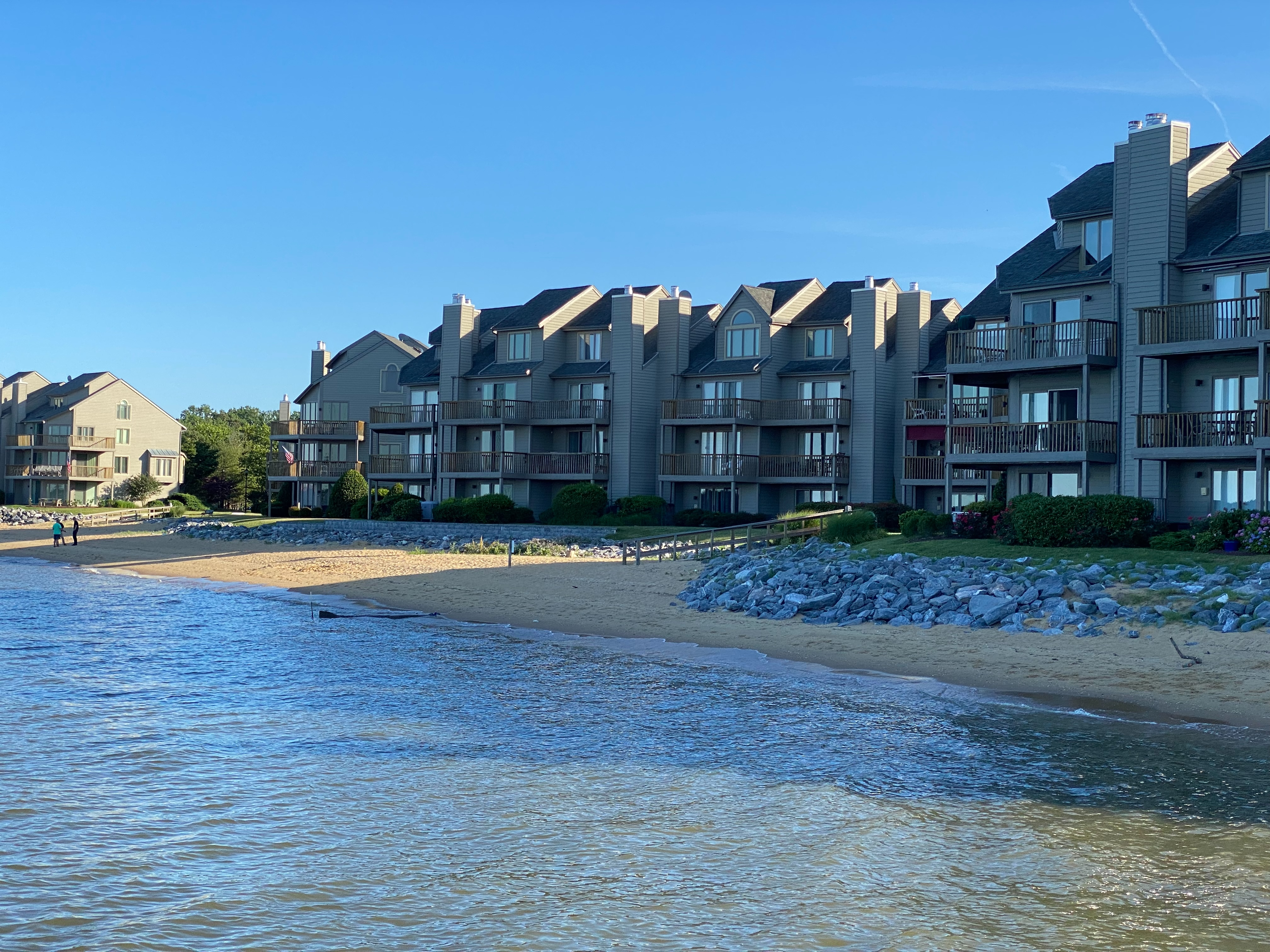
As of 2021, the luxury townhomes on Carr's Beach and Sparrow's Beach.

In August 2022, the City of Annapolis acquired five bay-front acres that included the remains of Carr's Beach, Sparrow's Beach, and Elktonia Beach. The acquisition was a result of collaborative efforts of the Blacks of the Chesapeake Foundation, Chesapeake Conservancy, the City of Annapolis, the State of Maryland, and The Conservation Fund.

Some of the acreage will be preserved for use as a public park.
