= The St. Augustine Record =

Newspaper in St. Augustine, Florida

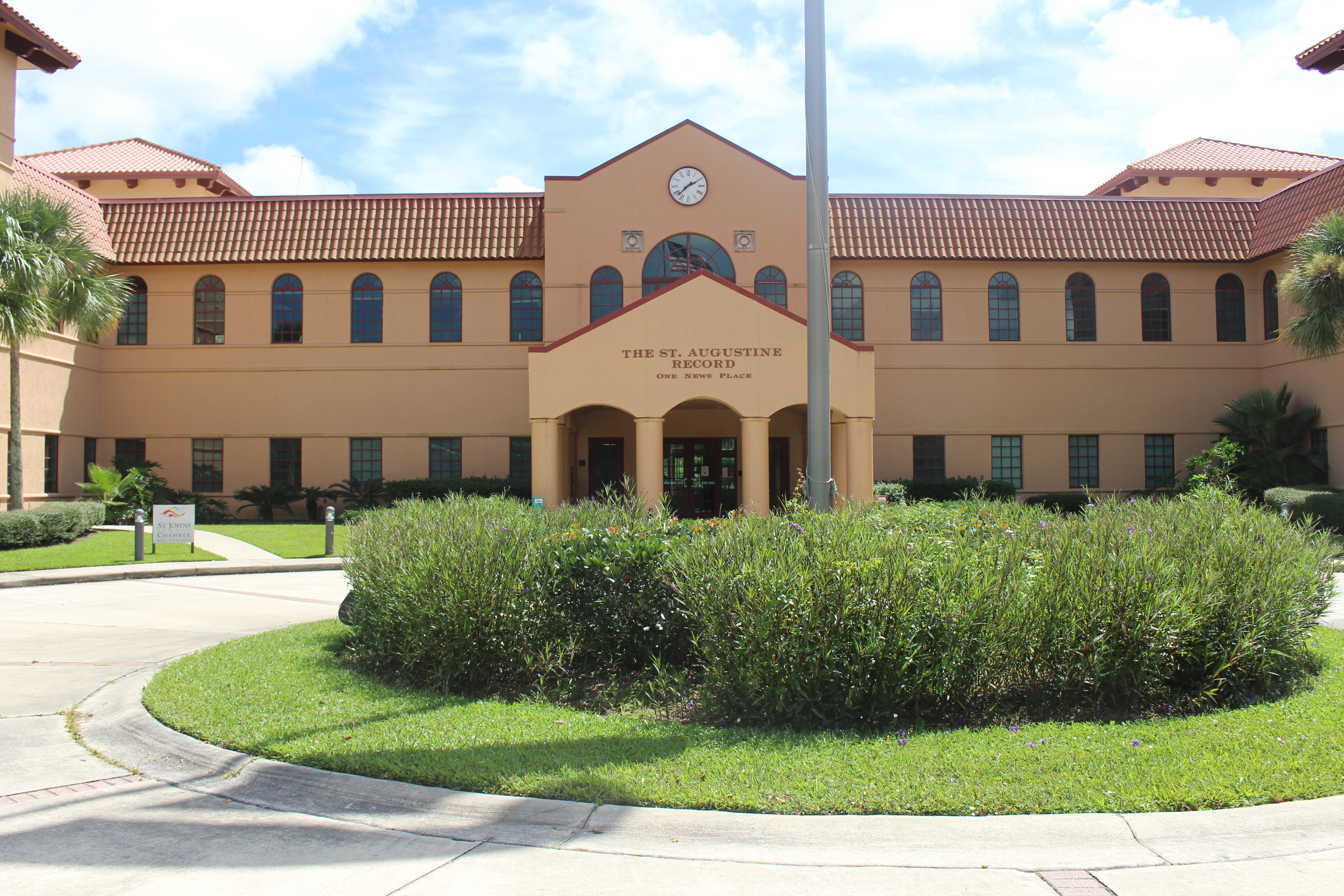
- Type: Daily newspaper
- Owner: USA Today Co.
- Founder: Charles F. Hopkins Jr.
- Editor: Craig Richardson
- General manager: Mark Cox
- Opinion editor: Jim Sutton
- Founded: October 21, 1894; 131 years ago
- Language: English
- Headquarters: St. Augustine, Florida
- Circulation: 7,475
- ISSN: 1041-1577
- Website: staugustine.com

The St. Augustine Record is a daily morning newspaper published in St. Augustine, Florida. The newspaper was founded in 1894 and is owned by Gannett as of November 2019.

During the 1920s the Record Company, as it was then named, published a series of well-regarded Florida county histories. Some of the counties represented in the series are Duval, Hillsborough, Escambia, Polk and Lake County. At least one, History of Duval County, Florida Narrative and Biographical by P.D. Gold was reprinted soon thereafter in a volume omitting the voluminous biographical section.
