= Lincoln Hills, Colorado =

Historic African-American resort in Colorado

Coordinates: 39°55′21″N 105°27′30″W

Lincoln Hills in Gilpin County, Colorado, the United States, was a vacation resort for African-Americans. Lincoln Hills was created in 1922 by E.C. Regnier and Roger Ewalt, and was the only resort for African Americans west of the Mississippi River. Lincoln Hills served as a reprieve from segregation for middle class African-Americans in the 20th century.

== Creation ==
By the 1920s, Denver, Colorado, had a thriving African American population living largely in the Five Points neighborhood. However, due to rising racial tensions in America and the presence of the Ku Klux Klan in Denver, many African Americans faced hostility living in Denver. Denver businessmen E.C. Regnier and Roger Ewalt co-founded Lincoln Hills Development Company (LHDC) in 1922. Regnier and Ewalt, both African American men, purchased over 100 acres 38 miles West of Denver. Regnier and Ewalt believed African Americans should be able to enjoy the mountain landscape and have a resort to escape the racial tensions of Denver. The men sold small land plots to African Americans which were usually 25 ft by 100 ft and had a price ranging from $5-$100. Many plots were used as campsites, however some families built rustic cabins. Regnier and Ewalt sold over 600 plots of land to middle class African American families who were located all across Colorado.

== Legacy ==
Lincoln Hills grew in size throughout the early 20th century and came to serve as renowned mountain resort for African American families. The resort served as the location for Camp Nizhoni, a YMCA girls camp that served African American women and girls who were prohibited from attending other YMCA camps due to segregation. Memoirs from Lincoln Hills describe the picturesque mountain landscape and the camaraderie that formed between many African American families who would return to the resort annually. During the Great Depression many African American families were forced to abandon their annual vacation plans. Moreover, the passage of the Civil Rights Act of 1964 allowed for the integration of African Americans into White resorts and clubs, thus Lincoln Hills had less of an appeal. Lincoln Hills officially closed in 1966.

In 1980 Lincoln Hills was placed on the National Register of Historic Places due to the unique opportunity it afforded African American families.

In 2007, Matthew Burkett purchased the resort to preserve it. Currently, the non-profit organization Lincoln Hills Cares operates youth and family programs at the resort to expand access to the outdoors to African American and Latino families in the Denver region.

== See also ==
- African American resorts
- Idlewild, Michigan, a similar resort known as the "Black Eden of Michigan".
- Oak Bluffs, Massachusetts, the only Martha's Vineyard town that welcomed black tourists.
- Borscht Belt, a series of resorts in the Catskill Mountains that accommodated Jewish vacationers who often found securing accommodation difficult due to widespread antisemitism.
