= Mosquito Beach Historic District =

Historic district in South Carolina, United States

- U.S. National Register of Historic Places
- U.S. Historic district
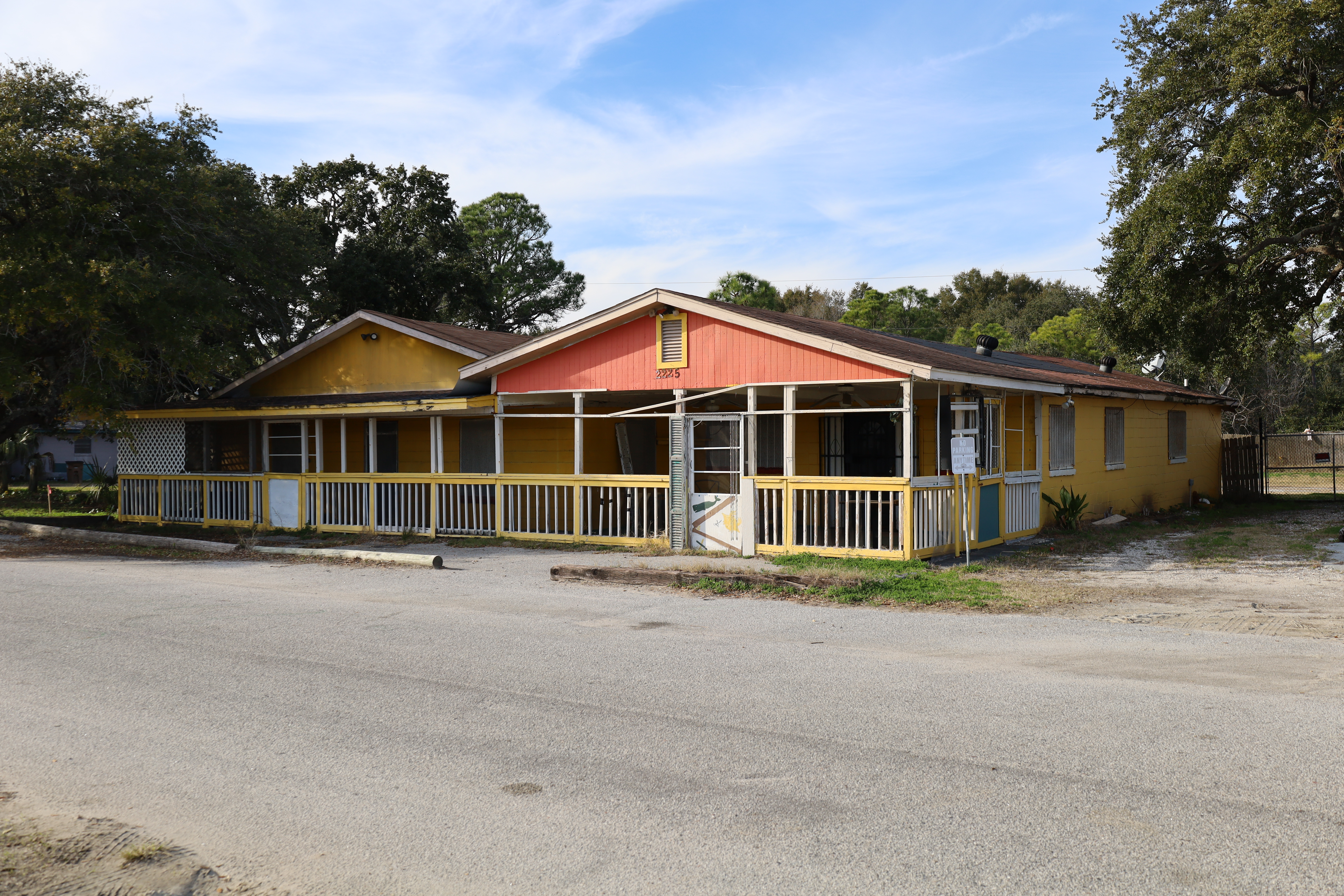
- Buildings in the district in 2021

- Location within South Carolina Location within the United States
- Location: Mosquito Beach Road, Charleston, South Carolina.
- Coordinates: 32.674109°N 79.981857°W
- Area: 8.36 acres (3.38 ha)
- NRHP reference No.: 100004409
- Added to NRHP: September 23, 2019

The Mosquito Beach Historic District located on James Island, South Carolina was the weekend destination for thousands of African Americans during the height of Jim Crow. It was added to the National Historic Register on September 23, 2019. The 8.36-acre site, located between two creeks, was formerly owned by a member of the Legare family. In the 1950s, African Americans began using the land, which was more akin to a dirt road on a creek rather than a natural beach, for recreation. The four structures and corresponding pavilions were a safe refuge for the community. Usage of Mosquito Beach declined after nearby Folly Beach was desegregated.

The owner of the Pine Tree Hotel, one of the remaining structures in the historic district, received a $490,000 grant for the restoration and renovation of the hotel from the National Park Service's African American History Civil Rights program in 2020. The structure was going to be almost completely rebuilt and further lifted to avoid floods in the area. However, on April 15, 2022, a fire destroyed the structure. Nonetheless, because the Historic Charleston Foundation was in the process of reconstructing it, "windows, roof trusses, and other materials" had already been removed and will be used for the reconstruction of the hotel.

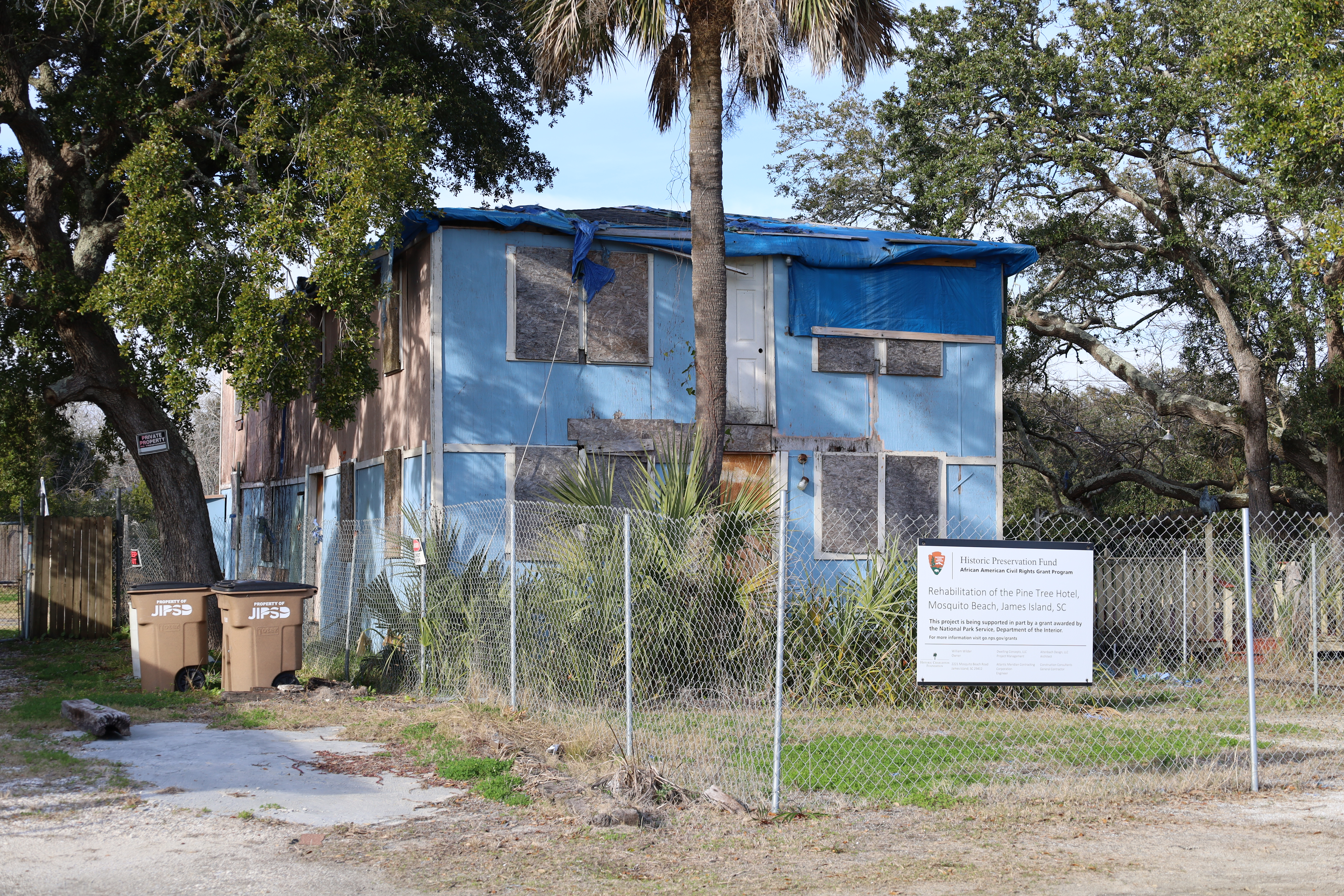
Pine Tree Hotel under renovation in 2021

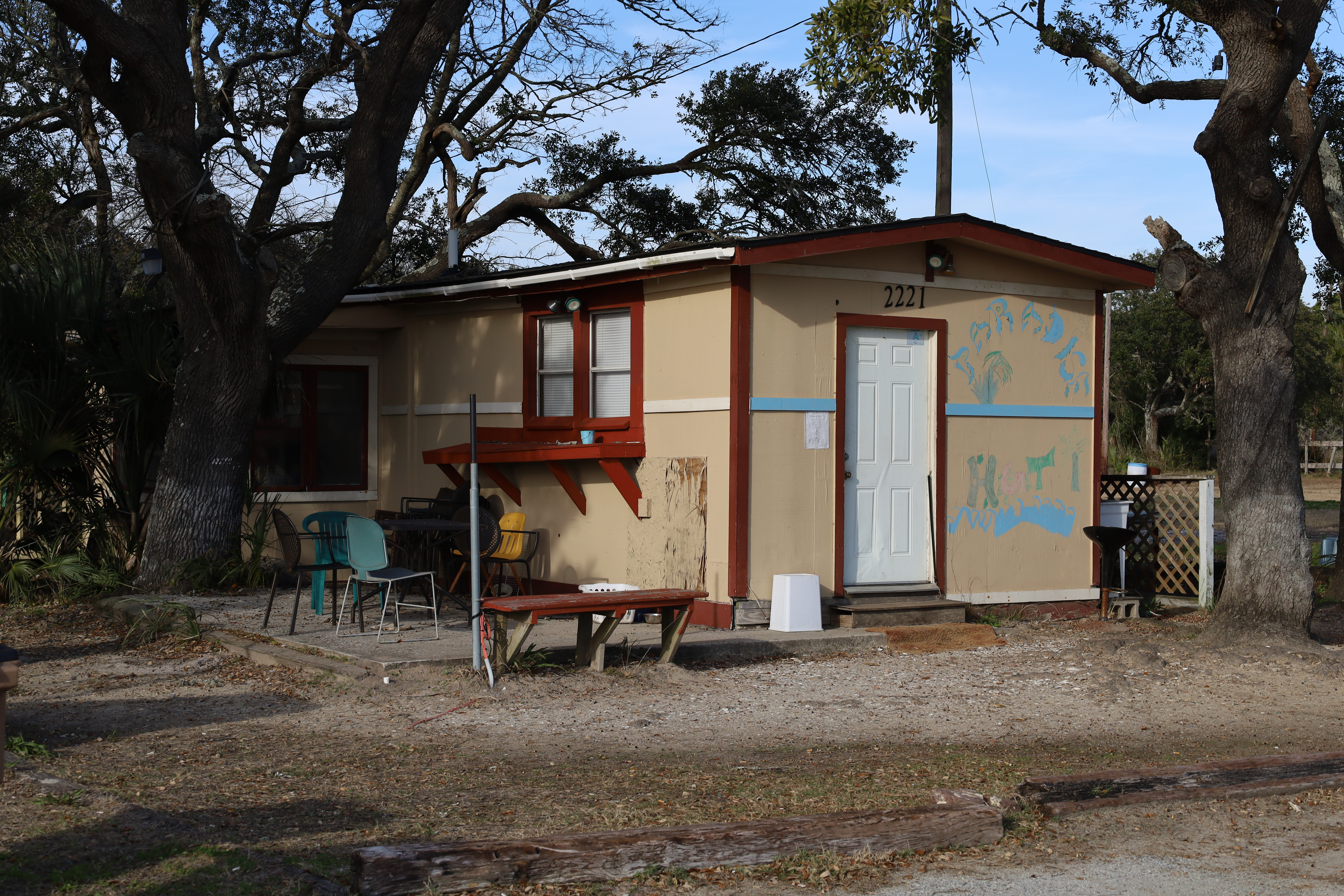
Building

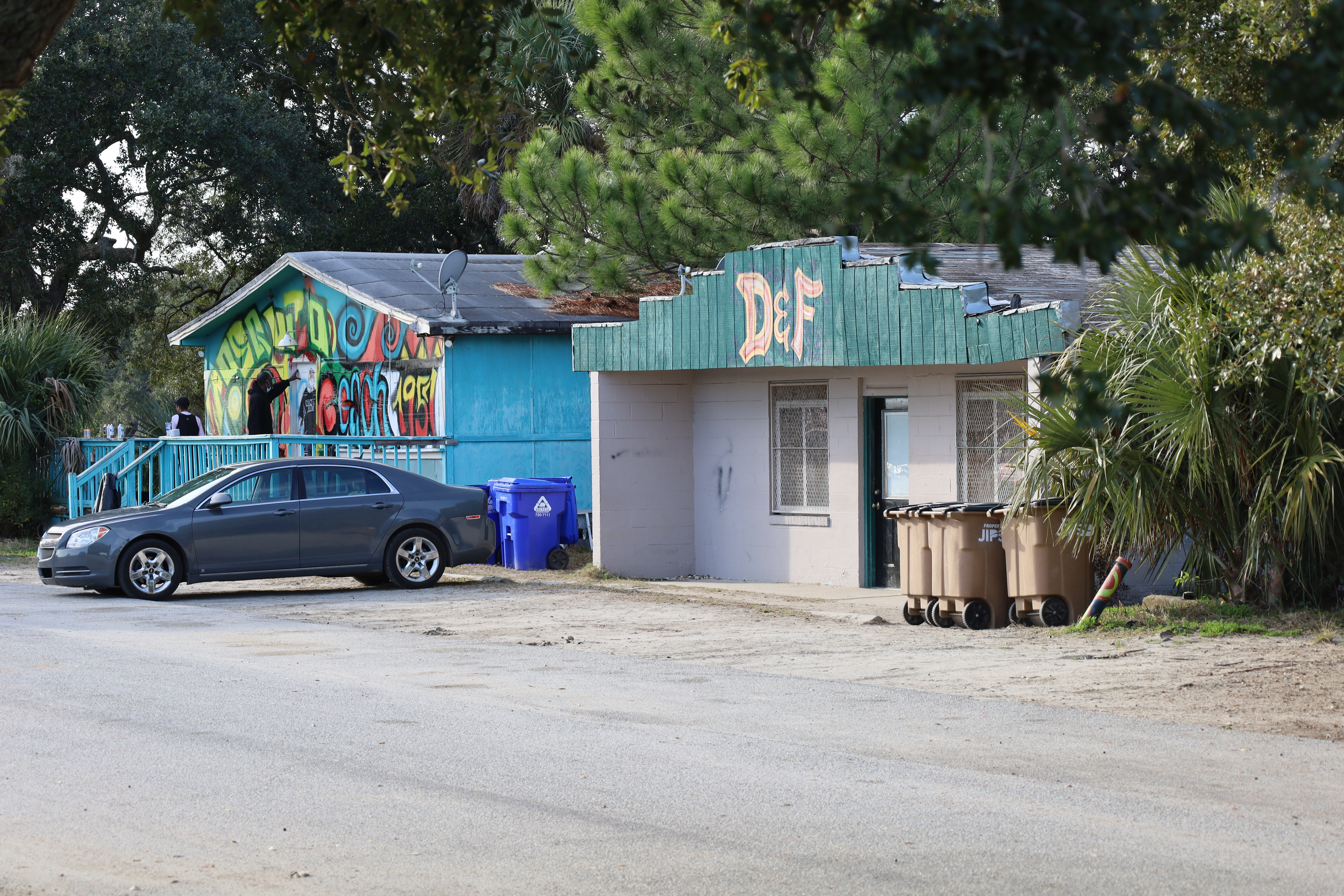
Buildings

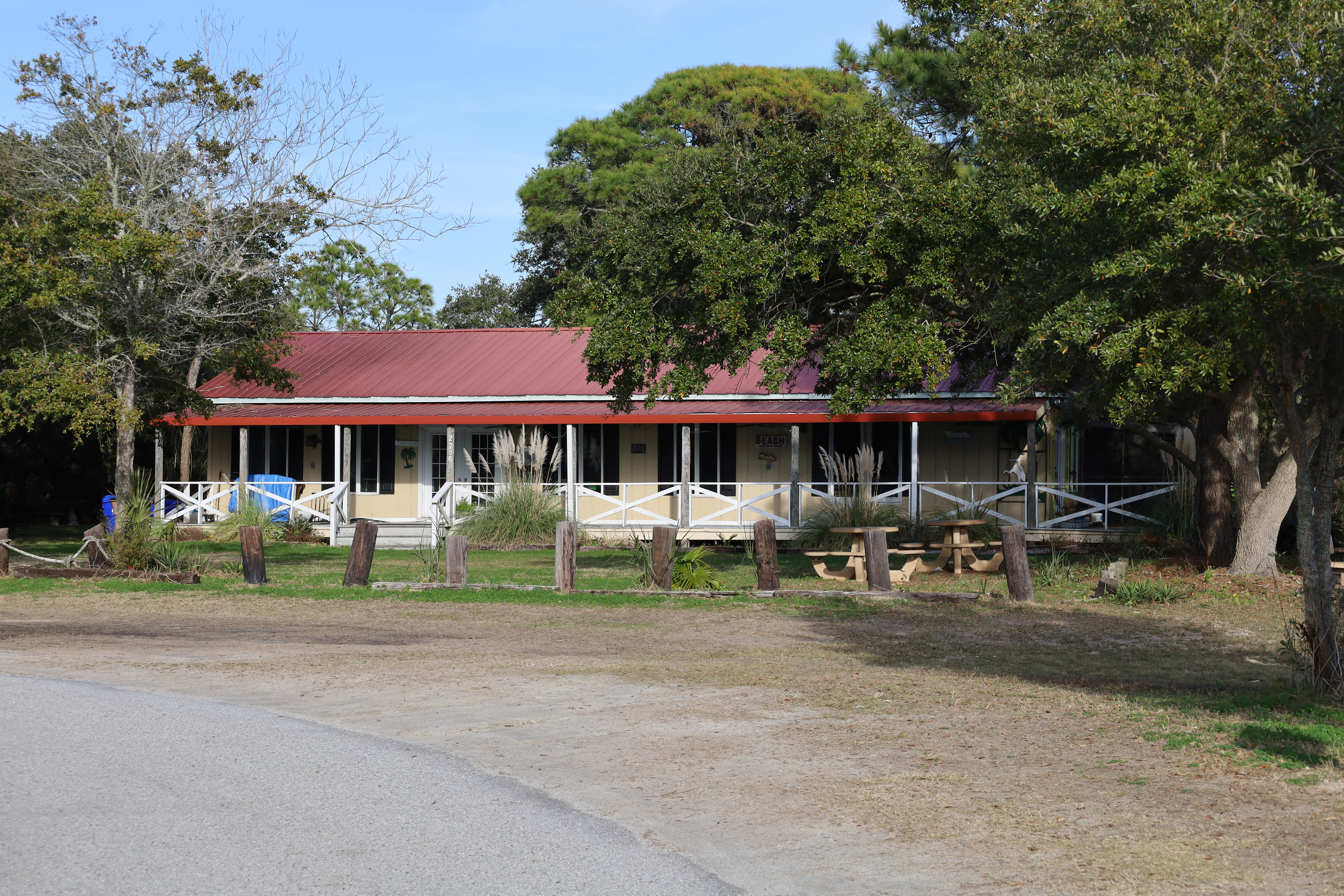
Building

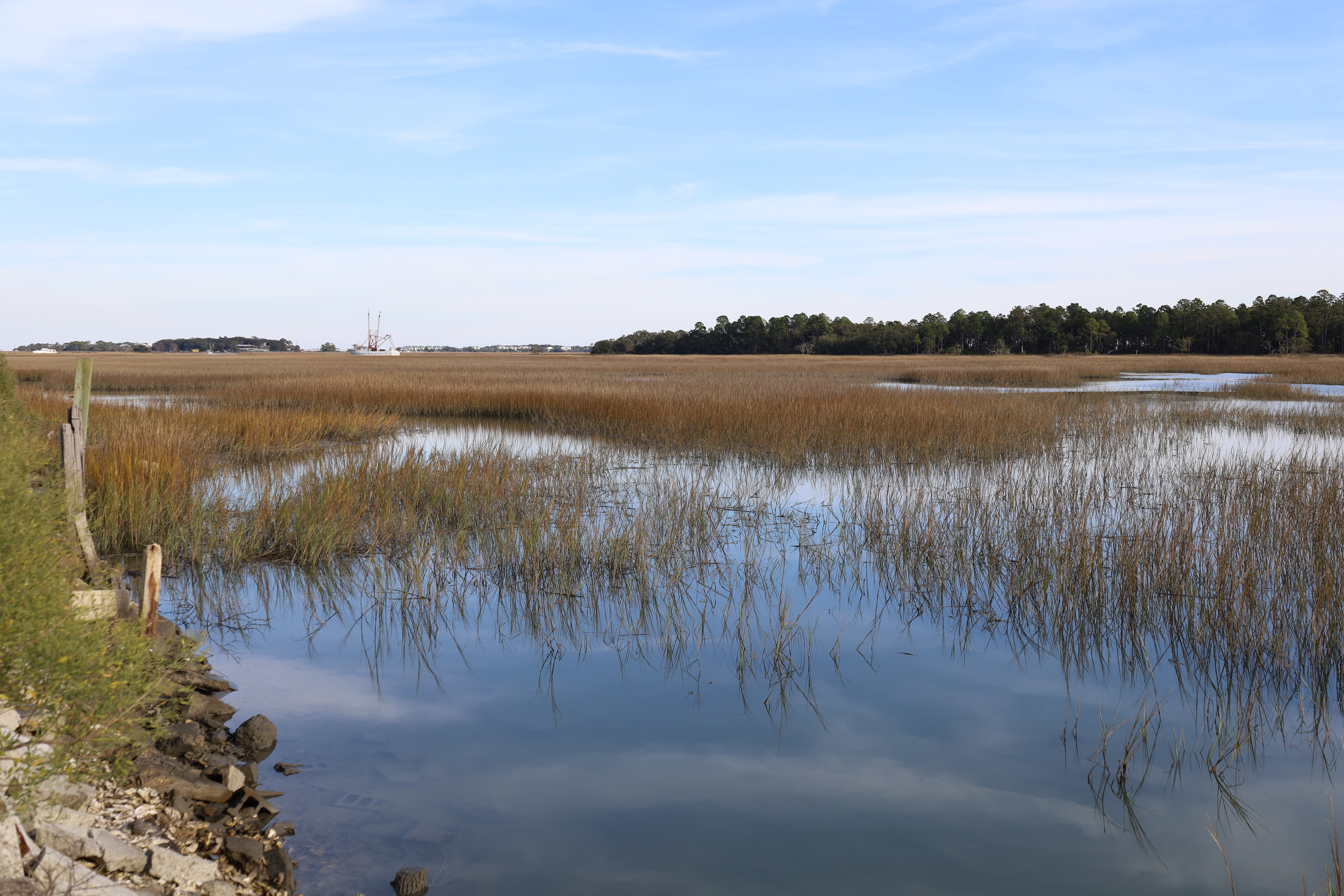
View from the district
