= Hill Top House Hotel =

Hotel in Harpers Ferry, West Virginia, U.S.

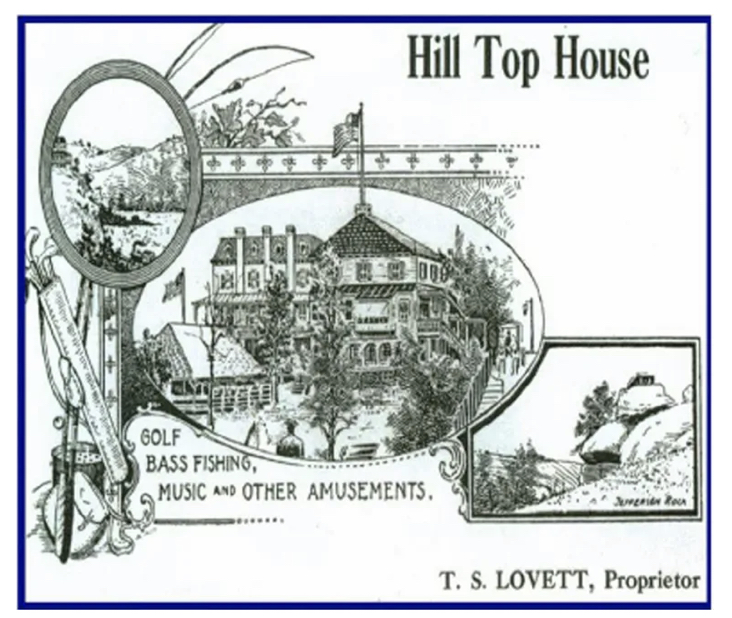
Golf, bass fishing, music and other amusements. Hill Top House, Harpers Ferry, WV, 1920s

The Hill Top House Hotel is located in Harpers Ferry, West Virginia. The original hotel was built in 1888 and operated by Thomas S. Lovett, an African-American graduate of Harpers Ferry's Storer College. The hotel, the college, John Brown's Fort, and the Island Park Resort and Amusement Park combined to make Harpers Ferry a center of African-American tourism and a frequent excursion from Baltimore and Washington, D.C.

With two structures lost to fire, but insured and rebuilt, the hotel operated until 2007, when it had deteriorated beyond reasonable repair. The rebuilding and reopening of the hotel, on a more luxurious scale, became a local issue.

== The original hotel (1888–2007) ==
=== An African-American-owned hotel ===
The hotel was opened in 1890 by owner Thomas S. Lovett, an African-American entrepreneur who had graduated from Storer College. At the time of its charter, it was the only college in West Virginia that would accept students of any skin color. However, by1870 the West Virginia legislature had outlawed integrated education.

As one of the few larger hotels in the U.S. owned by African Americans, located in a place of historic significance, where the end of slavery began, and a short train ride from Washington, D.C., the hotel experienced phenomenal success serving a White clientele.

=== Three iterations of the hotel ===
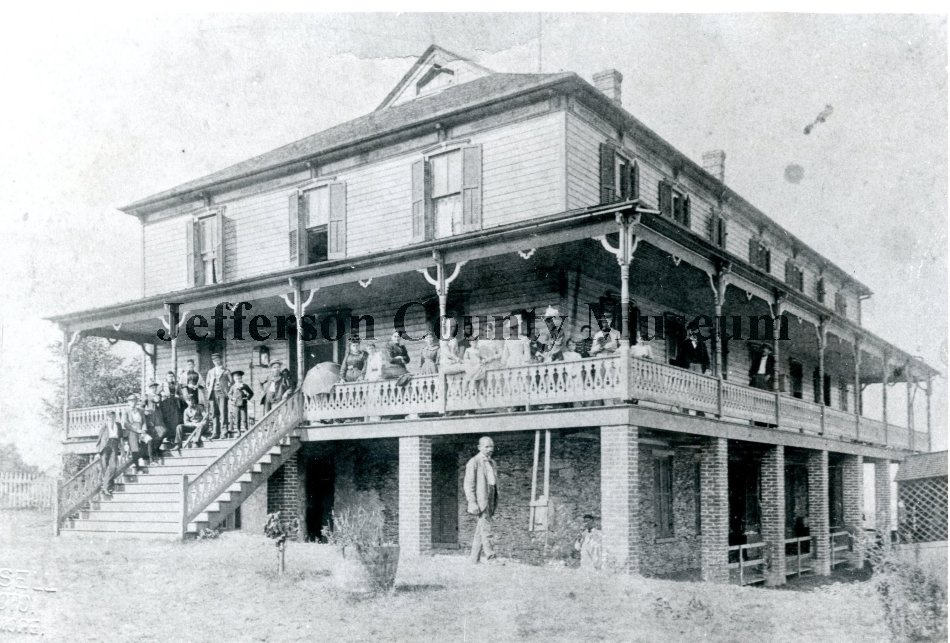
Hill Top House Hotel, Harpers Ferry, West Virginia, 1892–93. The proprietor, Thomas Lovett, stands alone at right.

The original frame structure, described as "the one real new building" put up in Harpers Ferry since the Civil War, was destroyed by fire in 1912,

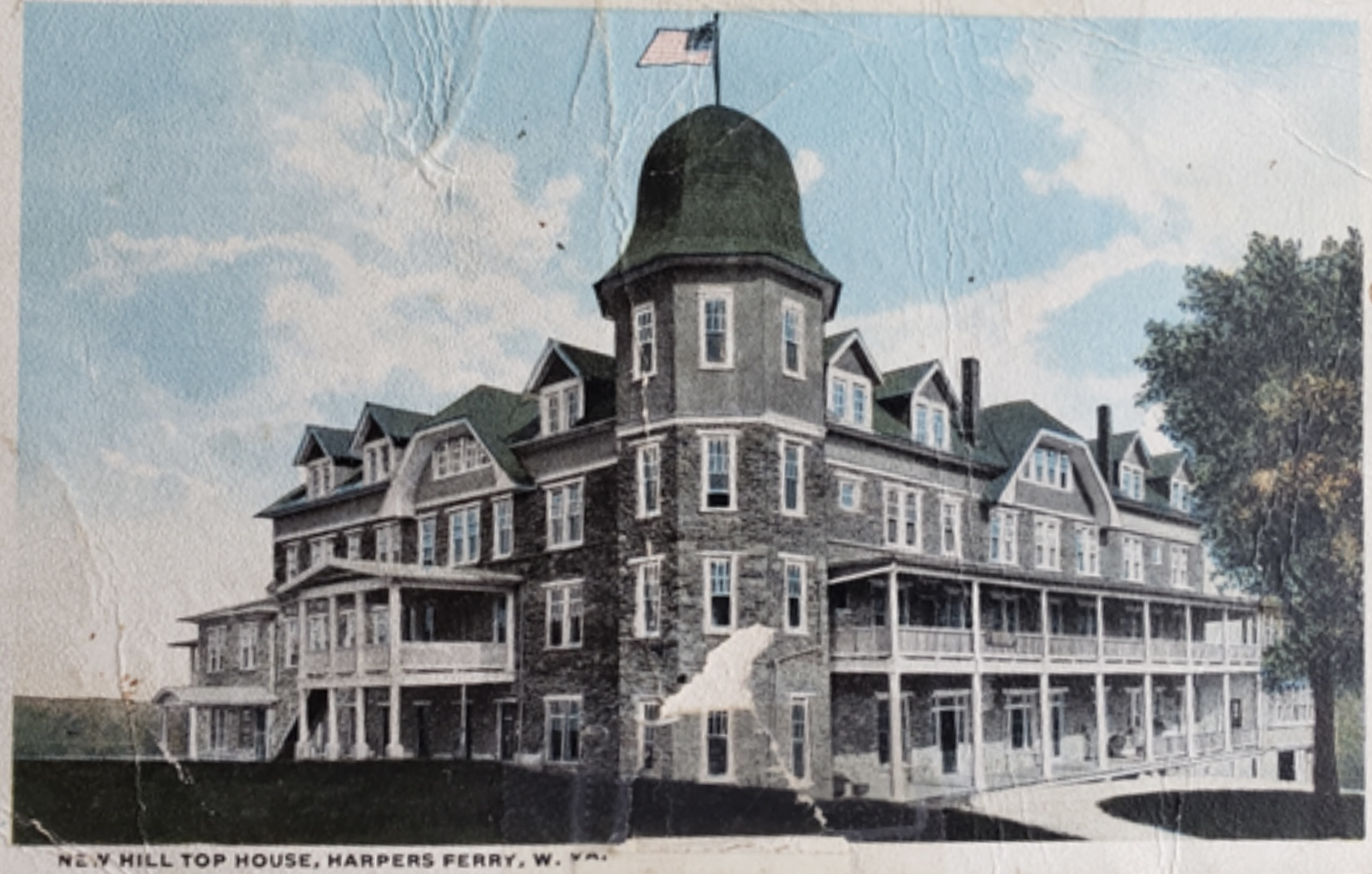
Second version of the Hill Top House Hotel, 1914 (4 stories)

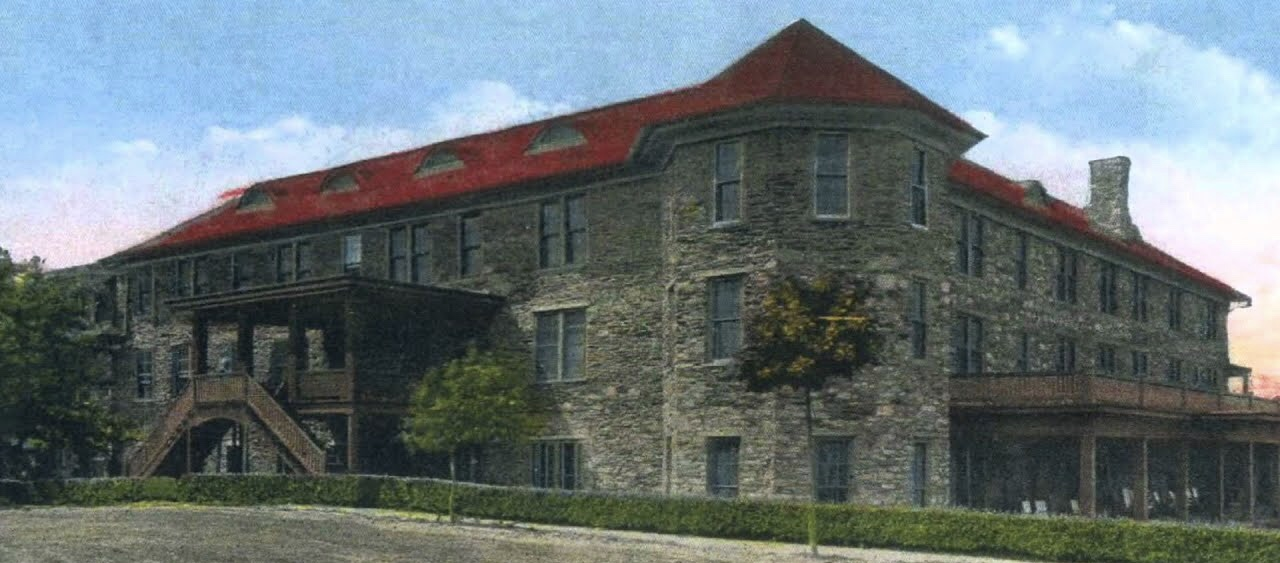
Third iteration of the Hill Top House Hotel, about 1924 (3 stories)

It was replaced by a larger partly stone building. This hotel, described in the report as "well known", was destroyed by electrical fire in June 1919.

Many pieces of the 1912 structure were used in the rebuilding. In 2006 it was still an active favorite of travellers. However, the condition of the hotel had deteriorated, to the point that it was forced to close in 2007.

=== Guests at the hotel ===
The hotel has been a part of the Harpers Ferry landscape and contributed to the area's allure and history. Luminaries who visited the Hill Top House Hotel include former Presidents Woodrow Wilson, Calvin Coolidge and Bill Clinton, as well as Vice President Al Gore, Mark Twain, Carl Sandburg, Alexander Graham Bell, Pearl S. Buck, W. E. B. Du Bois, and many others.

== The new hotel (indefinitely delayed) ==
External image
- Artist's conception of the final project (WV Metro News)

The condition of the hotel made its redevelopment using the existing buildings impossible, and they were taken down, saving and reusing the stones and tile from the original building. Rather than just a hotel, the project has become a conference center. It occupies the same footprint as the original hotel. The cost of the project has grown to $150,000,000. A cooking school is planned, with dining overseen by James Beard. As of 2023, it is projected to open in 2025.

According to Karen Schaufeld, “We’ll be putting it back up in approximately the same footprint of the original hotel and the dance pavilion that were there in 1914." As much as could be saved was preserved from the hotel site, which she said will be used in the new structure.

Due to cost overruns, an inability to secure additional funding, and a lackluster response to requests for taxpayer subsidization of the project, the project has been indefinitely postponed.

A fourth redesign of the project is being developed with the goal of being an economically cognizant alternative to the previous designs.

The reconstruction of the hotel became a divisive local issue and came to the attention of the West Virginia Legislature. Some locals oppose the hotel, conference center, and cooking school as overdevelopment for such a small village as is Harpers Ferry.

== See also ==
- Island Park Resort and Amusement Park
- John Brown's Fort
- John Brown's raid on Harpers Ferry
- Niagara Movement
