= Arundel on the Bay, Maryland =

Unincorporated community in Maryland, United States

Arundel-on-the-Bay
- Former village
- Nickname: AOTB
- Location within the state of Maryland Arundel-on-the-Bay (the United States)
- Coordinates: 38°55′11″N 76°27′46″W
- Country: United States
- State: Maryland
- County: Anne Arundel
- Time zone: UTC−5 (Eastern (EST))
  - Summer (DST): UTC−4 (EDT)

Arundel-on-the-Bay (also referred to as "AOTB") is a former post village and resort area in Anne Arundel County, Maryland, United States, located approximately 2 miles (3.2 km) southeast of Annapolis. Arundel-on-the-Bay is located on a peninsula known as the Annapolis Neck and is a peninsula in and of itself, bordered on the east and south by the Chesapeake Bay, and by Fishing Creek on the west.

Located near Highland Beach, Arundel-on-the-Bay was formerly an enclave of vacation residences and undeveloped property which attracted affluent African Americans when Jim Crow laws were in effect, when entrance to other resort areas was barred to non-whites. The community now holds approximately 345 homes. Arundel-on-the-Bay is a special tax district; each year a portion of property taxes are reserved by Anne Arundel County for improvements and maintenance of the shoreline.

The community owns a private beach and pier, boat ramp, and boat launch for community use.

The Thomas Point Lighthouse is visible and a short boat ride from the Arundel-on-the-Bay community beach.

Notable residents include Aris T. Allen, Jr., son of Dr. Aris T. Allen, the first African American chair of the Maryland Republican Party and Kurt Schmoke, former and first African American mayor of Baltimore.
