= Heal the Bay Aquarium =

Aquarium in Santa Monica, California, United States

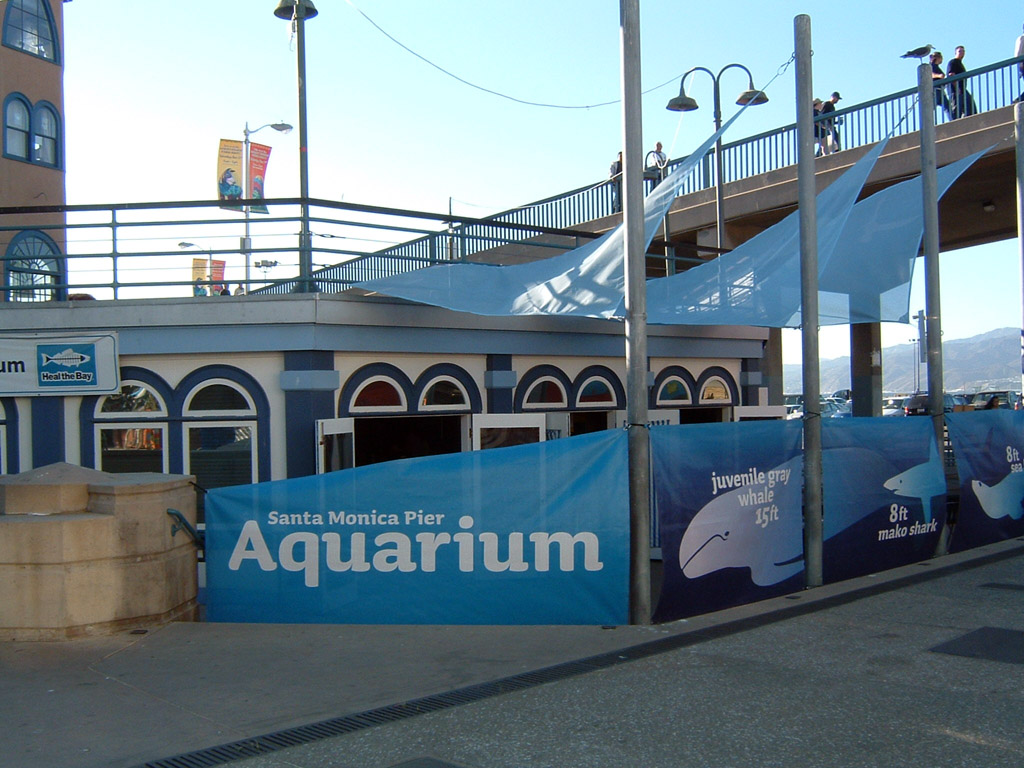
- Heal the Bay Aquarium beneath Santa Monica Pier is on beach that has been paved.
- Interactive map of Heal the Bay Aquarium
- 34°0′37.6″N 118°29′45.4″W
- Date opened: 1996
- Location: Los Angeles County, California, USA
- No. of animals: 717
- No. of species: 104
- Website: healthebay.org/aquarium

Heal the Bay Aquarium, previously named the Santa Monica Pier Aquarium, is a private-public aquarium at a California State Beach Park managed by Los Angeles County Department of Beaches and Harbors, located beneath the Santa Monica Pier, adjacent to the Pacific Ocean. Since 2003, it is operated by Heal the Bay, a nonprofit organization. It was formerly known as the Ocean Discovery Center and was operated by UCLA until 2003.

As Heal the Bay's marine education, advocacy, and community science facility, it is open to the general public and attracts more than 100,000 visitors from around the world per year (approximately 15,000 are students). This facility offers educational programs, activities, and special events dedicated to marine conservation, pollution prevention, and environmental education.

Species on display include:

Chordata: Sarcastic Fringehead; Swell Shark; Horn Shark; Leopard Shark; Round Stingray; Thornback Ray; Black Sea Bass; Garibaldi; California Moray Eel; Giant Kelp Fish; California Halibut; Shiner Surfperch; Blacksmith; Cabezon; Sargo; California Scorpionfish; C-O Turbot; Treefish	Arthropods: Sheep Crab; Kelp Crab; Hermit Crab; California Spiny Lobster; Molluscs: California Two-Spot Octopus; Red Abalone; Chestnut Cowrie; Kellet's whelk; Giant Keyhole Limpet; California Mussel; Norris's Top Snail	Echinoderms: Bat Star; Ochre Sea Star; Brittle Star; Purple Sea Urchin; Sand Dollar; California Sea Cucumber; Cnidaria: Club Tipped Anemone; Tube-dwelling Anemone

== Octopus incident ==
In February 2009 the two-spotted octopus managed to manipulate the pipe connection that takes care of draining the water tank. Two hundred gallons of water from the valve flooded the visitor space. The event received significant media attention.

== Gallery ==
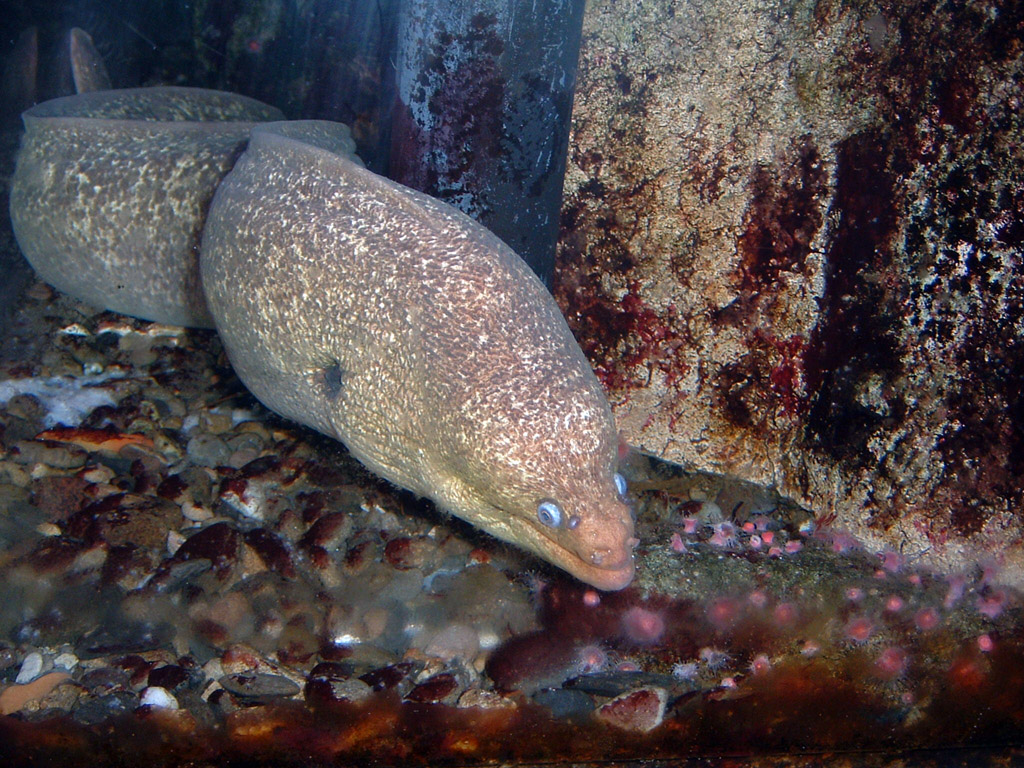
The California moray is one of the featured local species on display.

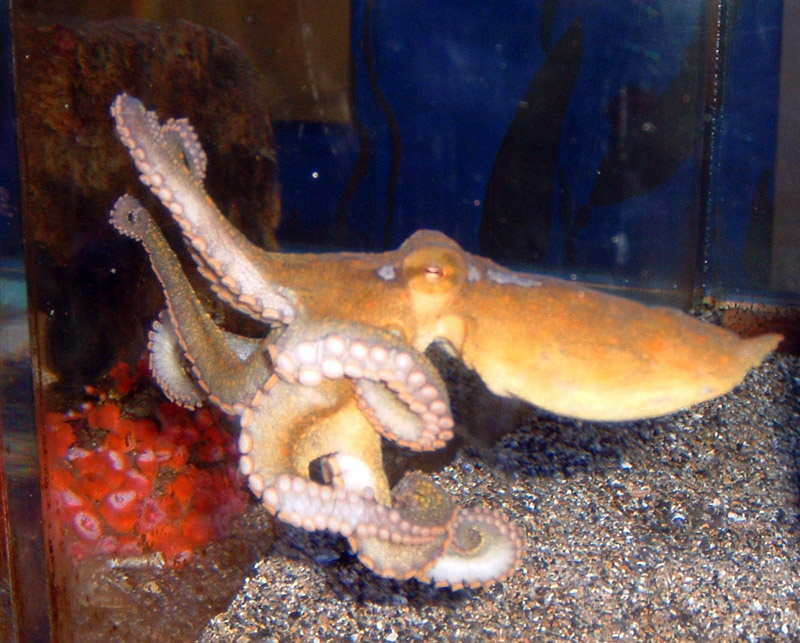
This California two-spot octopus is 3–4 months old.

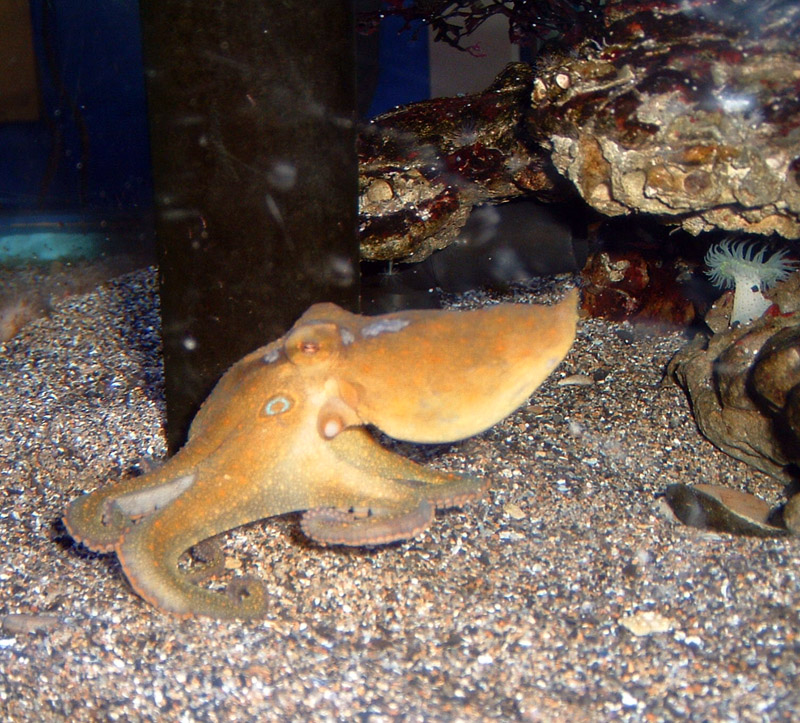
California two-spot octopus

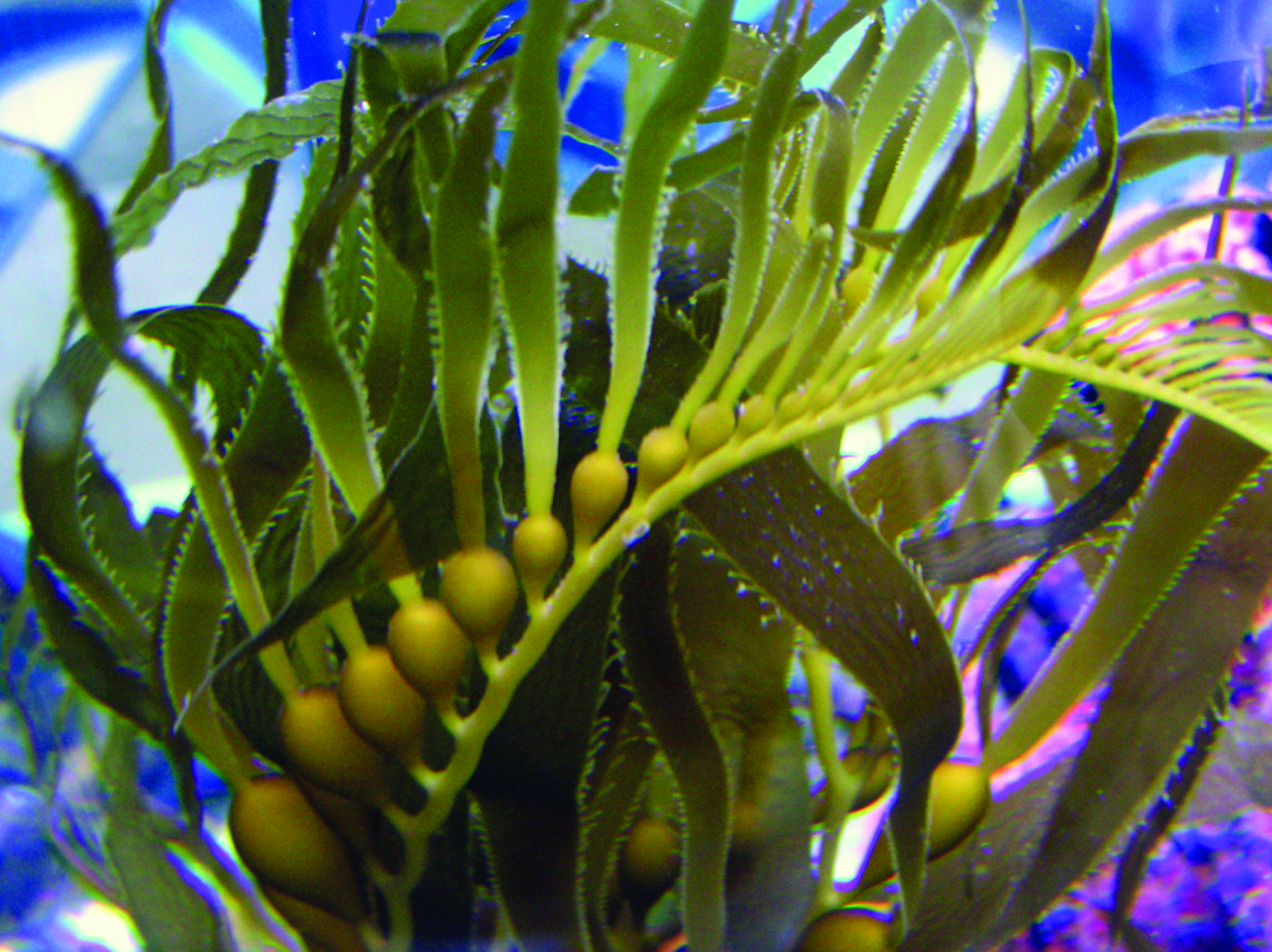
