= Santa Monica Pier =

Pier in Santa Monica, California, United States

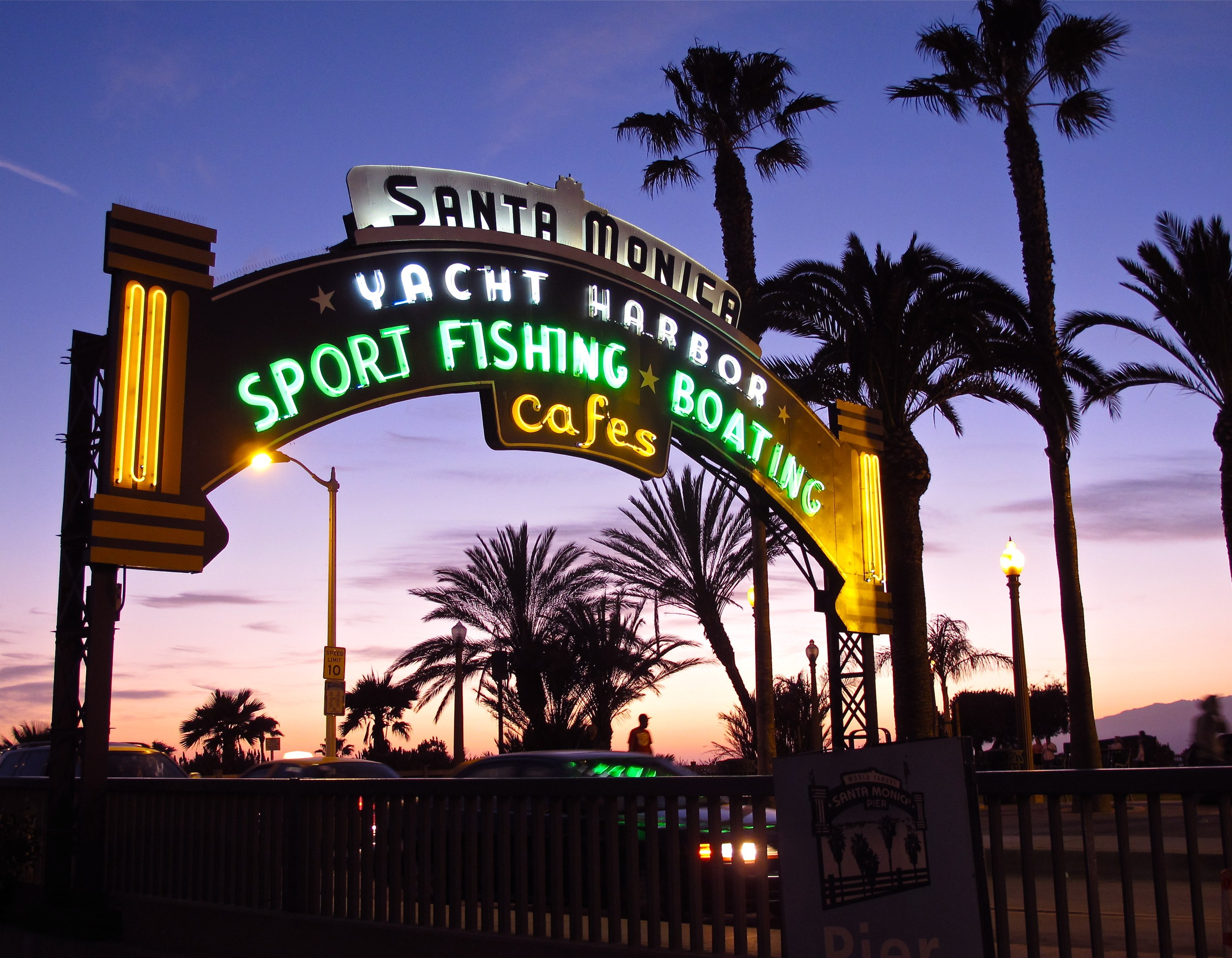
- Landmark entrance to the Santa Monica Pier
- Type: Amusement Pier
- Carries: Pedestrians
- Spans: Pacific Ocean
- Location: Santa Monica, California, U.S.
- Coordinates: 34°00′31″N 118°29′55″W
- Owner: Pacific Park
- Maintained by: Santa Monica Pier Corporation

Characteristics
- Total length: 1,651.5 feet (500 m)
- Width: 301.2 feet (90 m)
- Vertical clearance: 26 feet (10 m)

History
- Opening date: September 9, 1909; 117 years ago

Santa Monica Historic Landmark
- Designated: August 17, 1976

The Santa Monica Pier is a large pier at the foot of Colorado Avenue in Santa Monica, California, United States. It contains a small amusement park, concession stands, and areas for views and fishing. The pier is part of the greater Santa Monica Mountains National Recreation Area.

== Attractions ==
=== Pacific Park ===
The pier contains Pacific Park, a family amusement park with its solar panelled Ferris wheel. The brightly lit wheel can be seen from a distance and has been turned off during the Earth Hour observance.

=== Other attractions ===
It also has an original carousel hippodrome from the 1920s, the Santa Monica Pier Aquarium operated by Heal the Bay, shops, entertainers, a video arcade, a trapeze school, pubs, and restaurants. The pier's west end is a popular location for anglers.

The carousel, housed within the Looff Hippodrome, features hand‑carved wooden horses and is listed on the National Register of Historic Places.

The pier is a venue for outdoor concerts, movies, and other activities.

== History ==
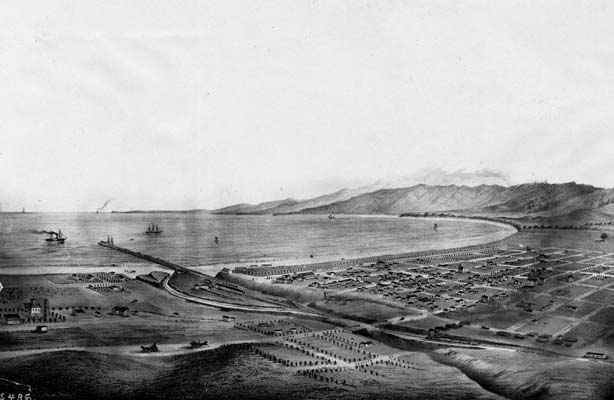
A sketch of Santa Monica and the pier, 1875

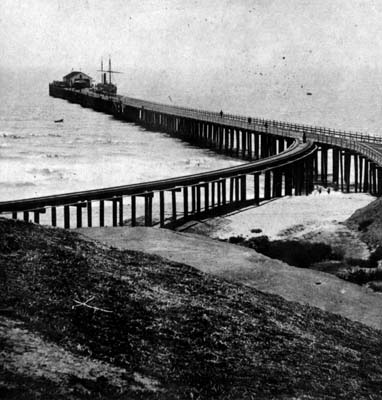
An early Santa Monica Pier, 1877

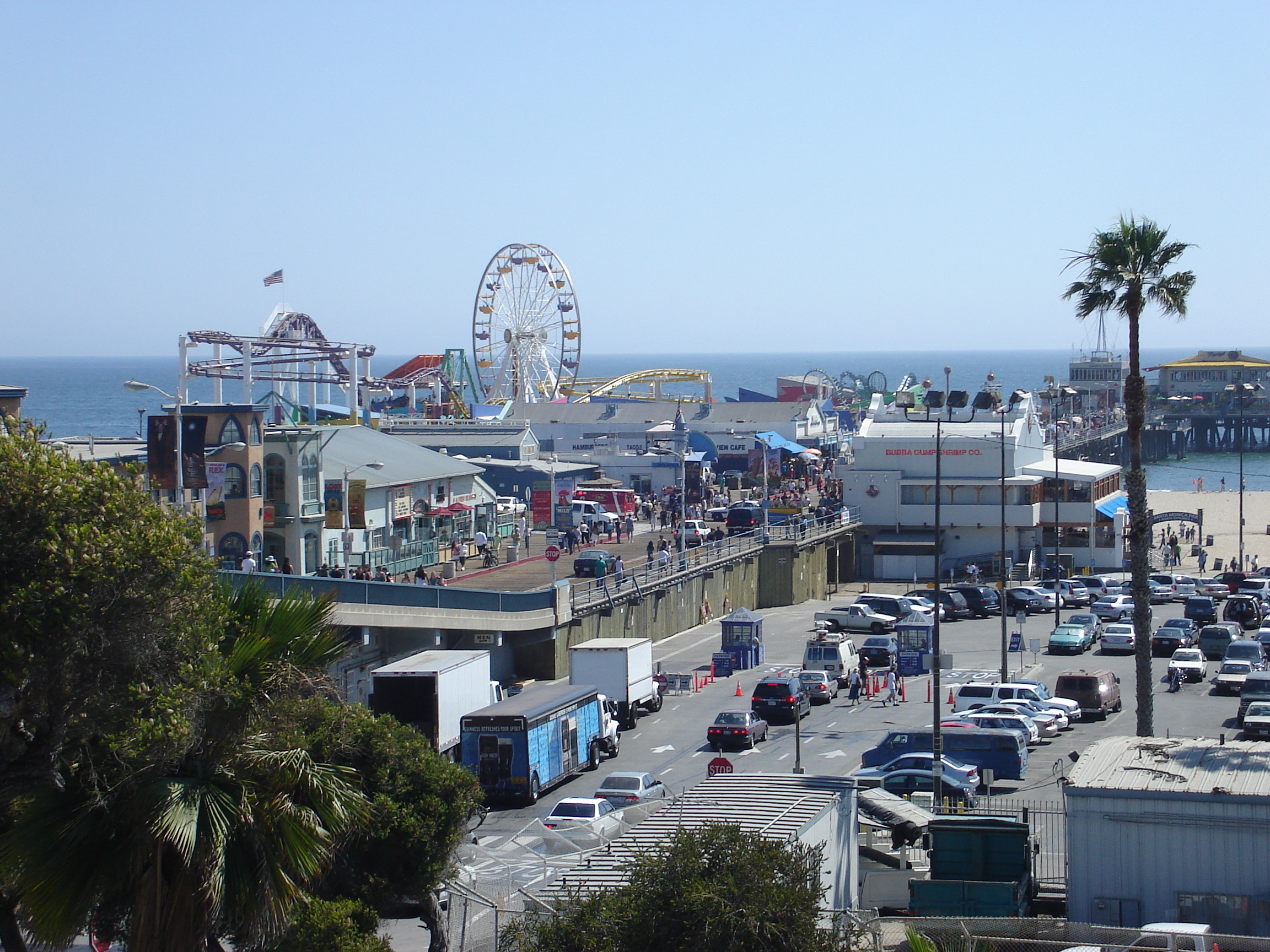
The pier with Pacific Park on the left, 2006

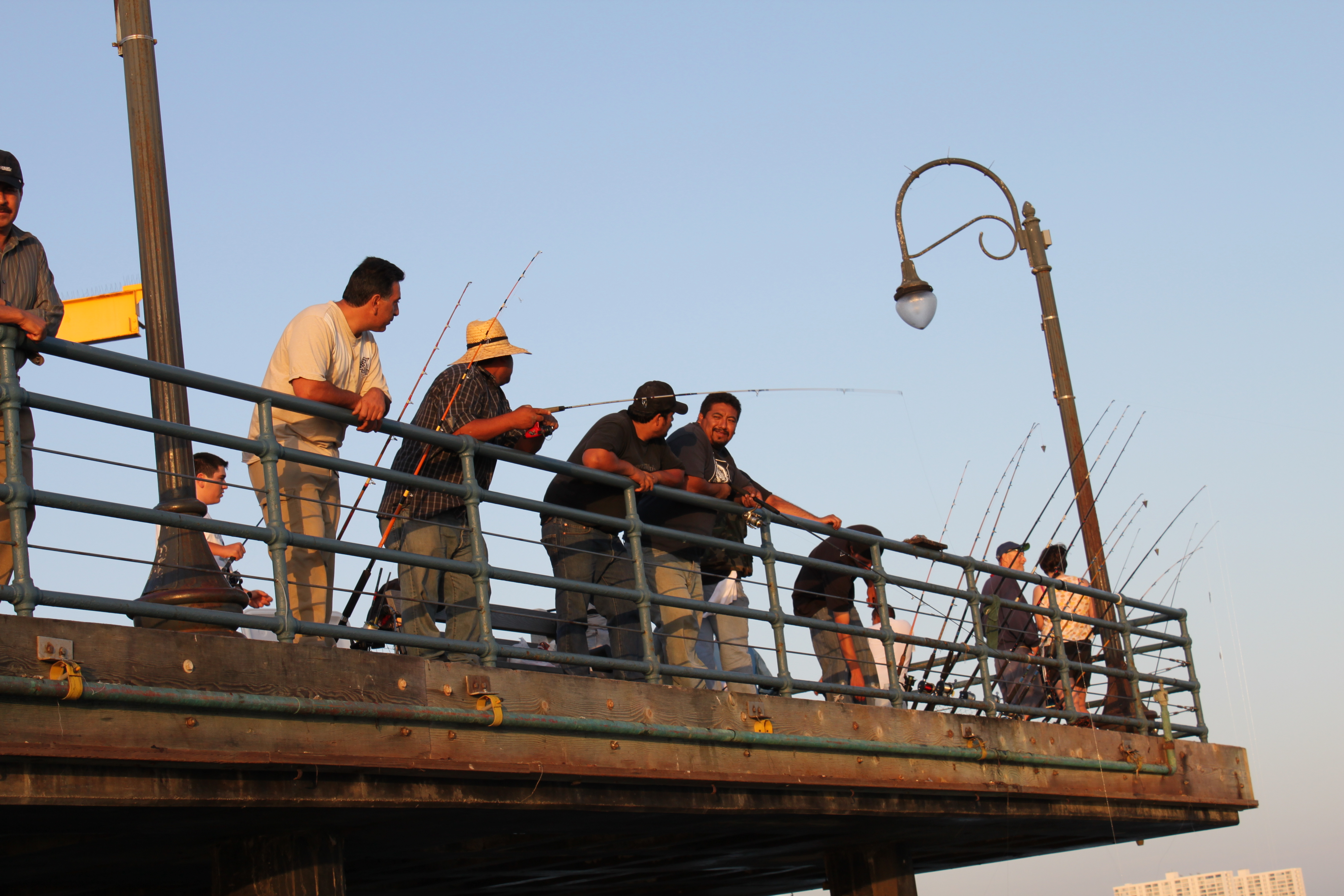
Anglers on the Santa Monica Pier, 2009

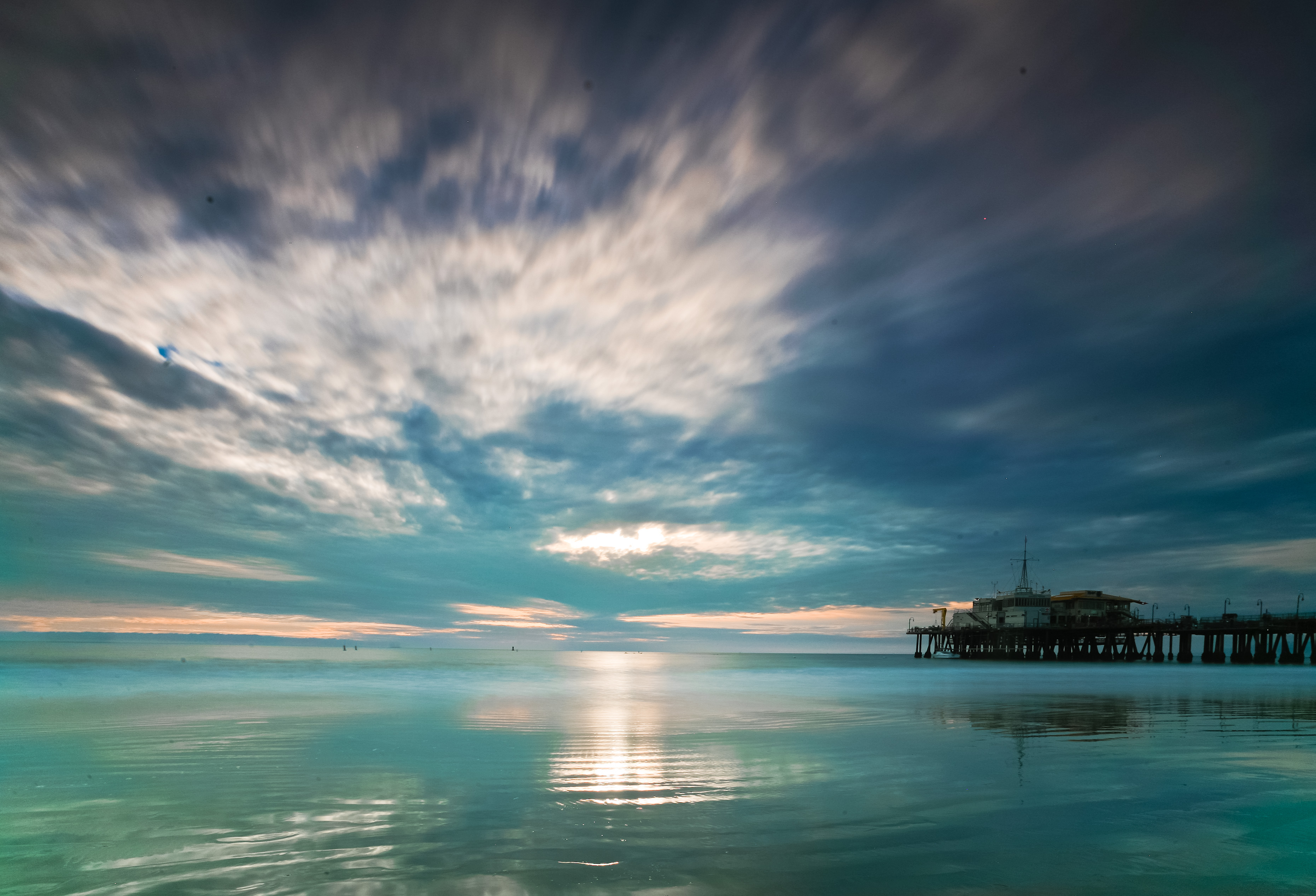
Santa Monica Pier at dusk, 2010

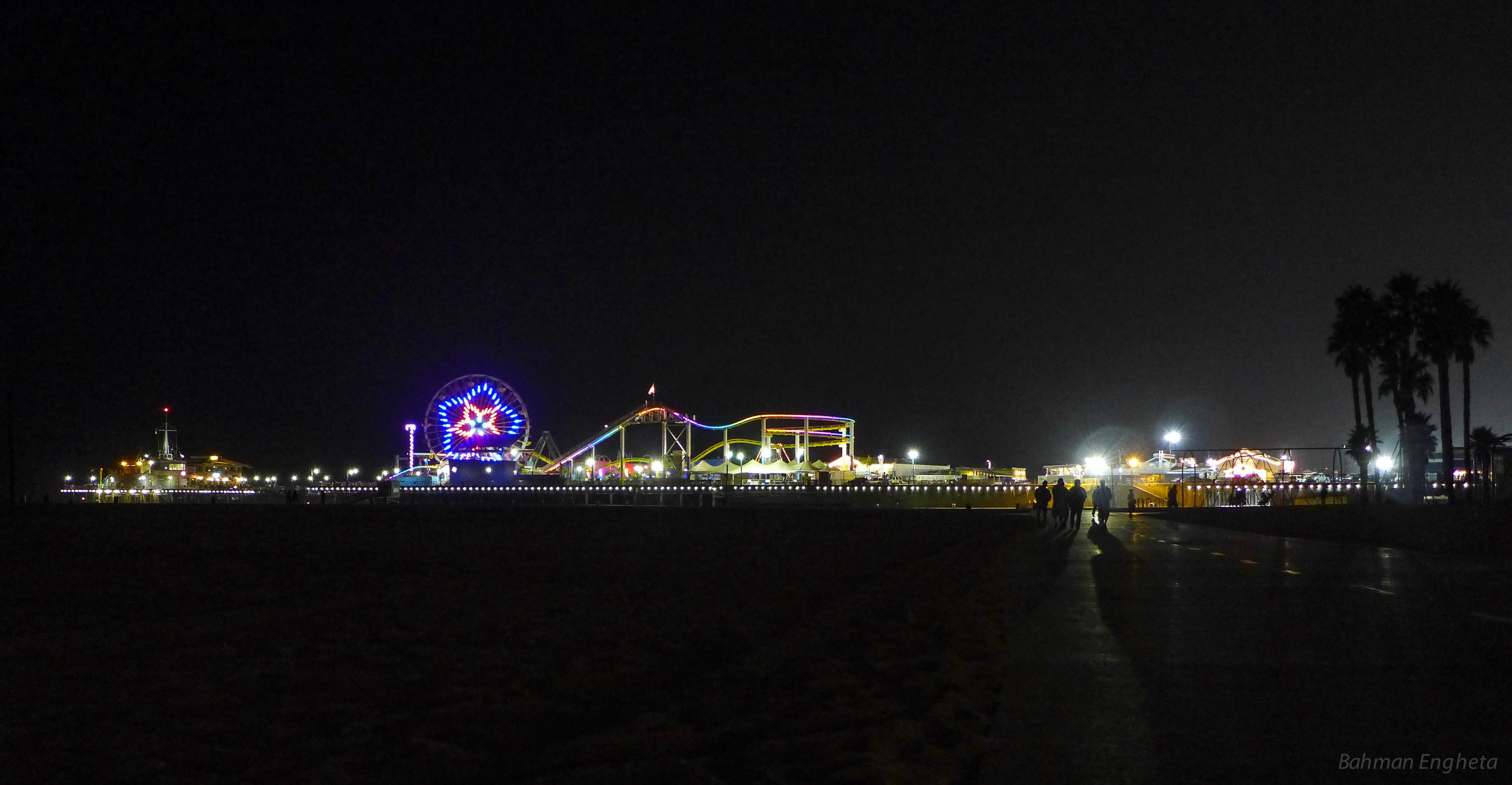
View of the pier and Pacific Park from the beach at night, 2012

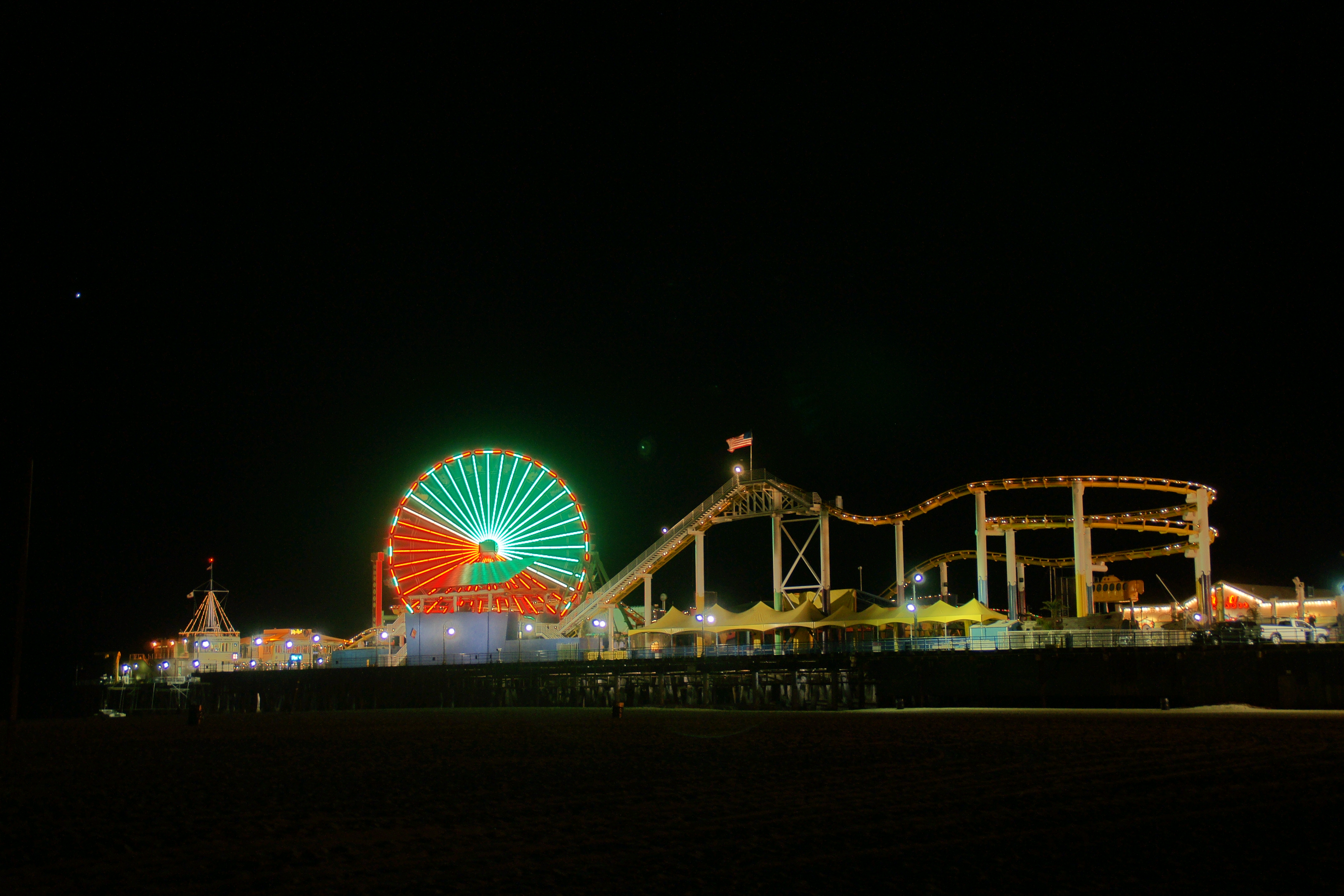
The Ferris wheel and roller coaster lights at night, 2009

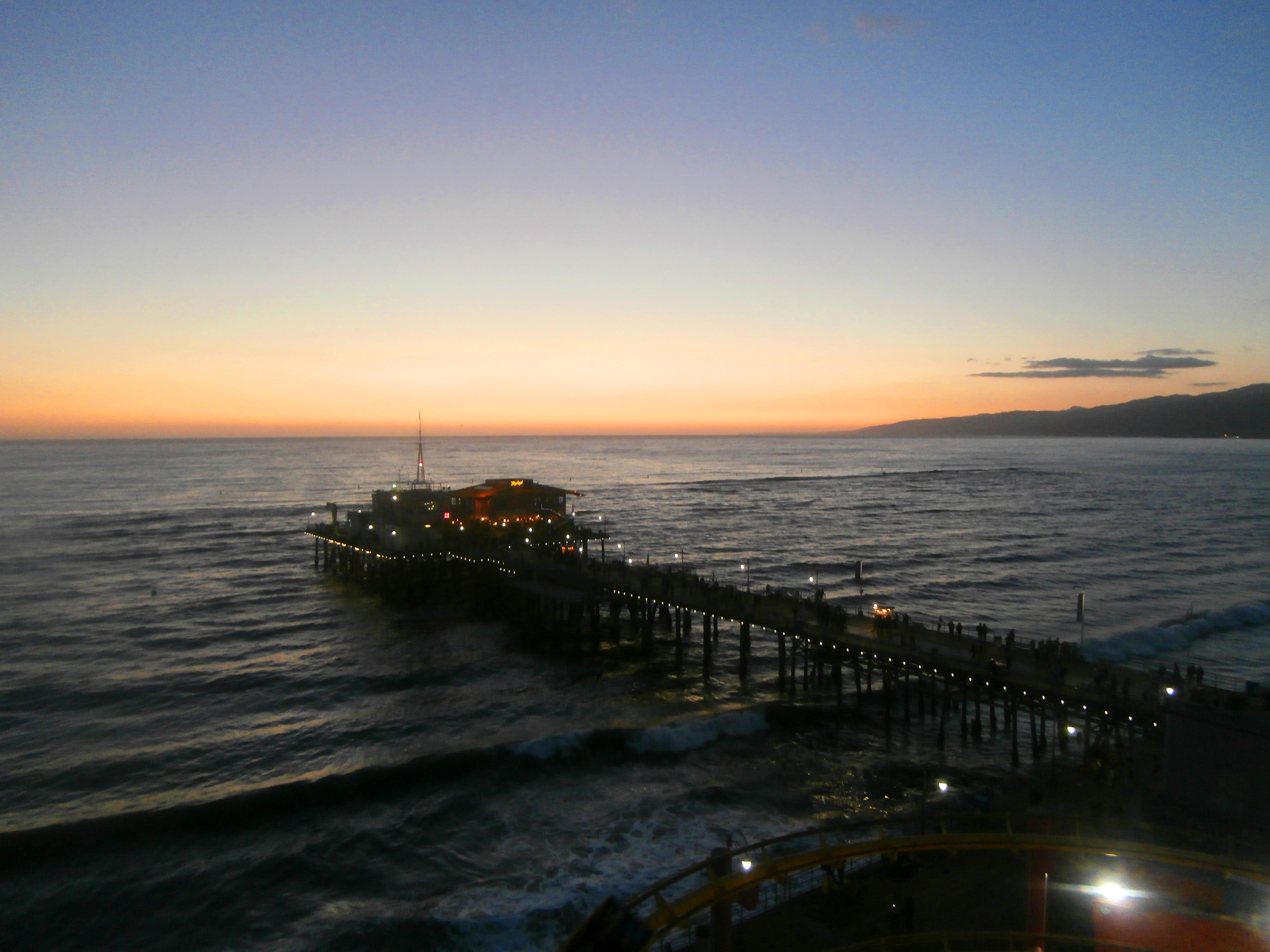
View of the Municipal Pier from the Ferris wheel, 2013

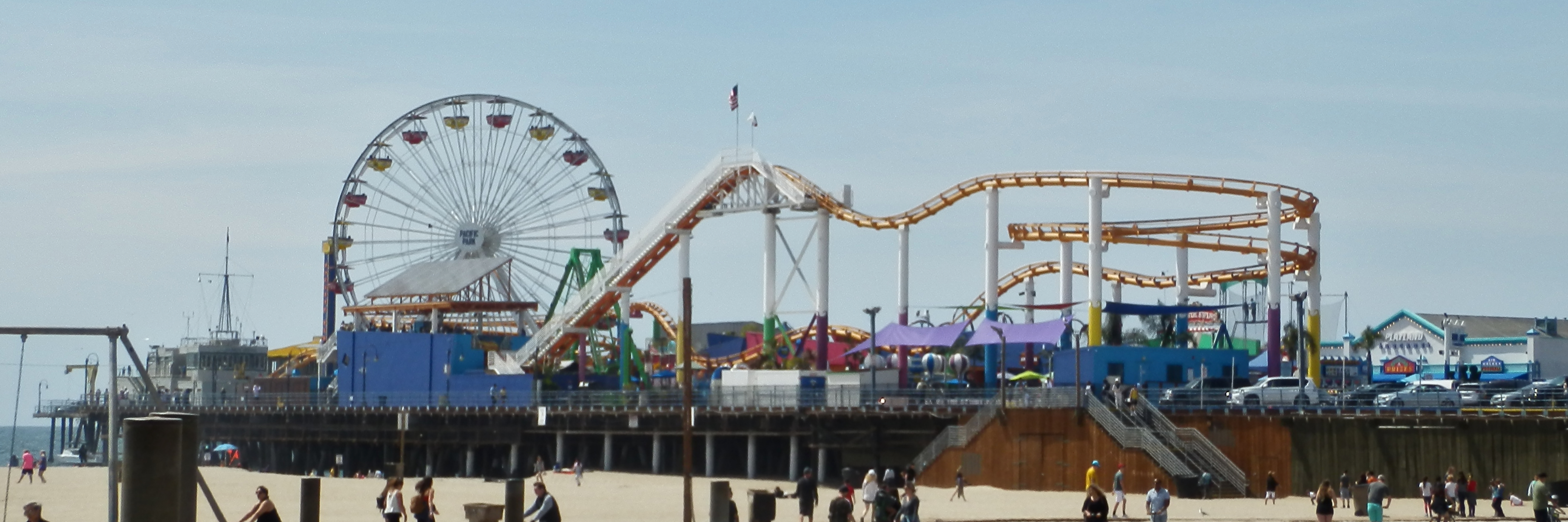
In 2018

Santa Monica has had several piers; however, the current Santa Monica Pier is made up of two adjoining piers that long had separate owners. The long, narrow Municipal Pier opened September 9, 1909, primarily to carry sewer pipes beyond the breakers and had no amenities. The short, wide adjoining Pleasure Pier to the south, also known as Newcomb Pier, was built in 1916 by Charles I. D. Looff and his son Arthur, amusement park pioneers. Attractions on the Pleasure Pier eventually included the Santa Monica Looff Hippodrome building (which now houses the current carousel and is listed on the National Register of Historic Places), the Blue Streak Racer wooden roller coaster (which was purchased from the defunct Wonderland amusement park in San Diego), the Whip, merry-go-rounds, Wurlitzer organs, and a funhouse.

The Philadelphia Toboggan Company built the Carousel, PTC #62, in 1922. It features 44 hand-carved horses. It was rebuilt in 1990 inside the Hippodrome. A calliope provides musical accompaniment.

The La Monica Ballroom opened on July 23, 1924. Designed by T. S. Eslick with a Spanish façade and French Renaissance interior, it was the largest dance hall on the west coast, accommodating 5,000 dancers on its 15,000-square-foot (1,400 m^{2}) hard maple floor. Country music star Spade Cooley began broadcasting his weekly television show from the ballroom in 1948, where the program remained until 1954. In the summer of 1955, the Hollywood Autocade opened at the La Monica with 100 famous and unusual cars, including Jack Benny's Maxwell and a Rumpler Drop Car. From 1955 to 1962, the ballroom served as a roller skating rink, first as Skater's Ballroom, and later as the Santa Monica Roller Rink, where the speed skating club won many state and regional championships and later Champion speed skater Ronnie Rains become a Roller Derby star. The rink's operator was Jack Goodrich, a former vaudeville and silent film star. The operator's daughter, Michelle Goodrich, later became a showgirl in the Ice Capades. The La Monica Ballroom was demolished in 1963 as a result of the Newcomb family waiting too long to start repairs.

The Pleasure Pier thrived during the 1920s but faded during the Great Depression. During the 1930s, most of the amusement park facilities were closed down and its attractions sold off. A breakwater was built in 1934 that provided docking for up to 100 fishing and pleasure boats near the pier.

The bridge and entry gate to Santa Monica Pier were built in 1938 by the federal Works Project Administration, and replaced the former grade connection.

The Newcomb Pier was privately owned until it was acquired by the city in 1974. During the 1960s and 1970s, various plans were proposed that would entail removal of the pier. The most extensive included the construction of an artificial island with a 1,500-room hotel. It was approved by the City Council, but citizens formed "Save Santa Monica Bay" to preserve the pier. The order to raze the pier was revoked by the city council in 1973. Within that same year, the Carousel and Hippodrome were locations for the film The Sting.

Storms swept away the protective breakwater in 1982. During storms in early 1983, the pier experienced a significant loss. On January 27, there were reported swells of 10 feet during this winter storm. When the storm was over, the lower deck of the pier was destroyed. The City of Santa Monica began repairs on March 1, 1983, when another storm rolled in. A crane which was being used to repair the west end was dragged into the water and acted as a battering ram against the pilings. Over one-third of the pier was destroyed.

On May 25, 1996, the Santa Monica Pier welcomed Pacific Park, the first new attraction since the 1930s. Construction began on December 2, 1994 and ended in February, 1996.

On June 18, 2009, the California Office of Environmental Health Hazard Assessment issued a safe eating advisory for any fish caught from Santa Monica Pier to Ventura Harbor due to elevated levels of mercury and PCBs.

On October 9, 2023, part of the pier was forced to evacuate after a man who claimed to have a bomb climbed onto the Ferris wheel at Pacific Park. He was then arrested and taken into custody.

== Management ==
The City of Santa Monica created a non-profit in response to the damage and called it Santa Monica Pier Restoration Corporation (SMPRC). SMPRC is headquartered on Hippodrome's second floor, with former apartments being converted into offices, and conducted the daily operations of the Santa Monica Pier, such as managing events, filming, promotions, tenants, and street performers. SMPRC has produced the Santa Monica Pier Paddle Board Race and the Twilight Summer Concert Series. In 2011, SMPRC changed the company name to the Santa Monica Pier Corporation (SMPC).

== In popular culture ==
=== Books ===
- In the popular book series The Dark Artifices by Cassandra Clare, the fictional Los Angeles Institute overlooks the Santa Monica Pier. Most of the major plot is set in this vicinity.
- My Life Above the Carousel in Santa Monica: This is a memoir by Elaine Jones Stephenson about her life living in an apartment above the carousel on the pier during the post-WWII era. It details her experiences with the pier's attractions, the surrounding community, and the activities of the time.

=== Songs ===
- Kay Kyser's Campus Cowboys - "When Veronica Plays the Harmonica (On the Pier at Santa Monica)" (1946)
- Noel Harrison - "Santa Monica Pier" (1968)
- The Beach Boys - "Strange World" (2012)
- Hayley Kiyoko - "Curious"

=== Films ===
The Santa Monica Pier lies within the studio zone; consequently, it has been used as a filming location for many decades. The amusement park attractions as they existed in 1930s are seen prominently in the Our Gang short Fish Hooky (1933). It also appears prominently in Tillie's Punctured Romance (1914), Quicksand (1950), Elmer Gantry (1960), 1941 (1979 film), The Opposite of Sex (1998), They Shoot Horses, Don't They? (1969), Night Tide (1961), Bean (1997), The Sting (1973), Farewell, My Lovely (1975) with Robert Mitchum, Her (2013), A Night at the Roxbury (1998), Mighty Joe Young (1998), Miracle Beach, Forrest Gump (there is a Bubba Gump Shrimp Company Restaurant on the pier), Not Another Teen Movie, Iron Man, Desperate Teenage Lovedolls, Dark Ride, Cellular, The Hottie and the Nottie, Falling Down, Ruthless People (the pier is the site of the movie's climactic final scene), Love Stinks, Hancock, The Happytime Murders, Sharknado, the indie romantic comedy She Wants Me, and Hannah Montana: The Movie (the scene with Lilly's birthday party). During the earthquake in the movie 2012, the pier can be seen sinking beneath the waves. The Natalie Wood film Inside Daisy Clover (1965) features the pier in the beginning of the picture. The pier was also featured in the 2012 film version of Rock of Ages. The Glenn Miller Story with Jimmy Stewart has a sequence toward the beginning where he goes to the La Monica Ballroom for an audition. The pier is also featured in the 2018 film Pacific Rim Uprising, starring John Boyega, where a kaiju attack destroys the pier (as well as the entire city). Jack Dawson in Titanic references the pier, which would have been just three years old in 1912, when the ship sank. The 1995 movie The Net features the pier when Angela Bennet visits the pier to meet a character online who can potentially help her.

=== Television ===
- The Girl from U.N.C.L.E., "The Mother Muffin Affair" (1966), though set in London, climax features action scene on the carousel, the arcade room, and several pier locations.
- The Mod Squad, "Home Is in the Streets", Season 4, Episode 3 (1971).
- The Rockford Files Season 1, episode 1. In the series' opening scene, a city bus pulls up alongside the pier in the adjacent parking lot.
- Columbo, in "The Most Crucial Game", the private detective Dobbs goes to meet Columbo at a restaurant ("Ocean Side East Cafe") at the end of the pier on the lower deck.
- Charlie's Angels episodes "The Sandcastle Murders" and "Angels in Waiting".
- The Incredible Hulk episode "King of the Beach" was filmed there.
- Three's Company, in the opening titles of the fourth and fifth seasons.
- Star Trek: Voyager features an episode in which the pier is in the 20th century Los Angeles.
- South Park episode "Fishsticks" ends with Kanye West jumping off the Santa Monica Pier to begin a new life as a gay fish.
- The Tonight Show with Jay Leno commercial bumper
- South of Nowhere, in the opening credits and in the episode "Girls Guide to Dating".
- The Suite Life of Zack & Cody episodes "The Suite Life Goes to Hollywood Pts. 1/2".
- Life After People episode "Waves of Devastation"
- Rocket Power features a pier very similar to the Santa Monica Pier.
- The Amazing Race: Santa Monica Pier was the Starting Line for the fifth season.
- Terminator: The Sarah Connor Chronicles: Cromartie tries to track down John Connor on the Pier, who steals a pair of sunglasses and a cap from a Pier vendor to disguise himself.
- NCIS: Los Angeles: The pilot begins with Agent G. Callen waking up in his small apartment overlooking the pier.
- 24: Jack tracks Fayed to the pier, and Dmitri Gredenko gets shot and dies under the pier.
- Gilmore Girls, when Jess goes to California to find his father. His father works at the pier.
- FlashForward, when Olivia and Charlie are out at the pier without Mark. In the final episode, it also appears briefly in the background in one shot.
- Castle, in Season 3 Episode 22, "To Love and Die in L.A.", when Beckett takes down Ganz.
- Chuck, when Chuck defuses a car bomb rigged by Laszlo underneath the pier (he first meets Laszlo while playing in one of the arcades on the pier).
- The fourth season of Hannah Montana Forever takes place in Santa Monica instead of the Malibu setting of previous seasons, and the pier is frequently shown as Lilly works at a game booth.
- The fourth season of Liv and Maddie takes place in California. At the intro's season, there's a shot of the Santa Monica Pier sign, as well as on the season in general.
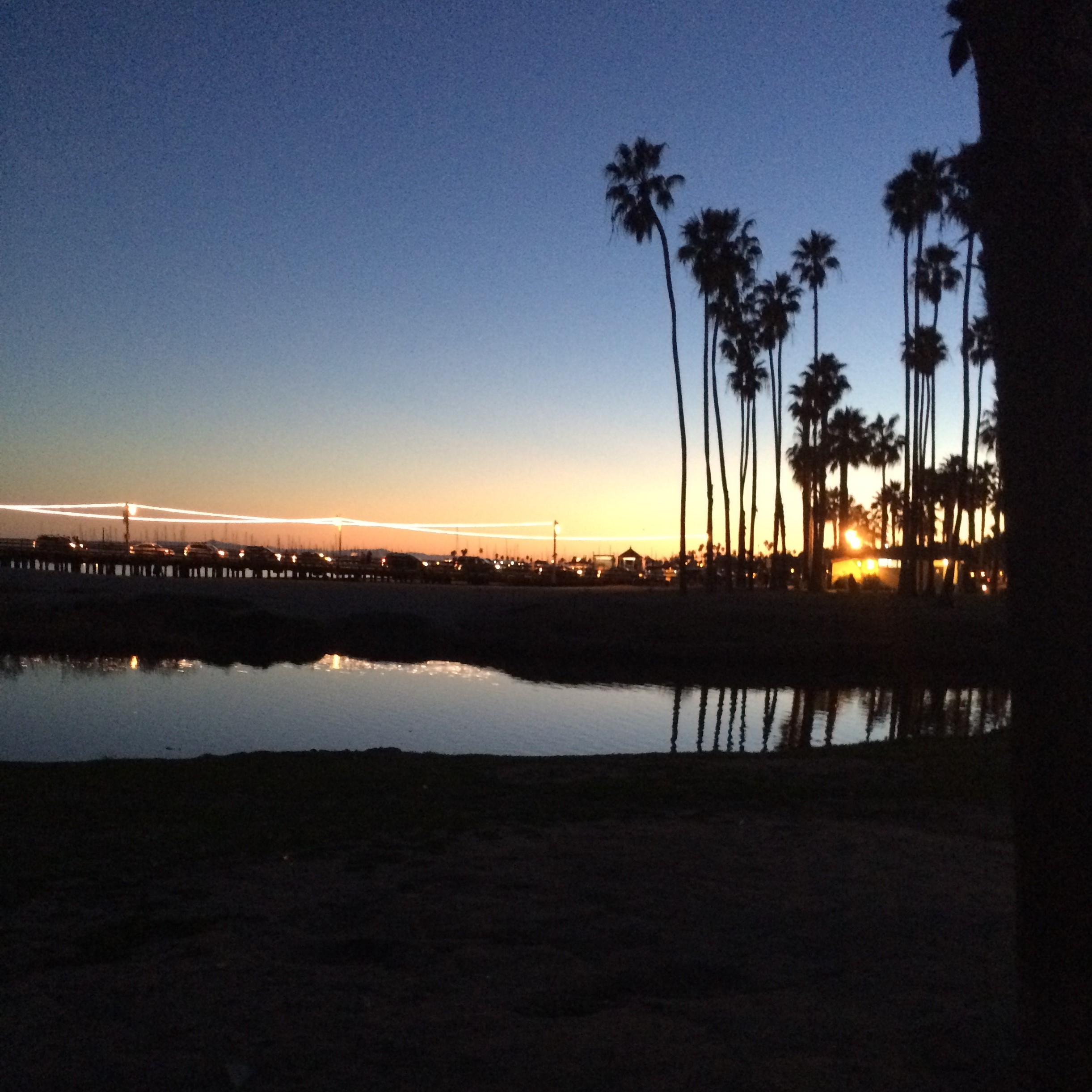
- A distant view of the Santa Monica Pier at sunset, 2014
  90210, where several scenes are shot at the pier throughout the series. The pier is frequently shown whenever the characters visit the pier or the Beverly Hills beach club.
- Welcome to the Family, in Season 1 Episode 1, Pilot
- Grey's Anatomy episodes "The Other Side of Life Pts. 1/2".
- Private Practice, where there has been several scenes shot at the pier throughout the series.
- Keeping Up with the Kardashians, where Kris and Khloé met with the BG5 girls.
- Monk, in the episode "Mr. Monk and the Birds and the Bees", in which detective Adrian Monk chases a criminal throughout the park, who tries to get rid of evidence that could prove him guilty. Eventually, he is arrested after being caught on the pier.
- Eva Luna, in the last episode
- America's Next Top Model, in Cycle 17: All-Stars for episode 5.
- Big Time Rush (Nickelodeon TV series).
- Criminal Minds, in Season 8 Episode 7, "The Fallen", in season 5, episode 12 "The Uncanny Valley" the Carousel was where the first body was found.
- The Mindy Project, where there were scenes shot only at the pier from episode 13, "LA".
- The Bold and the Beautiful episodes 2416 and 2417 (broadcast in November 1996): Maggie Forrester is held captive by Mike Guthrie in Pacific Park.
- Touch, in which there were several scenes shot at the pier throughout the series.
- Drop Dead Diva, in which there were several scenes shot at the pier throughout the series.
- Californication, in which there were several scenes shot at the pier throughout the series.
- The Lying Game, where there were several scenes shot at the pier throughout the series.
- Modern Family, where there were several scenes shot at the pier throughout the series.
- New Girl, where there were several scenes shot at the pier throughout the series.
- Hart of Dixie, in which there were scenes shot only at the pier from episode 16, "Carrying Your Love with Me".
- The Great Food Truck Race, in Season 6, Episode 1, "All-American Road Trip".
- Goliath: The series is shot in Santa Monica and throughout the series the pier and Pacific Park are prominently featured among other Santa Monica landmarks.
- Stitchers, in Season 1, Episode 3, "Connections", and Season 1, Episode 10, "Full Stop".
- Lucifer, in Season 2, Episode 18, "The Good, the Bad and the Crispy".
- 9-1-1, where there were several scenes shot at the pier throughout the series.
- She Spies, where there were several scenes shot at the pier throughout the series.
- Gossip Girl, where there were scenes shot only at the pier from episode 1, "Yes, Than Zero".
- Penny Dreadful: City of Angels, Season 1, Episode 3, "Wicked Old World"
- The New Normal, Season 1, Episode 22, "The Big Day"
- Pacific Blue, multiple scenes in multiple seasons.
- Fallout, Season 1, Episode 1, "The End"

=== Video games ===
- American Truck Simulator (updated in full detail in 2024 as part of the 1.53 Update)
- Cars: Race-O-Rama
- Rush
- Midnight Club: Los Angeles
- Tony Hawk's American Wasteland
- Vampire: The Masquerade – Bloodlines
- Grand Theft Auto: San Andreas (as the basis of a similar pier)
- Grand Theft Auto V (as the basis of a similar pier)
- LEGO City Undercover (in the district Paradise Sands)
- Mario Kart Tour and Mario Kart 8 Deluxe (as part of the racetrack "Los Angeles Laps")
- Dead Island 2 (the pier is in a mission and also is a part of the map that players can visit anytime)
- Counter-Strike 2 (recreated in "Dogtown", a community made map officially added May 8 2025)
- Horizon Forbidden West (the ruins of the pier can be visited in the Burning Shores DLC)
- Ready or Not (as the basis of a similar pier)

=== Music videos ===
- "I'll Never Get Over You Getting Over Me" by Expose (1993)
- "Bidi Bidi Bom Bom" by Selena (1994)
- "Tales From The Westside" by Proper Dos (1994)
- "Father of Mine" by Everclear (1998)
- "Jamboree" by Naughty by Nature (1999)
- "Clarity" by John Mayer (2003)
- "Almost Lover" by A Fine Frenzy (2007)
- "Bring Our Brothers Home" by MC Hammer (2007)
- "A Headfirst Slide Into Cooperstown On a Bad Bet: A Weekend At Pete Rose's" by Fall Out Boy (2008)
- "Maybe California" by Tori Amos (2009)
- "Let's Get Crazy" by Hannah Montana (2009)
- "Kings & Queens" by Thirty Seconds to Mars (2009)
- "'Til Summer Comes Around" by Keith Urban (2010)
- "Beggin' on Your Knees" by Victoria Justice ft. Victorious Cast (2011)
- "Never Gonna Leave This Bed" by Maroon 5 (2011)
- "Do You Love Me Like You Used To" by Best Coast (2012)
- "The One" by Tamar Braxton (2013)
- "Paper Hearts" by Tori Kelly
- "No Way Out" by Vicetone ft. Kat Nestel (2015)
- "4r Da Squaw" by Isaiah Rashad (2016)
- "I'm Looking for Love" by Landry M (2017)
- "All I See" by NateWantsToBattle (2017)

== Climate ==
Climate data for Santa Monica Pier, CA
Month	Jan	Feb	Mar	Apr	May	Jun	Jul	Aug	Sep	Oct	Nov	Dec	Year
Record high °F (°C)	85 (29)	89 (32)	90 (32)	91 (33)	89 (32)	92 (33)	91 (33)	95 (35)	94 (34)	99 (37)	100 (38)	89 (32)	100 (38)
Mean maximum °F (°C)	76.9 (24.9)	76.1 (24.5)	74.5 (23.6)	75.6 (24.2)	73.0 (22.8)	74.8 (23.8)	77.5 (25.3)	77.5 (25.3)	81.7 (27.6)	83.3 (28.5)	80.8 (27.1)	76.6 (24.8)	89.4 (31.9)
Mean daily maximum °F (°C)	64.1 (17.8)	63.7 (17.6)	63.4 (17.4)	64.5 (18.1)	65.4 (18.6)	68.1 (20.1)	71.0 (21.7)	72.1 (22.3)	72.1 (22.3)	70.4 (21.3)	68.0 (20.0)	64.8 (18.2)	67.3 (19.6)
Mean daily minimum °F (°C)	49.2 (9.6)	49.9 (9.9)	50.8 (10.4)	55.6 (13.1)	55.6 (13.1)	58.4 (14.7)	61.2 (16.2)	62.2 (16.8)	61.4 (16.3)	58.2 (14.6)	53.6 (12.0)	49.7 (9.8)	55.5 (13.0)
Mean minimum °F (°C)	41.8 (5.4)	43.3 (6.3)	44.2 (6.8)	46.3 (7.9)	50.3 (10.2)	53.8 (12.1)	57.0 (13.9)	57.7 (14.3)	56.1 (13.4)	51.9 (11.1)	45.9 (7.7)	42.3 (5.7)	40.4 (4.7)
Record low °F (°C)	34 (1)	35 (2)	33 (1)	39 (4)	43 (6)	45 (7)	49 (9)	51 (11)	44 (7)	42 (6)	37 (3)	34 (1)	33 (1)
Average precipitation inches (mm)	2.69 (68)	3.01 (76)	2.03 (52)	0.73 (19)	0.17 (4.3)	0.03 (0.76)	0.02 (0.51)	0.08 (2.0)	0.15 (3.8)	0.33 (8.4)	1.36 (35)	2.04 (52)	12.64 (321.77)
Source: https://wrcc.dri.edu/cgi-bin/cliMAIN.pl?ca7953

== Photo gallery ==
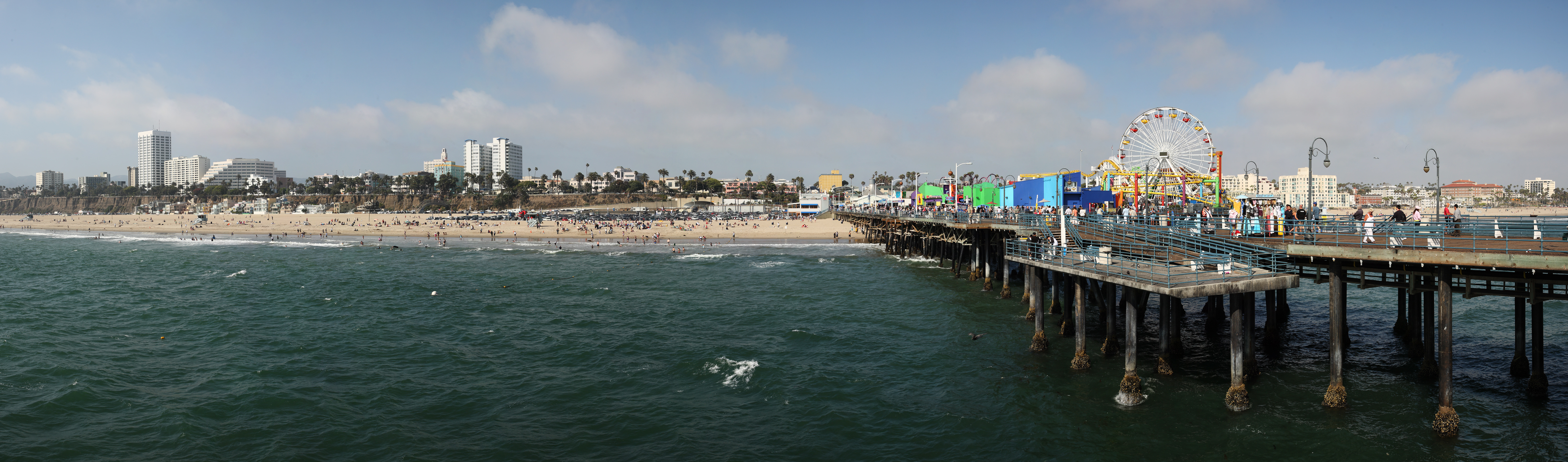
A panorama of Santa Monica beach and pier viewed from the end of the Pier, 2009
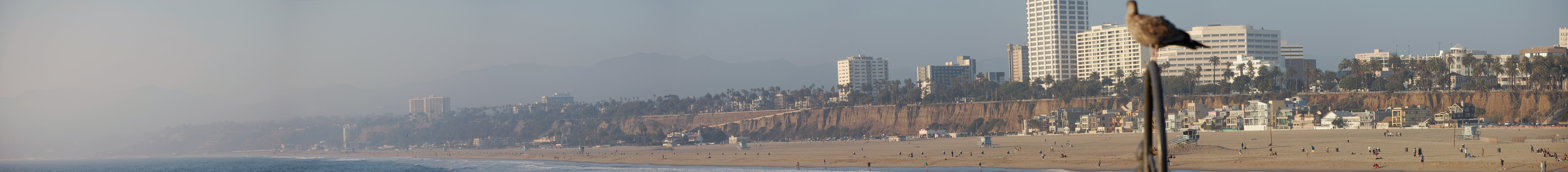
Santa Monica, 2010
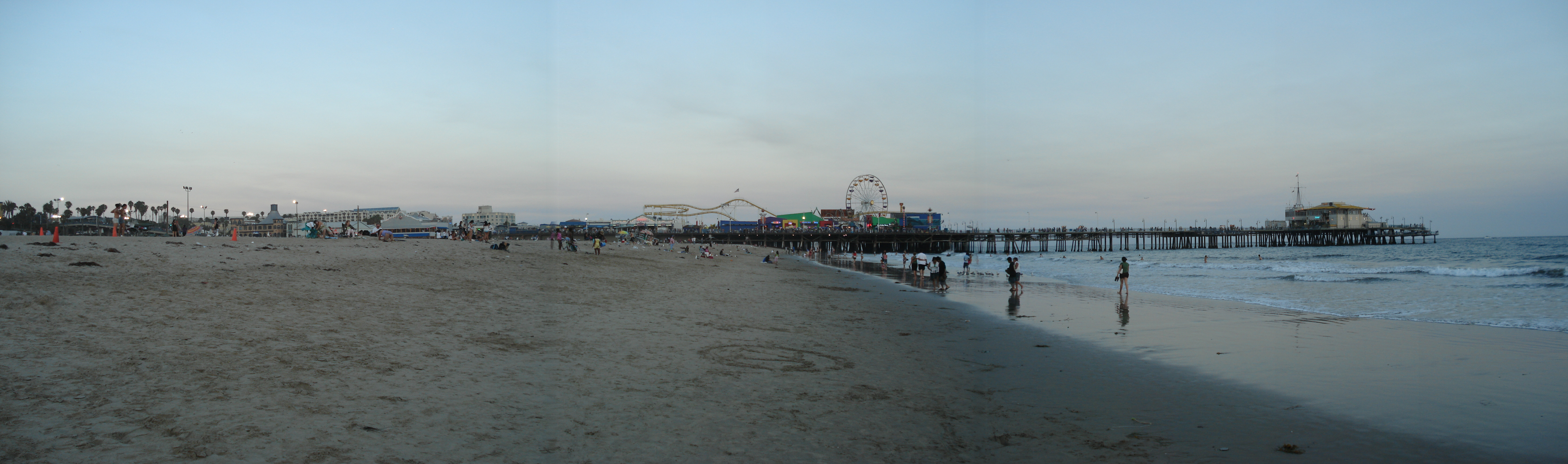
Looking south toward the Santa Monica Pier at dusk, 2007
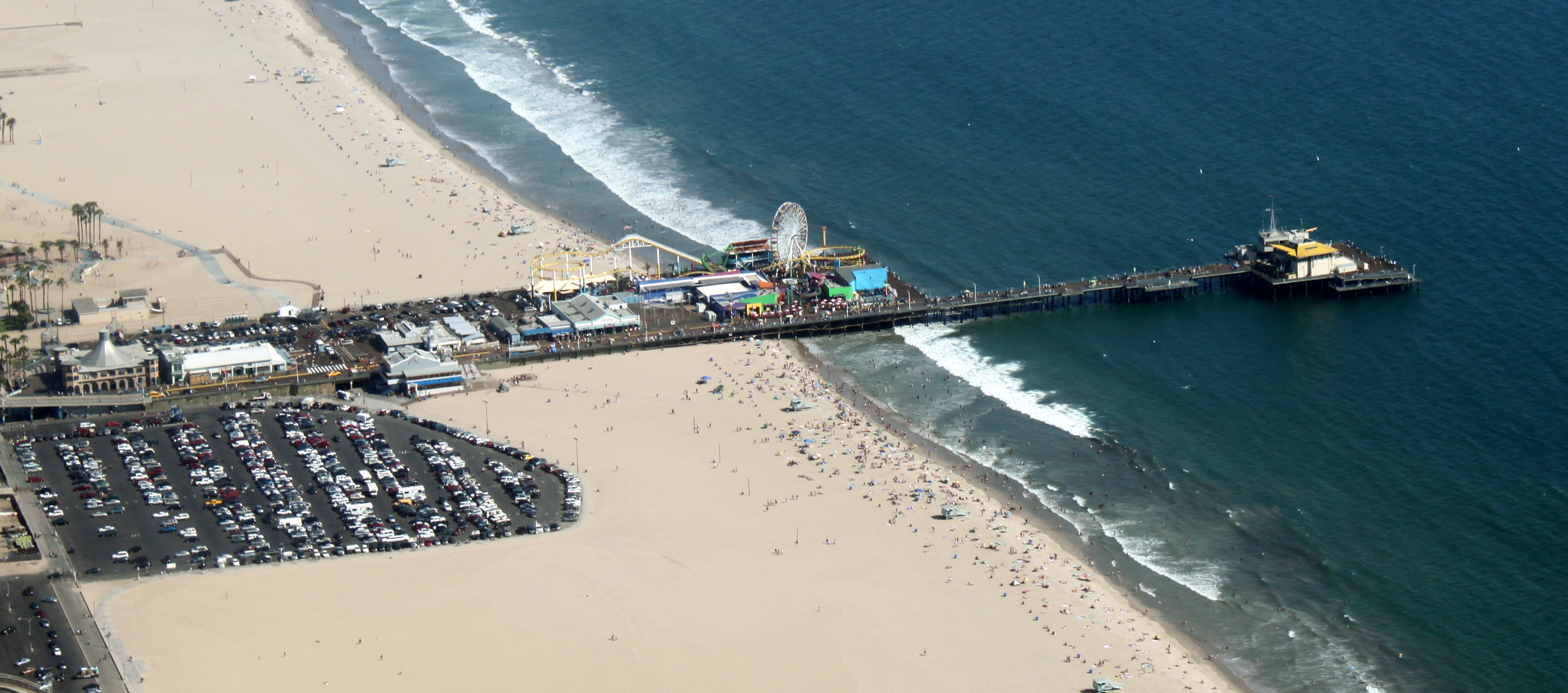
Aerial view of the pier and its environs, 2009
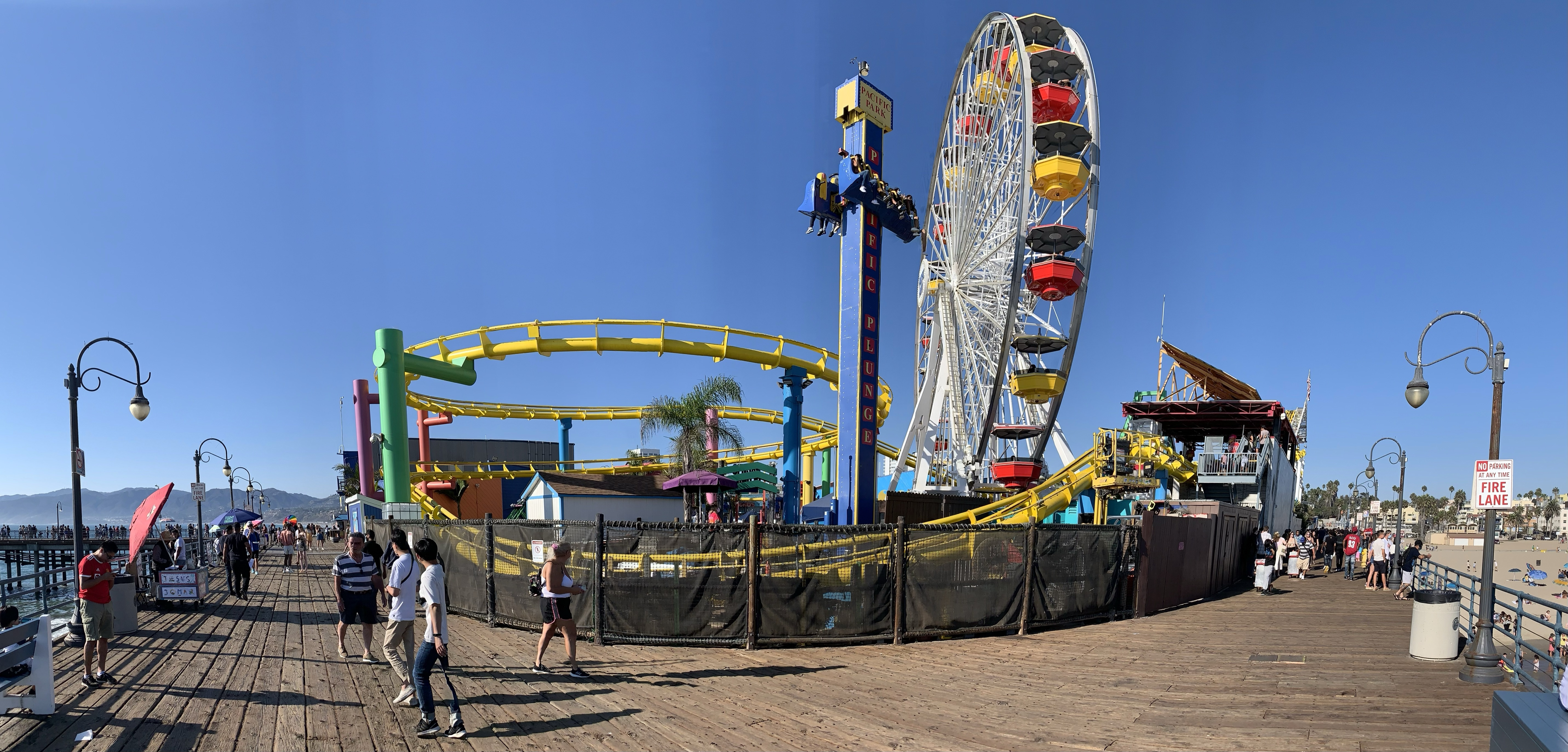
Pacific Park on the pier, 2021
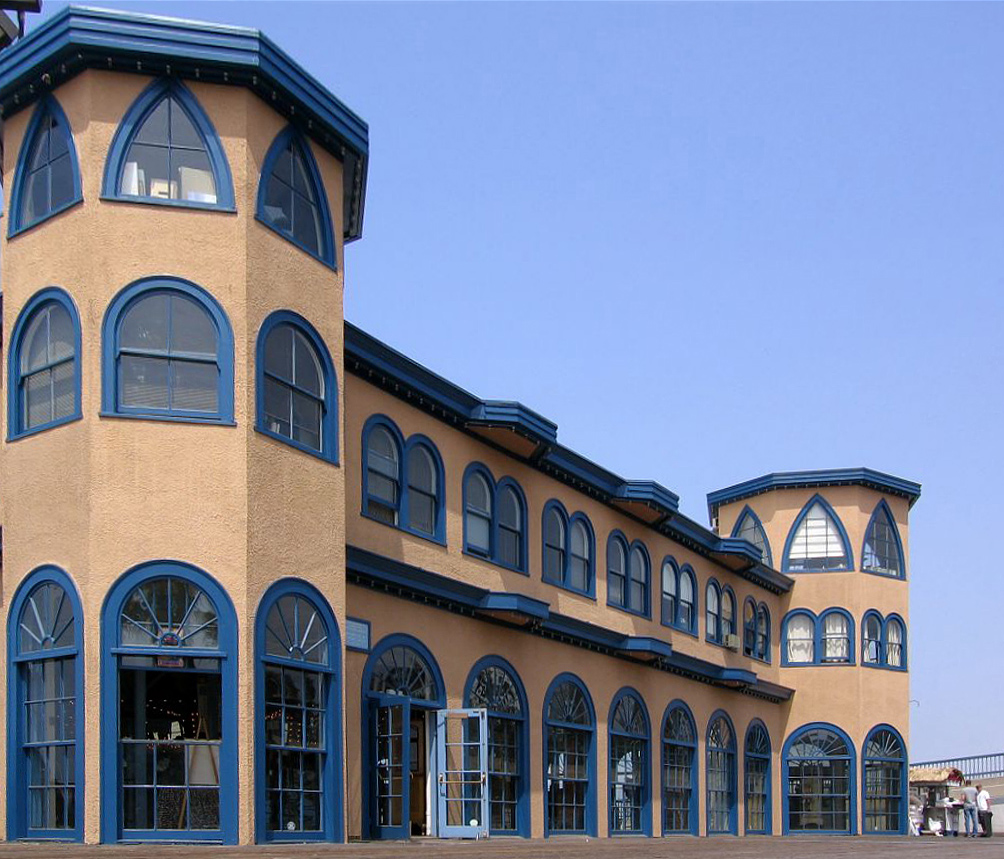
Looff Hippodrome on the pier

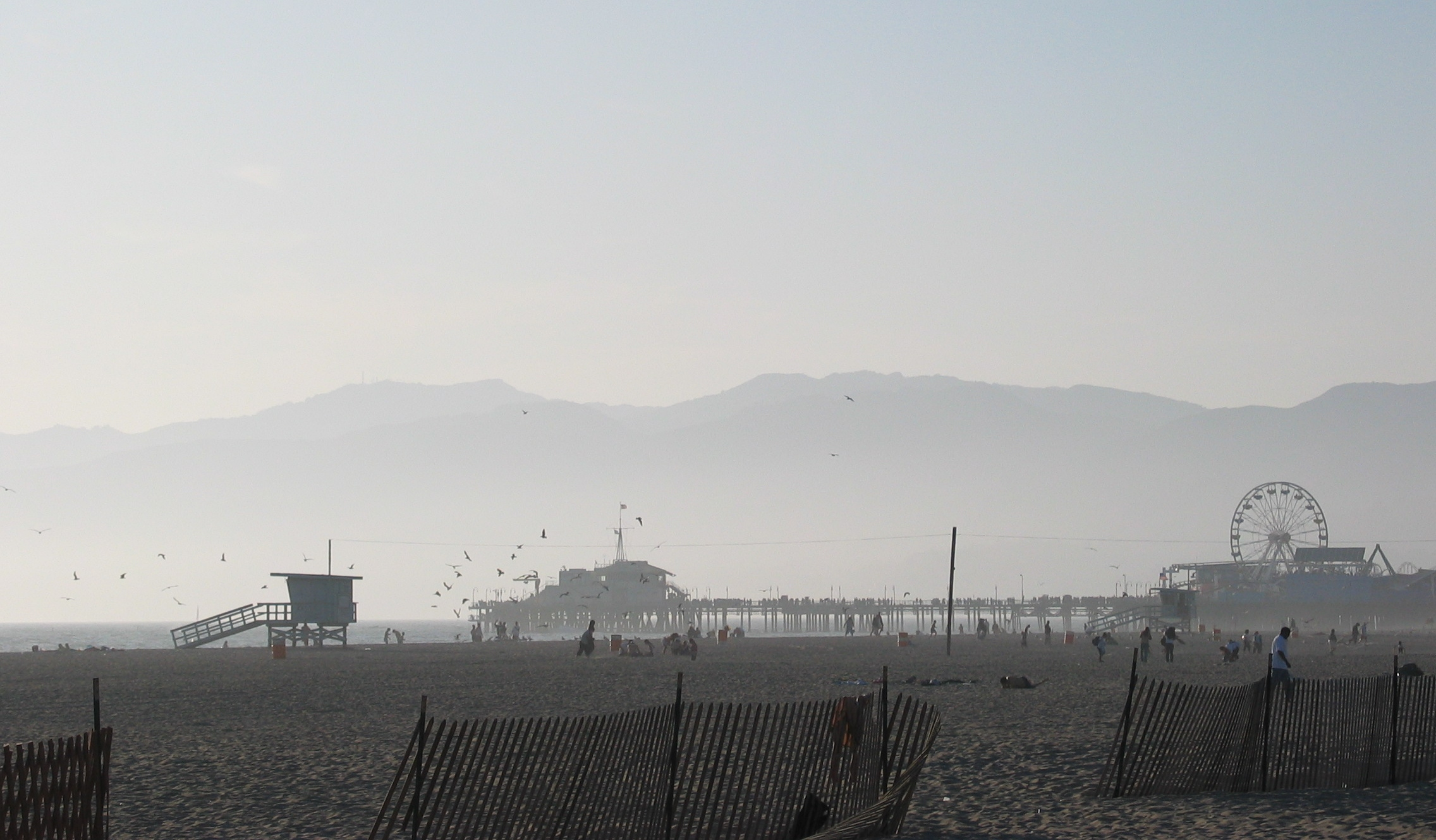
Santa Monica beach and pier from Venice, 2004

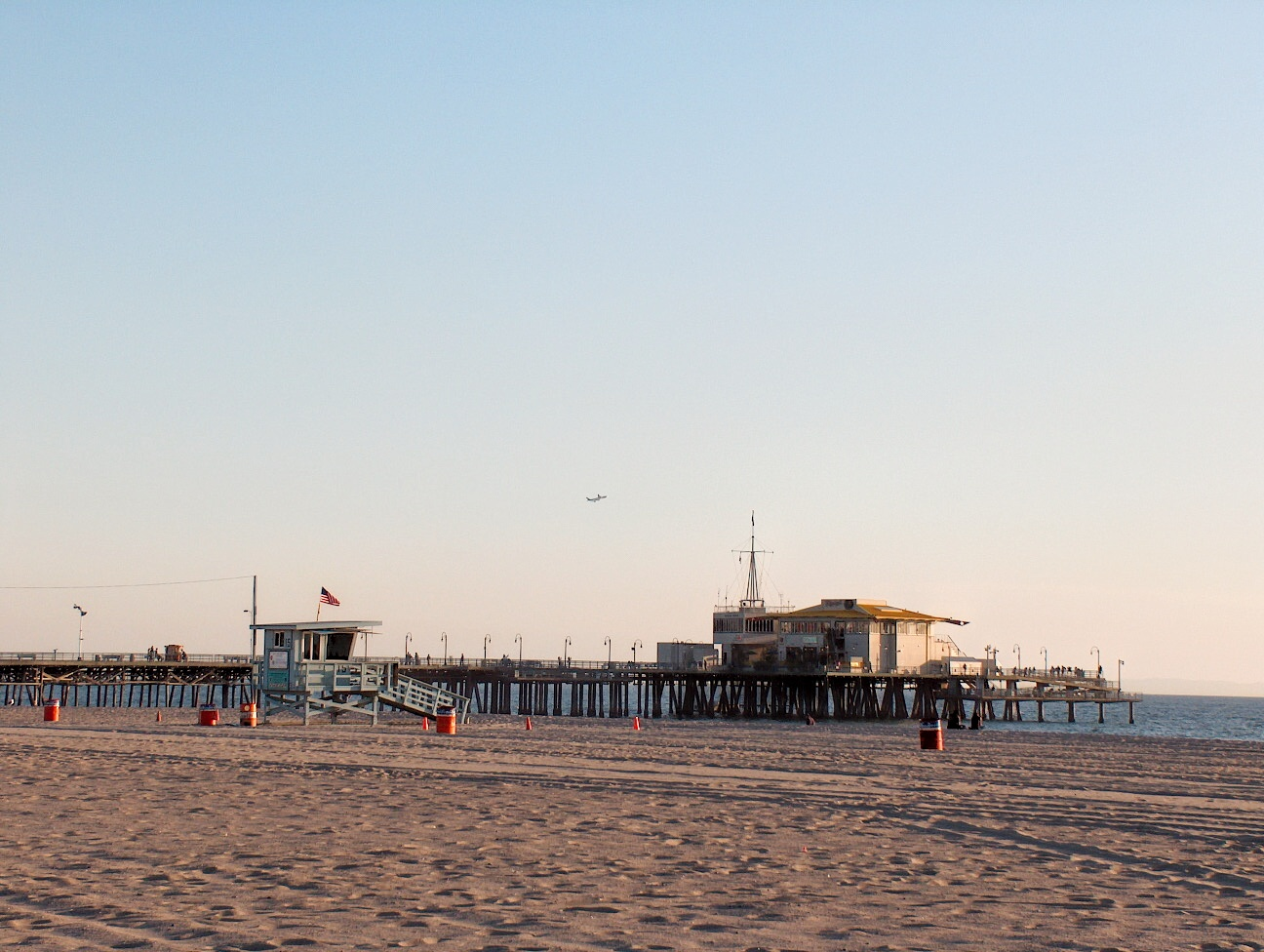
Santa Monica Pier, 2006

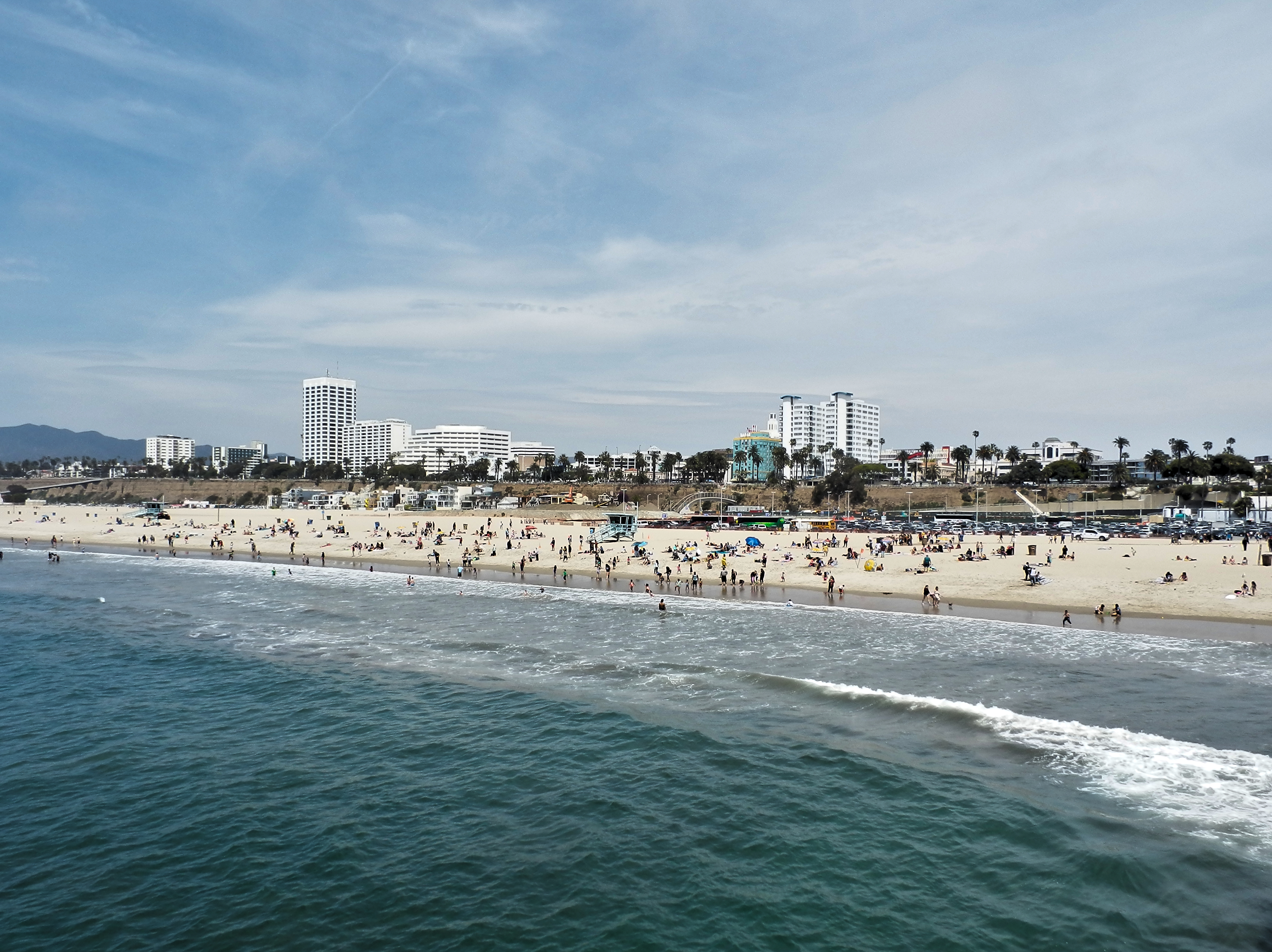
View of Santa Monica from the pier

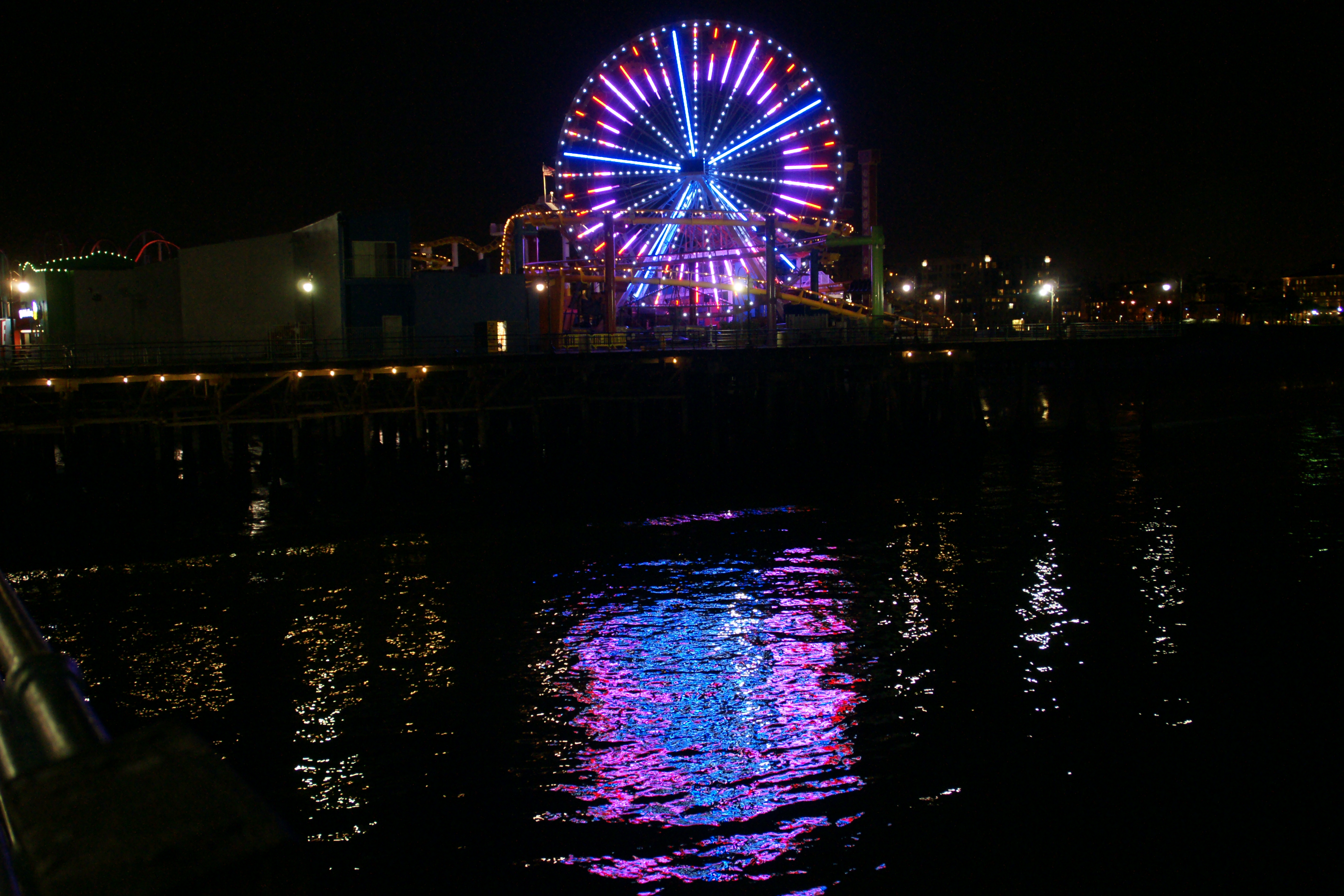
Ferris wheel light show at night, 2009

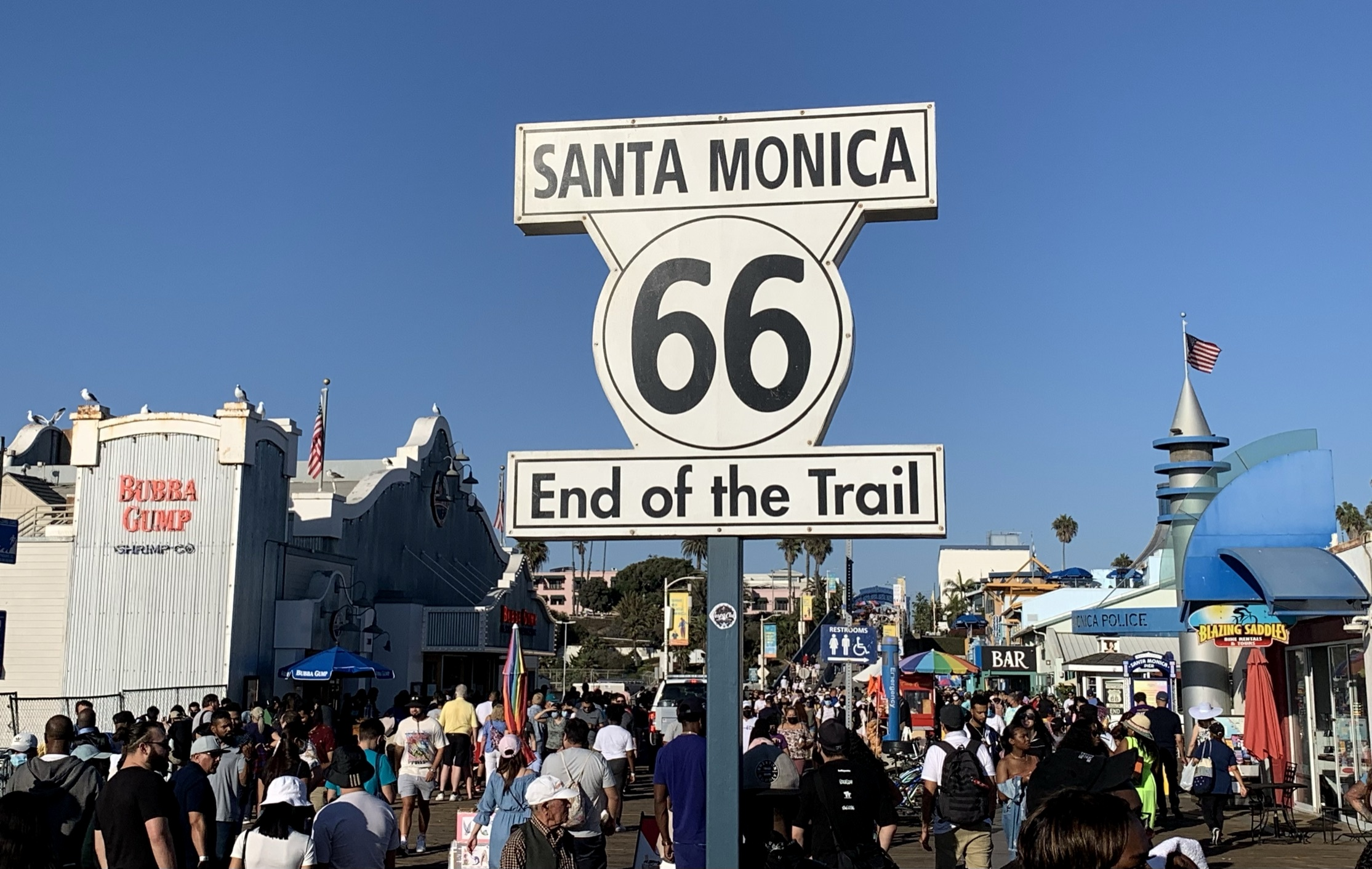
U.S. Route 66 sign on the pier

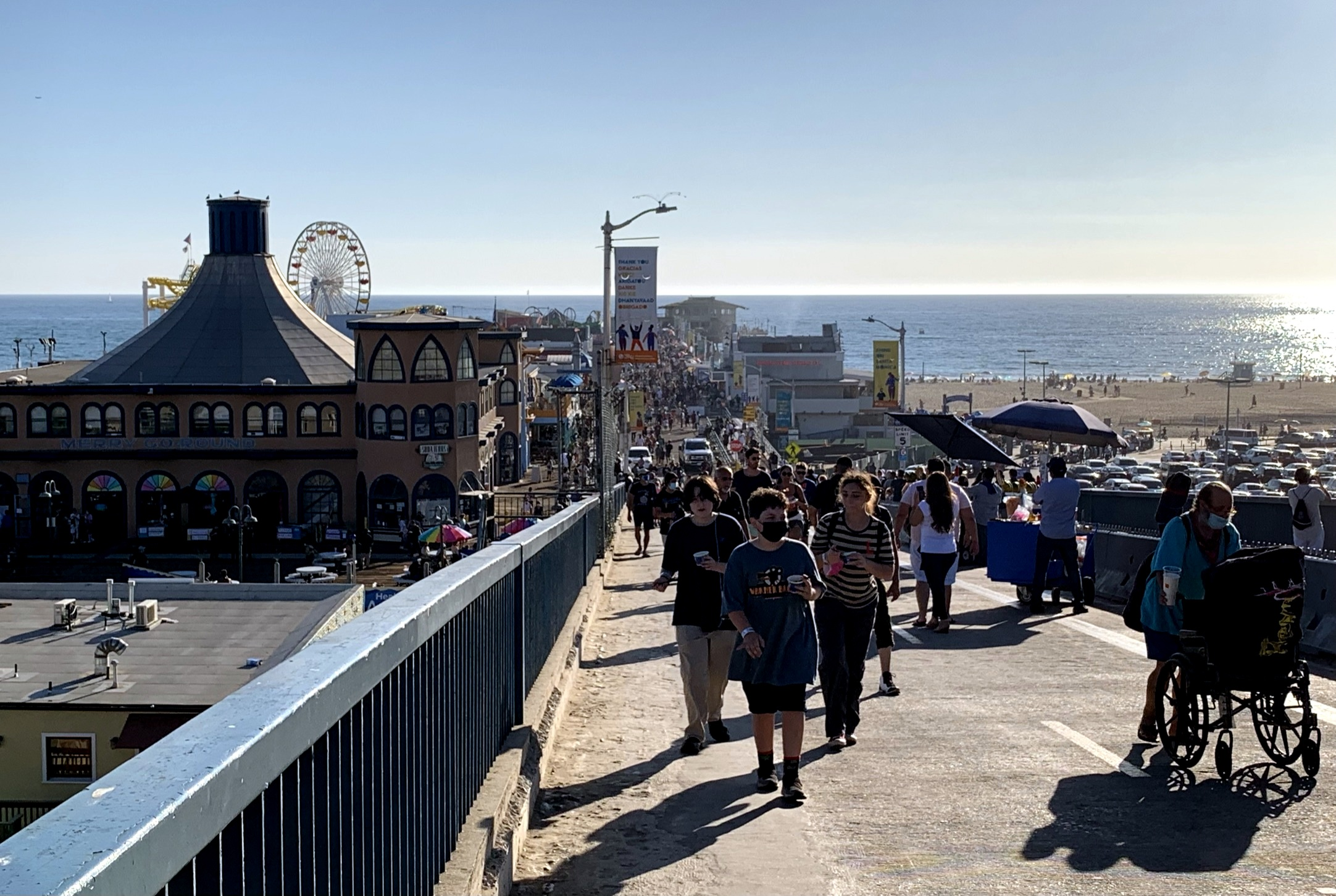
View of the pier in 2021

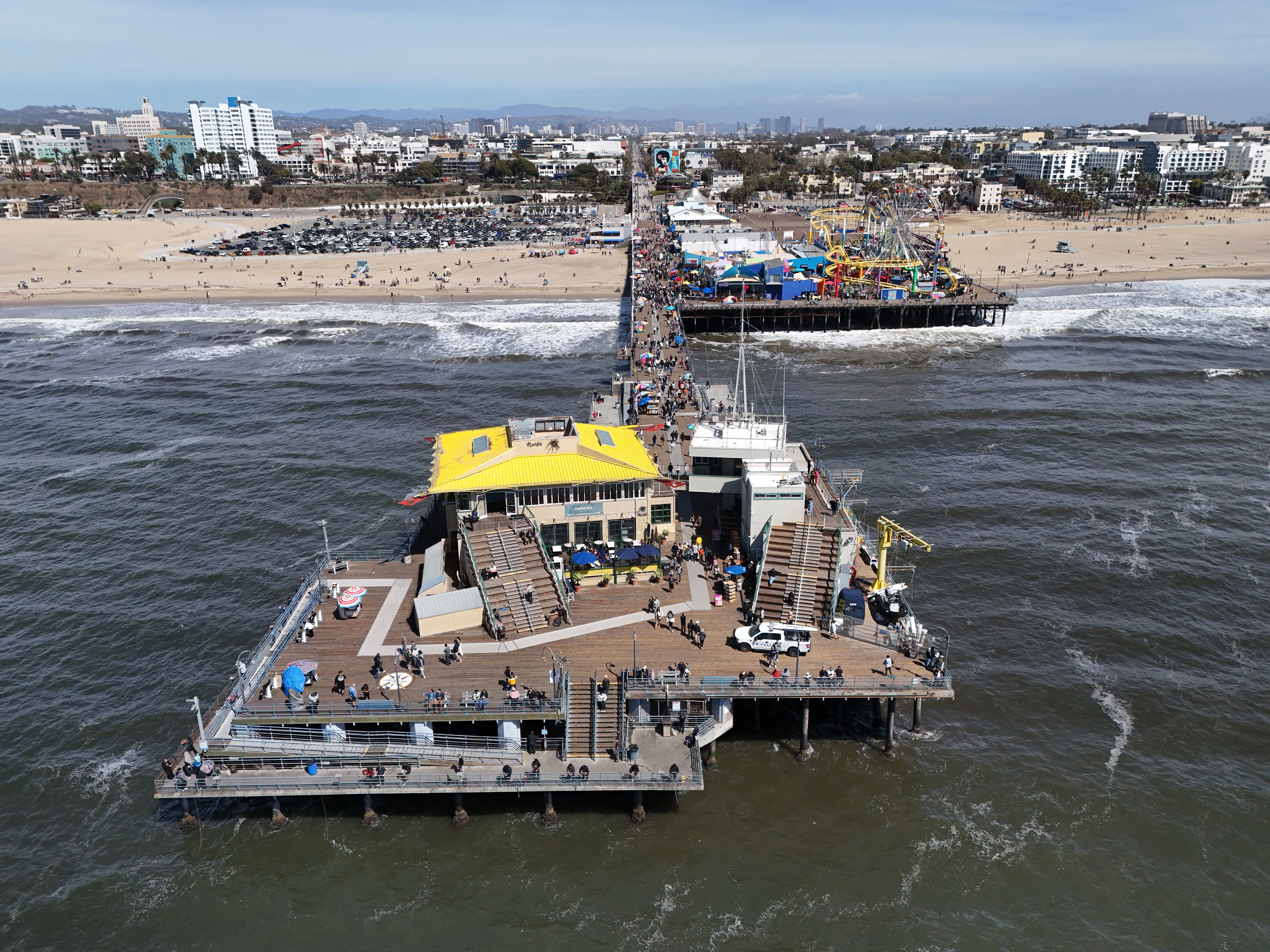
Aerial photo from 2025

== See also ==
- Santa Monica Pier Aquarium—aquarium on the pier operated by Heal the Bay, and formerly known as the Ocean Discovery Center.
- Pacific Park—the current amusement park portion of the pier.
- Hot Dog on a Stick—original, opened in 1946, found on the sidewalk just south of the pier in front of Muscle Beach.
- Pacific Ocean Park—former (1958–1967) amusement park one pier south of Santa Monica Pier; demolished in 1974.
- The Pike—former (1905–1979) amusement zone along the shoreline of Long Beach, CA, demolished in 1979.
- Santa Monica State Beach—California State Park operated by the City of Santa Monica. 2 mi (3.2 km) of beach adjacent to the pier.
- Santa Monica bicycle path—path that runs through a bicycle-only underpass under the pier.
- Muscle Beach—originally located just south of the pier.
- Long Wharf—an extensive pier wharf constructed in Santa Monica Bay from 1892 to 1894.
- Downtown Santa Monica station, the E Line's western terminal station location two blocks east from the beach and Santa Monica Pier on Colorado street.
- Third Street Promenade, a downtown pedestrian mall, in Santa Monica, California, built in 1965, whose original name was Santa Monica Mall
- Santa Monica Place an outdoor shopping mall in Santa Monica, California, adjacent to Third Street Promenade, two blocks east from the beach and Santa Monica Pier
