= Santa Monica Looff Hippodrome =

- U.S. National Register of Historic Places
- U.S. National Historic Landmark
- Santa Monica Historic Landmark
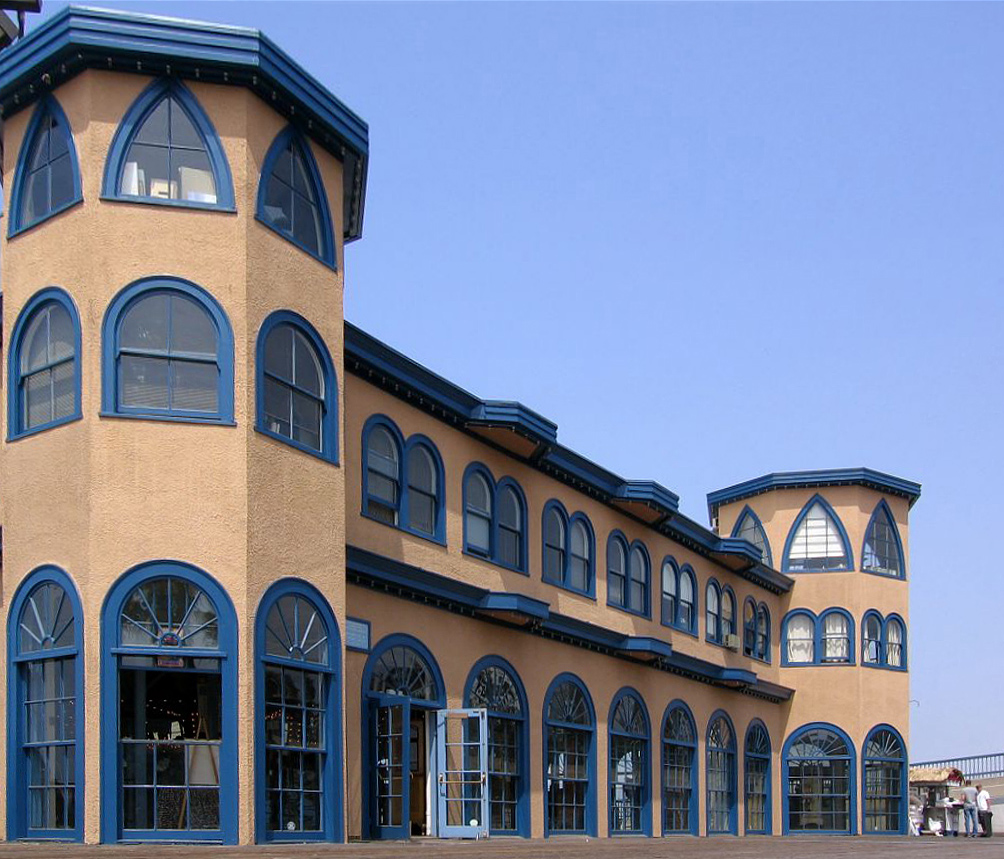

- Location within the Los Angeles metropolitan area Location within California Location within the United States
- Location: 276 Santa Monica Pier, Santa Monica, California
- Coordinates: 34°0′36.36″N 118°29′43.45″W
- Area: less than one acre
- Built: 1916
- Architect: Looff, Charles & Arthur
- Architectural style: Mixture of Byzantine, Moorish, and Californian
- NRHP reference No.: 87000766
- SMHL No.: 3

Significant dates
- Added to NRHP: February 27, 1987
- Designated NHL: February 27, 1987
- Designated SMHL: August 17, 1976

The Santa Monica Looff Hippodrome is located on the Newcomb Pier adjacent to the Santa Monica Pier in Santa Monica, California. It was designed and built in 1916 by Charles I. D. Looff and his son Arthur to hold a Looff Carousel. Looff's carousel was housed at the Hippodrome until it was sold in 1939. It was replaced by Philadelphia Toboggan Company Carousel #62, which was moved from the Ocean Park Pier. The building remains a rare example of structures that used to be on the amusement pier, and scenes were filmed therein for the 1973 film, The Sting. Since 1977, the carousel has been owned by the city, and was restored from 1977 through 1981. It was declared a National Historic Landmark in 1987.

== History ==
=== Looff years (1910s–1930s) ===
On June 12, 1916, the Looff Hippodrome opened. It and its carousel were part of Looff's new amusement park "Pleasure Pier," on a short, wide pier adjacent to the long, narrow Santa Monica Pier.

=== Newcomb years (1940s–1960s) ===
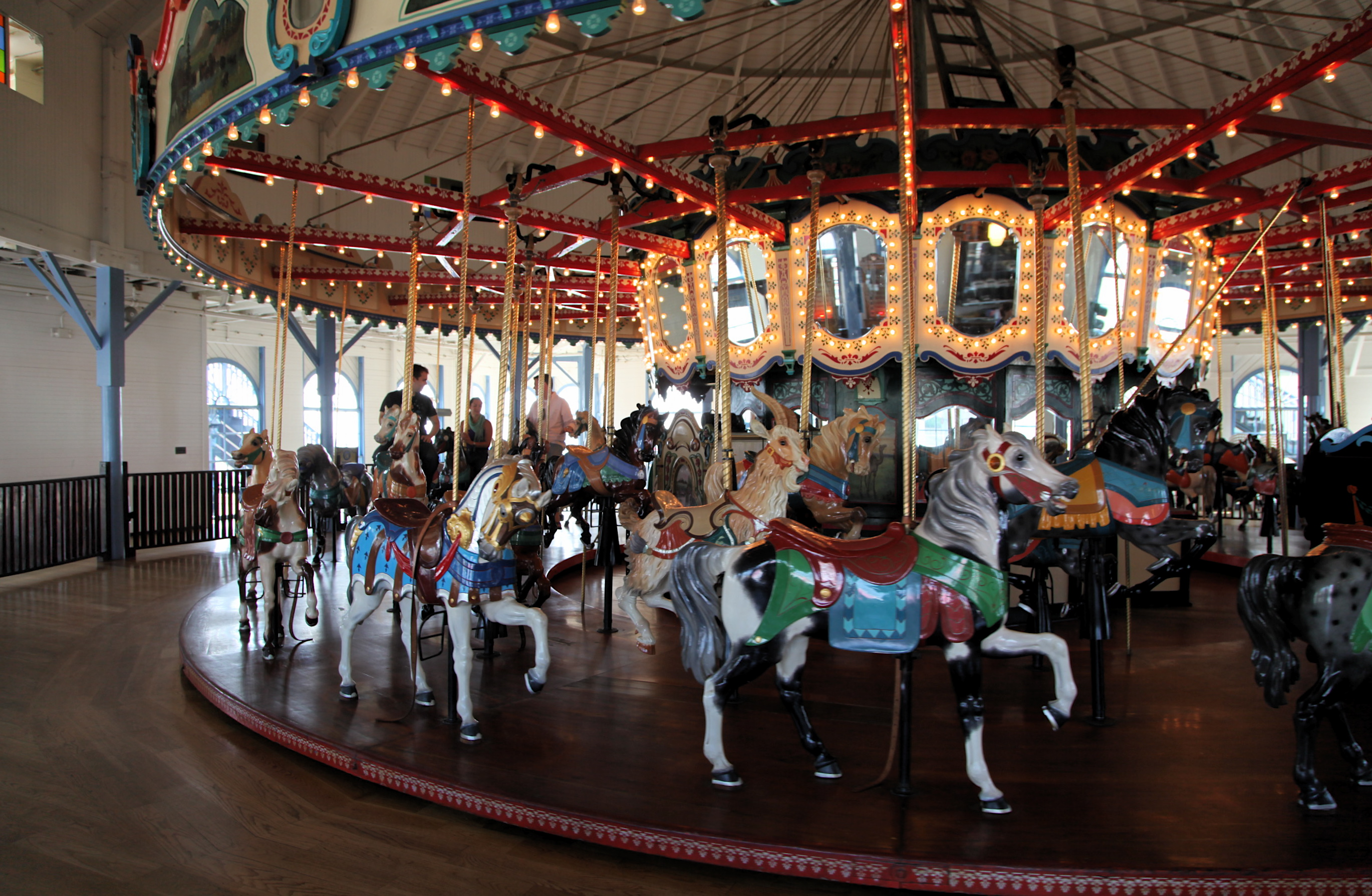
Carousel built in 1922 and installed in the hippodrome in 1947

When World War II ended, Walter Newcomb found himself in an enviable position. The amusement business was expected to see a great surge with the return of the country's military personnel and a general feeling of national pride. With the closure of the Venice Pier reducing his competition, he relocated his Venice-based carousel into the old Looff Hippodrome.

=== Threats, storms, and restoration (1970s–1990s) ===
Over the next several decades the city of Santa Monica proposed various plans to tear down Newcomb Pier, and with it the Hippodrome. The city council approved a plan to replace the pier with a resort island in Santa Monica Bay. Local activists formed Save Santa Monica Bay and shot down that plan, and in 1973 the city formally revoked a standing order to demolish the pier. The city acquired ownership of the pier in summer 1974. In the 1980s it was almost destroyed by winter storms.

In 1983 the city formed a Pier Restoration and Development Task Force (now the Pier Restoration Corporation), tasked with returning the pier to its former glory. In 1989 the Pier Restoration Corporation decided to "make the pier a year-round commercial development with amusement rides, gift shops, nightclubs with live entertainment and restaurants" that would be "reminiscent of its heyday in the 1920s and 1930s". The Hippodrome was restored and the Carousel was rebuilt inside it. The current 2-acre (0.81 ha) Pacific Park opened in 1996 as a full-scale family amusement park.
