= Dorothy Green (environmentalist) =

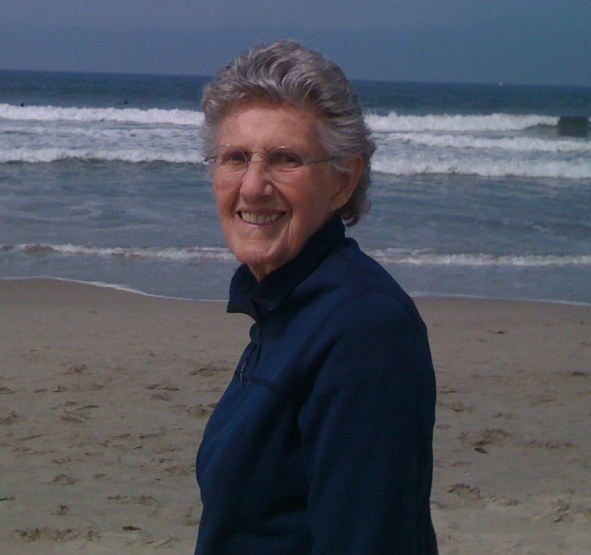
- Born: March 16, 1929
- Died: October 13, 2008 (aged 79)
- Education: University of California, Berkeley
- Known for: Environmental Activism

Dorothy Green (March 16, 1929 – October 13, 2008) was an environmental activist and grassroots organizer. She was the founding president of the environmental group, Heal the Bay. Green was considered a mentor to officials and leaders active in California water issues and she founded several organizations that have effectively shaped policy on a variety of environmental issues.

== Early life ==
Dorothy Green was born in on March 16, 1929, in Detroit, Michigan, the daughter of Polish immigrants. She came to Los Angeles and enrolled at UCLA as a music major, playing cello in the school orchestra. She graduated in 1951 from University of California at Berkeley, according to an obituary article in the Los Angeles Times, and in that same year, she married Jacob Green. They had three children together: Joshua, Avrom, and Herschel. Her husband was at her side until his death in 2005.

== Career ==
Dorothy Green began her career as a water quality advocate in 1972 when she worked on a campaign to pass Proposition 20, the ballot initiative that established the California Coastal Commission. In the 1980s, she joined the fight against the peripheral canal, was coordinator of Working Alliance to Equalize Rates, and president of the Los Angeles chapter of the League of Conservation Voters.

Her brother's discovery of untreated wastewater spilling into Santa Monica Bay spurred her to bring concerned citizens together in her Westwood home, an effort that would eventually lead to the founding of the group, Heal the Bay. Under her leadership the group held beach rallies to gain new members and generate publicity. They offered testimony at public hearings and successfully applied public pressure that helped to eventually bring an agreement to stop dumping sewage sludge into the bay and to upgrade the Hyperion sewage treatment facility.

Green said the group chose the name because it communicated hope, and her approach of encouraging collaboration among those with contrasting perspectives was the hallmark of her personal style. A former board member commented “Heal the Bay is such a positive organization and Dorothy set the tone of all of us. I was in a lot of meetings with Dorothy, and it wasn't about stopping things, but always about starting things.”

Green headed Heal the Bay for seven years before turning it over to Mark Gold. She then worked to help establish the Los Angeles and San Gabriel Rivers Watershed Council where she remained its President Emeritus for the rest of her life. She also served a term as a commissioner on the Los Angeles Department of Water and Power (LADWP), and was a board member and founding secretary of the California Water Impact Network (C-WIN). She chaired the Public Officials for Water and Environmental Reform (POWER) Conference.

Green was considered a mentor to current officials and leaders active in California water issues including Tim Brick, former chairman of the board of Metropolitan Water District of Southern California. Writing in her LA Times obituary he said, "She was quite unique in our generation. She not only was personally a very effective advocate, but she founded a series of organizations that have been very effective in shaping policy on a variety of different issues."

== Death ==
Green was diagnosed with melanoma decades before her death, but in 2003, the cancer returned and spread. She remained committed to her causes up until her death, even writing a commentary for the Los Angeles Times which ran just weeks before her death, pleading for a sensible water policy. She died on October 13, 2008, at the age of 79.

Carolee Krieger, President and executive director of the California Water Impact Network praised Green saying, "She was always willing to tell it like it is. Something I remember her saying something that I thought at the time was very important (and I have remembered it many times since) is this: 'Figure out your plan of action. Tell everyone about it, including the other side. And then do it.'"

In the Los Angeles Times obituary, Mark Gold, now a former executive director at Heal the Bay, recalled that when the group, Heal the Bay started, there was a "dead zone" in the middle of Santa Monica Bay, there were fish with tumors and 10 million gallon sewage spills. "None of that occurs anymore," he said. "That's Dorothy's legacy, every time you look out at the bay."

== Publications ==
Managing Water: Avoiding Conflict in California, published by the U.C. Press in 2007. ISBN 978-0-520-25327-8

== Awards ==
The President's Award for Volunteer Service presented by the head of US EPA Steve Johnson, February 2007.

Green was also honored in Vanity Fair's May 2007 "Green" issue as one of the Golden State's Eco-Warriors.

PCL Carla Bard Award for Volunteer Service at the PCL Annual Symposium, April, 2007.
