= Heal the Bay =

US non-profit organization

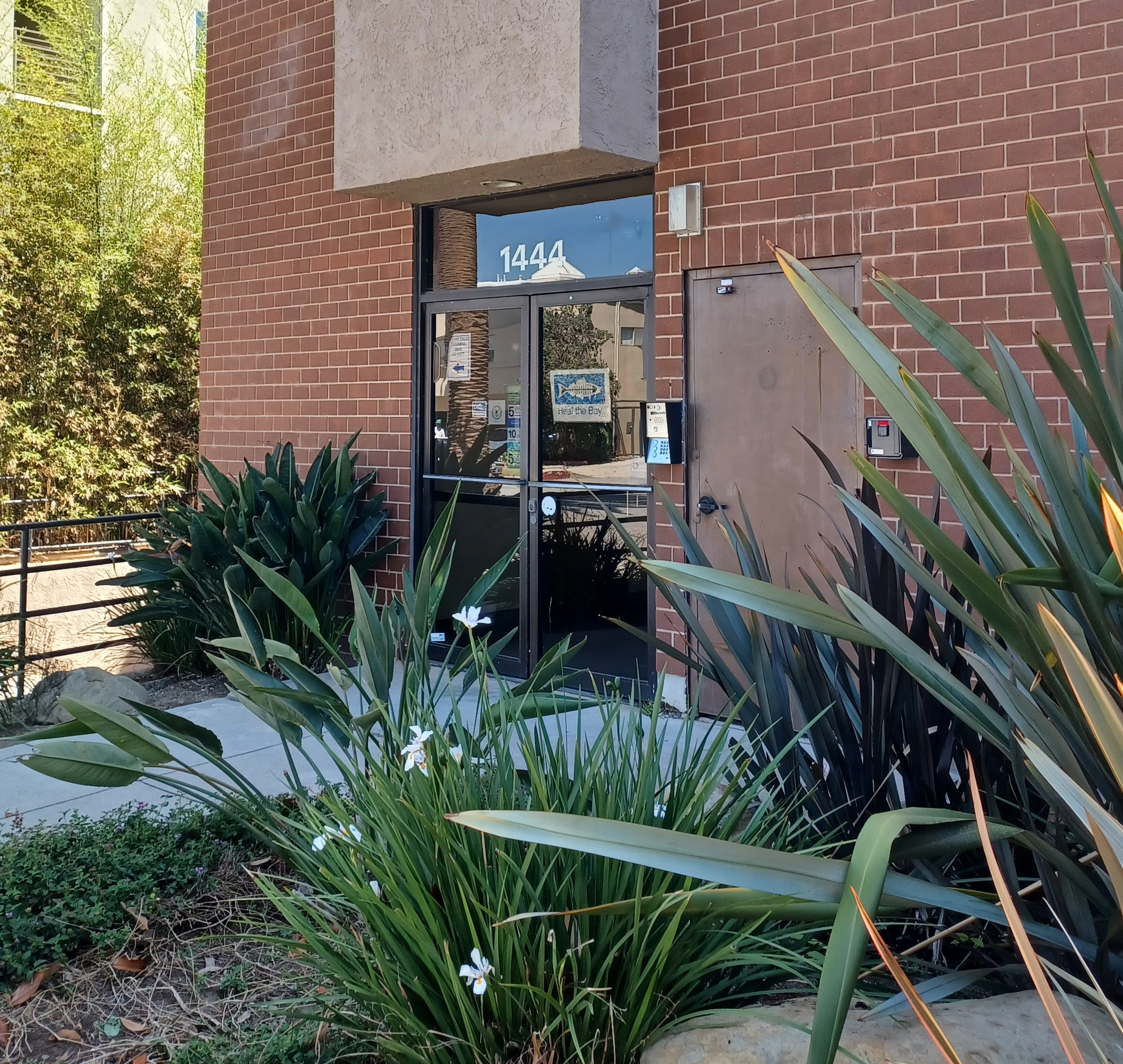
- Office in Santa Monica
- Founded: 1985
- Type: 501(c)(3)
- Purpose: Protecting the southern California coastline and the surrounding watersheds.
- Location: Santa Monica, California, U.S.
- Method: environmental advocacy, Research and Education
- Website: healthebay.org

Heal the Bay is a U.S. environmental advocacy group of activists based in Santa Monica, California. The focus is protecting coastal waters and watersheds of southern California, and is focused on Santa Monica Bay.

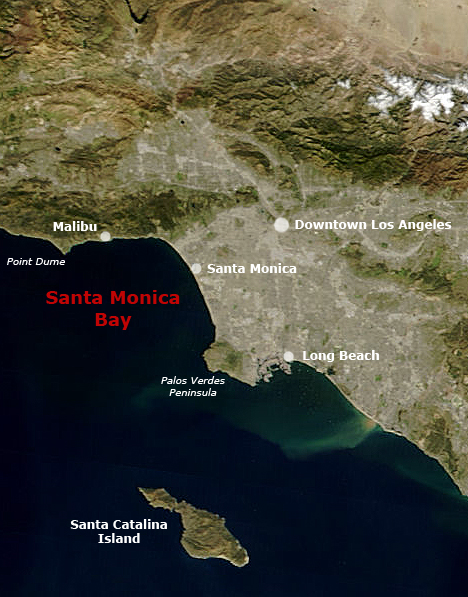
Map of Santa Monica Bay

Heal the Bay is a 501(c)(3) non-profit organization with full-time paid staff members and volunteers.

== History ==
Heal the Bay was founded in 1985 by a group of citizens led by environmental activist Dorothy Green. Mark Gold became the president of the organization in 2006 and held the position until 2012. The current president and CEO is Shelley Luce, who took the post in April 2017. The organization has become a prominent advocate for the environment in California, and is particularly known for its annual report card ratings of the water quality at beaches along the Pacific coast. It was also active in advocating for restrictions on plastic bags in California.

== Work ==
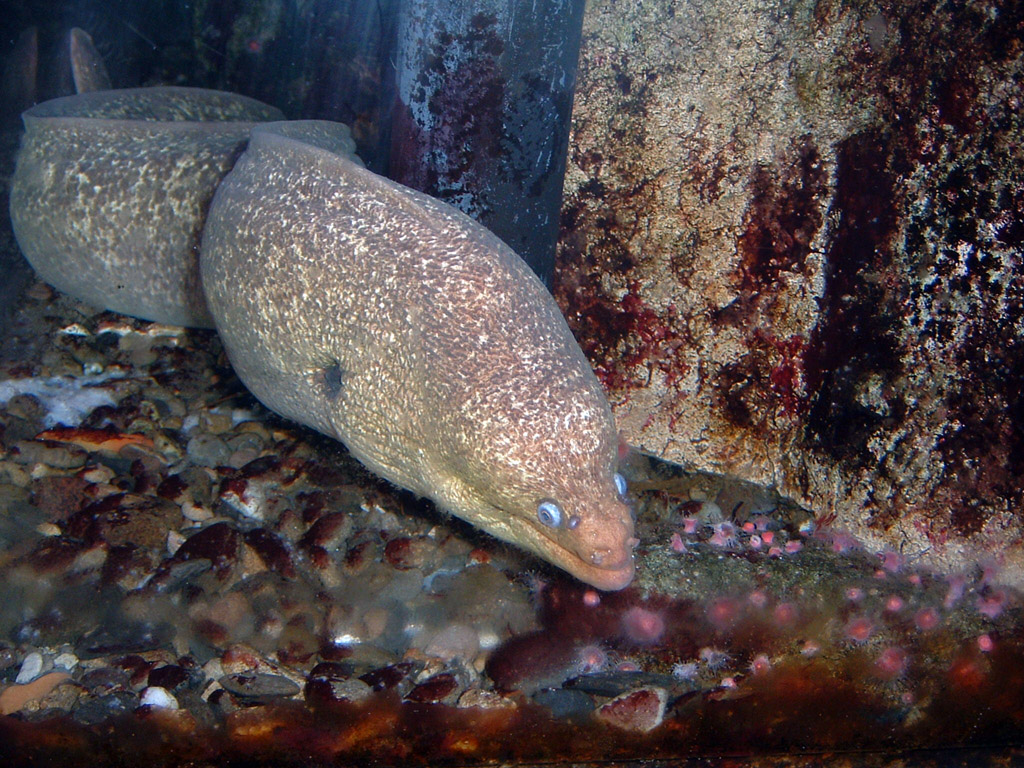
A moray eel at the aquarium

Heal the Bay supports public health and education outreach programs as well as sponsoring beach cleanup programs such as Coastal Cleanup Day, Adopt-a-Beach and Suits on the Sand in Los Angeles County, California. It operates Heal the Bay Aquarium, which was previously named the Santa Monica Pier Aquarium and formerly known as the Ocean Discovery Center and was operated by UCLA until 2003.

In 2003, then-California Assemblywoman Fran Pavley authored legislation that required the state to develop an environment-based curriculum to be offered to all California public schools. The bill (AB 1548 of 2003) was sponsored by Heal the Bay and was signed into law by then-Governor Gray Davis. The program it set in motion came to be known as the Education and the Environment Initiative.

Heal the Bay publishes an annual Beach Report Card, which grades the water quality at popular beaches up and down the West Coast of the United States. It also produces weekly and daily beach water quality grades online at beachreporter.ort and river quality grades at the River Report Card on the Heal the Bay website.

Recent accomplishments include leading grassroots movements to pass plastic reduction policies like Straws on Request and California Proposition 67. Heal the Bay also launched an advocacy campaign to pass Measure W and fund the Safe, Clean Water Program.

In August 2020, news outlets reported single-use PPE items (gloves, surgical masks, etc.) in the Santa Monica Bay shoreline and parking lots. Heal the Bay members were not able to gather in large groups due to the COVID-19 pandemic, but the policy has since been repealed.

== See also ==
- Hyperion sewage treatment plant
