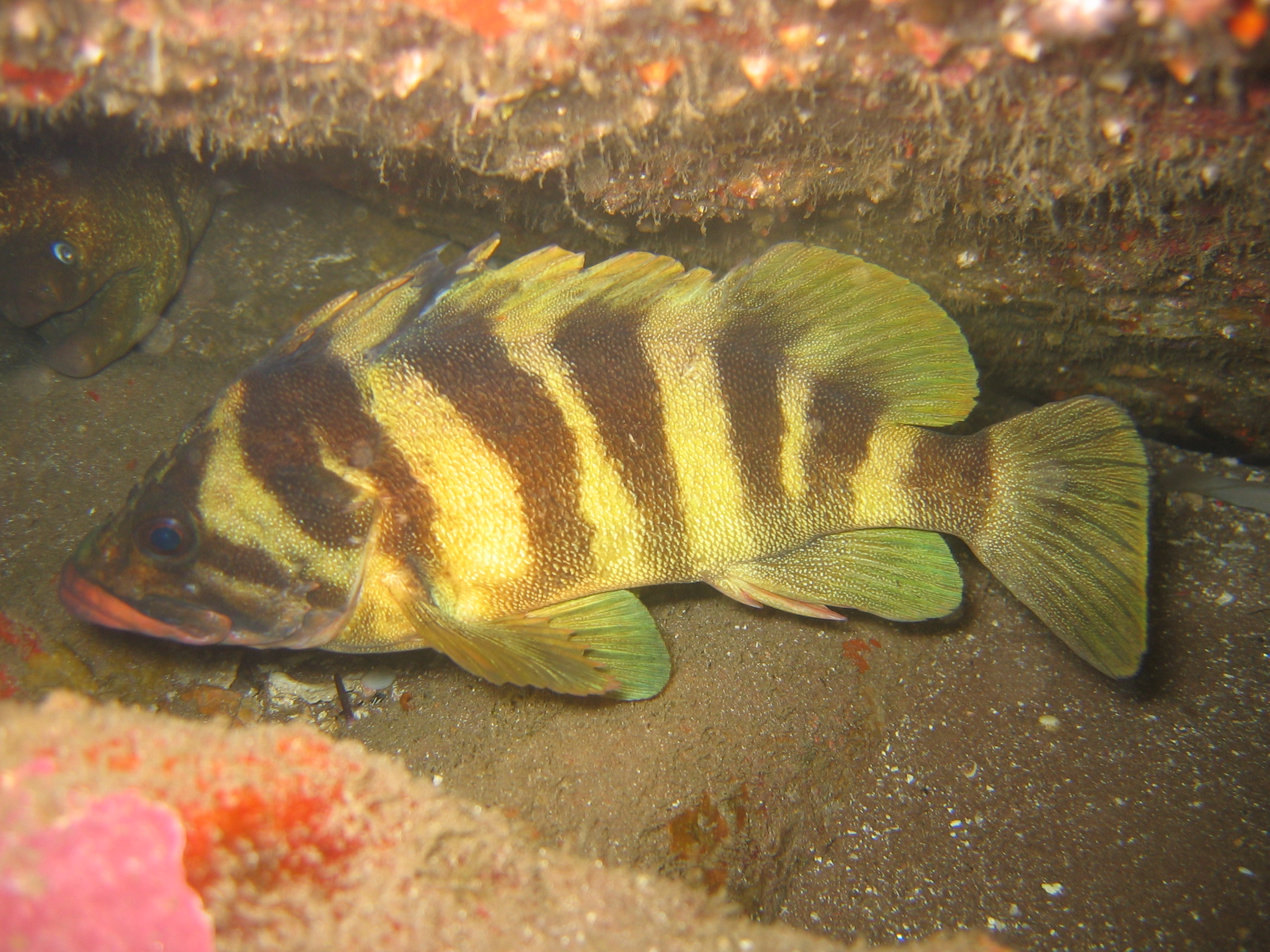
- At Coronados Islands, Mexico

Scientific classification
- Kingdom: Animalia
- Phylum: Chordata
- Class: Actinopterygii
- Order: Perciformes
- Family: Scorpaenidae
- Genus: Sebastes
- Species: S. serriceps

Binomial name
- Sebastes serriceps (D. S. Jordan & C. H. Gilbert, 1880)

Synonyms
- Sebastichthys serriceps Jordan & Gilbert, 1880

= Treefish =

Species of fish

The treefish (Sebastes serriceps) is a species of marine ray-finned fish belonging to the subfamily Sebastinae, the rockfishes, part of the family Scorpaenidae. It is native to the eastern Pacific Ocean.

== Taxonomy ==
The treefish was first formally described as Sebastichthys serriceps in 1880 by the American ichthyologists David Starr Jordan and Charles Henry Gilbert with the type locality given as Santa Catalina and Santa Barbara in California. Some authorities place this species in the monotypic subgenus Sebastocarus. The specific name serriceps is a compound of serri meaning "serrated" and ceps which means "head", a reference to the strong spines aligned on the top of the head giving it a serrated appearance.

== Description ==
The treefish has a robust oblong-shaped body which has a depth equivalent to 36% to 40% of its standard length. The head has a covering of many spines and it has a pointed snout, small eyes, and a medium sized terminal mouth. The dorsal fin has 13 spines and 13 to 15 soft rays while the anal fin has 3 spines and 5 to 7 soft rays. This species attains a maximum total length of 41 cm (16 in) and a maximum published weight of 16 kg (35 lb). The color pattern of the treefish is distinctive with the adults having bright red lips. The overall color is yellow with 6 black vertical bars and numerous white dots or dashes, the margins of the scales being white. The orbit is vermilion and there are two black bars radiating from the eye.

== Distribution and habitat ==
The treefish is found in the eastern Pacific Ocean along the western coast of North America from Guerrero Negro in Baja California north to San Francisco, California. This is a demersal species with a depth range of 5 to 90 m (16 to 295 ft). It can be found in exposed and sheltered rock areas as well as in kelp forests.

== Biology ==
The treefish is a nocturnal ambush predator feeding on benthic invertebrates and smaller fishes. It is a solitary and highly territorial species living in areas of complex and high relief, hiding in crevices and cavities with just the head exposed. Like other Sebastes rockfishes it is ovoviviparous, and the females release larvae in March to July, the juvenuiles shelter among mats of floating kelp with the young fish settling onto the substrate in June to October. They are thought to live for up to 25 years.

== Fisheries ==
The treefish is an important species to the nearshore recreational fishery and in commercial fisheries in southern California and Mexico.
