= Beachgoing =

Leisure activity and cultural phenomenon

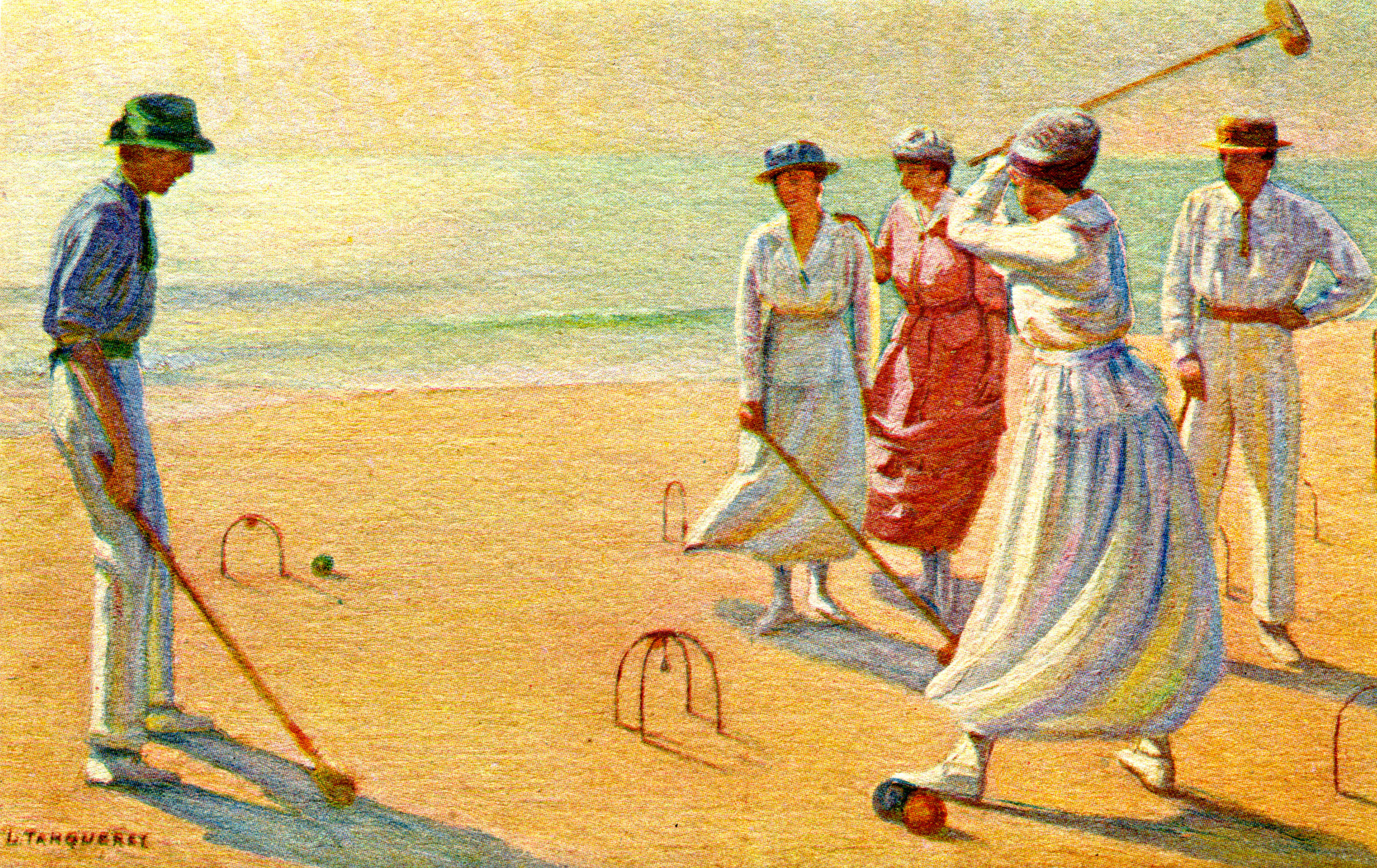
Beachgoers c. 1910

Beachgoing or beach tourism is the cultural phenomenon of travelling to an ocean beach for leisure or vacation.

The practice developed from medically-prescribed sea-bathing by British physicians in the 17th and 18th centuries and spread throughout Europe and European colonies. With the advent of affordable air travel seaside resorts developed worldwide into the modern tourism phenomenon.

Beachgoing is one of the earliest forms of modern tourism and is a staple of the overall tourism industry.

== Background ==
Seaside resorts have existed since antiquity. In Roman times, the town of Baiae, by the Tyrrhenian Sea in Italy, was a resort for those who were sufficiently prosperous. Barcola in northern Italy, with its Roman luxury villas, is considered a special example of ancient leisure culture by the sea. Mersea Island, in Essex, England was a seaside holiday destination for wealthy Romans living in Colchester.

Beaches in 16th-century Europe historically were seen as frightening places where piracy, invasions, and destruction by hurricanes, king tides, and tsunamis were an unpredictable danger. Most seaside and beach communities were fishing villages which regularly lost community members to storms or piracy. Most sailors and other community members were nonswimmers, and losses to drowning were common. Swimming in the ocean itself was seen as dangerous because of the possibility of shark attack. Prior to the 18th century, vacationing at the beach was not a cultural phenomenon. According to The Atlantic, "only peasants sought refuge from the heat in the cool seawater".

== History ==
=== Sea-bathing ===
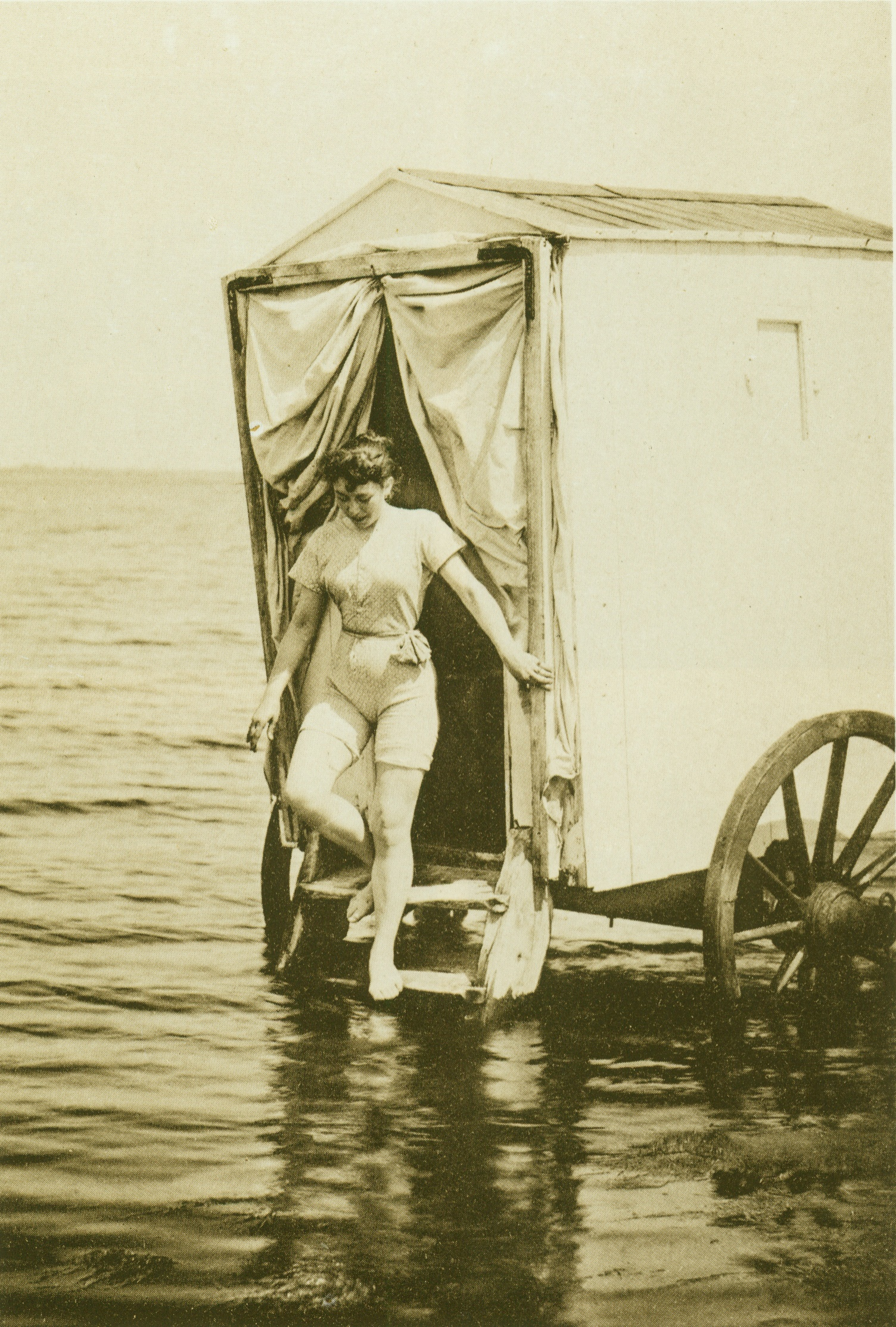
A woman exits a bathing machine in 1893

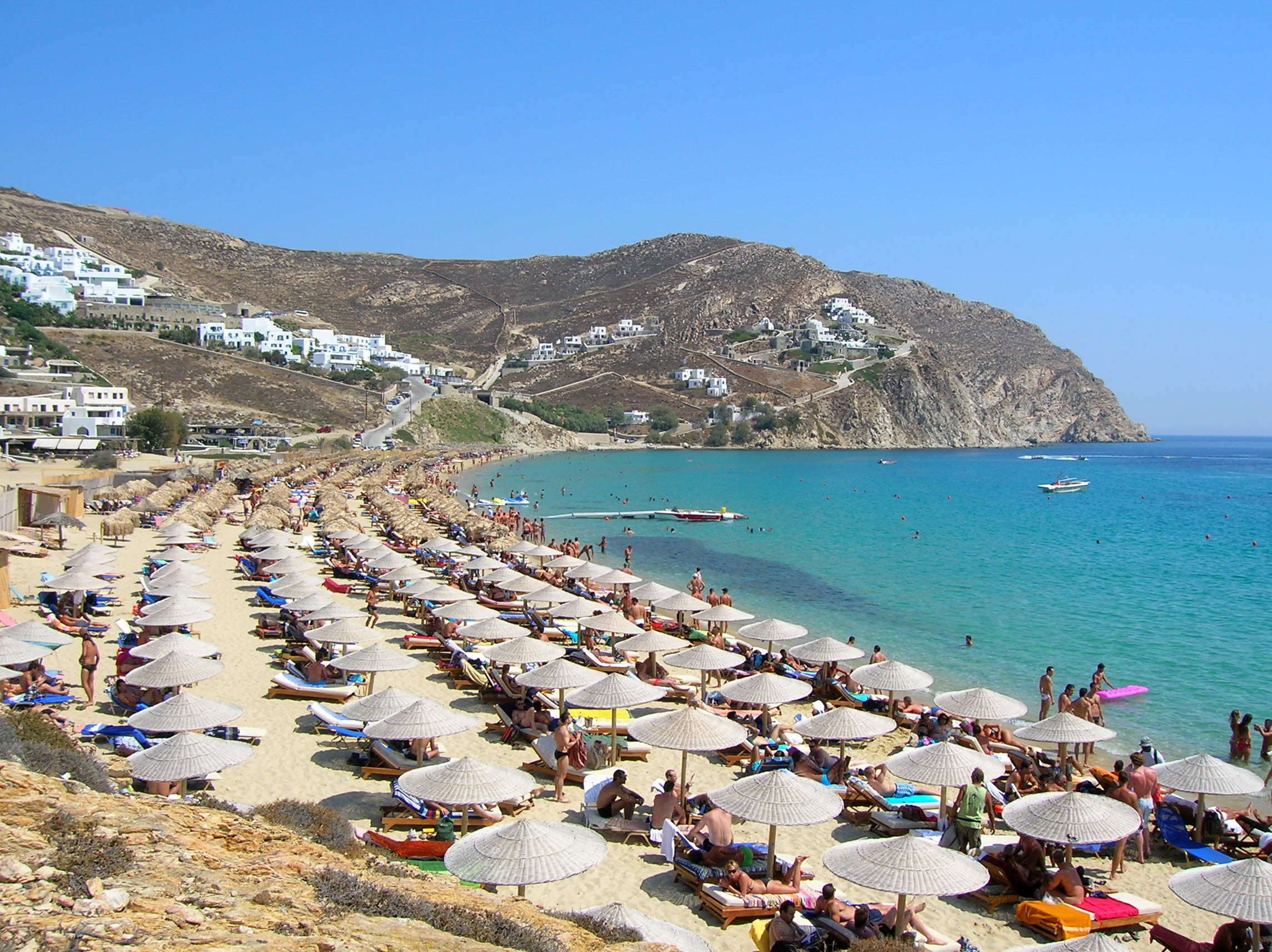
Elia beach on Mykonos island, Greece

Beginning in the 1600s and 1700s, British physicians recommended sea-bathing to promote or restore health. The 1750 essay by Richard Russell, A Dissertation on the Use of Seawater in the Diseases of the Glands, Particularly, the Scurvy, Jaundice, King’s Evil, Leprosy and the Glandular Consumption recommended bathing in the sea and drinking a pint of seawater daily; Russell claimed to have cured a leprosy patient with this treatment "every morning during nine months, without any intervals".

According to Smithsonian sea-bathing was prescribed for people suffering from 'melancholy, rickets, leprosy, gout, impotence, tubercular infections, menstrual problems and “hysteria” ' Travelling to the beach for prescribed short bathes and to drink sea water and breathe "sea air", which was theorized to contain more oxygen, became a habit of affluent people. Bathing machines, operated by bathing attendants, were commonly used to perform the prescribed dips into seawater. Women bathed in bathing costumes; men bathed nude.

As the primary reason for early travel to seaside towns was for a prescribed daily five-minute dip, resorts built up to entertain the affluent visitors for the remaining portion of each day. The first such resort was at Scarborough near York. As travel conditions improved with trains and better roads, less affluent travellers were also able to join in the pastime, resort communities built up in many seaside towns, and the phenomenon spread throughout Europe and European colonies.

A similar progression of events developed in Rio de Janeiro in the 19th and 20th centuries, as therapeutic sea-bathing developed into a place "to see and be seen", with beach culture developing into a defining characteristic of the city.

=== The seaside in art ===
Paintings of seascapes, a term that was coined around 1800, became more popular. Some tourism was associated with travel to seaside towns to see the subjects of such paintings.

=== Modern beach tourism ===
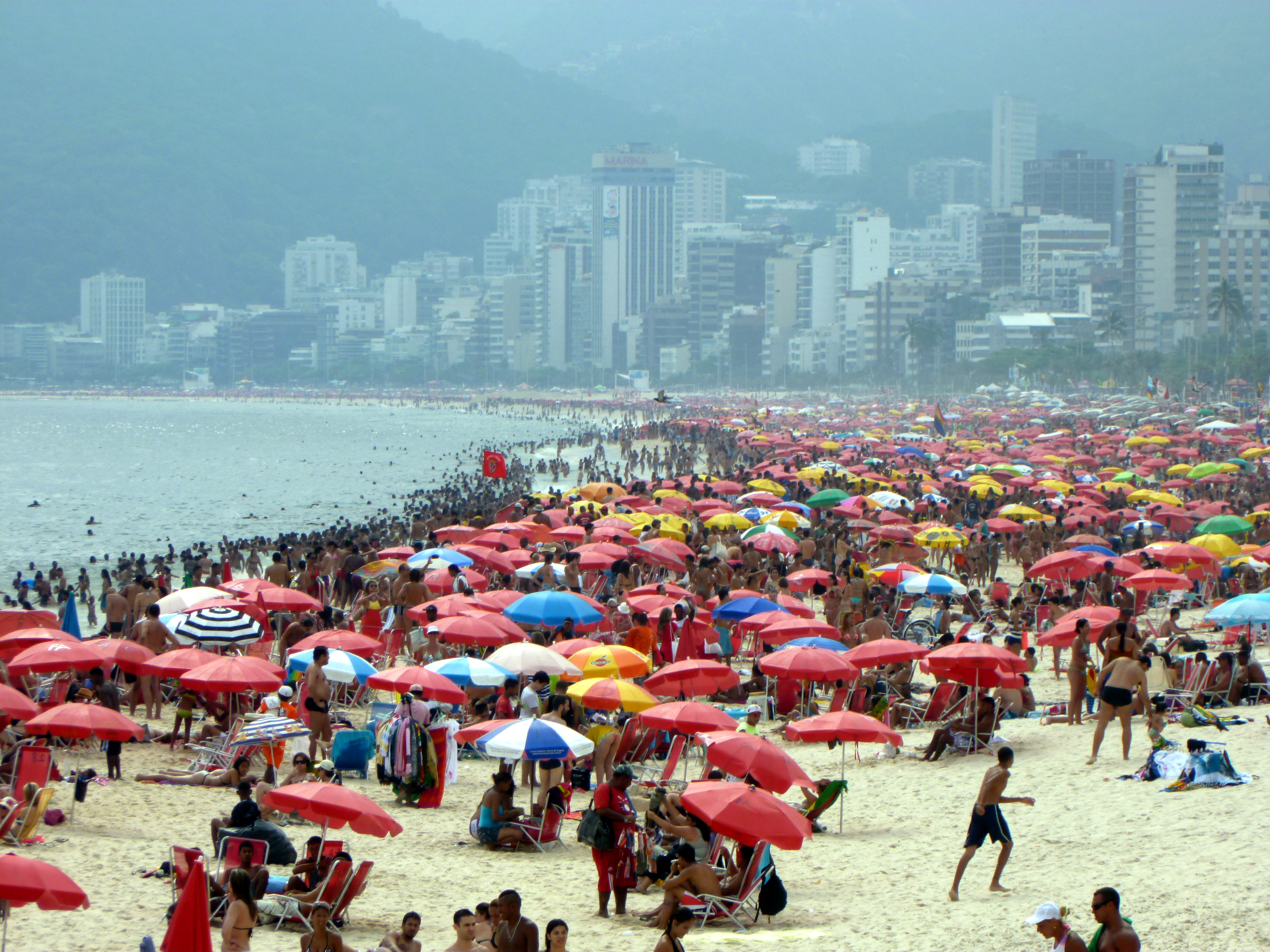
Ipanema beach in Rio de Janeiro c. 2010

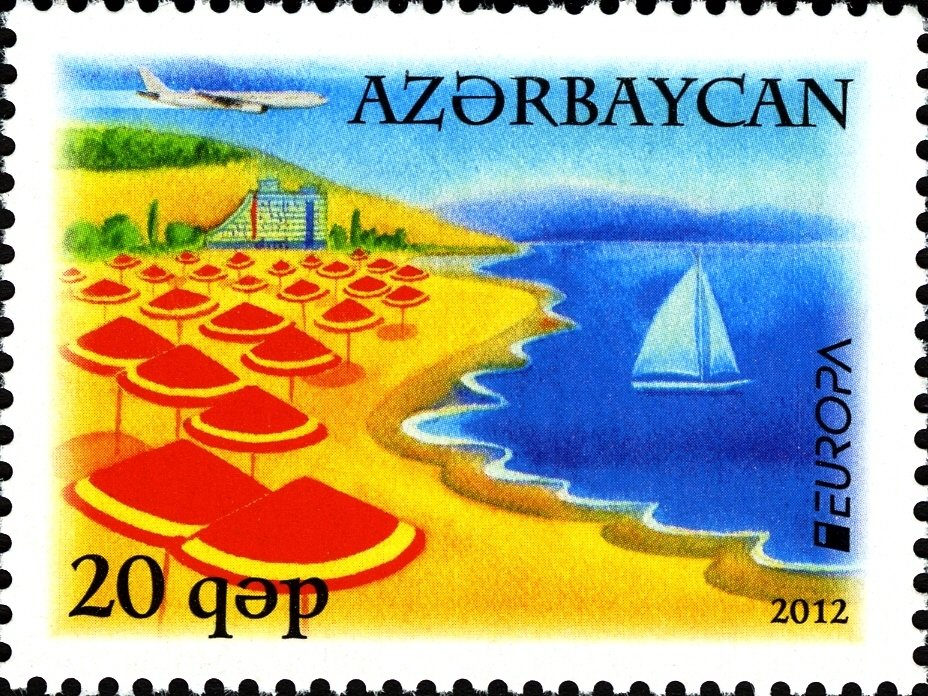
2012 Ajerbaijani stamp promoting beach tourism

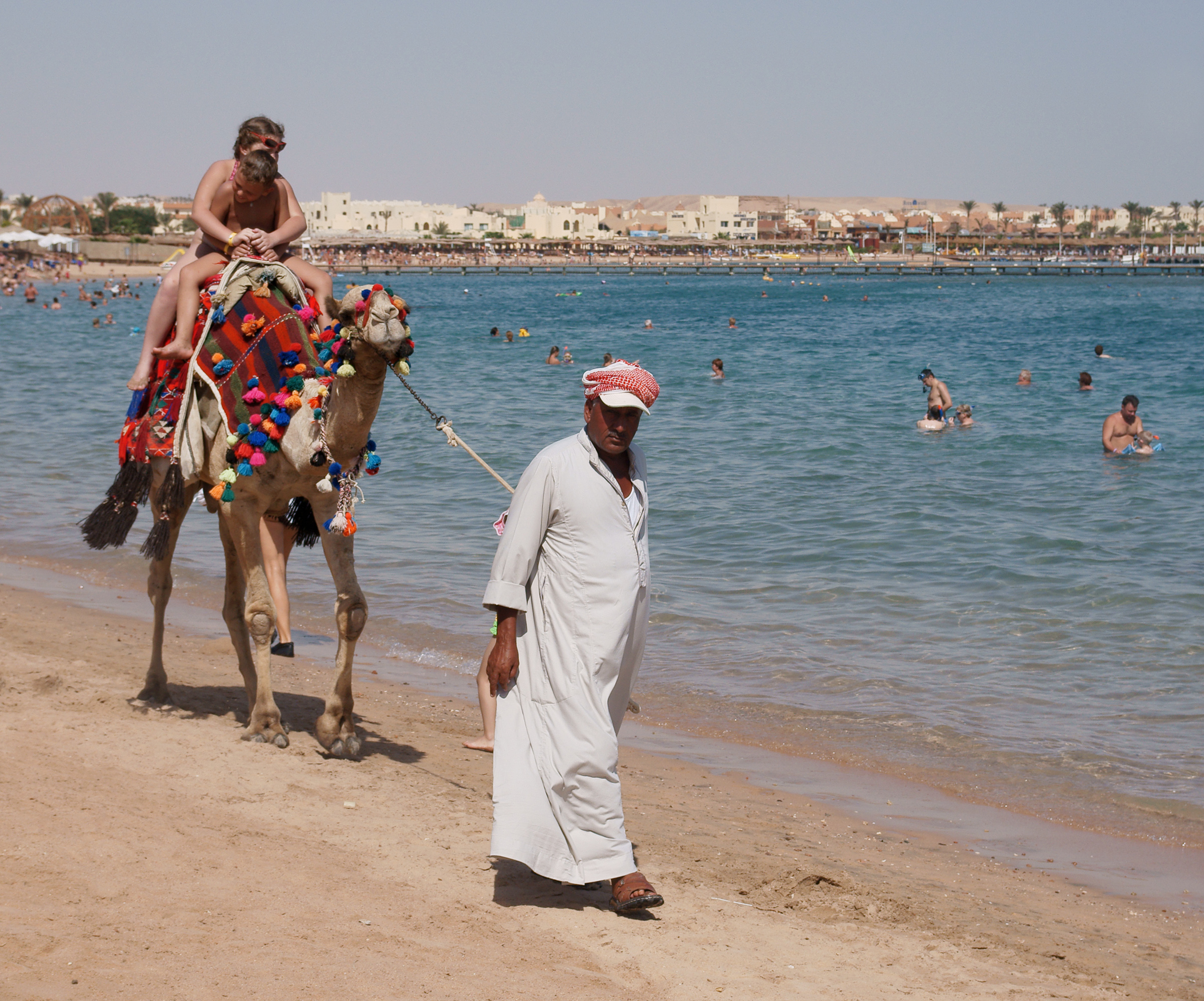
Tourists riding a camel on the beach in Makadi Bay, Egypt c. 2010

Sea-bathing remained a popular treatment for tuberculosis into the mid-1800s, by which time beachgoing had developed into a leisure activity meant to provide a respite from daily life. Beach tourism is one of the earliest form of modern tourism. Beachgoers, however, were not there for the sun; women typically kept themselves completely covered or used shelters and parasols to protect their skin from tanning.

By the early 1900s, seaside vacations had become a cultural phenomenon in Europe and North America and the therapeutic benefits of sunlight began to be recognized and by 1913 "sunbathing" was referred to as a desirable activity for the leisured class. In the 1920s, after fashion-designer Coco Chanel accidentally got sunburnt while visiting the French Riviera, tanned skin became perceived as fashionable, healthy, and luxurious. Jean Patou capitalized on the new tanning fad, launching the first sun tan oil "Huile de Chaldee" in 1927. In the 1940s, advertisements started appearing in women's magazines which encouraged sunbathing. At the same time, swimsuits' skin coverage began decreasing, with the bikini radically changing swimsuit style after it made its appearance in 1946.

In some areas with beaches, hostile architecture was used to keep populations seen as less welcome away; in the 1920s American urban planner Robert Moses designed a stretch of Long Island Southern State Parkway with low stone bridges so that buses could not pass under them. This made it more difficult for people who relied on public transportation, mainly African Americans, to visit the beach that wealthier car-owners could visit. Other areas, particularly in the US, designated certain days of the week during which persons of color or non-Christians were admitted to public beaches or passed parking bans to exclude non-residents. Black Americans developed beach resorts catering to persons of color, such as American Beach, Bethune Beach, Bruce's Beach, Butler Beach, Oak Bluffs, Pacific Beach Club, Paradise Park, and Sag Harbor. As recently as 2020 some areas in the US legally permitted restricting access to public beaches by allowing beach parking areas to be placed long distances from the shore and providing bridge access only to local residents.

As air travel became affordable and common, beachside towns throughout the tropics and subtropics developed seaside resorts to attract tourists. Seaside resorts in temperate climates became less exclusive. Beach tourism developed into one of the staples of the tourism industry.

According to Reader's Digest in 2021 the most-visited beaches in the world are Whitehaven Beach in Australia, Lanikai Beach in Hawaii, Horseshoe Bay in Bermuda, Cayo Coco Beach in Cuba, Bávaro in the Dominican Republic, Boulders Beach in South Africa, Bournemouth in the United Kingdom, Pink Sands Beach in the Bahamas, Ao Nang in Thailand, Playa Paraiso in Mexico, Dreamland Beach in Indonesia, and Grace Bay in Turks and Caicos.
