= Santa Monica State Beach =

State beach in Los Angeles County, California, United States

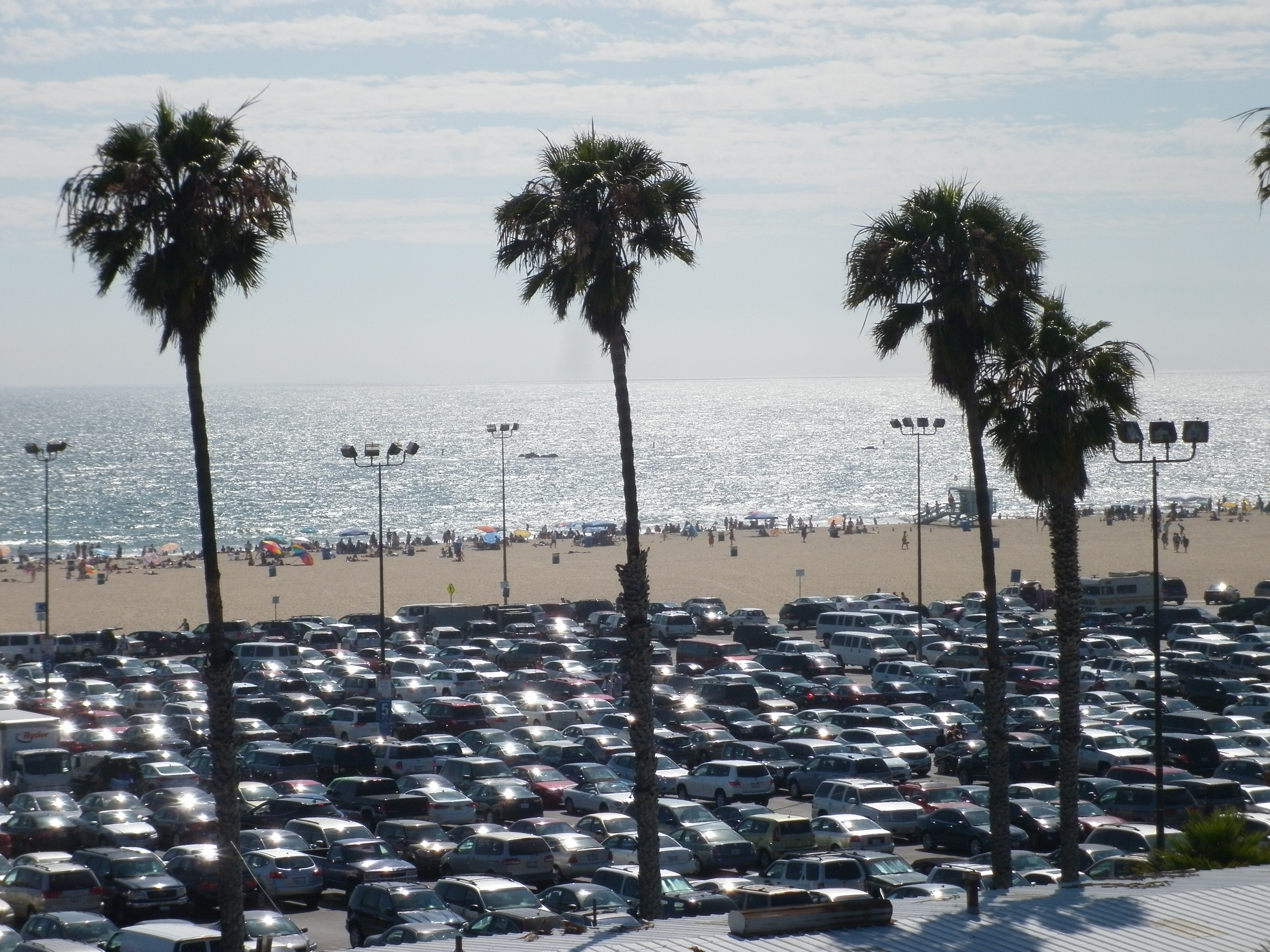

- Location within California Location within the United States
- Location: Los Angeles County, California
- Nearest city: Santa Monica
- Coordinates: 34°0′54″N 118°30′6″W
- Governing body: California Department of Parks and Recreation

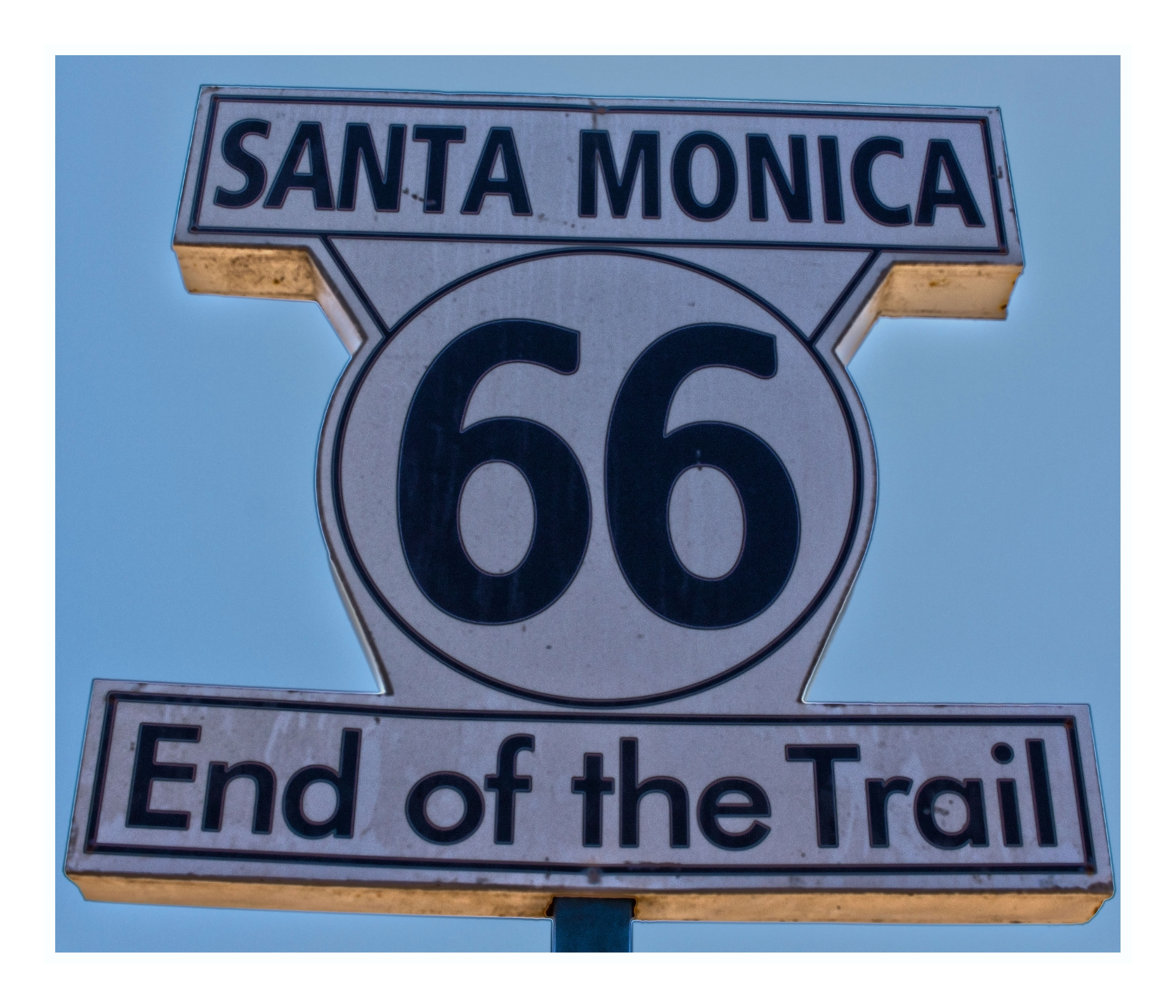
Santa Monica Pier, Route 66 Sign

Santa Monica State Beach is a California State Park operated by the city of Santa Monica.

The beach is located along Pacific Coast Highway. It is 3.5 miles (5.6 km) long and has parks, picnic areas, playgrounds, restrooms, as well as staffed lifeguard stations, the Muscle Beach, bike rentals, concessions, a few hotels, a bike path, and wooden pathways for beachgoers with disabilities. Visitor activities include volleyball, surfing, stand up paddleboarding, and swimming. Smoking at the beach is prohibited.

== Activities ==
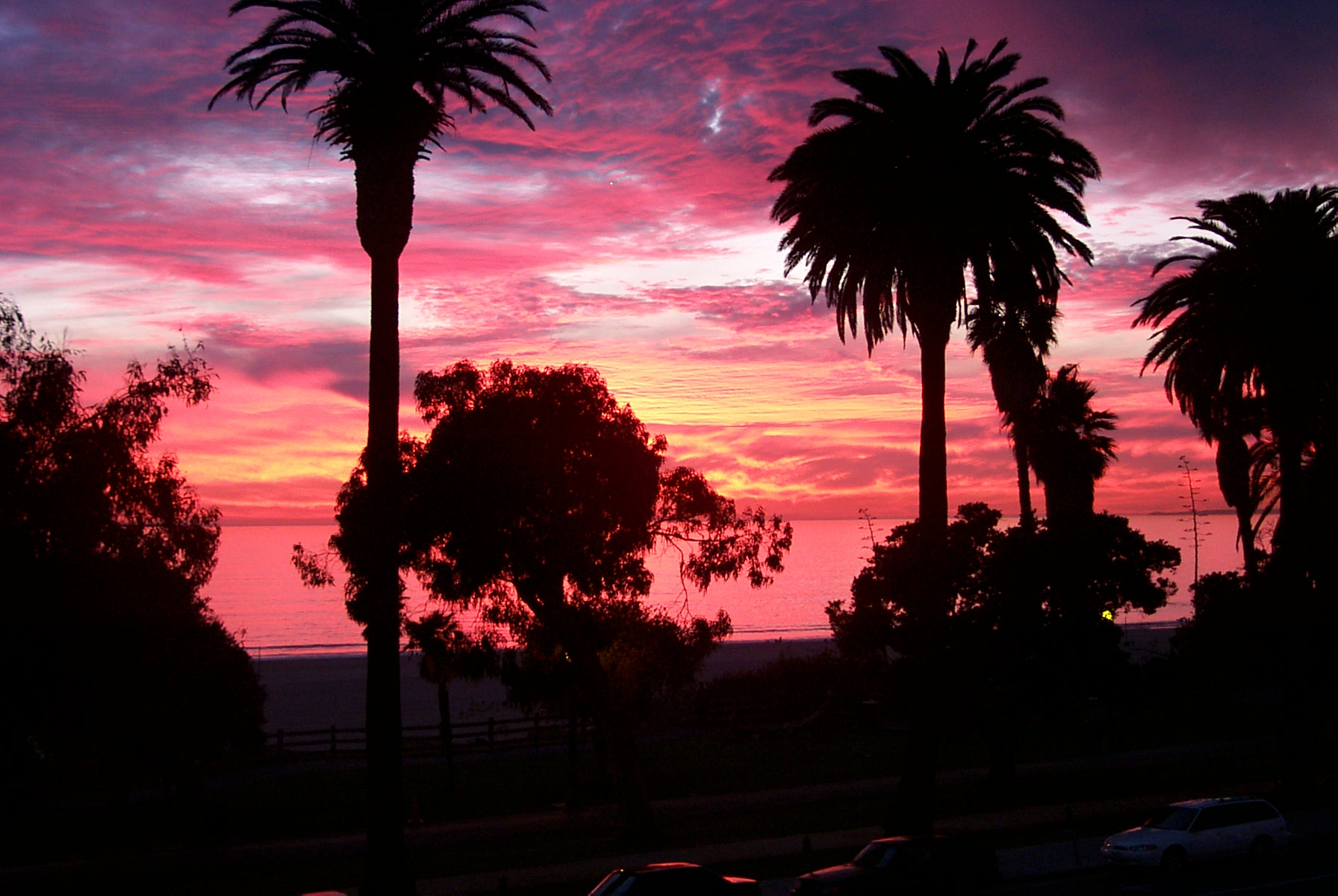
Sunset at Santa Monica Beach

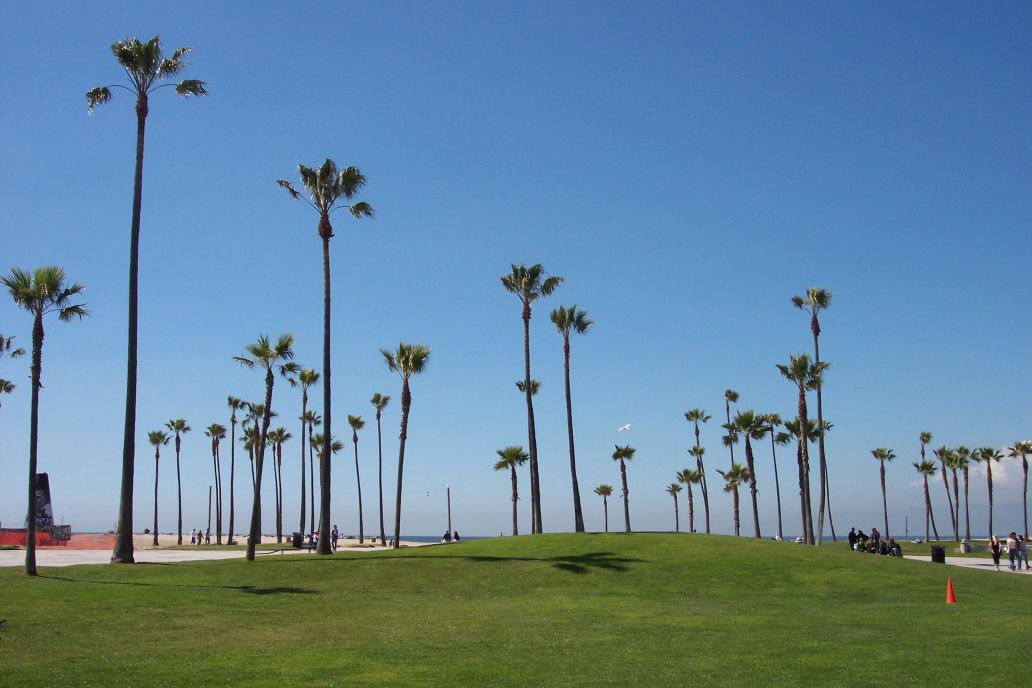
Palms on the beach

At the foot of Colorado Avenue lies the Santa Monica Pier, which dates from 1909. The pier has a National Historic Landmark -– the 1922 Looff Hippodrome Carousel.

Just south of the pier volleyball courts is International Chess Park with public chess tables and a human-scale chessboard set into the sidewalk.

Palisades Park is located atop Santa Monica's cliffs, providing a vantage point to see the Santa Monica Beach and the Pacific Ocean.

The beach is featured in the album art for Umbrella Beach by Owl City.

== Wildlife ==
Snowy Plovers nest on the beach.

In November, 2023, the city announced a plan to restore an additional 5-acre section (2.0 ha) of beach north of the pier into a native coastal strand habitat.

The California Office of Environmental Health Hazard Assessment (OEHHA) has developed a safe eating advisory for fish caught in the Santa Monica Beach based on levels of mercury or PCBs found in local species.

== "Ink Well" ==
A section of the beach was referred to as "Ink Well" and "Negro Beach" in the early 20th century when it was one of the few areas in California where African Americans were allowed to enjoy beach access in a largely segregated society. Other areas for blacks were Bruce's Beach in Manhattan Beach and the Pacific Beach Club in Orange County. Nick Gabaldon, one of the first black surfers in California, lived in Santa Monica, and used the 200 foot roped off stretch of beach demarcated for blacks. He died after crashing into the Malibu Pier.

== Arlington West ==
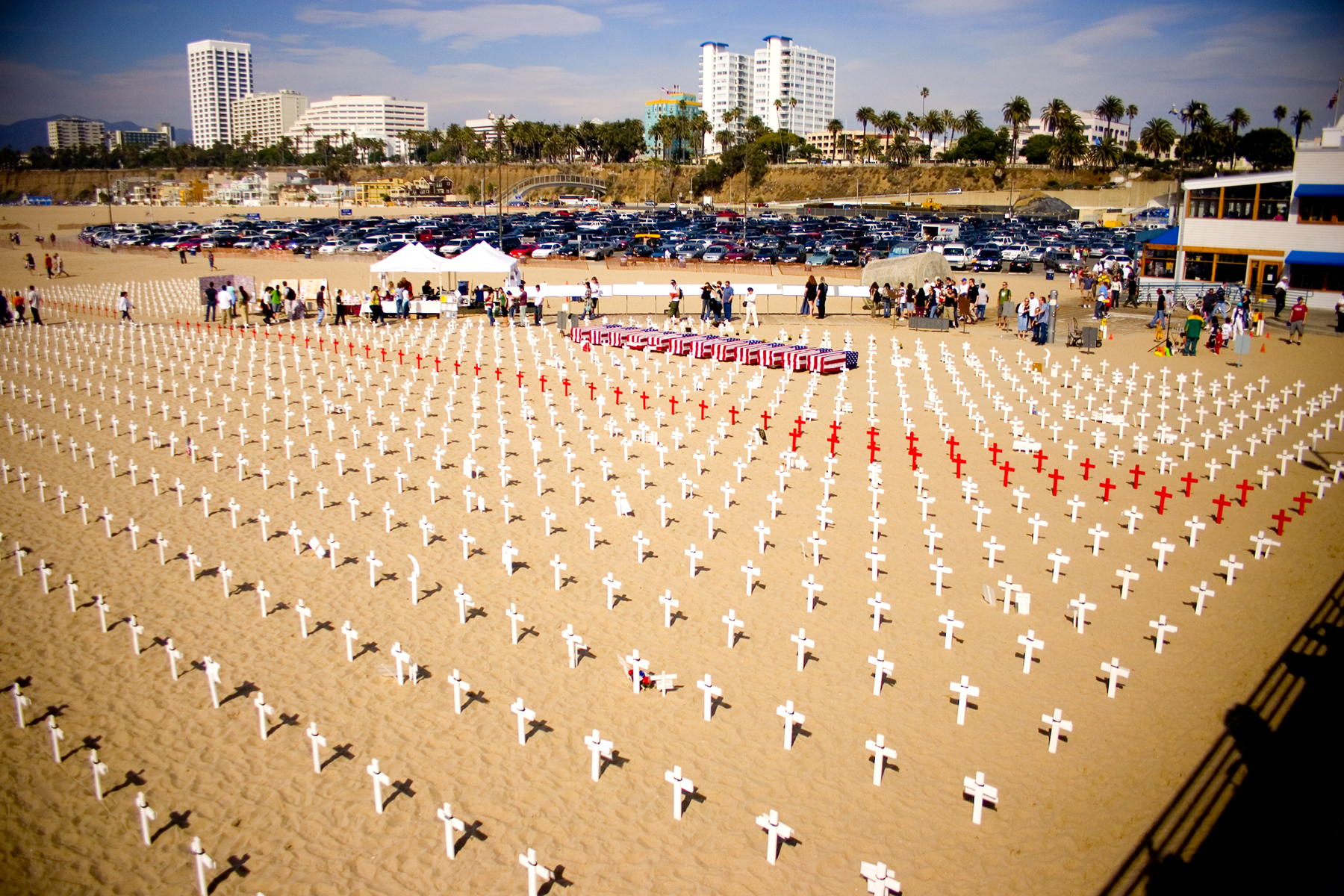
Arlington West

Arlington West was a temporary memorial created on Santa Monica Beach just north of the Santa Monica Pier at Santa Monica, every Sunday from sunrise to sunset. Crosses are placed on the beach for each U.S. military person who has died in the Iraq War. The number of crosses erected every Sunday now exceeds 4,000. For military personnel killed within the week past, flag draped coffins with blue crosses are positioned in front. The Arlington West Memorial, a project of Veterans For Peace, is intended to offer visitors a graceful, visually and emotionally powerful, place for reflection.

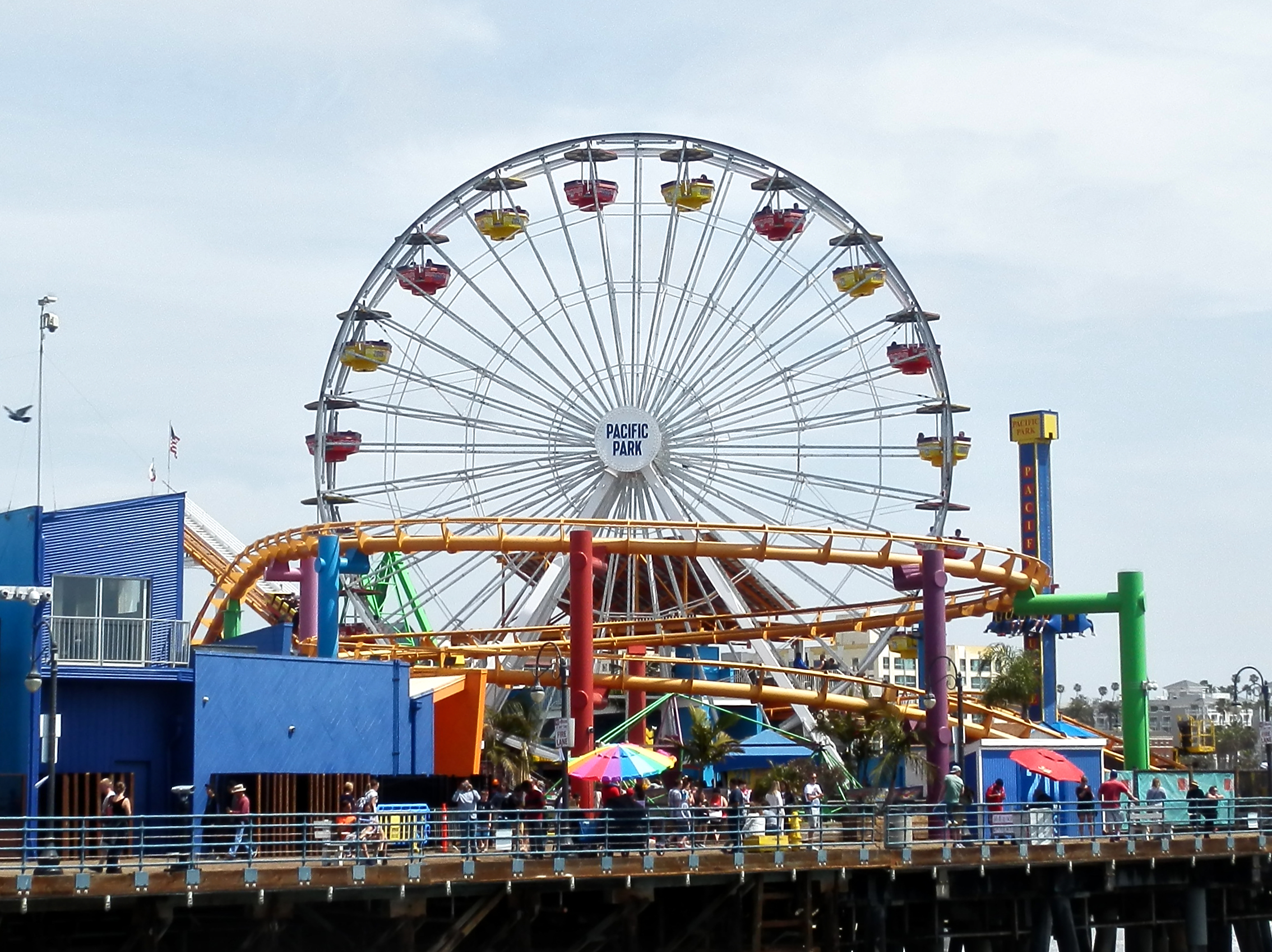
The Santa Monica Ferris Wheel.

== Gallery of images ==
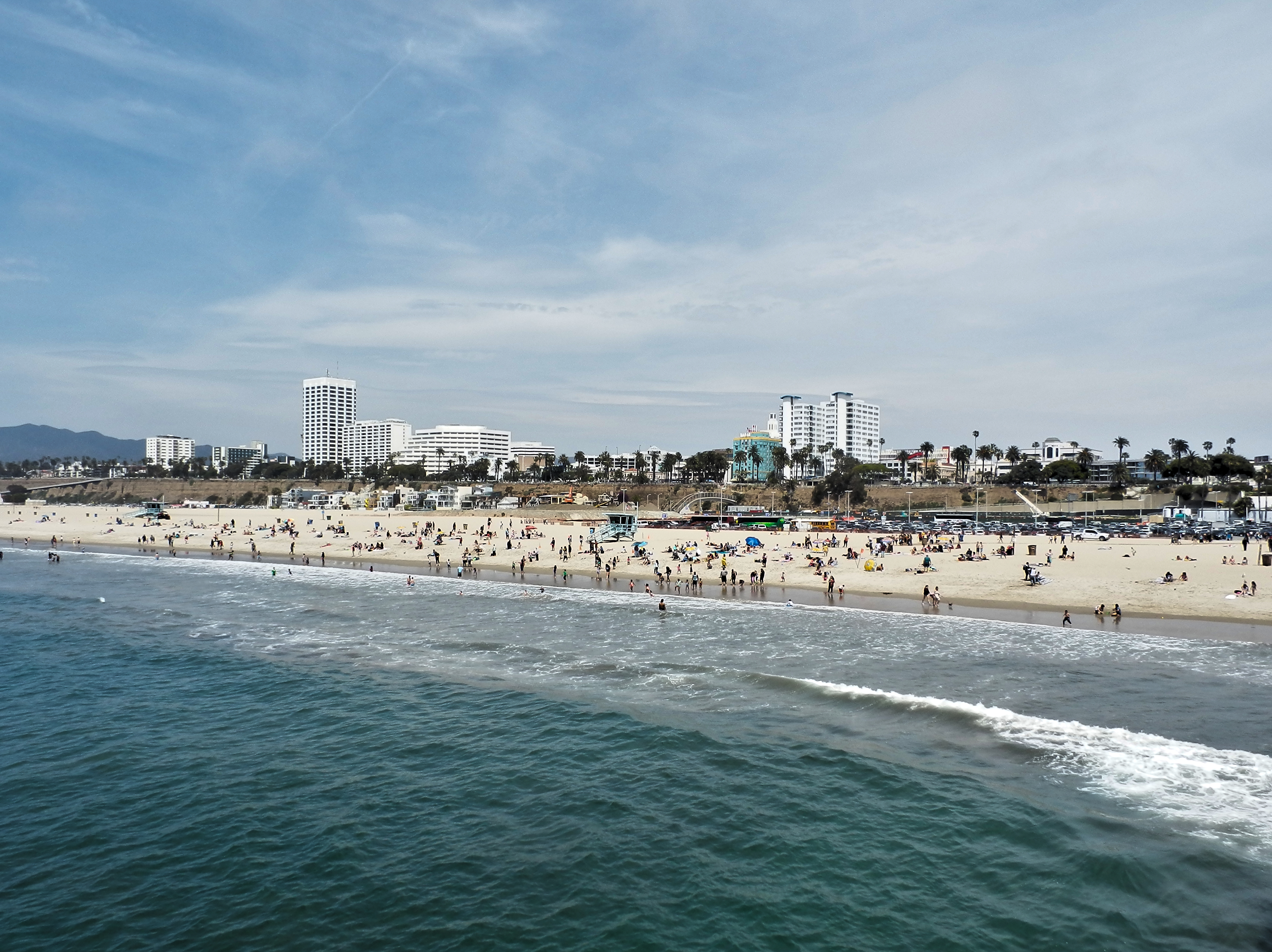
View from ocean

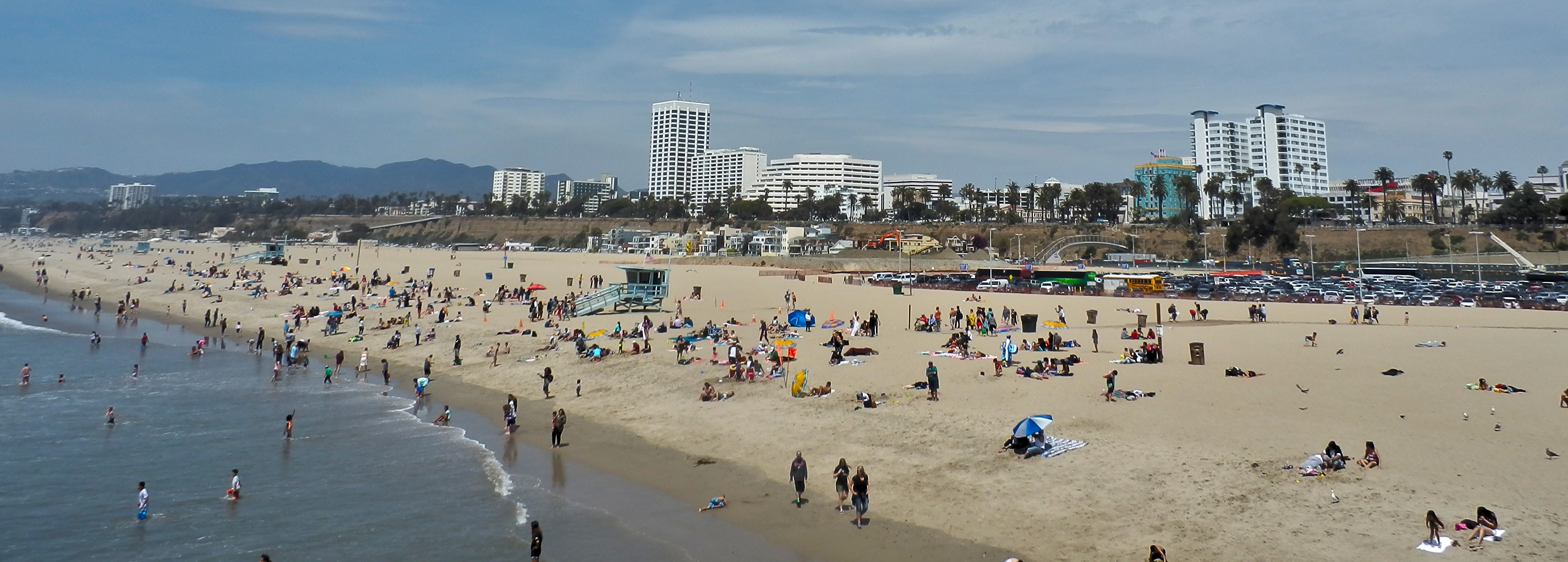
View from ocean

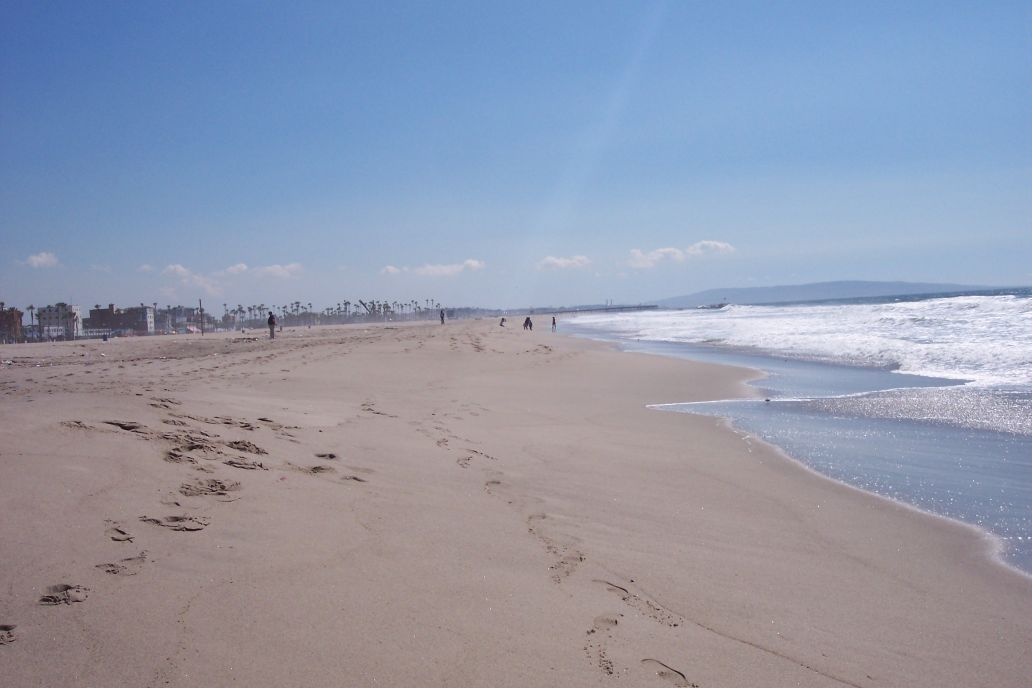
Santa Monica Beach

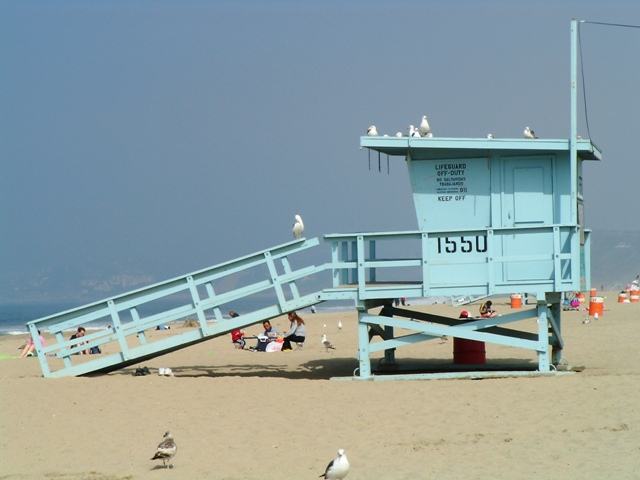
Lifeguard tower

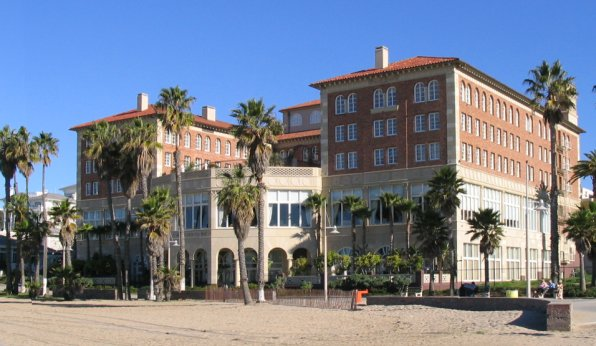
Casa Del Mar Hotel

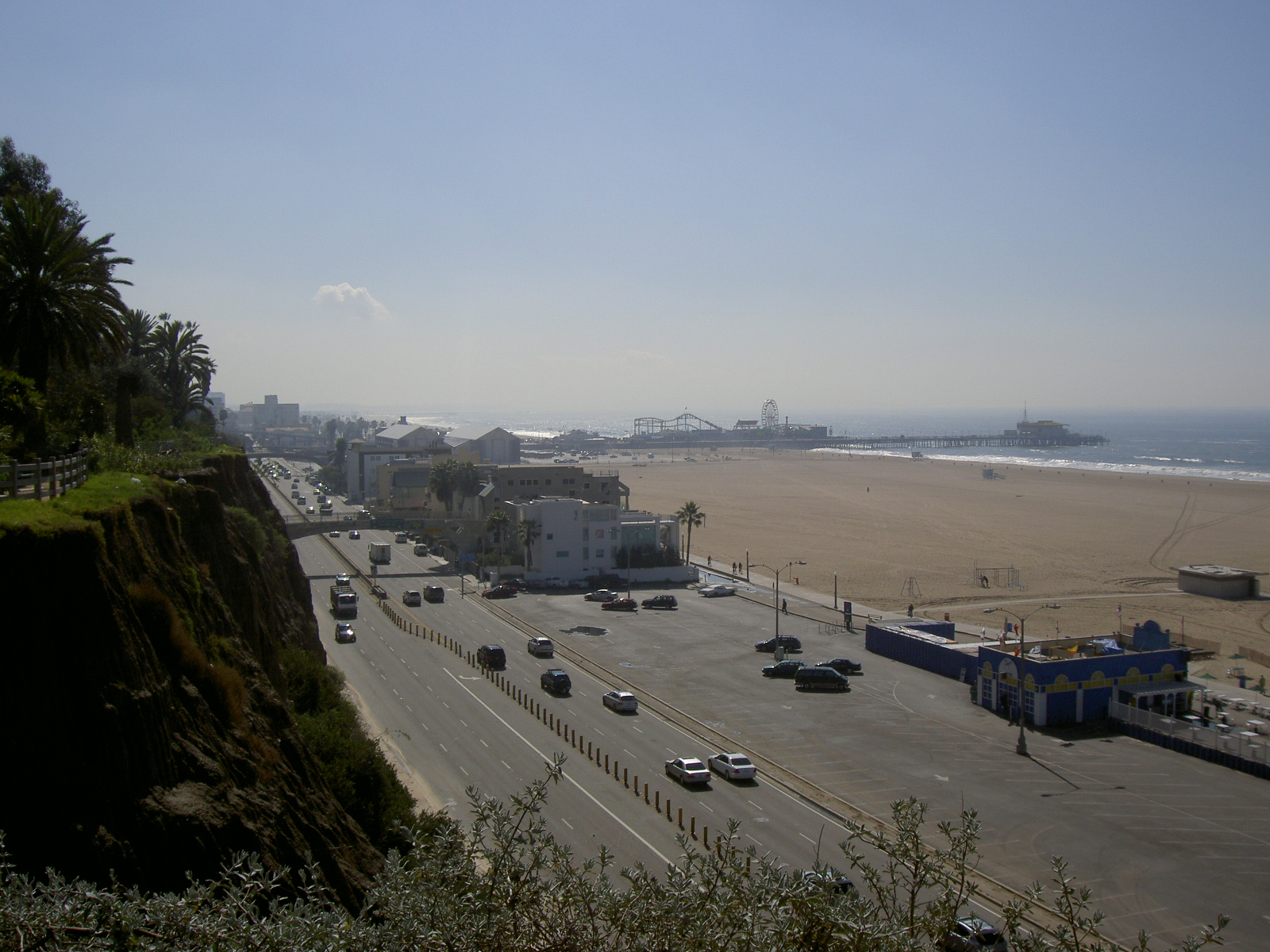
Santa Monica Beach

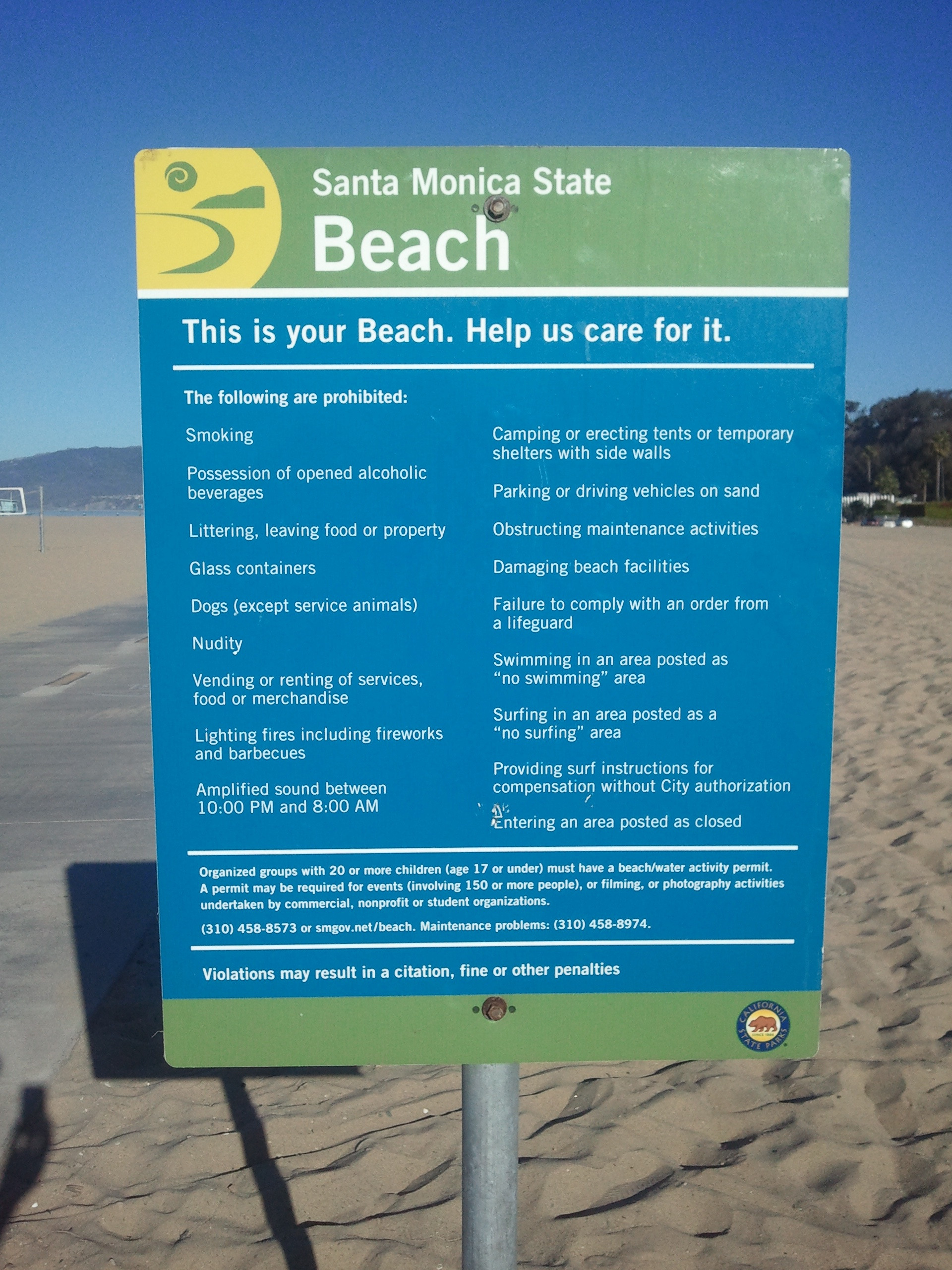
Informational sign

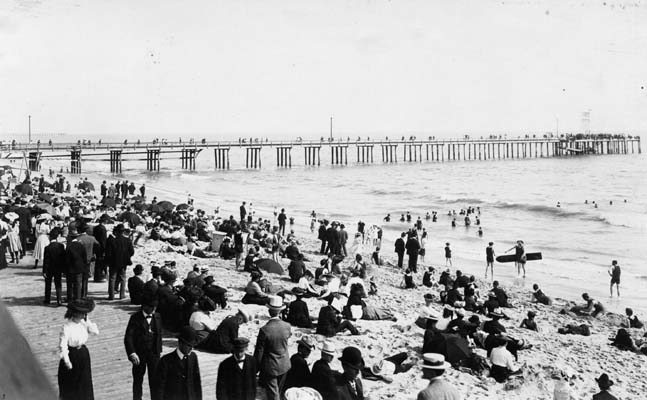
On the beach 1880

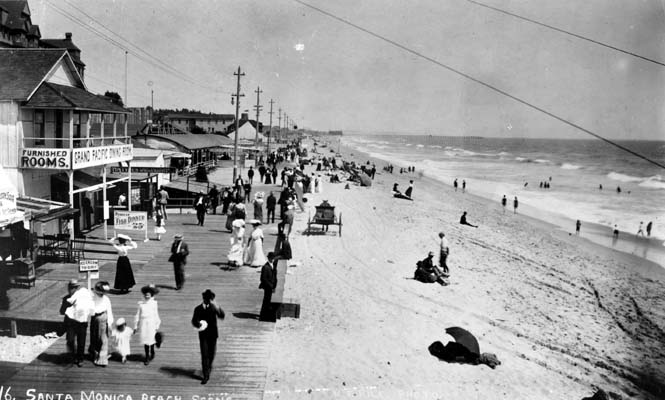
Santa Monica Beach 1890

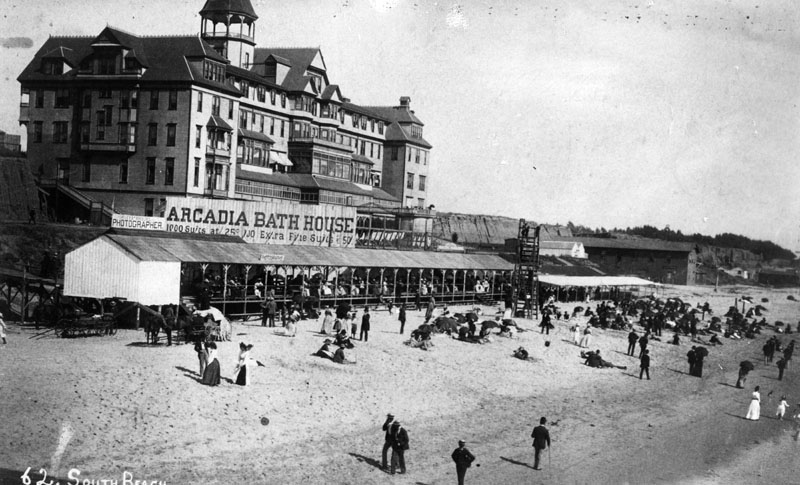
Arcadia Hotel 1890

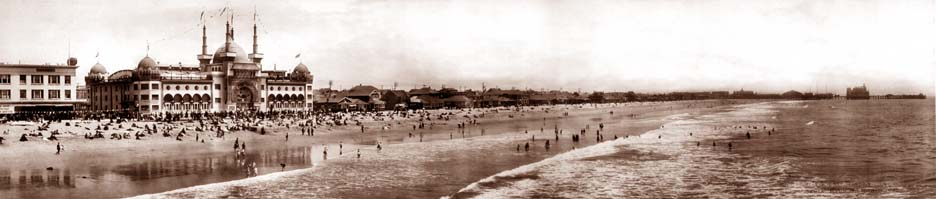
Santa Monica Beach 1908

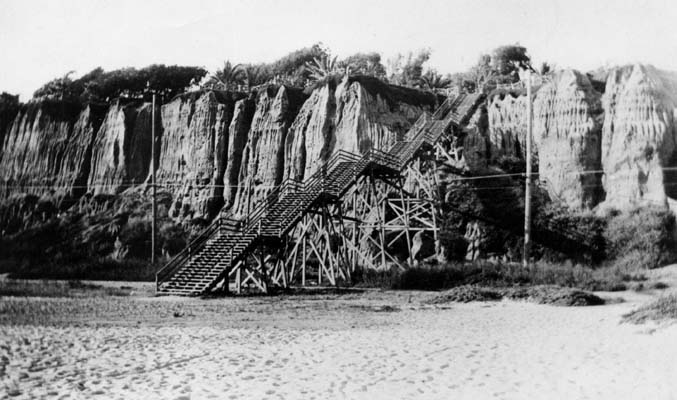
Steps down the palisades 1915

== See also ==
- List of beaches in California
- List of California state parks
- Santa Monica Pier Aquarium — Aquarium on the pier operated by Heal the Bay, and formerly known as the Ocean Discovery Center
- Pacific Park — the amusement park portion of the pier
- Hot Dog on a Stick — original, opened in 1946, found on the sidewalk just south of the pier in front of the original Muscle Beach
- Pacific Ocean Park — former (1958–1967) amusement park one pier south of Santa Monica Pier; demolished in 1974
- Membership discrimination in California social clubs
