= El Porto, Manhattan Beach, California =

Neighborhood of Manhattan Beach, California

Coordinates: 33.903274°N 118.419039°W

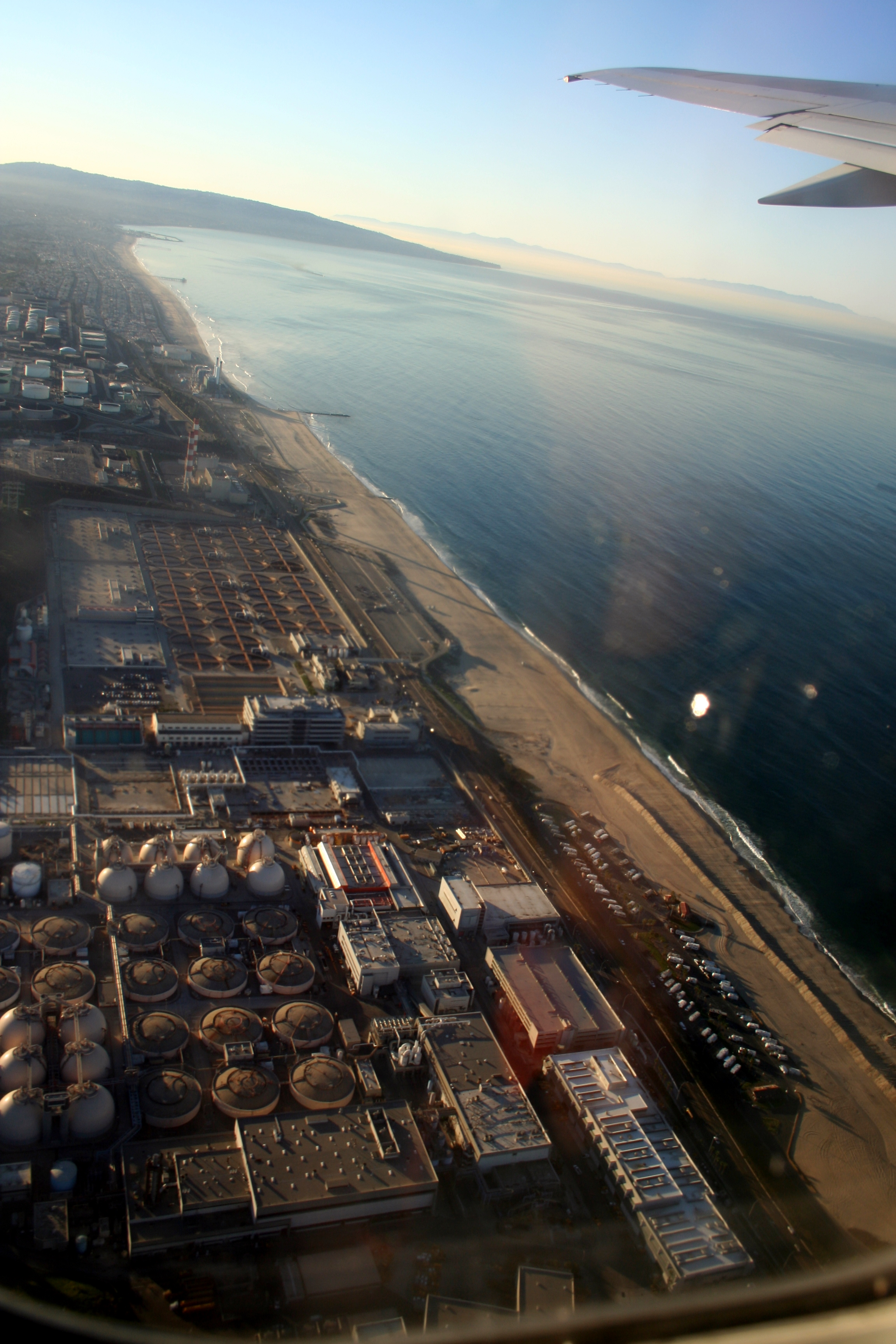
An aerial shot of the Hyperion Chevron oil refinery of El Segundo, El Porto in the background.

El Porto is a beach community that is part of northernmost Manhattan Beach, a city in the South Bay area of Greater Los Angeles in Southern California.

The boundary of El Porto is 45th Street on the north, which is the border with El Segundo, and its El Segundo Energy Center Power Plant to the west and its Chevron oil refinery to the east; the southern border is 38th Street, which was the old border with Manhattan; the east-west boundary is Crest Drive, next to the fence of El Segundo's oil refinery, to El Porto State Beach and the Pacific Ocean.

The commercial section of El Porto is along Highland Avenue, which is its only main thoroughfare. North of 45th Street, Highland becomes Vista Del Mar Boulevard, which runs along the coast to Playa del Rey.

Residents of El Porto are currently zoned to Grandview Elementary School by the Manhattan Beach Unified School District. Fire and Police Services are generally provided by the downtown police and fire facility.

== History ==
El Porto was subdivided in 1911 on land owned by developer George H. Peck. There were 83 business lots, 225 residential lots, on sandy soil partly covered with large trees, and ocean view sand lots. Included were concrete sidewalks and curbs, oiled streets and artesian water that was piped in the streets.

The 30-by-90 foot lots, laid out by Peck, were each between a street and an alley. At first, no names were given to the streets. Numbers were later assigned to the east-west streets and names to the alleys. The alley between 39th and 40th Streets, for instance, is named El Porto Street.

Although it is thought to mean "The Port" in Spanish, the name is actually a misspelling and translates "The I Carry." The Spanish word for port should have actually been spelled p-u-e-r-t-o. However, "porto" is the Portuguese word for "port," but its article is "O" instead of "El," which leads one to believe the origin of the name El Porto could have come from both Spanish and Portuguese influences.

For over six decades, El Porto was a county island that was part of the El Segundo Unified School District.

In November 1980, the unincorporated town of El Porto, consisting of approximately 34 acres (140,000 m^{2}) and a population of about 1,185 people, was annexed from the County of Los Angeles by Manhattan Beach.

== See also ==
- El Porto State Beach
