= Peck's Pier and Pavilion =

Former pier in Manhattan Beach, California, USA

Coordinates: 33°53′53″N 118°25′14″W

Peck's Pier was a wooden pier in Manhattan Beach, California, constructed in 1908 by George H. Peck, for whom it was named. Peck was a wealthy real estate developer who owned a lot of property in the area. The pier was located in the area of 33rd and 34th Street and was the only pier in the area open to African Americans.

Peck's Pier and Pavilion was a "promotional attraction" for dances, parties, picnics, and roller skating. According to the city's website, it was destroyed in a 1913 storm, and the pavilion was destroyed in 1920 due to "timber rot". Another source, however, suggests Peck's Pier was torn down by "a combination of storms and social injustice", the same injustice that also put a stop to Bruce's Beach, a nearby black-owned beach resort, and chased off black residents.

The town's first pier, which was conceived to attract new home buyers, above a "newfangled machine to convert the power of the waves into electricity to light the pier", was built in 1901 (Center Street pier, where Manhattan Beach Pier is now located) on what became Manhattan Beach Boulevard. Another wooden pier on Marine Avenue was also built in 1901.

== See also ==
- African American resorts
- Bruce's Beach
- Manhattan Beach Pier
- Hermosa Beach Pier
- Redondo Beach Pier
