= George H. Peck =

American real estate developer

George Huntington Peck, Jr.
- Born: October 15, 1856; San Francisco, California, United States
- Died: January 9, 1940 (aged 83); Los Angeles, California
- Occupation: Real estate developer
- Known for: Wealthy landowner in California

George Huntington Peck Jr. (October 15, 1856 – January 9, 1940) was an American real estate broker, developer and millionaire.

== Early life ==
George Peck Jr. was born in San Francisco, California.

== Career ==
He began his career as a railroad conductor and is credited with driving the first Southern Pacific train into San Pedro. Convinced of the need for harbor facilities, he later bought land along the seashore and, in 1890–despite little formal education–established the first bank in San Pedro.

Peck eventually acquired virtually all of San Pedro and much of the north part of what became Manhattan Beach. He also subdivided and laid out the small town of El Porto, originally called "Peck's Beach", which was eventually annexed by Manhattan Beach and became part of its north end. He built Peck's Pier. Among his larger real estate transactions were the sale of properties for the Standard Oil (now Chevron) refinery at what became El Segundo and the Army's Fort MacArthur at San Pedro.

== Death and legacy ==
George Peck died at age 83 in his home located at 1315 W. Adams Boulevard in Los Angeles, in the West Adams District, leaving an estate valued at $5,000,000. Much of his estate was left in trusts for his chronically ill children, with the remaining value defaulting to the city upon their deaths. He is interred in the Mausoleum of the Golden West, Sanctuary of Faith at Inglewood Park Cemetery, Inglewood, California.

Streets in San Pedro and Manhattan Beach bear his name.

== See also ==
- Bruce's Beach
