= El Porto Beach =

Beach in Santa Monica Bay, California, United States

Coordinates: 33°54′12.14″N 118°25′17.64″W

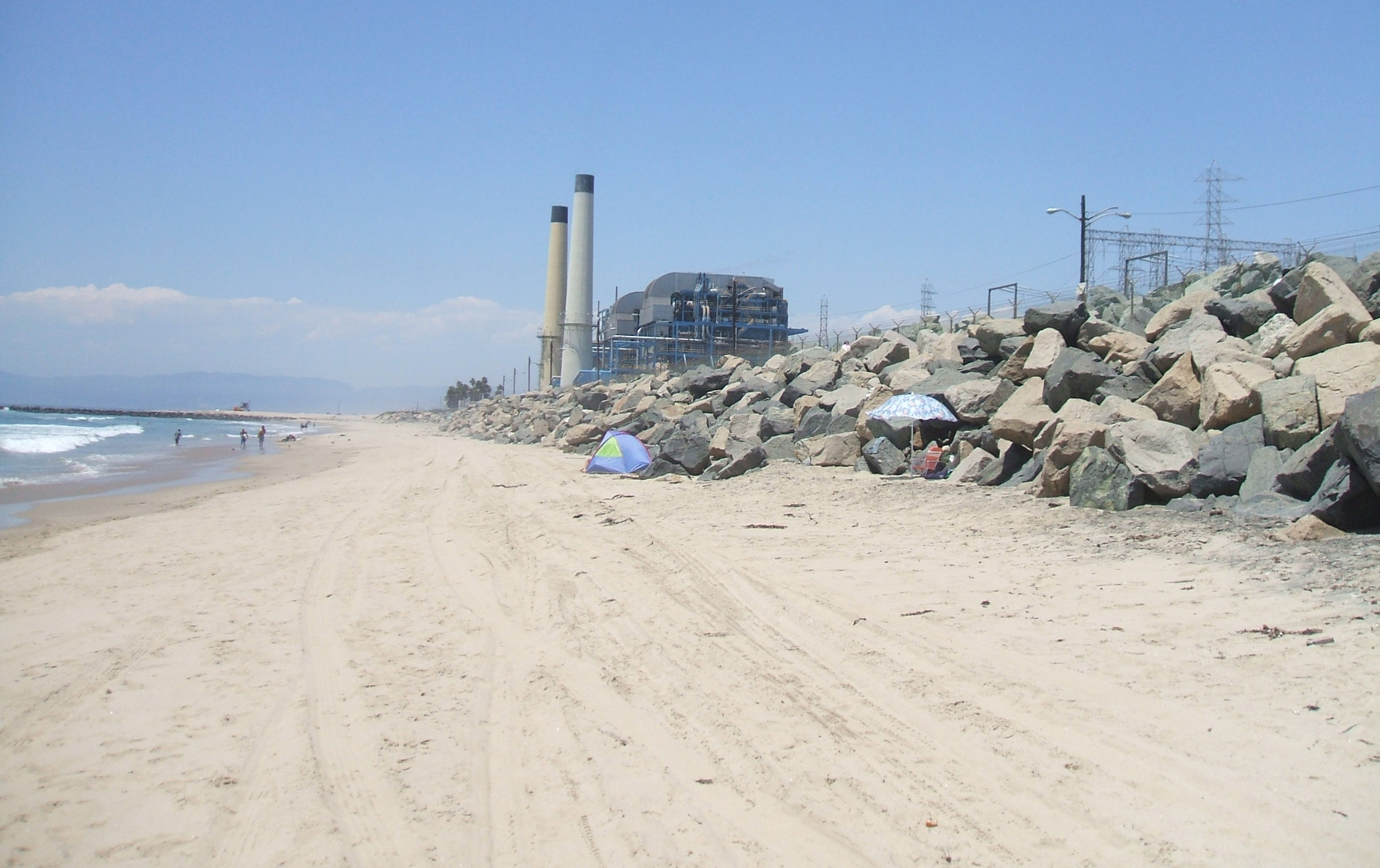
El Porto Beach, looking toward El Segundo.

El Porto Beach is a California public beach managed by the County of Los Angeles, located in Santa Monica Bay beside El Porto, which is now part of the City of Manhattan Beach, between the beaches of El Segundo Beach and Manhattan Beach, and is protected under the state park system. The entrance to El Porto's large parking lot, which has meters, is at the west end of 45th Street from Highland Avenue.

El Porto is one of the most popular beaches in the South Bay area with surfers from near and far because of an underwater canyon that creates waves usually larger than those at neighboring beaches. These swells have lefts and rights that break over sandbars and are consistently big when other beaches are flat. The breaks can hold waves up to double overhead.

El Porto is very close to the Chevron oil refinery and a private corporate electricity-producing facility for Edison that uses natural gas. Also very close are two City of Los Angeles industrial facilities, namely Hyperion sewage treatment plant and Scattergood Electricity Facility, which uses natural gas to produce the electricity.

Volleyball courts are located throughout the El Porto beach area. Roller skates and bicycles are rented out at the snack bar for recreation along the bike trail. There are restrooms with showers located throughout; and lifeguards are on duty. No fires are permitted on the beach; dogs are not allowed.

== See also ==
- List of beaches in California
- List of California state parks
