= Pacific Beach Club =

Unrealized resort in 1920s California

Coordinates: 33°38′45″N 117°59′4″W

Pacific Beach Club was a planned resort in Orange County, California for African Americans. The beachfront clubhouse, bathhouse, and pavilion were planned in 1925 and construction nearing completion the next year when the property burned down under mysterious circumstances. The resort was located outside Huntington Beach.

== Planning ==
The Pacific Beach Club was intended to be the "grandest of escapes" and to fulfill the dream of a resort where black people who were restricted from most of the California's beaches "could enjoy the sand and surf". Because of segregation black people in Los Angeles and Orange County were limited to the "Ink Well" in Santa Monica and Bruce's Beach in Manhattan Beach (until the property was seized in an eminent domain after protest from the growing white community surrounding it).

Board members for the resort included "a Who's Who of black business and civic leaders in Los Angeles at the time" including Joseph B. Bass, editor of the California Eagle; Frederick Roberts, the first black state legislator in California; and E. Burton Ceruti, a founder of the Los Angeles branch of the National Association for the Advancement of Colored People as well as a legal adviser to the group.

The isolated location for the club could be reached by driving the Pacific Coast Highway, "or riding the Pacific Electric railway from Los Angeles to Huntington Beach and walking a mile". Membership was initially advertised at $50 for an associate membership and $75 for a life membership. A white attorney from Los Angeles, Hal R. Clark, bought the land and leased it to the club.

== Rediscovery and contemporary accounts ==
Assistant archivist Chris Jepsen at the Orange County Archives (part of the clerk-recorder's office) and a Fresno State history professor, Daniel Cady, have been researching the property's history. Advertisements for the membership-only resort "promised a bathhouse serving 2,000 people, a clubhouse with "an atmosphere of ease and sociality", a recreational hall, an amusement zone "with all the concessions you will find on any beach" and more than 200 tent houses". "The California Eagle, a pioneering black-owned Los Angeles newspaper of the time", described it as "the beginning of the very foremost step of progress that the colored people have ever attempted", and its opening was scheduled for February 12, 1926, to mark Abraham Lincoln's birthday. On Labor Day in 1925, the uncompleted Pacific Beach Club hosted a "negro bathing beauty parade", as coined by the Los Angeles Times. The 6,000–10,000 person crowd was composed exclusively of the African American community and was the first "black only" event of this size in Southern California, and as historian Daniel Cady quotes, "believed by its sponsors to be the first in the country".

Details about the fire and how it started remain a mystery. Huntington Beach had one of the highest percentages of white Southern transplants in the 1920s because of its oil boom, and the area contained very few African Americans. One researcher believes the Ku Klux Klan, which was active in Huntington Beach (fielding two baseball teams) "torched the club".

Property deeds, newspaper descriptions and a researcher's "own forays to pace off the site", indicate the club's location was "southwest of the current entrance to the Cabrillo Mobile Home Park on Pacific Coast Highway, about midway between Beach Boulevard and Newland Street. A lifeguard station, parking lot and public restroom occupy the half-mile of beach today".

History professor Daniel Cady theorized that blacks were seeing the influx of white Southerners in Los Angeles and "naively considered less populated Orange County a more promising place". He noted, "They had no idea. The only place with a higher rate of white Southerners was the L.A. County jail. It's irony, irony, irony."

== Racial aspects ==
The club was opposed by chambers of commerce in Huntington Beach, Newport Beach and other cities, and "Huntington Beach tried to keep electricity and water from running to the club", while "right of way across the Pacific Electric and Southern Pacific railroad tracks was won only after an appeal to the state." Contractors were also changed on the project and "whether financial problems or something more sinister caused the interruptions is unclear".

The night watchman "whose initials appear in various newspapers as A.H., A.R. and A.K., said in a news account that ran two days after the fire that he recognized one of the men he saw running off", and the landowner was years later placed on probation for mail fraud over sales of fictitious titles to Wyoming oil claims in 1934. He was reimbursed "all but $20,000 of his loss" and The California Eagle "spearheaded a nationwide appeal in black newspapers for funds to build anew, but "by November 1926, the backers of the club gave up" and "Clark sold the property and paid back their investment".

== See also ==
- California Reparations Task Force
