= Bruce's Beach =

Beach park owned by and operated for African Americans in Manhattan Beach, California

Coordinates: 33°53′40″N 118°24′56″W

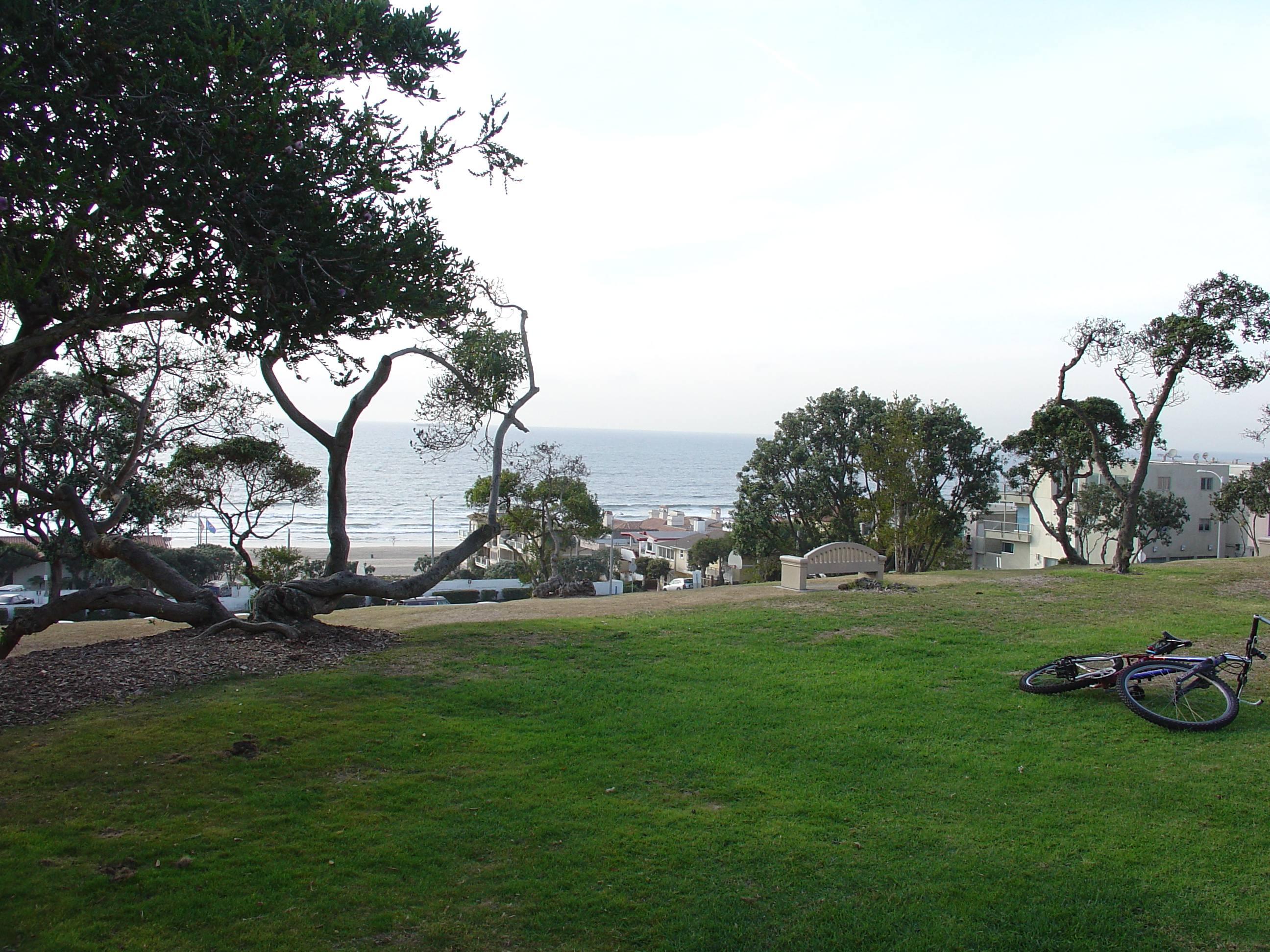
Winter view from the top of Bruce's Beach park (2009)

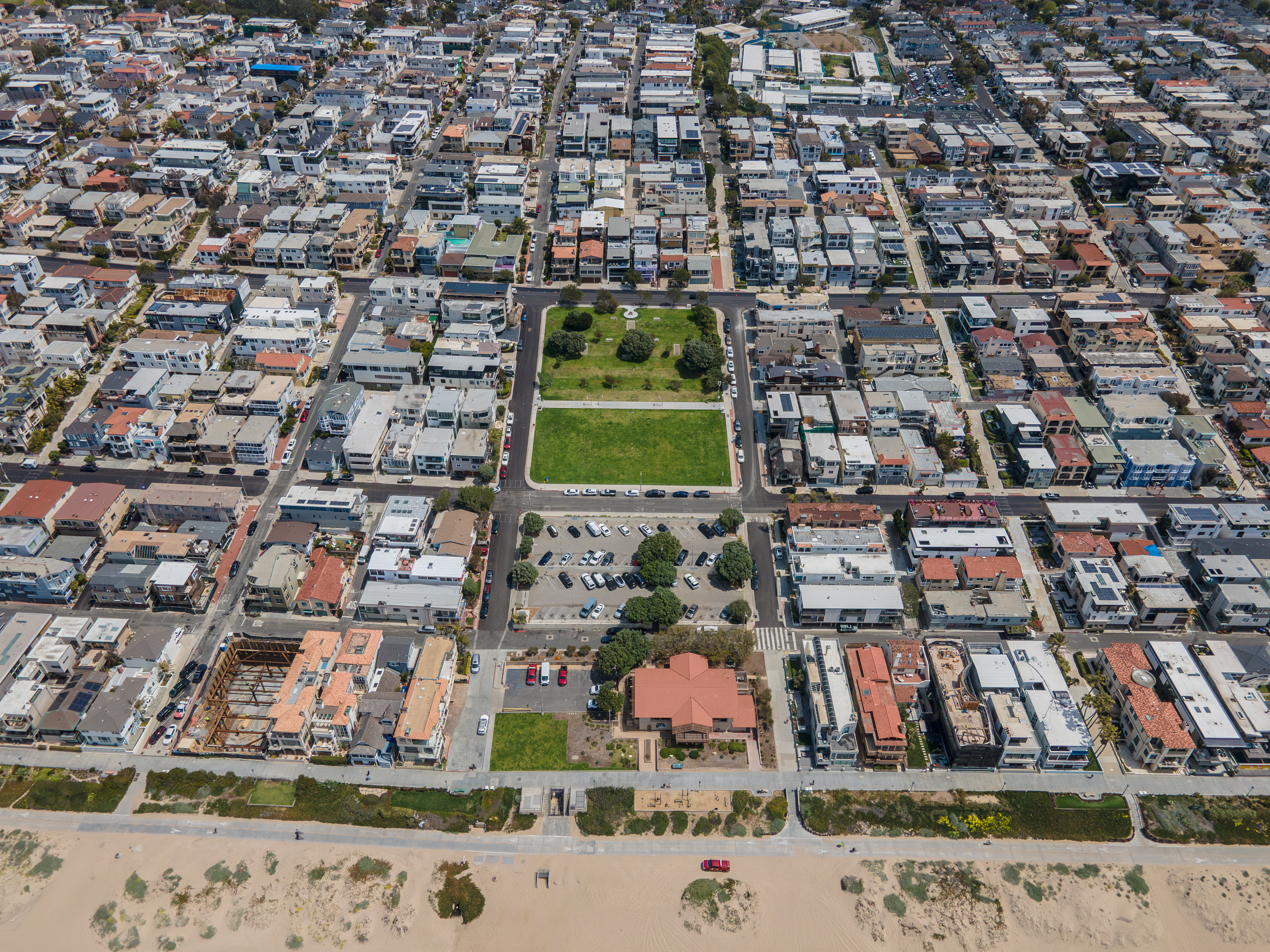
Bruce's Beach from the Sky (2023)

Bruce's Beach was an African-American beach resort at Manhattan Beach in Los Angeles County, California. The property, which was located at 26th Street and Highland Avenue, was owned and operated by Charles and Willa Bruce for the benefit of the black community when racial segregation prevented them from enjoying opportunities provided at other beaches in the area. After it opened in 1912, it became a successful and popular visitor destination for African Americans. In 1924 the city of Manhattan Beach council used eminent domain to close it down as the area proposed was to be redeveloped as a public park.

The property, acquired from the Bruce family and other owners, remained undeveloped for decades. Part of the site was eventually turned into a park in the 1960s and renamed Bruce's Beach in 2007. A lifeguard facility and parking lot were constructed on the beach parcels. In 2021, the Los Angeles County Board of Supervisors voted unanimously to approve returning the county land to the heirs of Charles and Willa Bruce. The complex process of transferring the parcels to their great-grandsons was completed in 2022. In January 2023 the Bruce family announced their decision to sell the beach back to the county for $20 million.

== Early history ==
Bruce's Beach is in the City of Manhattan Beach on Santa Monica Bay

Peck's Pier and Pavilion in Manhattan Beach was an area of recreation for African Americans. In 1912, Willa and Charles Bruce bought a property in the strand area for $1,225 from Los Angeles real estate broker Henry Willard. They established a resort and named it for Mrs. Bruce. On property right by the sand, they ran a popular lodge, cafe and dance hall. The development provided beach access to Black people, whose access to public shore was highly restricted. Other beach attractions available to African-Americans included Peck's Pier and pavilion on 34th Street, a section of Santa Monica State Beach referred to as the "Ink Well", and the Pacific Beach Club in Orange County.

Manhattan Beach was a predominantly white community and Mrs. Bruce's initiative "defiantly transgressed these racial boundaries". As Los Angeles's population increased and property values soared in the 1920s, Black people in the area suffered from increased racial tension, before eminent domain proceedings started by the city forced the club to close down.

While some historians credit George H. Peck (1856–1940), a wealthy developer and the founder of Manhattan Beach, for having "bucked" the practice of racial exclusion, Peck created barriers to direct Black out-of-town visitors to Bruce's Beach. To reach the ocean, visitors had to walk an extra half mile around property owned by Peck, who had lined it with security and “No Trespassing” signs.

Under the pretense of building a city park, the city of Manhattan Beach took control of the land from the Bruce family, and the buildings were razed in 1927. The city used eminent domain to acquire surrounding properties including some others that were black-owned. The couple sued for $120,000, which included $35,000 for each lot and $50,000 in damages. In 1929 they received a $14,500 settlement. Some of the property, including two of the Bruce family lots, were transferred to the state in 1948 for Manhattan State Beach. In the 1950s, city officials began to worry that family members might sue to regain their land unless it was used for the purpose for which it had been originally taken. In the 1960s, the property, which had been vacant for decades, was made into a city park first called Bayview Terrace Park, then Parque Culiacan. In 1995, the state transferred a portion of the land with the Bruce's parcels to Los Angeles County, with a condition that the county couldn’t transfer the property. The county then owned the entire block bordered by 26th and 27th streets, Manhattan Avenue and The Strand which was used for county lifeguard facilities and a parking lot.

== City park ==
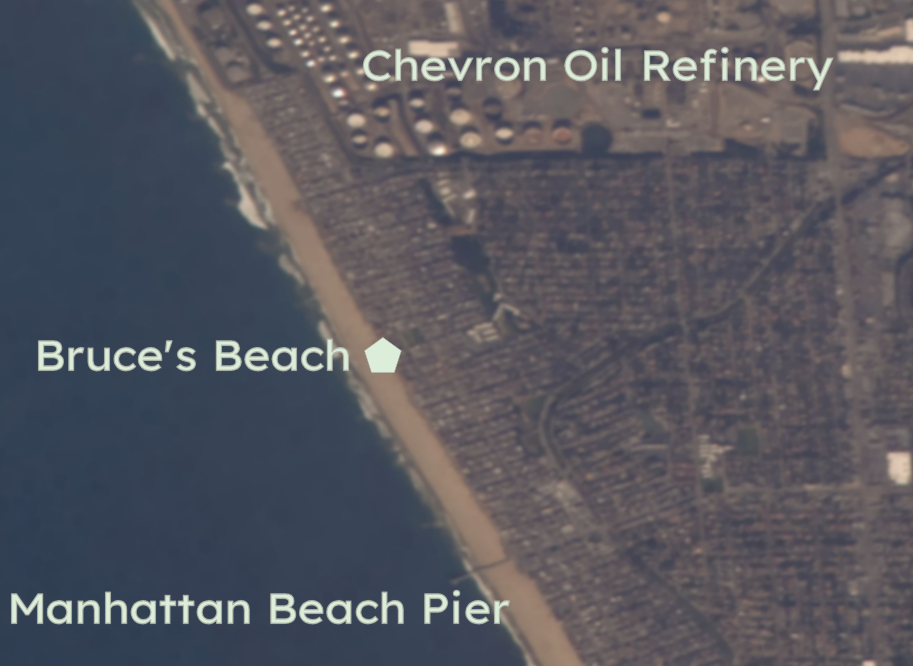
Bruce's Beach is north of Manhattan Beach Pier

In 2006 under the leadership of Manhattan Beach's Mayor Mitch Ward the city's first and only Black elected official, the Manhattan Beach City Council decided to rename the park, "commemorating our community's understanding that friendship, goodwill and respect for all begins within our own boundaries and extends to the world community. All are welcome." The city acknowledged its history of racial discrimination and in March 2007 the beach was ceremoniously renamed Bruce's Beach during an event exhibiting "a deep tide of goodwill."

The park is on a steep slope overlooking the ocean and includes rolling grassy terraces with benches and small trees. It is located above the County Lifeguard Station, between 26th and 27th Street, and runs west from Highland Avenue to Manhattan Avenue.

On June 19, 2020, a Juneteenth commemoration picnic was held at Bruce's Beach park. Kavon Ward, a Manhattan Beach resident, staged the event to draw attention to the seizure of the land by the city of Manhattan Beach. At the event, Ward told a reporter that her goal was to use policy to deed the land back to the Bruce family. In the weeks following, Ward founded the advocacy coalition Justice for Bruce's Beach. In August 2020, Justice for Bruce's Beach held a rally and march to further apply public pressure to return the land to the Bruce family.

The group's work pressured the city council in October 2020 to create the Bruce's Beach Task Force, which consisted of 13 members. The task force soon faced opposition from an anonymous group, "Concerned Residents of MB." The anonymous group paid for a two-page advertisement in The Beach Reporter, claiming the task force had used racism to "grab power."

The task force completed its work and delivered its report and recommendations to the city before the city disbanded the group in March 2021. The task force recommended that the city of Manhattan Beach issue a formal apology to the Bruce family. That recommendation met with resistance from some members of the city council, who expressed fears that an apology could lead to liability for the city. Councilmembers instead proposed three alternate versions to the wider-ranging apology proposed by the task force. The city council approved a statement "acknowledging, empathizing, and condemning the city's role in the racially motivated condemnation of properties in the area known as Bruce's Beach."

The city of Manhattan Beach also struggled with how to memorialize the former Bruce's Beach location. While a plaque acknowledging Willa and Charles Bruce had been placed at Bruce's Beach Park in 2006, the Bruce's Beach Task Force had called for the city's plaque language to be updated. The Bruce's Beach Task Force's History Advisory Board drafted language to be used on a new plaque, but the city council questioned various aspects of the wording on the plaque and, in July 2021, sent it back to the History Advisory Board for further revisions. This prompted one member of the History Advisory Board to resign in protest, citing the fact that the proposed plaque language was taken directly from the Bruce's Beach History Report that the city council had already approved.

The city council disbanded the Bruce's Beach History Advisory Board, opting to work on the plaque language itself. In March 2022, the city council approved language for the new plaque at the park that reads as follows:

"After being turned away from other coastal cities, Willa and Charles Bruce purchased property along the Strand in Manhattan Beach to create a beach resort for the area’s Black community on February 19, 1912. By 1916, the resort known as “Bruce’s Beach” was a thriving fixture for visiting Blacks, with a restaurant, dancehall, changing rooms, and showers.

"Soon after, several other Black families purchased property and built homes in the area where this park is now, including Major George Prioleau and Mrs. Ethel Prioleau, Elizabeth Patterson, Mary R. Sanders, Milton and Anna Johnson, John McCaskill and Elzia L. Irvin, and James and Lulu Slaughter.

"Unfortunately, not everyone in Manhattan Beach welcomed the Bruces’ enterprise and its crowds of Black patrons in that era of Jim Crow and racial segregation.

"The Bruces, their patrons, and the other Black property owners in the area faced harassment, intimidation, and discrimination by some, including City Hall. The purpose of these actions was to make Manhattan Beach inhospitable to Black residents and visitors.

"Enough White residents ultimately pressured the City Council to exercise its power of eminent domain to acquire the land for use as a public park. The City condemned the properties of the Bruces, Prioleaus, Johnsons, Patterson, and Sanders. Twenty-five White-owned properties that sat undeveloped among the Black-owned properties were condemned as well.

"The City’s action at the time was racially motivated and wrong. Today, the City acknowledges, empathizes, and condemns those past actions. We are not the Manhattan Beach of one hundred years ago. We reject racism, hate, intolerance, and exclusion.

"This park is named in memory of Bruce’s Beach and in recognition of Manhattan Beach’s next one hundred years as a city of respect and inclusion. A Juneteenth celebration in 2021 drew hundreds of celebrants to Bruce's Beach park. The Manhattan Beach City Council voted in March 2022 to reaffirm its existing policy not to allow special event permits at Bruce's Beach Park.

== Return to descendants of the Bruce family ==
The county process was launched in April 2021 by Janice Hahn, a Los Angeles County Board of Supervisors (LACBOS) member. Holly Mitchell, the Chair of Los Angeles County Chair and member of the LACBOS, who is also a member of the California Legislative Black Caucus, was the co-author of the motion which includes an option for the county to either purchase or lease the land from the Bruces. On April 20, 2021, LA County Supervisors voted unanimously to approve returning the county land where the LifeGuard Station was located to the family's descendants.

Due to a series of land transfers, a restriction required Los Angeles County to use Bruce's Beach for public recreation and prevented the county from transferring or selling the property. On June 2, 2021, the California State Senate approved a bill allowing the return of the property to descendants of the Bruces. Legislative approval by the state to eliminate that restriction was passed on September 9, 2021, and signed by Governor Gavin Newsom on September 30, 2021.

By May 2022, the (LACBOS) confirmed that Marcus and Derrick Bruce were the great-grandsons and legal heirs of Willa and Charles Bruce. The Los Angeles County Board of Supervisors voted unanimously on June 28, 2022, to return the two oceanfront parcels to the Bruce family.

On January 3, 2023, Los Angeles County officials confirmed that the Bruce family had decided to sell the land back to the county for $20 million.

== See also ==
- African American resorts
- American Beach, Florida
- Butler Beach in Florida
- Arundel on the Bay, Maryland
- California Reparations Task Force
- Val Verde, California
- List of Manhattan Beach municipal parks
