= List of Sydney Taylor Book Award recipients =

The Sydney Taylor Book Award, established in 1968, recognizes the best in Jewish children's literature. Medals are awarded annually for outstanding books that authentically portray the Jewish experience.

This list provides Sydney Taylor Book Award recipients, not including manuscript and body-of-work awards. The Children's Book Award was uncategorized from 1968 to 1980, after which two categories were presented: Younger Readers and Older Readers. In 1985, a Teen Reader category was introduced, though it has not been presented annually. In 2009 and 2010, an All Ages Award was also presented.

== Award categories ==
=== Uncategorized (1968–1980) ===
Award recipients
Year	Author	Book	Result	Ref.
1968	Esther Hautzig	The Endless Steppe	Winner	
1969	Shulamith Ish-Kishor	Our Eddie	Winner	
1970	Suzanne Lange	The Year	Winner	
1971	No Award Given			
1972	No Award Given			
1973	Yuri Suhl	Uncle Misha's Partisans	Winner	
1974	No Award Given			
1975	Marietta Moskin	Waiting for Mama	Winner	
1976	Milton Meltzer	Never to Forget	Winner	
1977	Anita Heyman	Exit from Home	Winner	
1978	Doris Orgel	The Devil in Vienna	Winner	
1979	Carol Snyder	Ike and Mama and the Block Wedding	Winner	
1980	Leonard Everett Fisher	A Russian Farewell	Winner	

=== Younger Reader / Picture Book (1981–present) ===
In 2020, the "Younger Reader" category was redefined as "Picture Book".

Award recipients
Year	Author	Illustrator	Book	Result	Ref.
1981	Barbara Cohen	Michael J. Deraney	Yussel's Prayer	Winner	
1982	Linda Heller	Linda Heller	The Castle on Hester Street	Winner	
1983	Barbara Pomerantz	Leon Lurie	Bubby, Me, and Memories	Winner	
1984	Amy Schwartz	Amy Schwartz	Mrs. Moskowitz and the Sabbath Candlesticks	Winner	
1985	Florence B. Freedman	Robert Andrew Parker	Brothers	Winner	
1985	Yaffa Ganz	Harvey Klineman	The Story of Mimmy and Simmy	Notable	
1985	Leon Garfield	Michael Bragg	The King in the Garden	Notable	
1985	Marilyn Hirsh	Marilyn Hirsh	I Love Passover	Notable	
1985	Ruth Schild Karlinsky	Ruth Schild Karlinsky	My First Book of Mitzvos	Notable	
1985	Riki Levinson	Diane Goode	Watch the Stars Come Out	Notable	
1985	Mildred Phillips	Margot Zemach	The Sign in Mendel's Window	Notable	
1985	Barbara Pomerantz	Donna Ruff	Who Will Lead the Kiddush?	Notable	
1985	Diana Herman Rosenfeld	Yoel Kenny	A Tree Full of Mitzvos	Notable	
1985	Diana Herman Rosenfeld	Leonid Pinchevsky and Eliyahu Meshchaninov	The Very Best Place for a Penny	Notable	
1985	Glen Rounds	Glen Rounds	Washday on Noah's Ark	Notable	
1985	Sheila Segal	Joel Iskowitz	Joshua's Dream	Notable	
1986	Marilyn Hirsh	Devis Grebu	Joseph Who Loved the Sabbath	Winner	
1986	Warwick Hutton	Warwick Hutton	Moses in the Bulrushes	Notable	
1986	Mindy Avra Portnoy	Steffi Karen Rubin	Ima on the Bima: My Mommy is a Rabbi	Notable	
1986	Pininnah Schramm	Jacqueline Kahane	The Big Sukkah	Notable	
1986	Amy Schwartz	Amy Schwartz	Yossel Zissel and the Wisdom of Chelm	Notable	
1987	David A. Adler	Rose Eichenbaum	The Number on My Grandfather's Arm	Winner	
1987	Judith Caseley	Judith Caseley	Apple Pie and Onions	Notable	
1987	Barbara Cohen	Anatoly Ivanov	Even Higher	Notable	
1987	Roberta Goldshlag Cooks	Susan Martz	Gittel and the Bell	Notable	
1987	Tomie dePaola	Tomie dePaola	Queen Esther	Notable	
1987	Richard Rosenblum	Richard Rosenblum	My Sister's Wedding	Notable	
1988	Patricia Polacco	Patricia Polacco	The Keeping Quilt	Winner	
1988	Yaffa Ganz	Harvey Klineman	From Head to Toe: A Book About You	Honor	
1988	Arthur Geisert	Arthur Geisert	The Ark	Honor	
1988	Jane Breskin Zalben	Jane Breskin Zalben	Beni's First Chanukah	Honor	
1988	Steven Bayer and Ilene Bayer	Marlene Lobell Ruthen and Joanne Strauss	Rachel and Mischa	Notable	
1988	Giora Carmi	Giora Carmi	And Shira Imagined	Notable	
1988	Barbara Cohen	Susan Jeanne Cohen	The Donkey's Story: A Bible Story	Notable	
1988	Ellie Gellman	Barbara Gellner	Justin's Hebrew Name	Notable	
1988	Barbara Diamond Goldin	Seymour Chwast	Just Enough Is Plenty: A Hanukkah Tale	Notable	
1989	Esther Silverstein Blanc	Tennessee Dixon	Berchick	Winner	
1989	Nancy Karkowsky	Shelly O. Haas	Grandma's Soup	Honor	
1989	Eric A. Kimmel	Trina Schart Hyman	Hershel and the Hanukkah Goblins	Honor	
1989	Richard Rosenbloom	Richard Rosenbloom	The Old Synagogue	Honor	
1989	David A. Adler	Joan Halpern	Malke's Secret Recipe: A Chanukah Story from Chelm	Notable	
1989	Amy Ehrlich	Ori Sherman	The Story of Hanukkah	Notable	
1989	Harriet Feder	Joan Halpern	Not Yet, Elijah	Notable	
1989	Florence Cassen Mayers		ABC: The Alef-Bet Book, The Israel Museum, Jerusalem	Notable	
1989	Mindy Avra Portnoy	Shelly O. Haas	Mommy Never Went to Hebrew School	Notable	
1989	Marilyn Singer	Ruth Rosner	Minnie's Yom Kippur Birthday	Notable	
1990	Eric A. Kimmel	Giora Carmi	The Chanukah Guest	Winner	
1990	Harriet Feder	Katherine Janus Kahn	Judah Who Always Said "No."	Honor	
1990	Barbara Diamond Goldin	Jeanette Winter	The World's Birthday: A Rosh Hashana Story	Honor	
1990	Phyllis Grode	Shelly O. Haas	Sophie's Name	Notable	
1990	Amy Hest	Amy Schwartz	Fancy Aunt Jess	Notable	
1990	Amy Hest	Deborah Haeffele	The Ring and the Window Seat	Notable	
1990	Fran Manushkin	Robin Spowart	Latkes and Applesauce	Notable	
1990	Ann Morris	Lilly Rivlin	When Will the Fighting Stop?: A Child's View of Jerusalem	Notable	
1990	Lillian Hammer Ross	Deborah Healy	The Little Old Man and His Dreams	Notable	
1990	Jane Breskin Zalben	Jane Breskin Zalben	Happy Passover, Rosie and Leo and Blossom's Sukkah	Notable	
1991	Sandy Lanton	Shelly O. Haas	Daddy's Chair	Winner	
1991	Barbara Diamond Goldin	Erika Weihs	Cakes and Miracles: A Purim Tale	Winner	
1991	Sholem Aleichem, selected and translated by Aliza Shevrin	Toby Gowing	Around the Table: Family Stories of Sholom Aleichem	Notable	
1991	Michelle Edwards	Michelle Edwards	A Baker's Portrait	Notable	
1991	Miriam Feinberg	Marlene L. Ruthen	Just Enough Room	Notable	
1991	Arthur A. Levine	James E. Ransome	All the Lights of the Night	Notable	
1991	Shulamith Levey Oppenheim	Joanna Yardley	Appleblossom	Notable	
1991	Gloria Teles Pushker	Judith Hierstein	Toby Belfer Never Had a Christmas Tree	Notable	
1991	Lillian Hammer Ross	Mary Morgan	Buba Leah and Her Paper Children	Notable	
1991	Margaret Wild	Julie Vivas	Let the Celebrations Begin!	Notable	
1992	Phoebe Gilman	Phoebe Gilman	Something from Nothing	Winner	
1992	Ellie Gellman	Judith Friedman	Jeremy's Dreidel	Honor	
1992	Esther Hautzig	Donna Diamond	Riches	Honor	
1992	Eric A. Kimmel	Leonard Everett Fisher	The Spotted Pony: A Collection of Hanukkah Stories	Honor	
1992	Richard Rosenblum	Richard Rosenblum	Journey to the Golden Land	Honor	
1992	Howard Schwartz and Barbara Rush	Stephen Fieser	The Sabbath Lion: A Jewish Folktale from Algeria	Honor	
1992	Colin T. Eisler	Jerry Pinkney	David's Songs: His Psalms and Their Story	Notable	
1992	Mira Jaffe	Louise August	In the Month of Kislev: A Story of Hanukkah	Notable	
1992	Patricia Polacco	Patricia Polacco	Mrs. Katz and Tush	Notable	
1992	Michael J. Rosen	Aminah Brenda Lynn Robinson	Elijah's Angel: A Story for Chanukah and Christmas	Notable	
1992	Sheila Segal	Joel Iskowitz	Joshua's Dream	Notable	
1993	Nina Jaffe	Elivia Savadier	The Uninvited Guest	Winner	
1993	Laurie Dolphin	Ben Dolphin	Neve Shalom Wahat Al-Salam: Oasis of Peace	Honor	
1993	David Techner and Judith Techner	Joel Iskowitz	A Candle for Grandpa	Honor	
1993	Miriam Aroner	Shelly O. Haas	The Kingdom of the Singing Birds	Notable	
1993	Aliana Brodmann	Anthony Carnabuci	The Gift	Notable	
1993	Michelle Edwards	Michelle Edwards	Blessed Are You	Notable	
1993	Leonard Everett Fisher	Leonard Everett Fisher	David and Goliath	Notable	
1993	Barbara Diamond Goldin	Robert Andrew Parker	The Magician's Visit	Notable	
1993	Carol Snyder	Beth Glick	God Must Like Cookies, Too	Notable	
1993	Tobi Tobias	Nola Langer Malone	Pot Luck	Notable	
1993	Sarah Waldman	Neil Waldman	Light: The First Seven Days	Notable	
1993	Wendy Wax (compiler)	John Speirs	Hanukkah, Oh Hanukkah	Notable	
1993	Nicki Weiss	Nicki Weiss	Stone Men	Notable	
1994	Sheldon Oberman	Ted Lewin	The Always Prayer Shawl	Winner	
1994	Maxine Schur	Brian Pinkney	Day of Delight: A Jewish Sabbath in Ethiopia	Honor	
1994	Diana Conway	Shelly O. Haas	Northern Lights: A Hanukkah Story	Notable	
1994	Arthur Geisert	Arthur Geisert	After the Flood	Notable	
1994	Patricia Lakin	Ted Rand	Don't Forget	Notable	
1994	Patricia Polacco	Patricia Polacco	Tikvah Means Hope	Notable	
1994	Mindy Avra Portnoy	Katherine Janus Kahn	Matzah Ball	Notable	
1994	Dalia Hardof Renberg, (adapter)	Ruth Heller	King Solomon and the Bee	Notable	
1995	Jo Hoestlandt	Johanna Kang	Star of Fear, Star of Hope	Winner	
1995	Janice Cohn	Bill Farnsworth	The Christmas Menorahs: How a Town Fought Hate	Honor	
1995	David A. Adler	Lloyd Bloom	One Yellow Daffodil	Notable	
1995	Feinberg Miriam	Karen Ostrove	A Yom Kippur Think	Notable	
1995	Barbara Diamond Goldin	Louise August	Night Lights: A Sukkot Story	Notable	
1995	Nechama Liss-Levinson	Nechama Liss-Levinson	When a Grandparent Dies	Notable	
1995	Sheila MacGill-Callahan	Stephen T. Johnson	When Solomon Was King	Notable	
1995	Fran Manushkin	Ned Bittinger	The Matzah That Papa Brought Home	Notable	
1995	Fran Manushkin	Jacqueline Chwast	Starlight and Candles	Notable	
1995	Steve Sanfield	Emily Lisker	Strudel, Strudel, Strudel	Notable	
1995	Steven Schnur	Stephen T. Johnson	The Tie Man's Miracle: A Chanukkah Tale	Notable	
1995	Roni Schotter	Marilyn Hafner	Passover Magic	Notable	
1995	Neil Waldman	Neil Waldman	The Golden City: Jerusalem's 3000 Years	Notable	
1996	Barbara Sofer		Shalom, Haver: Goodbye, Friend	Winner	
1996	Francine Prose	Mark Podwal	Dybbuk: A Story Made in Heaven	Honor	
1996	Howard Bogot	Norman Gorbaty	Becky and Benny Thank God	Notable	
1996	Sterna Citron	Igor Eydel	Hirsh's Secret: A Baal Shem Tov Story	Notable	
1996	Gary Clement	Gary Clement	Just Stay Put	Notable	
1996	Aubrey Davis	Dušan Petričić	Bone Button Borscht	Notable	
1996	Katherine Paterson	Alexander Koshkin	The Angel and the Donkey	Notable	
1996	Sheryl Prenzlau	Zely Smelkhov	The Jewish Children's Bible: Genesis	Notable	
1997	Elsa Okon Rael	Marjorie Priceman	When Zaydeh Danced on Eldridge Street	Winner	
1997	Amy Hest	P.J. Lynch	When Jessie Came Across the Sea	Honor	
1997	Cathy Goldberg Fishman	Melanie W. Hall	On Passover	Notable	
1997	Cathy Goldberg Fishman	Melanie W. Hall	On Rosh Hashanah and Yom Kippur	Notable	
1997	Mordicai Gerstein	Mordicai Gerstein	Jonah and the Two Great Fish	Notable	
1997	Linda Glaser	Nancy Cote	The Borrowed Hanukkah Latkes	Notable	
1997	Amy Hest	P.J. Lynch	When	Notable	
1997	Sue Kassirer	Danuta Jarecka	Joseph and His Coat of Many Colors	Notable	
1997	Sarah Marwil Lamstein	Cecily Lang	Annie's Shabbat	Notable	
1997	Kathryn Lasky	Kevin Hawkes	Marven of the Great North Woods	Notable	
1997	J. Patrick Lewis	Reg Cartwright	The Boat of Many Rooms	Notable	
1997	Claire Nivola	Claire Nivola	Elisabeth	Notable	
1997	Sheldon Oberman	Neil Waldman	By the Hanukkah Light	Notable	
1997	Francine Prose	Mark Podwal	The Angel's Mistake: Stories of Chelm	Notable	
1997	Roni Schotter	Marilyn Hafner	Purim Play	Notable	
1997	Dorrith M. Sim	Gerald Fitzgerald	In My Pocket	Notable	
1997	Neil Waldman	Neil Waldman	The Never-Ending Greenness	Notable	
1997	Neil Waldman	Neil Waldman	The Two Brothers: A Legend of Jerusalem	Notable	
1997	Brian Wildsmith	Brian Wildsmith	Joseph	Notable	
1997	Jane Breskin Zalben	Jane Breskin Zalben	Pearl's Marigolds for Grandpa	Notable	
1998	Marci Stillerman	Pesach Gerber	Nine Spoons	Winner	
1998	Rita Golden Gelman	Frane Lessac	Queen Esther Saves Her People	Honor	
1998	Francine Prose	Mark Podwal	You Never Know: A Legend of the Lamed-Vavniks	Honor	
1998	Jeffrey Schrier	Jeffrey Schrier	On the Wings of Eagles: An Ethiopian Boy's Story	Honor	
1998	Bruce Siegel	Shelly O. Haas	The Magic of Kol Nidre	Honor	
1998	S. Y. Agnon, translated by Robert Friend	Arieh Zeldich	Agnon's Alef Bet: Poems by S. Y. Agnon	Notable	
1998	Carol Bierman, with Barbara Hehner	Laurie McGaw	Journey to Ellis Island: How My Father Came to America	Notable	
1998	Nina Jaffe	Louise August	The Way Meat Loves Salt	Notable	
1998	Heinz Janisch, translated by Rosemary Lanning	Lisbeth Zwerger	Noah's Ark	Notable	
1998	Jacqueline Jules	Katherine Janus Kahn	Once Upon a Shabbos	Notable	
1998	William Kaplan, with Shelley Tanaka	Stephen Taylor	One More Border	Notable	
1998	Eric A. Kimmel	Barbara McClintock	When Mindy Saved Hanukkah	Notable	
1998	Fran Manushkin	Bob Dacey	Miriam's Cup	Notable	
1998	Mark Podwal	Mark Podwal	The Menorah Story	Notable	
1998	Joan Betty Stuchner	Richard Row	The Kugel Valley Klezmer Band	Notable	
1998	Nancy Sohn Swartz	Melanie W. Hall	In Our Image: God's First Creatures	Notable	
1998	Edith Tarbescu	Lydia Dabcovich	Annushka's Voyage	Notable	
1999	Maxine Rose Schur	Kimberley Bulcken Root	The Peddler's Gift	Winner	
1999	Mordicai Gerstein	Mordicai Gerstein	Noah and the Great Flood	Honor	
1999	Simms Taback	Simms Taback	Joseph Had a Little Overcoat	Honor	
1999	Susan Wilkowski	Judith Friedman	Baby's Bris	Honor	
1999	Joel Anderson	Abe Goolsby	David and the Trash-Talkin' Giant: Mr. Grungy's Seek and Find Bible Stories	Notable	
1999	Mordicai Gerstein	Mordicai Gerstein	Queen Esther, the Morning Star	Notable	
1999	Charlotte Herman	Katya Krenina	How Yussel Caught the Gefilte Fish: A Shabbos Story	Notable	
1999	Ziporah Hildebrandt	Robin Roraback	This Is Our Seder	Notable	
1999	Shirley Hughes	Shirley Hughes	The Lion and the Unicorn	Notable	
1999	Miriam Nerlove	Miriam Nerlove	The Ten Commandments for Jewish Children	Notable	
1999	Joanne Rocklin	Catherine O'Neil	The Very Best Hanukkah Gift	Notable	
1999	Joan Rothenberg	Joan Rothenberg	Matzah Ball Soup	Notable	
1999	Sandy Sasso	Karyn Kunz Finney	For Heaven's Sake	Notable	
1999	Erica Silverman	Susan Gaber	Raisel's Riddle	Notable	
1999	Rosemary Wells	Dann Adreasen	Streets of Gold	Notable	
1999	Elie Wiesel	Mark Podwal	King Solomon and His Magic Ring	Notable	
1999	Elvira Woodruff	Michael Dooling	The Memory Coat	Notable	
2000	Eric A. Kimmel	Jon J. Muth	Gershon's Monster: A Story for the Jewish New Year	Winner	
2000	Cary Fagan	Regolo Ricci	The Market Wedding	Honor	
2000	Sheldon Oberman	Neil Waldman	The Wisdom Bird: A Tale of Solomon and Sheba	Honor	
2000	Linda Jacobs Altman	Cornelius Van Wright and Ting-Hwa Hu	The Legend of Freedom Hill	Notable	
2000	Cathy Goldberg Fishman	Melanie W. Hall	On Purim	Notable	
2000	Leslie Kimmelman	Ora Eitan	Dance, Sing, Remember	Notable	
2000	Fran Manushkin	Rosalind Charney Kaye	Come, Let Us Be Joyful: The Story of Hava Nagila	Notable	
2000	Laura Kraus Melmed	David Slonim	Moishe's Miracle	Notable	
2000	Leah Shollar	Shoshana Mekibel	Thread of Kindness: A Tzedaka Story	Notable	
2001	Elsa Okon Rael	Maryann Kovalski	Rivka's First Thanksgiving	Winner	
2001	Sue Alexander	Leonid Gore	Behold the Trees	Notable	
2001	Matt Biers-Ariel	Esti Silverberg-Kiss	Solomon and the Trees	Notable	
2001	Mira Pollak Brichto	Selina Alko	The God around Us, Volume 2: The Valley of Blessings	Notable	
2001	Chaya Burstein	Judy Hanks-Henn	Hanukkah Cat (Revised Edition)	Notable	
2001	Deborah da Costa	Cornelius Van Wright and Ying-Hwa Hu	Snow in Jerusalem	Notable	
2001	Renate Dollinger	Renate Dollinger	The Rabbi Who Flew	Notable	
2001	Cathy Goldberg Fishman	Melanie W. Hall	On Shabbat	Notable	
2001	Barbara Diamond Goldin	Anik McGrory	A Mountain of Blintzes	Notable	
2001	Amy Hest	Claire Nivola	The Friday Nights of Nana	Notable	
2001	Jacqueline Jules	Katherine Janus Kahn	The Hardest Word: A Yom Kippur Story	Notable	
2001	Eric A. Kimmel	Jon Goodell	Zigazak! A Magical Hanukkah Night	Notable	
2001	Sandy Sasso	Joani Keller Rothenberg	Cain and Abel: Finding the Fruits of Peace	Notable	
2001	Lesley Simpson	Nicole in den Bosch	The Shabbat Box	Notable	
2001	Myron Uhlberg	Sonja Lamut	Lemuel, the Fool	Notable	
2001	Richard Ungar		Rachel Captures the Moon	Notable	
2002	Esther Hershenhorn	Roseanne Litzinger	Chicken Soup by Heart	Winner	
2002	Jerry Pinkney	Jerry Pinkney	Noah's Ark	Honor	
2002	Sylvia Rouss	Katherine Janus Kahn	Sammy Spider's First Trip to Israel: A Book about the Five Senses	Honor	
2002	Jane Breskin Zalben	Jane Breskin Zalben	Pearl's Passover: A Family Celebration through Stories, Recipes, Crafts, And Songs	Honor	
2002	Barbara Diamond Goldin	Laura Sucher	Night Lights: A Sukkot Story	Notable	
2002	Rhonda Gowler Greene	Anne Wilson	The Beautiful World That God Made	Notable	
2002	Naomi Howland	Naomi Howland	Matzah Man	Notable	
2002	Latifa Berry Kropf	Tod Rosen	It's Challah Time!	Notable	
2002	Karla Kuskin	Michael Grejniec	The Animals and the Ark	Notable	
2002	Lesléa Newman	Krysten Brooker	Runaway Dreidel	Notable	
2002	Tony Kushner	Maurice Sendak	Brundibar	Notable	
2002	Rochel Groner Vorst	Elizabeth Victor-Elsby	The Sukkah That I Built	Notable	
2002	Anne Wilson	Anne Wilson	Noah's Ark	Notable	
2003	Aubrey Davis	Dušan Petričić	Bagels from Benny	Winner	
2003	Jenny Koralek	Pauline Baynes	The Moses Basket	Honor	
2003	Burt E. Schuman	Rosalind Charney Kaye	Chanukah on the Prairie	Honor	
2003	Erica Silverman	Matthew Trueman	When the Chickens Went on Strike: A Rosh Hashanah Tale	Honor	
2003	Julie Baer	Julie Baer	I Only Like What I Like	Honor	
2003	Esther Silverstein Blanc and Godeane Eagle	Tennessee Dixon	Long Johns for a Small Chicken	Honor	
2003	Margie Blumberg	Laurie McGaw	Avram's Gift	Honor	
2003	Mark Podwal	Mark Podwal	A Sweet Year: A Taste of the Jewish Holidays	Honor	
2003	Dina Rosenfeld	Tova Leff	Five Alive! My Yom Tov Five Senses	Honor	
2003	Sylvia Rouss	Nancy Oppenheimer	Tali's Jerusalem Scrapbook	Honor	
2003	Pete Seeger	Wendy Anderson Halperin	Turn, Turn, Turn	Honor	
2003	Emily Sper	Emily Sper	The Passover Seder	Honor	
2003	Stephanie Spinner	Jill McElmurry	It's a Miracle! A Hanukkah Storybook	Honor	
2003	Ann Redisch Stampler	Jacqueline M. Cohen	Something for Nothing	Honor	
2003	Richard Ungar	Richard Ungar	Rachel's Gift	Honor	
2004	Jean Marzollo	Jean Marzollo	Daniel in the Lions’ Den	Honor	
2004	Leone Adelson	Naomi Howland	The Mystery Bear: A Purim Story	Notable	
2004	Michelle Edwards	Stacey Schuett	Papa's Latkes	Notable	
2004	Linda Glaser	Nancy Cote	Mrs. Greenberg's Messy Hanukkah	Notable	
2004	Lawrence A. Hoffman and Ron Wolfson	Bill Aron	What You Will See Inside a Synagogue	Notable	
2004	Jenny Koralek	Pauline Baynes	The Coat of Many Colors	Notable	
2004	Latifa Berry Kropf	Tod Cohen	It's Sukkah Time!	Notable	
2004	Jean Marzollo	Jean Marzollo	David and Goliath	Notable	
2004	Jean Marzollo	Jean Marzollo	Jonah and the Whale (and the Worm)	Notable	
2004	Jean Marzollo	Jean Marzollo	Miriam and Her Brother Moses	Notable	
2004	Rahel Musleah	Judy Jarrett	Apples and Pomegranates: A Family Seder for Rosh Hashanah	Notable	
2004	Mindy Avra Portnoy	Shelly O. Haas	Where Do People Go When They Die?	Notable	
2005	Dating system changed this year to reflect year in which award is announced instead of year of publication.				
2006	Erica Silverman	Mordicai Gerstein	Sholom Treasure: How Sholom Aleichem Became a Writer	Winner	
2006	Louise Borden	Allan Drummond	The Journey that Saved Curious George: The True Wartime Escape of Margret and H.A. Rey	Honor	
2006	Jean Marzollo	Jean Marzollo	Ruth and Naomi: A Bible Story	Honor	
2006	Anna Olswanger	Paula Goodman Koz	Shlemiel Crooks	Honor	
2006	Simms Taback	Simms Taback	Kibitzers and Fools: Tales My Zayda Told Me	Honor	
2006	Julie Baer	Julie Baer	Love Me Later	Notable	
2006	Esme Raji Codell	LeUyen Pham	Hanukkah, Shmanukkah!	Notable	
2006	Deborah Bodin Cohen	Melanie W. Hall	Seventh Day: A Shabbat Story	Notable	
2006	Laurie Jacobs	Shelly Ephraim	A Box of Candles	Notable	
2006	Latifa Berry Kropf	Tod Cohen	It's Purim Time!	Notable	
2006	Lawrence Kushner and Gary D. Schmidt	Matthew J. Baek	In God's Hands	Notable	
2006	Michelle Markel	Emily Lisker	Dreamer from the Village: The Story of Marc Chagall	Notable	
2006	Mark Podwal	Mark Podwal	Jerusalem Sky: Stars, Crosses, and Crescents	Notable	
2006	Matthew Reinhart	Matthew Reinhart	The Ark	Notable	
2006	Howard Schwartz	Kristina Swarner	Before You Were Born	Notable	
2006	Lisa Shulman	Rosanne Litzinger	The Matzoh Ball Boy	Notable	
2006	Edie Stoltz Zolkower	Edie Stoltz Zolkower	It's Tu B'Shevat	Notable	
2007	Stephen Krensky	Greg Harlin	Hanukkah at Valley Forge	Winner	
2007	Mordicai Gerstein	Mordicai Gerstein	The White Ram: A Story of Abraham and Isaac	Honor	
2007	Bimba Landmann	Bimba Landmann	I Am Marc Chagall	Honor	
2007	Ann Redisch Stampler	Jacqueline M. Cohen	Shlemazel and the Remarkable Spoon of Pohost	Honor	
2007	Brynn Olenberg Sugarman	Michelle Shapiro	Rebecca's Journey Home	Honor	
2007	Maxie Baum	Julie Paschkis	I Have a Little Dreidel	Notable	
2007	Anna Harwell Celenza	JoAnn E. Kitchel	Gershwin's Rhapsody in Blue	Notable	
2007	Brian P. Cleary	David Udovic	Eight Wild Nights: A Family Hanukkah Tale	Notable	
2007	Cathy Goldberg Fishman	Melanie W. Hall	On Sukkot and Simchat Torah	Notable	
2007	Julie K. Gordon, editor		With All Your Heart: A Shabbat and Festival Companion	Notable	
2007	Deborah Heiligman		Celebrate Hanukkah with Light, Lakes and Dreidels	Notable	
2007	Chaim Kosofsky	Jessica Schiffman	Much, Much Better	Notable	
2007	Latifa Berry Kropf	Tod Cohen	It's Shofar Time!	Notable	
2007	Amy Littlesugar	William Low	Willy & Max: A Holocaust Story	Notable	
2007	Yona Zeldis McDonough	Malcah Zeldis	Hammerin' Hank: The Life of Hank Greenberg	Notable	
2007	Richard Michelson	E. B. Lewis	Across the Alley	Notable	
2007	Andria Warmflash Rosenbaum	Barb Bjornson	A Grandma Like Yours/A Grandpa Like Yours	Notable	
2007	Jessica Souhami	Jessica Souhami	The Little, Little House	Notable	
2008	Sarah Gershman	Kristina Swarner	The Bedtime Sh’ma	Winner	
2008	Linda Heller	Boris Kulikov	The Castle on Hester Street	Honor	
2008	Sarah Marwil Lamstein	Neil Waldman	Letter on the Wind: A Chanukah Tale	Honor	
2008	Jane Breskin Zalben	Jane Breskin Zalben	Light	Honor	
2008	Michelle Shapiro Abraham	Ann D. Koffsky	My Cousin Tamar Lives in Israel	Notable	
2008	Sharon Reiss Baker	Beth Peck	A Nickel, a Trolley, a Treasure House	Notable	
2008	Joan Benjamin-Farren		Shuli and Me: From Slavery to Freedom	Notable	
2008	Deborah Bodin Cohen	Jane Dippold	Papa Jethro	Notable	
2008	Deborah da Costa	Gosia Mosz	Hanukkah Moon	Notable	
2008	Deborah Heiligman		Celebrate Passover with Matzah, Maror and Memories	Notable	
2008	Deborah Heiligman		Celebrate Rosh Hashanah & Yom Kippur with Honey, Prayers, and the Shofar	Notable	
2008	Dave Horowitz	Dave Horowitz	Five Little Gefiltes	Notable	
2008	Heidi Smith Hyde	Johanna Van Der Sterre	Mendel's Accordion	Notable	
2008	Jacqueline Jules	Natascia Ugliano	Abraham's Search for God	Notable	
2008	Amy Meltzer	Janice Fried	A Mezuzah on the Door	Notable	
2008	Susan Remick Topek	Tod Cohen	Ten Good Rules: A Counting Book	Notable	
2009	Richard Michelson	Raúl Colón	As Good As Anybody: Martin Luther King, Jr. and Abraham Joshua Heschel's Amazing March Toward Freedom	Winner	
2009	Deborah Bodin Cohen	Shahar Kober	Engineer Ari and the Rosh Hashanah Ride	Honor	
2009	Jacqueline Jules	Natascia Ugliano	Sarah Laughs	Honor	
2009	Richard Michelson	Ron Mazellan	A is for Abraham: A Jewish Family Alphabet	Honor	
2009	Jane Yolen	Jim Burke	Naming Liberty	Honor	
2009	Eric A. Kimmel	Katya Krenina	Mysterious Guests: A Sukkot Story	Notable	
2009	Anna Levine	Knesia Topaz	Jodie's Hanukkah Dig	Notable	
2009	Allison Ofanansky	Eliyahu Alpern	Harvest of Light	Notable	
2009	Sylvia Rouss	Katherine Janus Kahn	Sammy Spider's First Shavuot	Notable	
2009	Elisheva Schreiber, translated by Sherie Gross	Batsheva Ravad	My Tzitzis Book	Notable	
2009	Harriet Ziefert	Karla Gudeon	Hanukkah Haiku	Notable	
2010	April Halprin Wayland	Stéphane Jorisch	New Year at the Pier	Winner	
2010	Deborah Bodin Cohen	Jago	Nachshon, Who Was Afraid to Swim: A Passover Story	Honor	
2010	Jacqueline Jules	Natascia Ugliano	Benjamin and the Silver Goblet	Honor	
2010	Elka Weber	Adam Gustavson	Yankee at the Seder	Honor	
2010	Jonah Winter	André Carrilho	You Never Heard of Sandy Koufax?	Honor	
2010	Michelle Shapiro Abraham	Janice Fried	Where Is Grandpa Dennis?	Notable	
2010	Seryl Berman	Ari Binus	Around the Shabbos Table	Notable	
2010	Jacqueline Dembar Greene	Douglas Chyka	The Secret Shofar of Barcelona	Notable	
2010	Esther Susan Heller	David Ginsberg	Menorah Under the Sea	Notable	
2010	Linda Heller	Allison Jay	Today Is the Birthday of the World	Notable	
2010	Leah Braunstein Levy	Avi Katz	The Waiting Wall	Notable	
2010	Allison Ofanasky	Eliyahu Alpern	Sukkot Treasure Hunt	Notable	
2010	Barbara Reid	Barbara Reid	Fox Walked Alone	Notable	
2011	Howard Schwartz	Kristina Swarner	Gathering Sparks	Winner	
2011	Sarah Gershman	Kristina Swarner	Modeh Ani: A Good Morning Book	Honor	
2011	Linda Glaser	Claire Nivola	Emma's Poem: The Voice of the Statue of Liberty	Honor	
2011	Barbara Diamond Goldin	Jaime Zollars	Cakes and Miracles: A Purim Tale	Honor	
2011	Deborah Bodin Cohen	Shahar Kober	Engineer Air and the Sukkah Express	Notable	
2011	Heidi Smith Hyde	Johanna van der Sterre	Feivel's Flying Horses	Notable	
2011	Jacqueline Jules	Natascia Ugliano	Miriam in the Desert	Notable	
2011	Leslie Kimmelman	Paul Meisel	The Little Red Hen and the Passover Matzah	Notable	
2011	Deborah Lakritz	Martha Aviles	Say Hello, Lily	Notable	
2011	Daniel Pinkwater	Jill Pinkwater	Beautiful Yetta, the Yiddish Chicken	Notable	
2011	Mindy Avra Portnoy	Valeria Cis	A Tale of Two Seders	Notable	
2011	Sharon Robinson	E. B. Lewis	Jackie's Gift	Notable	
2011	Robert Rubenstein	Woody Miller	Zishe the Strong Man	Notable	
2011	Rebeka Simhaee	Michael Weber	Sara Finds a Mitzva	Notable	
2011	Laurel Snyder	David Goldin	Baxter, the Pig Who Wanted to be Kosher	Notable	
2011	Ann Redisch Stampler	Eugene Yelchin	The Rooster Prince of Breslov	Notable	
2011	Doba Rivka Weber	Phyllis Saroff	Dear Tree	Notable	
2012	Michael J. Rosen	Robert Sabuda	Chanukah Lights	Winner	
2012	Susan Campbell Bartoletti	Holly Meade	Naamah and the Ark at Night	Honor	
2012	Durga Yael Bernhard	Durga Yael Bernhard	Around the World in One Shabbat	Honor	
2012	Jacqueline Jules	Debbi Melmon	Picnic at Camp Shalom	Notable	
2012	Eric A. Kimmel	Aaron Jansinski	The Golem's Latkes	Notable	
2012	Eric A. Kimmel	Martina Peluso	Joseph and the Sabbath Fish	Notable	
2012	Jamie Korngold	Julie Fortenberry	Sadie's Sukkah Breakfast	Notable	
2012	Amy Meltzer	Martha Aviles	The Shabbat Princess	Notable	
2012	Richard Michelson	Zachary Pullen	Lipman Pike: America's First Home Run King	Notable	
2012	Barb Rosenstock	Melanie Hall	The Littlest Mountain	Notable	
2012	Marisabina Russo	Marisabina Russo	I Will Come Back to You: A Family in Hiding during World War II	Notable	
2012	Gloria Spielman	Manon Gauthier	Marcel Marceau: Master of Mime	Notable	
2012	Elka Weber	Elisa Kleven	One Little Chicken	Notable	
2013	Linda Glaser	Adam Gustavson	Hannah's Way	Winner	
2013	Sheri Sinykin	Kristina Swarner	Zayde Comes to Live	Honor	
2013	Linda Leopold Strauss	Alexi Natchev	The Elijah Door: A Passover Tale	Honor	
2014	Laurel Snyder	Catia Chen	The Longest Night	Winner	
2014	Betty Rosenberg Perlov	Cosei Kawa	Rifka Takes a Bow	Honor	
2014	Renee Londner	Martha Avilés	Stones for Grandpa	Honor	
2015	Jim Aylesworth	Barbara McClintock	My Grandfather's Coat	Winner	
2015	Barbara Krasner	Kelsey Garrity-Rile	Goldie Takes a Stand	Honor	
2015	Jacqueline Jules	Durga Yael Bernhard	Never Say a Mean Word Again: A Tale from Medieval Spain	Honor	
2016	Lesléa Newman	Amy June Bates	Ketzel, the Cat who Composed	Winner	
2016	Heidi Smith Hyde	Jing Jing Tsong	Shanghai Sukkah	Honor	
2016	Leslie Kimmelman	Talitha Shipman	Everybody Says Shalom	Honor	
2016	David A. Adler	Jeffrey Ebbeler	Hanukkah Cookies with Sprinkles	Notable	
2016	Jamie Korngold	Julie Fortenberry	Sadie and Ori and the Blue Blanket	Notable	
2016	Isaac Bashevis Singer	Suzanne Raphael Berkson	The Parakeet Named Dreidel	Notable	
2017	Debbie Levy	Elizabeth Baddeley	I Dissent: Ruth Bader Ginsburg Makes Her Mark	Winner	
2017	Michelle Edwards	G. Brian Karas	A Hat for Mrs. Goldman: A Story About Knitting and Love	Honor	
2017	Richard Michelson	Edel Rodriguez	Fascinating: The Life of Leonard Nimoy	Honor	
2017	Barbara Bietz	John Kanzler	The Sundown Kid: A Southwestern Shabbat	Notable	
2017	Linda Glaser	Nuria Balaguer	On One Foot	Notable	
2017	Jeff Gottesfeld	Peter McCarty	The Tree in the Courtyard: Looking Through Anne Frank's Window	Notable	
2017	Eric A. Kimmel	Maria Surducan	Gabriel's Horn	Notable	
2017	Pamela Mayer	Deborah Melmon	Chicken Soup, Chicken Soup	Notable	
2017	Jessica Steinberg	Amanda Pike	Not This Turkey!	Notable	
2018	Richard Michelson	Karla Gudeon	The Language of Angels: A Story About the Reinvention of Hebrew	Winner	
2018	Fawzia Gilani-Williams	Chiara Fedele	Yaffa and Fatima: Shalom, Salaam	Honor	
2018	Jacqueline Jules	Yevgenia Nayberg	Drop by Drop: A Story of Rabbi Akiva	Honor	
2018	David A. Adler	Andre Ceolin	Yom Kippur Shortstop	Notable	
2018	Michael Herman	Alida Massari	Under the Sabbath Lamp	Notable	
2018	Eric A. Kimmel	Jim Starr	Big Sam: A Rosh Hashanah Tall Tale	Notable	
2018	Joanne Oppenheim	Jon Davis	The Knish War on Rivington Street	Notable	
2018	Jonah Winter	Stacy Innerst	Ruth Bader Ginsburg: The Case of R.B.G. vs. Inequality	Notable	
2019	Emily Jenkins	Paul O. Zelinsky	All-of-a-Kind Family Hanukkah	Winner	
2019	Barb Rosenstock	Mary GrandPré	Through the Window: Views of Marc Chagall's Life	Honor	
2019	Jane Breskin Zalben	Mehrdokht Amini	A Moon for Moe and Mo	Honor	
2019	Nancy Churnin	James Rey Sanchez	Irving Berlin: The Immigrant Boy Who Made America Sing	Notable	
2019	Leslie Kimmelman	David C. Gardner	Write On, Irving Berlin!	Notable	
2019	Gloria Spielman	Inbal Gigi Bousidan	French Toast Sundays	Notable	
2019	Evelyn Zusman	Kyrsten Brooker	The Passover Parrot	Notable	
2020	Sue Macy	Stacy Innerst	The Book Rescuer	Winner	
2020	Lesléa Newman	Amy June Bates	Gittel's Journey	Honor	
2020	Debbie Levy	Sonja Wimmer	The Key from Spain: Flory Jagoda and Her Music	Honor	
2020	Deborah Blumenthal	Masha D’yans	Parrots, Pugs and Pixie Dust: A Book about Fashion Designer Judith Leiber	Notable	
2020	Ann Malaspina	Merrilee Liddiard	A Scarf for Keiko	Notable	
2020	Mara Rockliff	Zosia Dzierzawska	Doctor Esperanto and the Language of Hope	Notable	
2021	Lesléa Newman	Susan Gal	Welcoming Elijah: a Passover Tale with a Tail	Winner	
2021	Mychal Copeland	André Ceolin	I Am the Tree of Life: My Jewish Yoga Book	Honor	
2021	Jane Yolen	Khoa Le	Miriam at the River	Honor	
2021	Leslie Kimmelman	Galia Bernstein	The Eight Knights of Hanukkah	Notable	
2021	Linda Elovitz Marshall	Lisa Anchin	The Polio Pioneer: Dr. Jonas Salk and the Polio Vaccine	Notable	
2021	Erica S. Perl	Shahar Kober	The Ninth Night of Hanukkah	Notable	
2022	Susan Kusel	Sean Rubin	The Passover Guest	Winner	
2022	Peter Sís	Peter Sís	Nicky & Vera: A Quiet Hero of the Holocaust and the Children He Rescued	Honor	
2022	Nancy Churnin	Bethany Stancliffe	Dear Mr. Dickens	Honor	
2022	Jeff Gottesfeld	Michelle Laurentia Agatha	The Christmas Mitzvah	Honor	
2022	Nancy Churnin	Yevgenia Nayberg	A Queen to the Rescue: The Story of Henrietta Szold, Founder of Hadassah	Notable	
2022	Cynthia Levinson	Evan Turk	The People's Painter: How Ben Shahn Fought for Justice with Art	Notable	
2022	Lee Wind	Paul O. Zelinsky	Red and Green and Blue and White	Notable	
2023	Chana Stiefel	Susan Gal	The Tower of Life: How Yaffa Eliach Rebuilt Her Town in Stories and Photographs	Winner	
2023	Paula Cohen	Paula Cohen	Big Dreams, Small Fish	Honor	
2023	Shoshana Nambi	Moran Yogev	The Very Best Sukkah: A Story from Uganda	Honor	
2023	Erin Silver	Michelle Theodore	Sitting Shiva	Honor	
2023	Ruth Behar	Devon Holzwarth	Tia Fortuna's New Home: A Jewish Cuban Journey	Notable	
2023	Susan Goldman Rubin	Sarah Dvojack	Madame Alexander: The Creator of the Iconic American Doll	Notable	
2023	Sarah Sassoon	Noa Kelner	Shoham's Bangle	Notable	
2023	Joel Edward Stein	Sara Ugolotti	Raquela's Seder	Notable	
2024	Richard Ho	Lynn Scurfield	Two New Years	Winner	
2024	Tziporah Cohen	Yaara Eshet	Afikomen	Honor	
2024	Elissa Brent Weissman	Omer Hoffmann	Hanukkah Upside Down	Honor	
2024	Elisa Boxer	Amy June Bates	Hidden Hope: How a Toy and a Hero Saved Lives During the Holocaust	Honor	
2024	Susan Tarcov	Diana Renjina	The Rabbi and His Donkey	Notable	
2024	Erica Lyons	Renia Metallinou	Zhen Yu and the Snake	Notable	
2024	Laurel Snyder		The Witch of Woodland	Notable	
2025	Deborah Bodin Cohen and Kerry Olitzky	Stacey Dressen McQueen	An Etrog from Across the Sea	Winner	
2025	Norman H. Finkelstein	Vesper Stamper	Amazing Abe: How Abraham Cahan's Newspaper Gave a Voice to Jewish Immigrants	Honor	
2025	Lesléa Newman	Susan Gal	Joyful Song: A Naming Story	Honor	
2025	Sidura Ludwig	Sophia Vincent Guy	Rising	Honor	
2025	Elisa Boxer	Alianna Rosentsveig	The Tree of Life: How a Holocaust Sapling Inspired the World	Honor	
2025	Linda Leopold Strauss	Tim Smart	Everybody's Book: The Story of the Sarajevo Haggadah	Notable	
2025	Marc Kornblatt	Nanette Regan	Mr. Katz and Me	Notable	
2025	Danielle Sharkan	Selina Alko	Sharing Shalom	Notable	

=== Older Reader (1981–2019) ===
In 2020, the "Older Reader" category was redefined as "Middle Grade".

Award recipients
Year	Author	Illustrator	Book	Result	Ref.
1981	Kathryn Lasky		The Night Journey	Winner	
1982	Marilyn Sachs		Call Me Ruth	Winner	
1983	Rose Zar		In the Mouth of the Wolf	Winner	
1984	Uri Orlev		The Island on Bird Street	Winner	
1985	Carol Snyder		Ike and Mama and the Seven Surprises	Winner	
1985	Miriam Chaikin	Marvin Friedman	Ask Another Question: The Story and Meaning of Passover	Notable	
1985	Miriam Chaikin	Petra Mathers	Yossi Asks the Angels for Help	Notable	
1985	Eth Clifford	Donna Diamond	The Remembering Box	Notable	
1985	Barbara Cohen	Michael J. Deraney	Secret Grove	Notable	
1985	Howard Cushnir	Katherine Kahn	The Secret Spinner: Tales of Rav Gedalia	Notable	
1985	Norman H. Finkelstein	Lois Hokanson and Lars Hokanson	Remember Not to Forget	Notable	
1985	Erwin Herman & Agnes Herman	Katherine Kahn	The Yanov Torah	Notable	
1985	Lenore C. Kipper and Howard I. Gogot	Jana Paiss	The Alef-Bet of Jewish Values: Code Words of Jewish Life	Notable	
1985	Michael Mark		Toba at the Hands of a Thief	Notable	
1985	Maxine Rose Schur	Dale Redpath	Shnook the Peddler	Notable	
1985	Arthur Waskow, David Waskow, and Shoshana Waskow	Amnon Danziger	Before There Was a Before	Notable	
1986	Nancy Pitt		Beyond the High White Wall	Winner	
1986	Jacqueline Bacon	Robert L. Wolfe and Diane Wolfe	Cooking the Israeli Way	Notable	
1986	Miriam Chaikin	Yossi Abulafia	Aviva's Piano	Notable	
1986	Miriam Chaikin	Erika Weihs	Sound the Shofar: The Story and Meaning of Rosh Hashanah and Yom Kippur	Notable	
1986	Paul Cowan	Rachel Cowan	A Torah is Written	Notable	
1986	Myra Cohn Livingston (editor)	Lloyd Bloom	Poems for Jewish Holidays	Notable	
1986	Steven Schnur	Victor Lazzaro	The Narrowest Bar Mitzvah	Notable	
1986	Maxine Schnur	Donna Ruff	Hannah Szenes: A Song of Light	Notable	
1986	Barbara Spector		The Great Jewish Quiz Book	Notable	
1987	Sonia Levitin		The Return	Winner	
1987	Miriam Chaikin	Vera Rosenberry	Esther	Notable	
1987	Miriam Chaikin	Charles Mikolaycak	Exodus	Notable	
1987	Miriam Chaikin	Denise Saldutti	Yossi Tries to Help God	Notable	
1987	Paul J. Citrin	Lindsey Aitken	Joseph's Wardrobe	Notable	
1987	Barbara Cohen	Diane de Groat	The Christmas Revolution	Notable	
1987	Barbara Cohen	Martin Lemelman	First Fast	Notable	
1987	Karla Kuskin	David Frampton	Jerusalem, Shining Still	Notable	
1987	Steven Schnur	Victor Lazzaro	The Return of Morris Schumsky	Notable	
1987	Madeline Wikler and Judyth Groner	Chari Rudin	Miracle Meals: Eight Nights of Food 'n Fun for Chanukah	Notable	
1988	Jane Yolen		The Devil's Arithmetic	Winner	
1988	Jacqueline Dembar Greene		Out of Many Waters	Honor	
1988	Gary Provost and Gail Provost		David and Max	Honor	
1988	Chaya Burstein		A Kid's Catalog of Israel	Notable	
1988	Chaya Burstein		The Mystery of the Coins	Notable	
1988	Miriam Chaikin	Richard Egielski	Friends Forever	Notable	
1988	Barry Cytron		Fire! The Library Is Burning	Notable	
1988	Miriam Elias		And Then There Were Four	Notable	
1988	Johanna Hurwitz	Vera Rosenberry	Anne Frank: Life in Hiding	Notable	
1989	Lois Lowry		Number the Stars	Winner	
1989	Ferida Wolff		Pink Slippers, Bat Mitzvah Blues	Honor	
1989	Sonia Levitin		Silver Days	Honor	
1989	Carol Matas		Lisa's War	Honor	
1989	David A. Adler		We Remember the Holocaust	Notable	
1989	Miriam Chaikin	Denise Saldutti	Feathers in the Wind	Notable	
1989	Leonard Everett Fisher	Leonard Everett Fisher	The Wailing Wall	Notable	
1989	Marc Gellman	Oscar de Mejo	Does God Have a Big Toe?	Notable	
1989	Jane Breskin Zalben		Earth to Andrew O. Blechman	Notable	
1990	Adèle Geras		My Grandmother's Stories	Winner	
1990	Christa Laird		Shadow of the Wall	Honor	
1990	Evelyn Wilde Mayerson		The Cat Who Escaped from Steerage	Honor	
1990	Barbara Barrie		Lone Star	Notable	
1990	Miriam Chaikin	Erika Weihs	Menorahs, Mezuzas, and Other Jewish Symbols	Notable	
1990	Sharlya Gold and Mishael Maswari Caspi	Marjory Wunsch	The Answered Prayer and Other Yemenite Folktales	Notable	
1990	Charlotte Herman	Susan Avishai	The House on Walenska Street	Notable	
1990	Carol Matas		Code Name Kris	Notable	
1990	Eileen Bluestone Sherman		Independence Avenue	Notable	
1990	Yale Strom		A Tree Stands Still: Jewish Youth in Eastern Europe Today	Notable	
1990	Terry Walton Treseder	Lloyd Bloom	Hear O Israel: A Story of the Warsaw Ghetto	Notable	
1990	Fran Weissenberg		The Streets Are Paved with Gold	Notable	
1991	Howard Schwartz & Barbara Rush	Uri Shulevitz	The Diamond Tree: Jewish Tales from Around the World	Winner	
1991	Natalie S. Bober	Vera Rosenberry	Marc Chagall, Painter of Dreams	Notable	
1991	Marilyn Kaye		The Atonement of Mindy Wise	Notable	
1991	Michael Marpugo		Waiting for Anya	Notable	
1991	Uri Orlev, translated by Hillel Halkin		The Man from the Other Side	Notable	
1991	Steve Sanfield	Mikhail Magaril	The Feather Merchants and Other Tales of the Fools of Chelm	Notable	
1991	Ida Vos, translated by Terese Edelstein and Inez Smidt		Hide and Seek	Notable	
1991	Jane Breskin Zalben	Jane Breskin Zalben	The Fortuneteller in 5B	Notable	
1992	Karen Hesse		Letters from Rifka	Winner	
1992	Robert Cormier		Tunes for Bears to Dance to	Honor	
1992	Eilís Dillon		Children of Bach	Notable	
1992	Robert Lehrman		The Store That Mama Built	Notable	
1992	Joan Lowery Nixon		Ellis Island: Land of Hope	Notable	
1992	Seymour Rossel		The Holocaust: The World and the Jews, 1933-1945	Notable	
1992	Phyllis Shalant		Shalom, Geneva Peace	Notable	
1993	Carol Matas		Sworn Enemies	Winner	
1993	Sharon Linnea		Raoul Wallenberg: The Man Who Stopped Death	Honor	
1993	Malka Drucker and Michael Halperin		Jacob's Rescue	Notable	
1993	Sonia Levitin		The Golem and the Dragon Girl	Notable	
1993	Nancy Smiler Levinson	Beth Peck	Sweet Notes, Sour Notes	Notable	
1993	Uri Orlev, translated by Hillel Halkin		Lydia, Queen of Palestine	Notable	
1993	Danny Siegel		Tell Me a Mitzvah	Notable	
1993	Nelly S. Toll		Behind the Secret Window	Notable	
1993	Rudd Van der Rol and Rian Verhoeven, translated by Tony Langham and Plym Peters		Anne Frank: Beyond the Diary	Notable	
1993	Ida Vos		Anna is Still Here	Notable	
1993	Karen Zeinert		The Warsaw Ghetto Uprising	Notable	
1994	Steven Schnur	Herbert Tauss	The Shadow Children	Winner	
1994	Jacqueline Dembar Greene		One Foot Ashore	Honor	
1994	Karen Ackerman	Elizabeth Sayles	The Night Crossing	Notable	
1994	David A. Adler	Karen Ritz	Hilde and Eli: Children of the Holocaust	Notable	
1994	Susan D. Bachrach		Tell Them We Remember: The Story of the Holocaust	Notable	
1994	Lillian Boraks-Nemetz		The Old Brown Suitcase	Notable	
1994	Barbara Cohen	Jan Naimo Jones	Make a Wish Molly	Notable	
1994	Barry Cytron and Phyllis Cytron		Myriam Mendilow, Mother of Jerusalem	Notable	
1994	Malka Drucker	Nancy Patz	The Family Treasury of Jewish Holidays	Notable	
1994	Barbara Diamond Goldin	Neil Waldman	The Passover Journey: A Seder Companion	Notable	
1994	Jacqueline Jules	Michael Cressy	Grey Striped Shirt: How Grandma and Grandpa Survived the Holocaust	Notable	
1994	Sonia Levitin		Escape from Egypt	Notable	
1995	Ida Vos		Dancing on the Bridge of Avignon	Winner	
1995	Carolyn Meyer		Drummers of Jericho	Honor	
1995	David A. Adler	Karen Ritz	Child of the Warsaw Ghetto	Notable	
1995	Molly Cone	Roy Doty	Listen to the Trees	Notable	
1995	Dean Engel and Florence Freedman		Ezra Jack Keats: A Biography with Illustrations	Notable	
1995	Marc Gellman and Thomas Hartman	Joseph A. Smith	How Do You Spell God?: Answers to the Big Questions from Around the World	Notable	
1995	Barbara Diamond Goldin	Erika Weihs	Bat Mitzvah	Notable	
1995	Eric A. Kimmel	Trina Schart Hyman	The Adventures of Hershel of Ostropol	Notable	
1995	Eric A. Kimmel	Erika Weihs	Bar Mitzvah	Notable	
1995	Stephanie McPherson		Ordinary Genius: The Story of Albert Einstein	Notable	
1995	Lila Perl	Donna Ruff	Isaac Bashevis Singer: The Life of a Storyteller	Notable	
1995	Mark Podwal	Mark Podwal	Golem: A Giant Made of Mud	Notable	
1995	Hazel Rochman and Darlene Z. McCampbell, editors		Bearing Witness: Stories of the Holocaust	Notable	
1995	Deborah Lee Rose	Greg Shed	The Rose Horse	Notable	
1995	Nava Semel, translated by Hillel Halkin		Flying Lessons	Notable	
1995	Devra Speregen		Yoni Netanyahu: Commando at Entebbe	Notable	
1995	Gail B. Stewart		Life in the Warsaw Ghetto	Notable	
1995	Xin Xu, with Beverly Friend	Ting Cheng	Legends of the Chinese Jews of Kaifeng	Notable	
1995	Jane Yolen	Jean Gralley	And Twelve Chinese Acrobats	Notable	
1996	Maxine Rose Schur	Brian Pinkney	When I Left My Village	Winner	
1996	Diane Wolkstein	Juan Wijngaard	Esther's Story	Honor	
1996	Marc Gellman	Debbie Tilley	God's Mailbox: More Stories about Stories in the Bible	Notable	
1996	Diane Hoyt-Goldsmith	Lawrence Migdale	Celebrating Hanukkah	Notable	
1996	Hanneke Ippisch		Sky	Notable	
1996	Sharon Kirsch		Fitting In	Notable	
1996	Lila Perl and Marion Blumenthal Lazan		Four Perfect Pebbles: A Holocaust Story	Notable	
1996	Abraham Rabinovich		Teddy Kollek: Builder of Jerusalem	Notable	
1996	Barbara Rogasky	Trina Schart Hyman	The Golem	Notable	
1996	Howard Schwartz & Barbara Rush, editors	Stephen Fieser	The Wonder Child and Other Jewish Fairy Tales	Notable	
1996	Sheila Segal		Women of Valor: Stories of Great Jewish Women Who Helped Shape the Twentieth Century	Notable	
1996	Ellen Stern		Elie Wiesel: A Voice for Humanity	Notable	
1996	Dvora Waysman		Back of Beyond: A Bar Mitzvah Journey	Notable	
1996	David Wisniewski	David Wisniewski	Golem	Notable	
1996	Jane Breskin Zalben		Unfinished Dreams	Notable	
1997	Nina Jaffe	Elivia Savadier	The Mysterious Visitor: Stories of the Prophet Elijah	Winner	
1997	Livia Bitton-Jackson		I Have Lived a Thousand Years: Growing Up in the Holocaust	Honor	
1997	Lee Cha'ah Batterman	James Wattling	Two Cents and a Milk Bottle	Notable	
1997	Ilene Cooper	John Thompson	The Dead Sea Scrolls	Notable	
1997	Kirk Douglas		The Broken Mirror: A Novella	Notable	
1997	Alison Leslie Gold		Memories of Anne Frank: Reflections of a Childhood Friend	Notable	
1997	Barbara Diamond Goldin	Elaine Greenstein	While the Candles Burn: Eight Stories for Hanukkah	Notable	
1997	Gloria Kamen		Hidden Music: The Life of Fanny Mendelssohn	Notable	
1997	Jan Mark	David Parkin	God's Story: How God Made Mankind	Notable	
1997	Carol Matas		The Garden	Notable	
1997	Ken Mochizuki	Dom Lee	Passage to Freedom: The Sugihara Story	Notable	
1997	Steven Schnur	Meryl Treatner	The Koufax Dilemma	Notable	
1997	Faye Silton		Of Heroes, Hooks, and Heirlooms	Notable	
1997	Eva Wiseman		A Place Not Home	Notable	
1998	Donna Jo Napoli		Stones in Water	Winner	
1998	Dede Fox Ducharme		The Treasure in the Tiny Blue Tin	Honor	
1998	Sonia Levitin		The Singing Mountain	Honor	
1998	Anita Lobel		No Pretty Pictures: A Child of War	Honor	
1998	Miriam Chaikin	David Frampton	Clouds of Glory	Notable	
1998	Johanna Hurwitz	Mary Azarian	Faraway Summer	Notable	
1998	Eric A. Kimmel	Emily Lisker	A Hanukkah Treasury	Notable	
1998	Jane Kurtz		The Storyteller's Beads	Notable	
1998	Kathryn Lasky		Dreams of the Golden Country: The Diary of Zipporah Feldman, A Jewish Immigrant Girl	Notable	
1998	Carol Matas		Greater Than Angels	Notable	
1998	Maida Silverman	Susan Avishai	Israel: The Founding of a Modern Nation	Notable	
1998	Neil Waldman		Masada	Notable	
1999	Sybil Rosen		The Speed of Light	Winner	
1999	Barbara Diamond Goldin	Jerry Pinkney	Journeys with Elijah	Honor	
1999	Julius Lester	Emily Lisker	When The Beginning Began: Stories About God, the Creatures and Us	Honor	
1999	Vera Propp		When the Soldiers Were Gone	Honor	
1999	Sandy Asher, editor		With All My Heart, With All My Mind: Thirteen Stories about Growing Up Jewish	Notable	
1999	Miriam Bat Ami		Two Suns in the Sky	Notable	
1999	Livia Bitton-Jackson		My Bridges of Hope: Searching for Life and Love after Auschwitz	Notable	
1999	Sandra Giddens		Escape: Teens Who Escaped the Holocaust to Freedom	Notable	
1999	Beatrice Gormley		Miriam	Notable	
1999	Anna Levine		Running on Eggs	Notable	
1999	Sonia Levitin		The Cure	Notable	
1999	Mikki Machlin		My Name Is Not Gussie	Notable	
1999	Gregory Maguire		The Good Liar	Notable	
1999	Carol Matas		In My Enemy's House	Notable	
1999	Lois Metzger		Missing Girls	Notable	
1999	Howard Schwartz & Barbara Rush, editors	Michael Iofin	A Coat for the Moon and Other Jewish Tales	Notable	
1999	John Severance		Einstein: Visionary Scientist	Notable	
1999	Marc Talbert		Star of Luís	Notable	
2000	Ida Vos		The Key Is Lost	Winner	
2000	Amy Hest	Sonja Lamut	Love You, Soldier	Honor	
2000	Susan Goldman Rubin	Neil Waldman	Fireflies in the Dark: The Story of Friedl Dicker-Brandeis and the Children of Terezin	Honor	
2000	Gabriella Carmi, translated by Yael Lotan		Samir and Yonatan	Notable	
2000	Carmen Agra Deedy	Henry Sorensen	The Yellow Star: The Legend of King Christian X of Denmark	Notable	
2000	Arlene B. Hirschfelder		Photo Odyssey: Solomon Carvalho's Remarkable Western Adventure, 1853-1854	Notable	
2000	Ann Isaacs		Torn Thread	Notable	
2000	Nina Jaffe	Kelly Stribling Sutherland	Tales for the Seventh Day	Notable	
2000	Eric A. Kimmel	Mordicai Gerstein	The Jar of Fools: Eight Hanukkah Stories from Chelm	Notable	
2000	Julius Lester		Pharaoh's Daughter	Notable	
2000	Ellen Levine		Darkness over Denmark: The Danish Resistance and the Rescue of the Jews	Notable	
2000	Marissa Moss	Marissa Moss	Hannah's Journal: The Story of an Immigrant Girl	Notable	
2000	Rahel Musleah	Louise August	Why on This Night? A Passover Haggadah for Family Celebration	Notable	
2000	Patricia Polacco	Patricia Polacco	The Butterfly	Notable	
2000	Rosalind Schanzer		Escaping to America: A True Story	Notable	
2000	Howard Schwartz	Monique Passicot	The Day the Rabbi Disappeared: Jewish Holiday Tales of Magic	Notable	
2000	Frank Dabba Smith	Mendel Grossman	My Secret Camera: Life in the Lodz Ghetto	Notable	
2000	Marilyn Taylor		Faraway Home	Notable	
2000	Eva Vogiel		Invisible Chains	Notable	
2000	Irene Watts		Remember Me: A Search for Refuge in Wartime Britain	Notable	
2001	Catherine Reef		Sigmund Freud: Pioneer of the Mind	Winner	
2001	Martha Attema		Daughter of Light	Notable	
2001	Toby Axelrod		Hans and Sophie Scholl: German Resisters of the White Rose	Notable	
2001	Harriet Feder		Death on Sacred Ground	Notable	
2001	Kathy Kacer		Clara's War	Notable	
2001	Teri Kanefield		Rivka's Way	Notable	
2001	Mark Kornblatt		Understanding Buddy	Notable	
2001	Amy Koss		Stolen Words	Notable	
2001	Fran Manushkin	Uri Shulevitz	Daughter of Fire: Heroines of the Bible	Notable	
2001	Carol Matas		The War Within	Notable	
2001	Gloria Miklowitz		Secrets in the House of Delgado	Notable	
2001	Connie Steiner	Denis Rodier	Shoes for Amelie	Notable	
2001	Eva Vogiel		Friend of Foe?	Notable	
2001	Andrea Warren		Surviving Hitler: A Boy in the Nazi Death Camps	Notable	
2001	Ilse Weber, translated by Ruth and Hans Fisher		Mendel Rosenbusch: Tales for Jewish Children	Notable	
2001	Jane Breskin Zalben	Donna Diamond	The Magic Menorah: A Modern Chanukah Tale	Notable	
2002	Karen Levine		Hana's Suitcase	Winner	
2002	Eve Bunting	K. Wendy Popp	One Candle	Honor	
2002	Esther Hautzig	Beth Peck	A Picture of Grandmother	Honor	
2002	Barbara Rogasky		Smoke and Ashes: The Story of the Holocaust, Revised and Expanded	Honor	
2002	Chaya Burstein		The Kids' Cartoon Bible	Notable	
2002	Miriam Chaikin	Stephen Fieser	Alexandra's Scroll: The Story of the First Hanukkah	Notable	
2002	Miriam Chaikin	Alexander Koshkin	Angels Sweep the Desert Floor: Bible Legends about Moses in the Wilderness	Notable	
2002	Andrea Cheng		Marika	Notable	
2002	Ilene Cooper	Elivia Savadier	Jewish Holidays All Year Round: A Family Treasury	Notable	
2002	Norman H. Finkelstein		Forged in Freedom: Shaping the Jewish-American Experience	Notable	
2002	Marc Gellman	Harry Bliss	And God Cried, Too: A Kid's Book About Healing and Hope	Notable	
2002	James C. Giblin		The Life and Death of Adolf Hitler	Notable	
2002	Clive A. Lawton		Auschwitz: The Story of a Nazi Death Camp	Notable	
2002	Carol Ann Lee		Anne Frank's Story: Her Life Retold for Children	Notable	
2002	Barbara Rogasky		Smoke	Notable	
2002	Carol Matas		Sparks Fly Upward	Notable	
2002	Richard Michelson	Neil Waldman	Too Young for Yiddish	Notable	
2002	Kenneth Roseman		Jeremiah's Promise: An Adventure in Modern Israel	Notable	
2002	Howard Schwartz	Stephen Fieser	Invisible Kingdoms: Jewish Tales of Angels, Spirits, and Demons	Notable	
2002	Eva Vogiel		Facing the Music	Notable	
2002	Neil Waldman	Neil Waldman	The Promised Land: The Birth of the Jewish People	Notable	
2002	Irene Watts		Finding Sophie: A Search for Belonging in Postwar Britain	Notable	
2003	Nancy Patz		Who Was the Woman Who Wore the Hat?	Winner	
2003	Marian Broida		Ancient Israelites and Their Neighbors: An Activity Guide	Honor	
2003	Edward Feinstein		Tough Questions Jews Ask: A Young Adult's Guide to Building a Jewish Life	Honor	
2003	Tracy Mack		Birdland	Honor	
2003	Anna Claybourne		Golda Meir	Notable	
2003	Adèle Geras	Anita Lobel	My Grandmother's Stories: A Collection of Jewish Folktales	Notable	
2003	Karen Hesse	Brian Pinkney	The Stone Lamp: Eight Stories of Hanukkah through History	Notable	
2003	Deborah Hopkinson		Shutting Out the Sky: Life in the Tenements of New York	Notable	
2003	Sonia Levitin		Room in the Heart	Notable	
2003	Carol Matas		Rosie in New York City: Gotcha!	Notable	
2003	Gloria Miklowitz		The Enemy Has a Face	Notable	
2003	Or Rose		Abraham Joshua Heschel: Man of Spirit, Man of Action	Notable	
2003	Liz Sonneborn		Murder at the 1972 Olympics in Munich	Notable	
2003	Jerry Spinelli		Milkweed	Notable	
2003	Tanya Stone		Ilan Ramon: Israel's First Astronaut	Notable	
2003	Luba Tryszynska-Frederick, as told to Michelle McCann	Ann Marshall	Luba: The Angel of Bergen-Belsen	Notable	
2003	Jude Welton		Marc Chagall	Notable	
2004	Pnina Moed Kass		Real Time	Winner	
2004	David Chotjewitz, translated by Doris Orgel		Daniel, Half-Human	Honor	
2004	Anne Dublin		Bobbie Rosenfeld: The Olympian Who Could Do Everything	Honor	
2004	Karen Hesse	Wendy Watson	The Cats in Krasinski Square	Honor	
2004	Eric A. Kimmel		Wonders and Miracles: A Passover Companion	Honor	
2004	Sylvie Weil, translated by Gillian Rosner		My Guardian Angel	Honor	
2004	David A. Adler		The Kids' Catalog of Hanukkah	Notable	
2004	Hagit Allon and Lena Zehavi	Yossi Abulafia	The Mystery of the Dead Sea Scrolls	Notable	
2004	Bruce Feiler	Sasha Meret	Walking the Bible: An Illustrated Journey for Kids	Notable	
2004	Susan Goldman Rubin		L'Chaim: to Jewish life in America	Notable	
2004	Margaret J. Goldstein		Israel in Pictures	Notable	
2004	David Grossman, translated by Betsy Rosenberg		Duel	Notable	
2004	Tony Johnston	Ron Mazellan	The Harmonica	Notable	
2004	Kathy Kacer		The Underground Reporters	Notable	
2004	Kathy Walden Kaplan		The Dog of Knots	Notable	
2004	Gail Langer Karwoski	Robert Papp	Quake! Disaster in San Francisco, 1906	Notable	
2004	Carol Matas		Rosie in Los Angeles: Action!	Notable	
2004	Sharon E. McKay		Esther	Notable	
2004	Stephanie McPherson		Albert Einstein	Notable	
2004	Moshe Moscowitz	David Sokoloff	The Queen of Persia	Notable	
2004	M.E. Rabb		Missing Persons: The Chocolate Lover	Notable	
2004	Peter W. Schroeder and Dagmar Schroeder-Hildebrand		Six Million Paper Clips	Notable	
2004	Josepha Sherman		Your Travel Guide to Ancient Israel	Notable	
2004	Barbara Sofer		Ilan Ramon: Israel's Space Hero	Notable	
2004	Devra Newberger Speregen		Ilan Ramon: Jewish Star	Notable	
2004	Judy Steinberg and Barbara Tabs	Bill Hauser	Matzah Meals: A Passover Cookbook for Kids (revised edition)	Notable	
2005	Dating system changed this year to reflect year in which award is announced instead of year of publication.				
2006	Sarah Darer Littman		Confessions of a Closet Catholic	Winner	
2006	Esther Nisenthal Krinitz and Bernice Steinhardt		Memories of Survival	Honor	
2006	Donna Jo Napoli		The King of Mulberry Street	Honor	
2006	Holly-Jane Rahlens		Prince William, Maximilian Minsky, and Me	Honor	
2006	Uri Shulevitz	Uri Shulevitz	The Travels of Benjamin of Tudela: Through Three Continents in the Twelfth Century	Honor	
2006	Penina Adelman, Ali Feldman and Shulamit Reinharz		The JGirls' Guide: The Young Jewish Woman's Handbook for Coming of Age	Notable	
2006	Robert J. Avrech		The Hebrew Kid and the Apache Maiden	Notable	
2006	Susan Campbell Bartoletti		Hitler Youth: Growing Up in Hitler's Shadow	Notable	
2006	Rebecca Tova Ben-Zvi	Susanna Natti	Four Sides, Eight Nights: A New Spin on Hanukkah	Notable	
2006	Marfe Ferguson Delano		Genius: A Photobiography of Albert Einstein	Notable	
2006	Linda Glaser		Bridge to America	Notable	
2006	Howard Greenfeld		A Promise Fulfilled: Theodor Herzl, Chaim Weitzmann, and David Ben-Gurion, and the Creation of the State of Israel	Notable	
2006	Kathryn Lasky		Broken Soup	Notable	
2006	Isaac Millman		Hidden Child	Notable	
2006	June Levitt Nislick		Zayda Was a Cowboy	Notable	
2006	Josephine Poole	Angela Barrett	Anne Frank	Notable	
2006	Doreen Rappaport	Emily Arnold McCully	The Secret Seder	Notable	
2006	Susan Goldman Rubin	Bill Farnsworth	The Flag with Fifty-Six Stars	Notable	
2006	Marisabina Russo		Always Remember Me: How One Family Survived World War II	Notable	
2006	Marilyn Sachs		Lost in America	Notable	
2006	Tammar Stein		Light Years	Notable	
2006	Eve Tal		Double Crossing: A Jewish Immigration Story	Notable	
2006	Valérie Zenatti, translated by Adriana Hunter		When I Was a Soldier: A Memoir	Notable	
2007	Brenda Ferber		Julia's Kitchen	Winner	
2007	Esme Raji Codell		Vive La Paris	Honor	
2007	Sheldon Oberman		Solomon and the Ant and Other Jewish Folktales	Honor	
2007	Jennifer Roy		Yellow Star	Honor	
2007	Linda Press Wulf		The Night of the Burning: Devorah's Story	Honor	
2007	Judith Z. Abrams		The Secret World of Kabbalah	Notable	
2007	Sid Fleischman		Escape! The Story of the Great Houdini	Notable	
2007	D. Dina Friedman		Escaping into the Night	Notable	
2007	Jacob Glatstein, translated by Jeffrey Shandler		Emil and Karl	Notable	
2007	Kathy Kacer		Hiding Edith: A True Story	Notable	
2007	Marlee Pinsker	François Thisdale	In the Days of Sand and Stars	Notable	
2007	Susan Goldman Rubin with Ela Weissberger		The Cat with the Yellow Star: Coming of Age in Terezin	Notable	
2007	Karen Schwabach		A Pickpocket's Tale	Notable	
2007	Ellen Schwartz		Stealing Home	Notable	
2008	Sid Fleischman		The Entertainer and the Dybbuk	Winner	
2008	Angela Gluck Wood and Dan Stone.		Holocaust: The Events and Their Impact on Real People	Honor	
2008	Peter Lane Taylor and Christos Nicola		The Secret of Priest's Grotto: A Holocaust Survival Story	Honor	
2008	Tina Grimberg		Out of Line: Growing Up Soviet	Notable	
2008	Eric A. Kimmel	Matthew Trueman	A Picture for Marc	Notable	
2008	Ann Kramer		Anne Frank: The Young Writer Who Told the World Her Story	Notable	
2008	Constance Leeds		The Silver Cup	Notable	
2008	Tami Lehman-Wilzig	Elizabeth Wolf	Passover Around the World	Notable	
2008	Jane Zalben	Jane Zalben	Story	Notable	
2008	Carol Matas		Whirlwind	Notable	
2008	Rebecca O'Connell	Majella Lue Sue	Penina Levine Is a Hard-Boiled Egg	Notable	
2008	T. S. Yavin		All-Star Season	Notable	
2009	Karen Hesse		Brooklyn Bridge	Winner	
2009	Aranka Siegal		Memories of Babi	Honor	
2009	Susan Campbell Bartoletti		The Boy Who Dared: A Novel Based on the True Story of a Hitler Youth	Notable	
2009	Julie Durango	Tom Pohrt	The Walls of Cartegena	Notable	
2009	Edward M. Feinstein		Capturing the Moon	Notable	
2009	Stephanie Fitzgerald		Kristallnacht, the Night of Broken Glass: Igniting the Nazi War Against Jews	Notable	
2009	Charlotte Herman	LeUyen Pham	My Chocolate Year	Notable	
2009	Michael Morpurgo	Michael Forman	The Mozart Question	Notable	
2009	Marc Tyler Nobleman	Ross McDonald	Boys of Steel: The Creators of Superman	Notable	
2009	Bat-Chen Shahak		The Bat-Chen Diaries: Selected Writings	Notable	
2009	Barbara Sofer		Keeping Israel Safe: Serving in the Israel Defense Forces	Notable	
2009	Joan Betty Stuchner	Cynthia Nugent	Honey Cake	Notable	
2010	Robin Friedman		The Importance of Wings	Winner	
2010	Menno Metselaar and Ruud van der Rol, translated by Arnold J. Pomerans		Anne Frank: Her Life in Words and Pictures from the Archives of the Anne Frank House	Honor	
2010	Annika Thor, translated by Linda Schenck		A Faraway Island	Honor	
2010	Tomek Bogacki		The Champion of Children: The Story of Janusz Korczak	Notable	
2010	Kathy Clark		Guardian Angel House	Notable	
2010	Jacqueline Dembar Greene	Robert Hunt	Rebecca Series (American Girl Collection)	Notable	
2010	Mary Ann Hoberman	Wendy Anderson Halperin	Strawberry Hill	Notable	
2010	Russell Martin and Lydia Nibley		The Mysteries of Beethoven's Hair	Notable	
2010	Carol Garbuny Vogel and Yossi Leshem		The Man Who Flies with Birds	Notable	
2010	Irene N. Watts	Kathryn E. Shoemaker	Clay Man: The Golem of Prague	Notable	
2010	Sylvia Weil		Elvina's Mirror	Notable	
2011	Barry Deutsch	Barry Deutsch	Hereville: How Mirka Got Her Sword	Winner	
2011	Carla Jablonski	Leland Purvis	Resistance	Honor	
2011	Evelyn Krieger		One Is Not a Lonely Number	Honor	
2011	Susan Lynn Meyer		Black Radishes	Honor	
2011	Fern Schumer Chapman		Is It Night or Day?	Notable	
2011	Laurie Coulter	Mary Newbigging	Kings and Carpenters: One Hundred Bible Land Jobs You Might Have Praised or Panned	Notable	
2011	Stacia Deutsch and Rhody Cohon	Craig Orback	Hot Pursuit: Murder in Mississippi	Notable	
2011	Anne Dublin	Qin Leng	The Orphan Rescue	Notable	
2011	Debbie Levy		The Year of Goodbyes	Notable	
2011	Trisha Marx	Cindy Karp	Sharing Our Homeland: Palestinian and Jewish Children at Summer Peace Camp	Notable	
2011	Sylvia Rouss	Martha Rast	Mitzvah the Mutt	Notable	
2012	Susan Goldman Rubin		Music Was It: Young Leonard Bernstein	Winner	
2012	Trina Robbins	Anne Timmons and Mo Oh	Lily Renee, Escape Artist: from Holocaust Survivor to Comic Book Pioneer	Honor	
2012	Shelley Sommer		Hammerin’ Hank Greenberg: Baseball Pioneer	Honor	
2012	Marcia Vaughan	Ron Mazellan	Irena's Jars of Secrets	Honor	
2012	Avrohom Biderman		The Mishkan: Its Structure and Its Sacred Vessels	Notable	
2012	Albert Marrin		Flesh & Blood So Cheap: The Triangle Fire and Its Legacy	Notable	
2012	Yona Zeldis McDonough	Heather Maione	The Cats in the Doll Shop	Notable	
2012	Erica S. Perl		When Life Gives You O.J.	Notable	
2012	Susan Goldman Rubin	Bill Farnsworth	Irena Sendler and the Children of the Warsaw Ghetto	Notable	
2012	Ruth Thomson		Terezin: Voices from the Holocaust	Notable	
2013	Louise Borden		His Name Was Raoul Wallenberg	Winner	
2013	Ann Redisch Stampler	Carol Liddiment	The Wooden Sword: A Jewish Folktale from Afghanistan	Honor	
2014	Patricia Polacco	Patricia Polacco	The Blessing Cup	Winner	
2014	Leon Leyson, with Marilyn J. Harran and Elisabeth B. Leyson		The Boy on the Wooden Box: How the Impossible Became Possible...on Schindler's list	Honor	
2014	Carol Matas		Dear Canada: Pieces of the Past: The Holocaust Diary of Rose Rabinowitz, Winnipeg, Manitoba, 1948	Honor	
2015	Loïc Dauvillier	Marc Lizano and Greg Salsedo (colors)	Hidden: A Child's Story of the Holocaust	Winner	
2015	Donna Gephart		Death by Toilet Paper	Honor	
2015	Jennifer Elvgren	Fabio Santomauro	Whispering Town	Honor	
2016	Aharon Appelfeld	Philippe Dumas	Adam and Thomas	Winner	
2016	Barry Deutsch	Barry Deutsch	Hereville: How Mirka Caught a Fish	Honor	
2016	Angela Cerrito		The Safest Lie	Notable	
2016	Irene Cohen-Janka	Maurizio A. C. Quarello	Mr. Doctor: Janusz Korczak and the Orphans of the Warsaw Ghetto	Notable	
2016	Cynthia Levinson		Watch Out for Flying Kids: How Two Circuses, Two Countries, and Nine Kids Confront Conflict and Build Community	Notable	
2016	J. Patrick Lewis	Yevgenia Nayberg	The Wren and the Sparrow	Notable	
2016	Rob Sharenow		The Girl in the Torch	Notable	
2017	Adam Gidwitz	Hatem Aly	The Inquisitor's Tale: Or, The Three Magical Children and Their Holy Dog	Winner	
2017	Joel Izzy		Driedels on the Brain	Honor	
2017	Andrea Davis Pinkney	Johnson Steve and Lou Fancher	A Poem for Peter: The Story of Ezra Jack Keats and the Creation of The Snowy Day	Honor	
2017	Rona Arato		The Ship to Nowhere: On Board the Exodus	Notable	
2017	Tilar J. Mazzeo, adapted by Mary Cronk Farrell		Irena's Children: Young Readers Edition: A True Story of Courage	Notable	
2017	Yona Zeldis McDonough		The Bicycle Spy	Notable	
2017	Susan Lynn Meyer		Skating with the Statue of Liberty	Notable	
2018	Alan Gratz		Refugee	Winner	
2018	Susan Krawitz		Viva Rose!	Honor	
2018	Madelyn Rosenberg and Wendy Wan-Long Shang		This is Just a Test	Honor	
2018	Tammar Stein		The Six Day Hero	Honor	
2018	Michelle Bisson	El Primo Ramón	Hedy's Journey: The True Story of a Hungarian Girl Fleeing the Holocaust	Notable	
2018	Mona Golabek and Lee Cohen, adapted by Emil Sher		The Children of Willesden Lane: A True Story of Hope and Survival during World War II: Young Readers Edition	Notable	
2018	Sydelle Pearl		Wordwings	Notable	
2018	R. M. Romero		The Dollmaker of Krakow	Notable	
2019	Jonathan Auxier		Sweep: The Story of a Girl and Her Monster	Winner	
2019	Erica Perl		All Three Stooges	Honor	
2019	Elissa Brent Weissman		The Length of a String	Honor	
2019	Anne Frank, adapted by Ari Folman	David Polonsky	Anne Frank's Diary: The Graphic Adaptation	Notable	
2019	Lisa Greenwald		12 Before 13	Notable	
2019	Jacqueline Jules	Kristina Swarner	Light the Menorah: A Hanukkah Handbook	Notable	
2020	R. J. Palacio	R. J. Palacio	White Bird: A Wonder Story	Winner	
2020	Sofiya Pasternack		Anya and the Dragon	Honor	
2020	Andrew Maraniss		Games of Deception: The True Story of the First U.S. Olympic Basketball Team at the 1936 Olympics in Hitler's Germany	Honor	
2020	Kathy Kacer		Masters of Silence	Notable	
2020	Edeet Ravel		A Boy is Not a Bird	Notable	
2020	Ferida Wolff	Margeaux Lucas	Rachel's Roses	Notable	
2021	M. Evan Wolkenstein		Turtle Boy	Winner	
2021	Anne Blankman		The Blackbird Girls	Honor	
2021	Tziporah Cohen		No Vacancy	Honor	
2021	Sofiya Pasternack		Anya and the Nightingale	Honor	
2021	Tammar Stein		Beni's War	Notable	
2021	Deborah Hopkinson		We Had to Be Brave: Escaping the Nazis on the Kindertransport	Notable	
2021	Saadia Faruqi and Laura Shovan		A Place at the Table	Notable	
2021	Ruth Behar		Letters from Cuba	Notable	
2022	Veera Hiranandani		How to Find What You're Not Looking For	Winner	
2022	Eugene Yelchin	Eugene Yelchin	The Genius Under the Table: Growing up Behind the Iron Curtain	Honor	
2022	Gordon Korman		Linked	Honor	
2022	Chris Baron		The Magical Imperfect	Notable	
2022	Joanne Levy		Sorry For Your Loss	Notable	
2022	Allison Marks and Wayne Marks		Benny Feldman's All-Star Klezmer Band	Notable	
2023	Mari Lowe		Aviva vs. the Dybbuk	Winner	
2023	Meira Drazin		Honey and Me	Honor	
2023	Sofiya Pasternack		Black Bird, Blue Road	Honor	
2023	A. J. Sass		Ellen Outside the Lines	Honor	
2023	Susan Hood, with Greg Dawson		Alias Anna: A True Story of Outwitting the Nazis	Notable	
2023	Marissa Moss	Marissa Moss	The Woman Who Split the Atom: The Life of Lise Meitner	Notable	
2023	Stacy Nockowitz		The Prince of Steel Pier	Notable	
2024	Mari Lowe		The Dubious Pranks of Shaindy Goodman	Winner	
2024	Deke Moulton		Don’t Want to Be Your Monster	Honor	
2024	Joshua S. Levy		The Jake Show	Honor	
2024	Noa Nimrodi		Not So Shy	Honor	
2024	Susan Lynn Meyer		A Sky Full of Song	Honor	
2025	Estelle Nadel and Bethany Strout	Sammy Savos	The Girl Who Sang: A Holocaust Memoir of Hope and Survival	Winner	
2025	Ruth Behar		Across So Many Seas	Honor	
2025	Joshua S. Levy		Finn and Ezra's Bar Mitzvah Time Loop	Honor	
2025	A. J. Sass		Just Shy of Ordinary	Honor	
2025	Deke Moulton		Benji Zeb is a Ravenous Werewolf	Notable	
2025	Adam Gidwitz		Max in the House of Spies: A Tale of World War II	Notable	
2025	Deborah Lakritz		Things That Shimmer	Notable	

=== Teen Reader / Young Adult (1985–present) ===
The "Teen Reader" category was first issued in 1985, though it was released intermittently. In 2020, the category was renamed as the "Young Adult" category.

Year	Author	Illustrator	Book	Result	Ref.
1985	Judie Angell		One Way to Ansonia	Notable	
1985	Linda Atkinson		In Kindling Flame: The Story of Hannah Senesh, 1921-1944	Notable	
1985	Margery Evernden		The Dream Keeper	Notable	
1985	Stephen Kaufman		Does Anyone Here Know the Way to Thirteen?	Notable	
1985	Leonie Ossowski		Star without a Sky	Notable	
1985	Sarah Silberstein Swartz		Bar Mitzvah	Notable	
1986	Donn Kushner		Uncle Jacob's Ghost Story	Notable	
1986	Marilyn Lager	Eric Lager	Sigmund Freud: Doctor of the Mind	Notable	
1986	Nancy Smiler Levinson		I Lift My Lamp: Emma Lazarus and the Statue of Liberty	Notable	
1986	Anne E. Neimark		One Man's Valor: Leo Baeck and the Holocaust	Notable	
1986	Eileen Bluestone Sherman		Monday in Odessa	Notable	
1986	Miriam Stark Zakon	Sigmund Forst	The Floating Minyan of Pirate's Cove	Notable	
1987	Merrill Joah Gerber		Also Known as Sadzia! The Belly Dancer!	Notable	
1987	Malka Drucker		Eliezer Ben-Yehuda: The Father of Modern Hebrew	Notable	
1987	David Gross		A Justice for All the People: Louis D. Brandeis	Notable	
1987	Hazel Krantz		Daughter of My People: Henrietta Szold and Hadassah	Notable	
1987	Lawrence Kushner	Devis Grebu	The Book of Miracles: A Young Person's Guide to Jewish Spirituality	Notable	
1987	Ilana Shamir (editor)		The Young Reader's Encyclopedia of Jewish History	Notable	
1987	Pu'ah Shteiner		Forever My Jerusalem	Notable	
1988	Milton Meltzer		Rescue: The Story of How Gentiles Saved Jews in the Holocaust	Honor	
1988	David M. Brownstone		The Jewish American Heritage	Notable	
1988	Diane Lefer		Emma Lazarus	Notable	
1988	Barbara Rogasky		Smoke and Ashes: The Story of the Holocaust	Notable	
1988	Renee Roth-Hano		Touch Wood: A Girlhood in Occupied France	Notable	
1989	Mark Bernheim		Father of the Orphans: The Story of Janusz Korczak	Notable	
1989	Norman H. Finkelstein		The Other 1492: Jewish Settlement in the New World	Notable	
1989	Yair Hoffman		The World of the Bible for Young Readers	Notable	
1989	Pamela Melnikoff		Plots and Players	Notable	
1989	Margaret Sacks		Beyond Safe Boundaries	Notable	
1989	Efraim Sevela		We Were Not Like Other People	Notable	
1995	Gila Almagor, translated by Hillel Schenker		Under the Domim Tree	Notable	
1995	Elanor Ayer, et al.		Parallel Journeys	Notable	
1995	Lynne Reid Banks		Broken Bridge	Notable	
1995	Hazel Krantz		Look to the Hills	Notable	
1995	Christa Laird		But Can the Phoenix Sing?	Notable	
1995	Isobel V. Morin		Days of Judgment: The World War II War Crimes Trials	Notable	
1995	Lesléa Newman		Fat Chance	Notable	
1995	Uri Orlev, translated by Hillel Halkin		The Lady with the Hat	Notable	
1996	Tricia Andryszewski		The Amazing Life of Moe Berg: Catcher, Scholar, Spy	Notable	
1996	Vivian Grey		Moe Berg: The Spy Behind Home Plate	Notable	
1996	Gerald Hausman		Night Flight	Notable	
1996	Hadley Irwin		Sarah with an H	Notable	
1996	Carol Matas		After the War	Notable	
1996	Carolyn Meyer		Gideon's People	Notable	
1996	Laura E. Williams		Behind the Bedroom Wall	Notable	
1997	Norman H. Finkelstein		Heeding the Call: Jewish Voices in America's Civil Rights Struggle	Notable	
1997	Maxine Rose Schur		Sacred Shadows	Notable	
1998	Edith Baer		Walk the Dark Streets	Notable	
1998	Leonard Everett Fisher		To Bigotry No Sanction: The Story of the Oldest Synagogue in America	Notable	
1998	Gloria Miklowitz		Masada: The Last Fortress	Notable	
1998	Schoschana Rabinovici, translated by James Skofield		Thanks to My Mother	Notable	
1998	Kathryn Winter		Katarina	Notable	
2001	Howard Greenfield		After the Holocaust	Notable	
2001	Gary D. Schmidt		Mara's Stories: Glimmers in the Dark	Notable	
2007	Markus Zusak		The Book Thief	Winner	
2007	Alice Hoffman		Incantation	Honor	
2007	Dana Reinhardt		A Brief Chapter in My Impossible Life	Honor	
2007	Deborah Bodin Cohen		Lilith's Ark: Teenage Tales of Biblical Women	Notable	
2007	Jordan Sonnenblick		Notes from the Midnight Driver	Notable	
2007	T. K. Welsh		The Unresolved	Notable	
2008	Sonia Levitin		Strange Relations	Winner	
2008	Mirjam Pressler, translated by Erik J. Macki		Let Sleeping Dogs Lie	Honor	
2008	Simone Elkeles		How to Ruin My Teenage Life	Notable	
2008	Margo Rabb		Cures for Heartbreak	Notable	
2008	Deborah Durlan DeSaix & Karen Gray Ruelle		Hidden on the Mountain: Stories of Children Sheltered from the Nazis in Le Chambon	Notable	
2008	Marv Wolfman	Mario Ruiz	Homeland: The Illustrated History of the State of Israel	Notable	
2009	Valérie Zenatti		A Bottle in the Gaza Sea	Winner	
2009	Anna Levine		Freefall	Honor	
2009	Robin Friedman		Nothing	Notable	
2009	Rutka Laskier		Rutka's Notebook: A Voice from the Holocaust	Notable	
2009	Leanne Lieberman		Gravity	Notable	
2009	Carol Matas		The Freak	Notable	
2010	Margarita Engle		Tropical Secrets: Holocaust Refugees in Cuba	Winner	
2010	Jacqueline Davies		Lost	Honor	
2010	Selma Kritzer Silverberg		Naomi's Song	Honor	
2010	Libi Astaire		The Disappearing Dowry: An Ezra Melamed Mystery	Notable	
2010	Eric Heuvel		A Family Secret/The Search	Notable	
2010	Micol Ostow	David Ostow	So Punk Rock (and Other Ways to Disappoint Your Mother)	Notable	
2010	Eve Goldberg Tal		Cursing Columbus	Notable	
2010	Eva Wiseman		Puppet	Notable	
2010	Kim Ablon Whitney		The Other Half of Life	Notable	
2011	Dana Reinhardt		The Things a Brother Knows	Winner	
2011	Eishes Chayil		Hush	Honor	
2011	Morris Gleitzman		Once	Honor	
2011	Sarah Darer Littman		Life, After	Honor	
2011	Elaine Marie Alphin		An Unspeakable Crime: The Prosecution and Persecution of Leo Frank	Notable	
2011	Sharon Dogar		Annexed	Notable	
2011	Margie Gelbwasser		Inconvenient	Notable	
2011	Sid Jacobson and Ernie Colón		Anne Frank: The Anne Frank House Authorized Graphic Biography	Notable	
2011	Jenny Meyerhoff		Queen of Secrets	Notable	
2011	Haya Leah Molnar		Under a Red Sky: Memoir of a Childhood in Communist Romania	Notable	
2011	Judie Oron		Cry of the Giraffe	Notable	
2012	Robert Sharenow		The Berlin Boxing Club	Winner	
2012	Morris Gleitzman		Then	Honor	
2012	Shirley Reva Vernick		The Blood Lie	Honor	
2012	Paul B. Janeczko		Requiem: Poems of the Terezin Ghetto	Notable	
2012	Amy Fellner Dominy		OyMG	Notable	
2013	Deborah Heiligman		Intentions	Winner	
2013	Doreen Rappaport		Beyond Courage: The Untold Story of Jewish Resistance During the Holocaust	Honor	
2014	Neal Bascomb		The Nazi Hunters: How a Team of Spies and Survivors Captured the World's Most Notorious Nazi	Winner	
2014	Robyn Bavati		Dancing in the Dark	Honor	
2014	Aline Sax, translated by Laura Watkinson	Caryl Strzelecki	The War Within These Walls	Honor	
2015	Donna Jo Napoli		Storm	Winner	
2015	Lila Perl		Isabel's War	Honor	
2015	Una LaMarche		Like No Other	Honor	
2016	Laura Amy Schlitz		The Hired Girl	Winner	
2016	Kathy Kacer		Stones on a Grave	Honor	
2016	Suzanne Nelson		Serendipity's Footsteps	Honor	
2016	Emily Franklin		Last Night at the Circle Cinema	Notable	
2016	Deborah Hopkinson		Courage and Defiance: Stories of Spies, Saboteurs, and Survivors in World War II Denmark	Notable	
2016	Carol Solomon		Imagining Katherine	Notable	
2016	Annika Thor		Deep Sea	Notable	
2017	Gavriel Savit		Anna and the Swallow Man	Winner	
2018	Antonio Iturbe		The Librarian of Auschwitz	Winner	
2018	Kathy Kacer with Jordana Lebowitz		To Look a Nazi in the Eye: A Teen's Account of a War Criminal Trial	Honor	
2018	Marianne Kaurin		Almost Autumn	Honor	
2018	Katherine Locke		The Girl With the Red Balloon	Honor	
2018	Viktor E. Frankl		Man's Search for Meaning: Young Reader Edition	Notable	
2018	Pamela L. Laskin		Ronit & Jamil	Notable	
2018	L. B. Schulman		Stolen Secrets	Notable	
2019	Vesper Stamper		What the Night Sings	Winner	
2019	Rachel Lynn Solomon		You'll Miss Me When I'm Gone	Honor	
2019	Jennifer Nielsen		Resistance	Notable	
2020	Rachel DeWoskin		Someday We Will Fly	Winner	
2020	Victoria Ortiz		Dissenter on the Bench: Ruth Bader Ginsburg's Life and Work	Honor	
2020	Hannah Moskowitz		Sick Kids in Love	Honor	
2020	Susan Kaplan Carlton		In the Neighborhood of True	Notable	
2020	Albert Marrin		A Light in the Darkness: Janusz Korczak, His Orphans, and the Holocaust	Notable	
2021	Tyler Feder	Tyler Feder	Dancing at the Pity Party	Winner	
2021	Monica Hesse		They Went Left	Honor	
2021	Rachel Lynn Solomon		Today Tonight Tomorrow	Notable	
2021	Adam Eli		The New Queer Conscience	Notable	
2021	Gavriel Savit		The Way Back	Notable	
2021	Liza Wiemer		The Assignment	Notable	
2022	Aden Polydoros		The City Beautiful	Winner	
2022	Leah Scheier		The Last Words We Said	Honor	
2022	E. Lockhart	Manuel Preitano	Whistle: A New Gotham City Hero	Honor	
2022	Hannah Reynolds		The Summer of Lost Letters	Honor	
2022	Judy Batalion		The Light of Days: The Untold Story of Women Resistance Fighters in Hitler's Ghettos (Young Readers’ Edition)	Notable	
2022	Kimberly Jones and Gilly Segal		Why We Fly	Notable	
2022	Judith Pransky		The Seventh Handmaiden	Notable	
2022	Robbie Waisman and Susan McClelland		Boy From Buchenwald	Notable	
2023	Sacha Lamb		When the Angels Left the Old Country	Winner	
2023	Jennieke Cohen		My Fine Fellow: A Delicious Entanglement	Honor	
2023	Sarah Darer Littman		Some Kind of Hate	Honor	
2023	Hannah Reynolds		Eight Nights of Flirting	Honor	
2023	Barbara Krasner		Ethel's Song: Ethel Rosenberg's Life in Poems	Notable	
2023	R. M. Romero		The Ghosts of Rose Hill	Notable	
2024	Elana K. Arnold		The Blood Years	Winner	
2024	Neal Shusterman	Andrés Vera Martínez	Courage to Dream: Tales of Hope in the Holocaust	Honor	
2024	Dahlia Adler		Going Bicoastal	Honor	
2024	Steve Sheinkin		Impossible Escape: A True Story of Survival and Heroism in Nazi Europe	Honor	
2024	Aden Polydoros		Wrath Becomes Her	Honor	
2025	A .R. Vishny		Night Owls	Winner	
2025	Sacha Lamb		The Forbidden Book	Honor	
2025	Cambria Gordon		Trajectory	Honor	
2025	Edith Eva Eger with Esme Schwall and Jordan Engle		The Ballerina of Auschwitz	Notable	
2025	Suzy Zail		Inkflower	Notable	

=== All Ages (2009–2010) ===
Award recipients
Year	Author	Illustrator	Book	Result	Ref.
2009	Esther Takac	Anna Pignataro	Genesis -- The Book with Seventy Faces: A Guide for the Family	Notable	
2009	Rebecca Edid Ruzansky	Roberto Zeballos-Peralta	Celebrating with Jewish Crafts	Notable	
2010	Ellen Frankel	Avi Katz	JPS Illustrated Children's Bible	Notable	

=== Manuscript Award (1985–present) ===
Sydney Taylor Manuscript Award Winners
Award Year	Title	Published Title	Author	Publisher	Publication Year
2022	Echo of Light		Noah Weisz		
2021	Cats and Honey Cake		Sonja Spear		
2019	A Corner of the World		Jessica Littman		
2018	The Seventh Handmaiden		Judith Pransky		
2016	Honey and Me		Meira Drazin		
2015	Viva, Rose		Susan Krawitz		
2013	Freestyle		Karen Propp		
2011	In Search of Lottie		Susan A. Ross		
2010	On the Run		Joan Schoettler		
2009	When the Hurricane Came to New Orleans	When the Hurricane Came	Nechama Liss-Levinson		2012
2008	Stealing the Show		Margaret Chaiken		
2007	Getting Rid of Jeremy		Yael Mermelstein		
2004	Cara's Kitchen	Julia's Kitchen	Brenda A. Ferber	Farrar, Straus & Giroux	2006
2002	A Pickpocket's Tale	A Pickpocket's Tale	Karen Schwabach	Random House	2006
1999	Zayda Was a Cowboy	Zayda Was a Cowboy	June E. Nislick	Jewish Publication Society	2005
1998	Devorah	The Night of the Burning: Devorah's Story	Linda Press Wulfe	Farrar, Straus & Giroux	2006
1997	When the Soldiers Were Gone	When the Soldiers Were Gone	Vera W. Propp	G.P. Putnam's Sons	1999
1997	All Star Brothers	All Star Season	Tovah S. Yavin	Kar-Ben	2006
1996	Passover Promise		Donna Brown Agins		
1995	After I Said No		Sheila Golburgh Johnson		
1994	Of Heroes, Hooks and Heirlooms	Of Heroes, Hooks and Heirlooms	Faye Silton	Jewish Publication Society	1996
1993	The Treasure in the Tiny Blue Tin	The Treasure in the Tiny Blue Tin	Lilian Fox Ducharme	Texas Christian University Press	1998
1991	Garden of the Gentle Giant		David Meir-Levi		
1991	Leaving Egypt		Lois Roisman		
1991	Tamar's Cat		Aviva Cantor		
1990	Rabbi Aaron's Treasure	Reb Aharon's Treasure	Hannah Bandes	Targum/Feldheim	1993
1990	Operation Dewey	Operation Dewey	Dr. Kirby Rogers		2002
1988	Borders		Suzi Wizowaty		
1987	The Streets Are Paved with Gold	The Streets Are Paved with Gold	Frances Weissenberg	Harbinger House	1990
1986	Cubs of the Lion of Judah		Elaine Soloway		
1985	Spirit		Rosalie Fleisher		

=== Body-of-Work Award ===
Body-of-Work Award Winners
Year	Category
2020	Lesléa Newman
2022	Jane Yolen
2020	Lesléa Newman
2018	Harold Grinspoon and PJ Library
2004	Eric Kimmel
2002	Judye Groner and Madeline Wikler
1997	Barbara Diamond Goldin
1989	Yaffa Ganz
1984	Miriam Chaikin
1981	Barbara Cohen
1980	Sadie Rose Weilerstein
1979	Marilyn Hirsh
1978	Sydney Taylor's All-of-a-Kind Family
1972	Molly Cone
1971	Isaac Bashevis Singer
