= Korngold (surname) =

Korngold is a German surname. Notable people with the surname include:

- Julius Korngold (1860–1945), Austrian music critic
- Ralph Korngold (1882–1964), Polish-born author and businessman
- Erich Wolfgang Korngold (1897–1957), Austrian film composer
- George Korngold (1928–1987), Austrian record producer
- Jamie Korngold, American female rabbi
