= Michelle Edwards =

Michelle Edwards may refer to:

- Michelle Edwards (basketball) (born 1966), American retired basketball player
- Michelle Edwards (hurdler) (born 1969), British hurdler
- Michelle Claire Edwards (born 1974), badminton player from South Africa
- Michele Roosevelt Edwards, American businesswoman
- Michelle Edwards (writer), American writer and illustrator
