= Julie Baer =

American author and illustrator (born 1960)

- Born: October 5, 1960 (age 64); New Brunswick, New Jersey, U.S.
- Education: New School University (BA, 1983); Harvard University (MEd); Northeastern University (EdD)
- Spouse: Tim Bancroft (m. 1988)
- Children: 2

Website
- juliebaer.com

Julie C. Baer (born October 15, 1960) is an American author and visual artist.

== Early life and education ==
Julie Baer was born in New Brunswick, New Jersey on October 5, 1960 to David and Bette (née Loebel) Baer.

Baer attended Rhode Island School of Design from 1978 to 1980, then received a Bachelor of Arts from New School University in 1983. She later earned a Master of Education from the Harvard Graduate School of Education and a Doctor of Education from Northeastern University.

== Career ==
Baer published her debut children's book, I Only Like What I Like, with Bollix Books in 2003. That year, the book was a Sydney Taylor Book Award honor book for picture book.

Baer's second book, Love Me Later, was published with Bollix Books in 2005. It was selected as a notable book for the Sydney Taylor Book Award that year.

As of 2025, Baer teaches English at Northeastern University.

== Personal life ==
Baer married Tim Bancroft on September 18, 1988. The couple have two children.

Baer is Jewish.

== Publications ==
- I Only Like What I Like. Bollix Books. 2003. ISBN 978-1-932-18800-4.
- Love Me Later. Bollix Books. 2005. ISBN 978-1-932-18803-5.
