= Beyond the High White Wall =

1986 novel for children by Nancy Pitt

- Book cover
- Author: Nancy Pitt
- Illustrator: Ted Lewin
- Language: English
- Genre: children's literature historical fiction
- Set in: 1903-4, Ukraine
- Publisher: Charles Scribner's Sons
- Publication date: 1986
- Publication place: New York
- Pages: 135
- Awards: Sydney Taylor Book Award
- ISBN: 0-684-18663-2

Beyond the High White Wall is a 1986 children's historical novel by Nancy Pitt. It won the Sydney Taylor Book Award, which recognizes the best in Jewish children's literature. The book was published by Charles Scribner's Sons in New York, in the United States of America.

== Plot ==
The book is set in 1903-4 in a small town in Ukraine, which was at that time part of the Russian Empire. The narrator, 13-year-old Libby, who is Jewish, lives with her parents, grandmother, three sisters, a brother, and the cook and maid, with the "High White Wall" of the title around the family's house and garden. She sees a man being killed by a servant of the local baron. She discovers that she and her family cannot go to the police because they, as Jews, will be blamed, and that there is unlikely to be justice for the murdered man, because he is a peasant and the powerful can do what they want. When a neighbor's bakery is burned down, the law says that the owner must be imprisoned for ten days, again because he is Jewish.

The book includes other stories of the family's life and local and national events: the children trying to race trains; a group of hungry strangers who say they are refugees from Serbia; the children's attempts at art and drama; the death of the family's cook's small daughter from diphtheria; descriptions of food like kulebiaka; the start of the Russo-Japanese War in 1904; tales of their ancestors and their flight from a pogrom; riding in a troika.

When their house and business burn down, the family go into hiding because they are worried that they will be blamed. Eventually the fire is found to be arson by someone unknown, so they can come out of hiding. Their father, however, is imprisoned for ten days. After this, the family decide that they will be safer in America. They think that the fire was set by the murderer, who knows that they know what he did. At a party held by the baron, Libby confronts the murderer, who admits the killing and that he has stolen from the baron, his master. The baron overhears this; the murderer escapes on a horse but is thrown from the horse and killed. Despite this ending to the crime, the family know that they will still be safer in America. "The murder and the burning of our house forced us, like gypsy fortune-tellers, to read our future, and we were warned." They set off for New London, Connecticut, where they have relatives.

Pitt based the book on family history recorded by her aunt, to whom the book is dedicated.

== Reception ==
The novel was described by Frances Povsic as "poignant ... gripping". Povsic wrote that "In this convincing story the experiences of one Jewish family blend into a larger historic context, revealing the extent of anti-Semitism in turn-of-the-century Ukraine".

Publishers Weekly called it "a richly evocative first novel", and said "This is not, at its core, a dramatic book; it's a sharply focused look at the effects of one incident on a family, and a compassionate story of growing up".

The Bulletin of the Center for Children's Books said that some episodes of the book "seem more like vivid short stories than integral parts of a novel. Yet the smooth writing is a binding force, the tone of personal memoir convincing, and the sense of history as individual experience indelibly portrayed".

== Awards ==
The book won the Sydney Taylor Book Award for 1986, given by the Association of Jewish Libraries.
