= Deborah Bodin Cohen =

American writer (born 1968)

Deborah Bodin Cohen is an American writer and rabbi. Among other honors, she won a 2025 Sydney Taylor Book Award.

Cohen was born in 1968, in Columbia, Maryland. She received a Bachelor of Arts in English from the University of Michigan. In 1997, she was ordained at Hebrew Union College.

Cohen is married and has at least one child.

== Awards ==
Awards for Cohen's writing
Year	Work	Award	Result	Ref.
2006	Seventh Day	Sydney Taylor Book Award for Picture Book	Notable	
2006	Lilith's Ark	National Jewish Book Award for Family Literature	Winner	
2007	Lilith's Ark	Sydney Taylor Book Award for Teen Reader	Notable	
2008	Papa Jethro	Sydney Taylor Book Award for Picture Book	Notable	
2009	Engineer Ari and the Rosh Hashanah Ride	Sydney Taylor Book Award for Picture Book	Honor	
2010	Nachshon, Who Was Afraid to Swim	Sydney Taylor Book Award for Picture Book	Honor	
2011	Engineer Air and the Sukkah Express	Sydney Taylor Book Award for Picture Book	Notable	
2025	An Etrog from Across the Sea	Sydney Taylor Book Award for Picture Book	Winner	

== Publications ==
=== Picture books ===
==== Engineer Ari books ====
- Cohen, Deborah Bodin (2008). Engineer Ari and the Rosh Hashanah Ride. Illustrated by Shahar Kober. Minneapolis: Lerner Publishing Group. ISBN 978-0-8225-8650-0.
- Cohen, Deborah Bodin (2010). Engineer Ari and the Sukkah Express. Illustrated by Shahar Kober. Minneapolis: Kar-Ben Publishing. ISBN 978-0-761-35126-9.
- Cohen, Deborah Bodin (2011). Engineer Ari and the Hanukkah Mishap. Illustrated by Shahar Kober. Minneapolis: Kar-Ben Publishing. ISBN 978-0-761-35146-7.
- Cohen, Deborah Bodin (2015). Engineer Ari and the Passover Rush. Illustrated by Shahar Kober. Minneapolis: Kar-Ben Publishing. ISBN 978-1-467-73470-7.
- Cohen, Deborah Bodin (2017). Engineer Arielle and the Israel Independence Day Surprise. Illustrated by Yael Kimhi Orrelle. Minneapolis: Kar-Ben Publishing. ISBN 978-1-512-42095-1.

==== Standalone books ====
- Cohen, Deborah Bodin (2005). The Seventh Day: A Shabbat Story. Illustrated by Melanie Hall. Minneapolis: Kar-Ben Pub. ISBN 978-1-580-13125-4.
- Cohen, Deborah Bodin (2007). Papa Jethro. Illustrated by Jane Dippold. Minneapolis: Kar-Ben Pub. ISBN 978-1-580-13252-7.
- Cohen, Deborah Bodin (2009). Nachshon, Who Was Afraid to Swim: A Passover Story. Illustrated by Jago. Kar-Ben Pub. ISBN 978-0-822-58764-4.
- Olitzky, Kerry M.; Cohen, Deborah Bodin (2023). An Invitation to Passover. Illustrated by Mariia Kolker. Moosic: Kalaniot Books. ISBN 979-8-9863965-0-7. OCLC 1345221874.
- Olitzky, Kerry M.; Cohen, Deborah Bodin (2023). The Sisters Z. Illustrated by Lena Tohoff. Bedazzled Ink Publishing Company. ISBN 978-1-960-37308-3.
- Cohen, Deborah Bodin; Cohen, Olitzky (2024). An Etrog from Across the Sea. Illustrated by Stacey Dressen-McQueen. Minneapolis: Kar-Ben Publishing. ISBN 979-8-7656-0449-6.
- Cohen, Deborah Bodin (2025). Avi the Ambulance Goes to the Beach. Illustrated by CB Decker. Apples & Honey Press. ISBN 978-1-681-15667-5.
- Cohen, Deborah Bodin; Olitzky, Kerry M. (2025). Claudia Said Sí!: The Story of Mexico's First Woman President. Illustrated by Carlos Velez Aguilera. Apples & Honey Press. ISBN 978-1-681-15713-9.
- Cohen, Deborah Bodin; Olitzky, Kerry M. (2025). Twist, Tumble, Triumph: The Story of Champion Gymnast Ágnes Keleti. Illustrated by Martina Peluso. Minneapolis: Kar-Ben Publishing. ISBN 979-8-7656-5275-6.
- Olitzky, Kerry M.; Cohen, Deborah Bodin (2025). Rembrandt Chooses a Queen. Illustrated by Cinzia Battistel. Apples & Honey Press. ISBN 978-1-681-15682-8.

=== Young adult books ===
- Cohen, Deborah Bodin (2006). Lilith's Ark: Teenage Tales of Biblical Women. Philadelphia: Jewish Publication Society. ISBN 978-0-8276-0833-7.

=== Other ===
- Olitzky, Kerry M.; Cohen, Deborah Bodin (2024). Heroes With Chutzpah: 101 True Tales of Jewish Trailblazers, Changemakers & Rebels. Ben Yehuda Press. ISBN 978-1-953-82961-0.
