= Carol Snyder =

American politician

Carol Snyder is an American former state legislator from Colorado. She represented Adams County from 1991 to 1998 in the Colorado House of Representatives as a Democrat.

She was born in Colorado and has lived in Denver her whole life. She graduated from the University of Denver. She worked as a paralegal and office admibistrator. She served as Adams County Public Trustee from 2007 until 2012.
