= Phyllis Shalant =

American writer

- Born: July 22, 1949 (age 77); Brooklyn, New York
- Occupation: educator
- Writing career
- Genre: children's scholastic books

Phyllis Shalant (born 1949) is an American writer of both fiction and non-fiction children's scholastic books.

== Biography ==
Born in Brooklyn, New York, Shalant has a B.A. from Brooklyn College, 1971 and an M.A. from Manhattanville College, 1997. She is currently a professor of children's writing at Manhattanville College in New York. She focuses on teaching creative writing to children and adults. Her debut work was The Rock Star, the Rooster, & Me, the Reporter.

Shalant focuses almost exclusively on pedagogical writing. She conducts writer's workshops intended specifically for elementary school age children.

Shalant discussed her background in education and her writing process in a 2000 interview with Donna Green of the New York Times.

== Awards ==
Shalant has received the following awards and recognition for her work:

- Texas Bluebonnet Award Master List, 1997, for Beware of Kissing Lizard Lips
- Florida Sunshine State Young Readers Award Master List, 1997, for The Great Eye
- "best book" citation from New York Public Library, 2000
- Washington Irving Children's Choice Honor Book, 2002, both for Bartleby of the Mighty Mississippi
- "best children's book" citation, Bank Street College of Education, 2002, for When Pirates Came to Brooklyn.

One of her works, “The Society of Super Secret Heroes” is a children's book intended for the 4th-6th grade level. Finch Mundy is the main character. He and his three best friends, Rajiv Shah, a magician, Kevin Chan an artist and Elliott Levenson, who loves to joke around. The once dormant "Thinking Cape", acquired by Finch in Kindergarten, takes on magical powers and purports to “turn ordinary mortals into extraordinary ones.” They embark on several “missions,” where the boys have to take on the class bullies, and help a new teacher make friends. The Thinking Cape guides the boys on how to approach these problems. The boys face a real test as superheroes when the Thinking Cape disappears.

== Selected works ==
- The Rock Star, The Rooster, & Me, Dutton Children's Books (New York, NY) 1990
- The Transformation of Faith Futterman, Dutton Children's Books (New York, NY) 1990
- Shalom, Geneva Peace, Dutton Children's Books (New York, NY) 1992
- Beware of Kissing Lizard Lips, Dutton Children's Books (New York, NY) 1995
- The Great Eye, Dutton Children's Books (New York, NY) 1996
- Bartleby of the Mighty Mississippi Guild Selection; New York Public Library 100 Best Books, 2000; Washington Irving Children's Choice Honor Book, 2002; Golden Sower Children's Choice Book Award nominee, 2002–2003
- Bartleby of the Big Bad Bayou Junior Library Guild Selection
- When Pirates Came to Brooklyn Best Books of 2002; Bank Street College of Education; Top 10 Books for Youth About Religion, Booklist
- The Society of Super Secret Heroes: The Great Cape Rescue
- Look What We've Brought You from Vietnam: Crafts, Games, Recipes, Stories and Other Cultural Activities from Vietnamese Americans, Silver Burdett Press, 1988.
- Look What We've Brought You from Korea: Crafts, Games, Recipes, Stories and Other Cultural Activities from Korean-Americans, Silver Burdett Press, 1994.
- Look What We've Brought You from India: Crafts, Games, Recipes, Stories and Other Cultural Activities from Indian Americans, Silver Burdett Press, 1997.
- Look What We've Brought You from the Caribbean: Crafts, Games, Recipes, Stories, and Other Cultural Activities, Silver Burdett Press, 1998.
- Look What We've Brought You from Mexico: Crafts, Games, Recipes, Stories and Other Cultural Activities from Mexican Americans, Silver Burdett Press, 1998.
- "Pinch-Hitting" to anthology, With All My Heart, With All My Mind, 2000
