= Cathy Goldberg Fishman =

American author

- Born: Cathy Goldberg; 1951 (age 73–74); Mesa, Arizona, USA
- Spouse: Steven Fishman
- Children: 2

Website
- cathygoldbergfishman.com

Cathy Goldberg Fishman (born 1951) is an American author. Five of Fishman's books have been selected as notable for the Sydney Taylor Book Award for Younger Readers: On Passove (1997), On Rosh Hashanah and Yom Kippur (1997), On Purim (2000), On Shabbat (2001), and On Sukkot and Simchat Torah (2007).

Cathy Goldberg was born in Mesa, Arizona in 1951. She received degrees from Lesley College and the University of Vermont.

Goldberg is married to Steven Fishman, with whom she has two children.

== Publications ==
- On Rosh Hashanah and Yom Kippur. Illustrated by Melanie Hall. Aladdin. 1997. ISBN 978-0-689-83892-7.
- On Hanukkah. Illustrated by Melanie Hall. Aladdin. 1998. ISBN 978-0-689-84579-6.
- On Passover. Illustrated by Melanie Hall. Atheneum. 2000. ISBN 978-0-689-83264-2.
- On Purim. Illustrated by Melanie Hall. Atheneum. 2000. ISBN 978-0-689-82392-3.
- On Shabbat. Illustrated by Melanie Hall. Atheneum. 2001.
- Soup. Illustrated by Ronnie Rooney. Children's Press. 2002. ISBN 978-0-516-26981-8.
- Car Wash Kid. Illustrated by Barry Gott. Children's Press. 2003. ISBN 978-0-516-27811-7.
- Passover. Illustrated by Jeni Reeves. Carolrhoda Books. 2006. ISBN 978-1-575-05695-1.
- On Sukkot And Simchat Torah. Illustrated by Melanie Hall. Kar-Ben Publishing. 2006. ISBN 978-1-580-13165-0.
- When Jackie and Hank Met. Illustrated by Mark Elliott. Marshall Cavendish Children. 2012. ISBN 978-0-761-46140-1.
- Winter Walk in the City. Illustrated by Melanie Hall. Familius. 2020. ISBN 978-1-641-70290-4.
- Spring Stroll in the City. Illustrated by Melanie Hall. Familius. 2021. ISBN 978-1-641-70439-7.
- Fall Frolic in the City. Illustrated by Melanie Hall. Familius. 2022. ISBN 978-1-641-70726-8.
- Summer Stroll in the City. Illustrated by Melanie Hall. Familius. 2022. ISBN 978-1-641-70650-6.
