= Tammar Stein =

American writer

Tammar Stein is an author of novels for young adults. Her novel Light Years has won awards including the Notable Children's Book of Jewish Content, ALA Best Books for Young Adults.

== Novels ==
- Light Years, Laurel Leaf (2008) ISBN 0-440-23902-8
- High Dive, Knopf (2011) ISBN 0-440-23903-6
- Kindred, Ember (2012) ISBN 0-375-85349-9
- Spoils, Knopf (2013) ISBN 0-375-97062-2

== See also ==
- Jewish literature
