= Elisa Boxer =

American writer

Elisa Boxer is an American journalist and author of children's non-fiction picture books.

Two of her books have been selected as Sydney Taylor Book Award honor books: Hidden Hope (2024) and The Tree of Life (2025). Hidden Hope was also a finalist for the 2024 Jane Addams Children's Book Award.

== Publications ==
- The Voice That Won the Vote: How One Woman's Words Made History. Illustrated by Vivien Mildenberger. Ann Arbor: Sleeping Bear Press. 2020. ISBN 978-1-5341-6673-8.
- A Seat at the Table: The Nancy Pelosi Story. Illustrated by Laura Freeman. New York: Crown Books for Young Readers. 2021. ISBN 978-0-593-37251-7. OCLC 1266386353.
- Covered in Color: Christo and Jeanne-Claude's Fabrics of Freedom. Illustrated by Susanna Chapman. New York: Abrams. 2022. ISBN 978-1-4197-5611-5.
- One Turtle's Last Straw: The Real-Life Rescue That Sparked a Sea Change. Illustrated by Marta Álvarez Miguéns. New York: Crown Books for Young Readers. 2022. ISBN 978-0-593-37248-7.
- Splash!: Ethelda Bleibtrey Makes Waves of Change. Illustrated by Elizabeth Baddeley. Ann Arbor: Sleeping Bear Press. 2022. ISBN 978-1-5341-1143-1.
- Hidden Hope: How a Toy and a Hero Saved Lives During the Holocaust. Illustrated by Amy June Bates. New York, NY: Abrams. 2023. ISBN 978-1-4197-5000-7.
- Beam of Light: The Story of the First White House Menorah. Illustrated by Sofia Moore. New York: Rocky Pond Books. 2024. ISBN 978-0-593-69818-1.
- Dear Younger Me: What 35 Trailblazing Women Wish They'd Known As Girls. Foreword by Gabby Giffords. Blue Ridge Summit: Rowman & Littlefield Publishers, Incorporated. 2024. ISBN 978-1-5381-7551-4.
- The Different Tree. Illustrated by Marieke Nelissen. Reycraft Books. 2024. ISBN 978-1-478-88220-6.
- Full Circle: Creation, Migration, and Coming Home. Illustrated by Vivian Mineker. Ann Arbor, MI: Sleeping Bear Press. 2024. ISBN 978-1-5341-1281-0.
- The Tree of Life: How a Holocaust Sapling Inspired the World. Illustrated by Alianna Rozentsveig. Rocky Pond Books. 2024. ISBN 978-0-593-61712-0.
- Pine Cone Regrown: How One Species Thrives After Fire. Illustrated by Kevin and Kristen Howdeshell. Ann Arbor: Sleeping Bear Press. 2025. ISBN 978-1-534-11296-4.
