= Our Eddie =

1969 children's book

- Author: Sulamith Ish-Kishor
- Language: English
- Genre: Children's literature
- Publisher: Knopf
- Publication date: 1969
- Publication place: United States

Our Eddie is a 1969 novel by Jewish American poet Sulamith Ish-kishor. Eddie Raphel, a 14-year-old Jewish boy, lives with his family in London and has a poor relationship with his overbearing father. After his father takes a position in New York City, Eddie's life begins to unravel. The book was selected by the American Library Association as a notable children's book in 1969, and the book earned a Newbery Honor in 1970.
