= Yevgenia Nayberg =

Yevgenia Nayberg (born Kyiv) is a Ukrainian painter, set and costume designer, book author and illustrator.

She was nominated for an Eisner Award .

== Life ==
Yevgenia Nayberg grew up in Kyiv. She graduated from The National School of Arts in 1996.

She was an illustrator for UkranimaFilm. She studied Theatre Design at Carnegie Mellon University, and California State University, Long Beach graduating with an MFA in 1998.

Yevgenia created set designs, costumes, and posters for over 40 theatrical productions.

In 2023, she designed Subway Car Art for the Metropolitan Transportation Authority.

She teaches at Fashion Institute of Technology. She lives in New York City.

== Works ==
- Nayberg, Yevgenia (2019). Anya's secret society (in Indonesian). Watertown, MA: Charlesbridge. ISBN 978-1-58089-830-0.
- Nayberg, Yevgenia (2021). Mona Lisa in New York. Prestel Junior. ISBN 9783791374451.
- Nayberg, Yevgenia (2022). I hate borsch!. Grand Rapids, Michigan: Eerdmans Books for Young Readers. ISBN 978-0-8028-5580-0.
- Nayberg, Yevgenia (2024). A party for Florine: Florine Stettheimer and me. New York: Neal Porter Books / Holiday House. ISBN 978-0-8234-5410-5.
- Nayberg, Yevgenia (2026). Chernobyl, life, and other disasters: a graphic memoir. New York: Neal Porter Books / Holiday House. ISBN 978-0-8234-6058-8.
- Nayberg, Yevgenia (2026). Another tongue. New York: Neal Porter Books / Holiday House. ISBN 978-0-8234-5964-3. OCLC 0.
