= Holly-Jane Rahlens =

American novelist

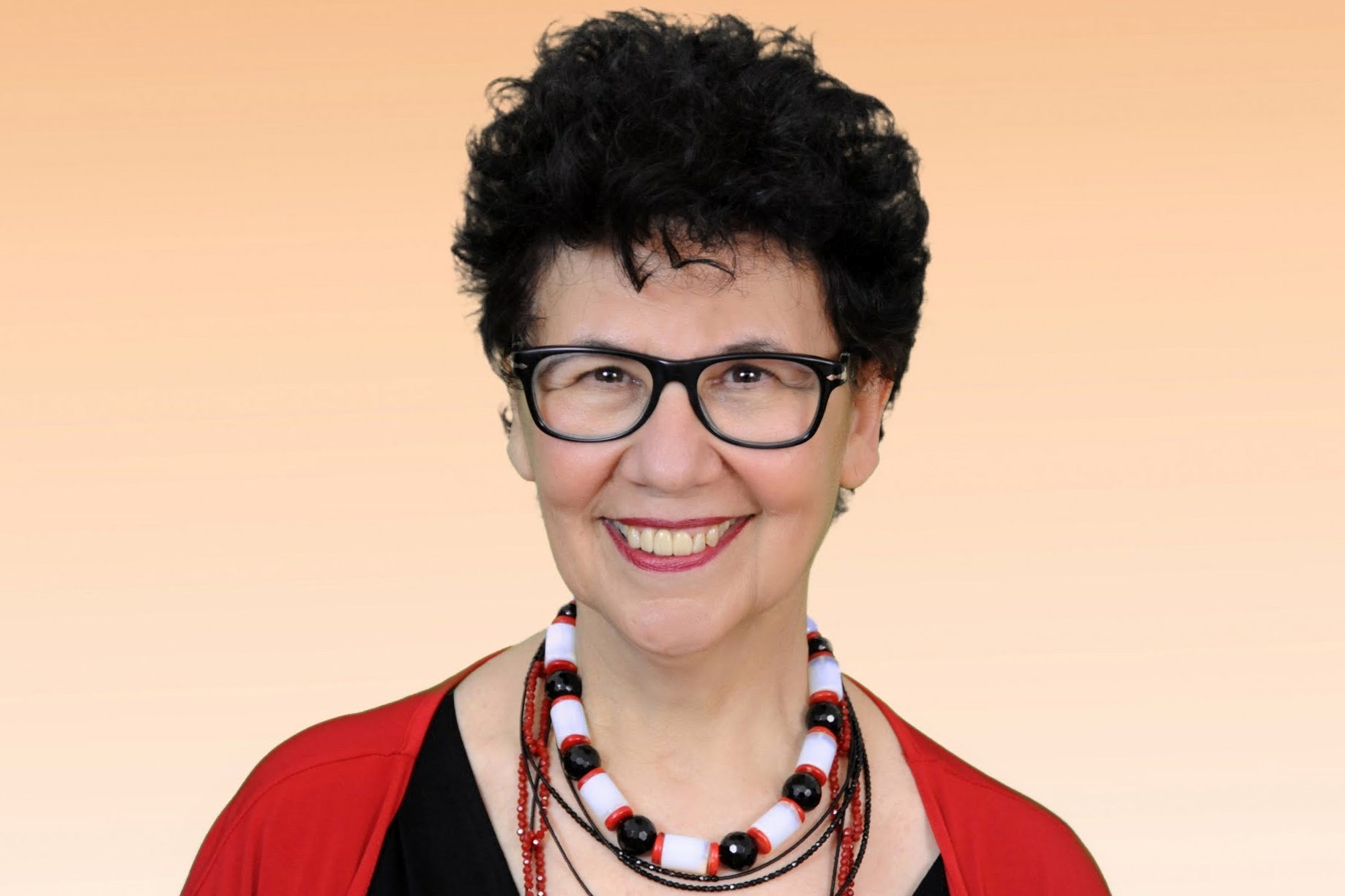
Rahlens 2016

Holly-Jane Rahlens (born 1950) is an American writer, journalist and entertainer living in Berlin, Germany. She is best known for her personal essays that were broadcast on German radio in the 1990s and performed for the stage, her “future fiction” novel Infinitissimo, written in English, but first published in German as Everlasting — Der Mann, der aus der Zeit fiel, and her award-winning coming-of-age novel, Prince William, Maximilian Minsky and Me, about a young Jewish girl living in today's Berlin.

== Life and career ==
Holly-Jane Rahlens, a born New Yorker, United States of America, grew up in Brooklyn and Queens and graduated from Queens College (City University of New York) where she studied Theater and English. She moved to Berlin, Germany, soon after, where she has lived virtually all her adult life. While remaining an American citizen, she has flourished in the German media world, working in radio, television, and film as an actress, producer, and commentator, and creating a series of highly praised one-woman shows. She writes fiction for readers of all ages.

In 2003 her first novel for teens, Prince William, Maximilian Minsky and Me, earned the prestigious Deutscher Jugendliteraturpreis as the best young adult novel published in Germany that year. The audio book, narrated by the author herself in German, was on the Preis der Deutschen Schallplattenkritik Best List in 2003. Soon after, the novel was published in its original English by Candlewick Press. In 2006 the Association of Jewish Libraries named it a Sydney Taylor Honor Book. It has since been translated into nine other languages and was adapted in 2007 into the motion picture Max Minsky and Me (screenplay: Holly-Jane Rahlens), which has garnered praise and awards around the world.

Published in 2022 in German, her book Future Fairy Tales. Geschichten aus einer anderen Welt includes ten fairy tales which are set in the distant future and bear the titles of tales once told by the Brothers Grimm. They are written in a variety of narrative styles and offer new perspectives on gender roles. This work is Rahlens' second nomination—and the first by the prize's youth jury—for the Deutscher Jugendliteraturpreis, which will be announced in October 2023 at the Frankfurt Book Fair.

== Major works ==
Screenplays:

- Eines schönen Tages, 1989
- Max Minsky and Me, 2007

Adult Novels:

- Becky Bernstein Goes Berlin, (1996 Piper Verlag, English: 1997 Arcade)
- Mazel Tov in Las Vegas (1997 Piper Verlag)

All-Age Books

- Mauerblümchen (2009, Rowohlt Verlag, English: Wallflower, 2010, Berlinica)
- Everlasting – Der Mann, der aus der Zeit fiel (2012, Wunderlich/Rowohlt, English: Infinitissimo – The Man Who Fell Through Time, 2017, Rowohlt/rororo)

Young Adult

- Prinz William, Maximilian Minsky und ich (2002, Rowohlt Verlag, English: Prince William, Maximilian Minsky and Me, 2005, Candlewick Press)
- Wie man richtig küsst (2005, Beltz & Gelberg, English: How to Really Kiss, 2007, Beltz & Gelberg)
- Mein kleines großes Leben (2008)
- Future Fairy Tales. Geschichten aus einer anderen Welt (2022, Rotfuchs, Hamburg)

Children's Books

- Stella Menzel und der goldene Faden (2013, Rowohlt Verlag)
- Blätterrauschen (2015, Rowohlt Verlag)
- Federflüstern (2016, Rowohlt Verlag)
