= Jane Breskin Zalben =

American children's literature author and illustrator

- Born: April 21, 1950 (age 76); New York City, New York, U.S.
- Education: Queens College, City University of New York
- Notable work: Book illustrations

Jane Breskin Zalben is an American author and illustrator of children's books and young adult books. She has written books about Jewish holidays, including ones featuring characters named Beni the Bear and Pearl the Lamb. Her 50th children's book, Hey, Mama Goose, was released in 2005.

Jane Breskin was born on April 21, 1950, in New York City to parents Mae Breskin (née Kirshbloom), a librarian, and Murry Breskin, an accountant. She began drawing at a young age, including taking her first art lessons at five years old at the Metropolitan Museum of Art. She went to the High School of Music and Art and graduated from Queens College with a B.A. in art in 1971. One of the teachers she studied under was Marvin Bileck, a children's book illustrator.

After college, Zalben worked at the Dial Press as an assistant in the art department. From 1971 to 1972, she attended graduate studies at the Pratt Institute Graphic Center.

Zalben's first book, a picture book titled Cecilia's Older Brother, was published in 1973. Her first young adult novel, Maybe It Will Rain Tomorrow, was published in 1982.

After moving with her family from Manhattan to Long Island in the 1980s, Zalben began writing and illustrating children's books about Jewish holidays, which would later include two series with animal characters named Beni and Pearl. She published the first of these books in 1988, with the picture book Beni's First Chanukah. The Beni series of books focuses on a family of bears and their celebrations of Jewish holidays. Her Pearl series includes a lamb character named Pearl and covers "less prominent Jewish traditions", such as the holiday Tu B'Shvat. She said she was inspired to write the books for her children, remarking in an interview with the Miami Jewish Tribune that she wanted to create and give her children "a gift... something they could cuddle up with during their holiday".

Her illustrations are often created using watercolor and pencil. According to The Oxford Encyclopedia of Children's Literature, her work is "characterized by a soft, cozy quality, and her texts often stress the importance of the family."

== Personal life ==
Zalben is Jewish. On December 25, 1969, she married Steve Zalben. She has two children, Alexander Zalben and Jonathan Zalben.

== Selected works ==
- Cecilia's Older Brother (1973)
- Norton's Nighttime (1979)
- Maybe It Will Rain Tomorrow (1982)
- The Walrus and the Carpenter (1986)
- Beni's First Chanukah (1988)
- Pearl Plants a Tree (1995)
- Unfinished Dreams (1996)
- Don’t Go! (2001)
- The Magic Menorah (2001)
- Hey, Mama Goose (2005), illustrated by Emilie Chollat
- A Moon for Moe and Mo (2018), illustrated by Mehrdokht Amini
