= Marisabina Russo =

American writer

- Born: Marisabina Stark; May 1, 1950 (age 76); New York City, U.S.
- Education: Mount Holyoke College (BA)
- Occupations: Author, illustrator
- Writing career
- Language: English
- Years active: 1986–present
- Genres: Children's literature, young adult fiction
- Notable works: The Line Up Book, Always Remember Me
- Notable awards: IRA Children’s Book Award, ALA Notable Book

Marisabina Russo (née Stark; born May 1, 1950) is a children's book author and illustrator. She has written and illustrated 32 books for children and young adults. Her most notable books include The Line Up Book (winner of the IRA Children’s Book Award) and Always Remember Me (an ALA Notable Book).

She was born in New York City and graduated from Mount Holyoke College with BA in Studio Art in 1971. She began her career as a freelance illustrator. Her work appeared frequently in The New Yorker and included several covers. She then went on to illustrate a book of poetry for children, Vacation Time by Nikki Giovanni. She started publishing her own stories with Greenwillow Books in 1986. Russo’s books come from her own childhood memories and her experiences as a mother. Her illustrations, painted in gouache, are colorful and two-dimensional, reminiscent of folk art. More recently, Russo has written young adult novels.

Her books have also been translated into Korean and Japanese. She has published with Greenwillow Books, Simon & Schuster, Random House, Roaring Brook Press and Harcourt, Brace. Her graphic memoir Why Is Everybody Yelling? Growing Up in My Immigrant Family was published by Macmillan Publishers in 2021.

== Bibliography ==
=== Children's books ===
- The Line Up Book (1986)
- Always Remember Me (2005)

=== Memoir ===
- Why Is Everybody Yelling? Growing Up in My Immigrant Family (2021)
