= Nancy Churnin =

American writer

Nancy Churnin is an American author and journalist. Churnin is a former theater critic for The Dallas Morning News and has published sixteen children's books as of February 2025.

== Early life ==
Churnin was born and raised in New York City. She received a bachelor's degree from Harvard University and an M.S. in journalism from Columbia University.

== Career ==
=== Journalism ===
Churnin worked as a theater critic for the San Diego edition of the Los Angeles Times from 1986 to 1992. In 2000, she joined the staff of The Dallas Morning News, writing about such topics as health, lifestyles, children's entertainment, and parenting. In January 2014, Churnin became the primary theater critic for The Dallas Morning News, a position she left in January 2019.

=== Children's books ===
Churnin's first picture book, The William Hoy Story: How a Deaf Baseball Player Changed the Game was published in 2016. Fifteen other children's books by Churnin were published between 2017 and 2024. Churnin's 17th book, A Teddy Bear for Emily―and President Roosevelt, Too will be published on March 6, 2025

== Personal life ==
Churnin met her husband, Michael Granberry, while they were both writing for the San Diego edition of the Los Angeles Times. They have three sons.

== Bibliography ==
Year	Title	Illustrator	Notes	Ref.
2016	The William Hoy Story: How a Deaf Baseball Player Changed the Game	Jez Tuya	A Spanish edition, La historia de William Hoy: Como un jugador sordo del beisbol cambió el juego was released in 2022.	
2017	Manjhi Moves a Mountain	Danny Popovici		
2018	Charlie Takes His Shot: How Charlie Sifford Broke the Color Barrier in Golf	John Joven		
2018	Irving Berlin: The Immigrant Boy Who Made America Sing	James Rey Sanchez		
2018	The Queen and the First Christmas Tree: Queen Charlotte's Gift to England	Luisa Uribe		
2019	Martin & Anne: The Kindred Spirits of Dr. Martin Luther King, Jr. and Anne Frank	Yevgenia Nayberg		
2020	Beautiful Shades of Brown: The Art of Laura Wheeler Waring	Felicia Marshall		
2020	For Spacious Skies: Katharine Lee Bates and the Inspiration for "America the Beautiful"	Olga Baumert		
2021	Dear Mr. Dickens	Bethany Stancliffe	Received a National Jewish Book Award and a Sydney Taylor Book Award.	
2021	A Queen to the Rescue: The Story of Henrietta Szold, Founder of Hadassah	Yevgenia Nayberg	Received a Sydney Taylor Book Award.	
2023	Lila and the Jack-o'-Lantern: Halloween Comes to America	Anneli Bray		
2023	Mama's Year with Cancer	Wazza Pink	By Nancy Churnin and Shayna Vincent	
2023	Counting on Shabbat	Petronela Dostalova	Board book	
2023	Valentines for All: Esther Howland Captures America's Heart	Monika Róza Wisniewska		
2024	Rainbow Allies: The True Story of Kids Who Stood against Hate	Izzy Evans		
2024	The Festival of Lights: 16 Hanukkah Stories		Compilation of stories by various authors, compiled and edited by Henry Herz. 288 pages	
