= Linda Glaser =

American children's book author

Linda Glaser (born 1949/1950) is an American children's book author. Her books often explore themes related to the environment, immigration, tolerance, and Judaism.

Glaser grew up in New York. She earned a master's degree in creative from San Francisco State University. Following graduation, she taught at Vista College.

She published her first book, Keep Your Socks On, Albert! with Dutton Books in 1992. She has since published over 30 children's books. She has won the Jane Addams Children's Book Award for Younger Children (2011), as well as the Sydney Taylor Book Award for Younger Readers (2013), among other honors. Glaser's Our Big Home (2000) was featured on the Reading Rainbow. The Association for Library Service to Children included the video on their 2003 list of Notable Children's Videos.

Glaser is married and has two children.

== Awards and honors ==
Emma's Poem is a Junior Library Guild book. In 1997, Smithsonian included The Borrowed Hanukkah Latkes on their year-end list of Notable Books for Children.

Awards for Glaser's works
Year	Work	Award	Result	Ref.
1997	The Borrowed Hanukkah Latkes	Sydney Taylor Book Award for Younger Readers	Notable	
2004	Mrs. Greenberg's Messy Hanukkah	Sydney Taylor Book Award for Younger Readers	Notable	
2006	Bridge to America	Sydney Taylor Book Award for Older Readers	Notable	
2011	Emma's Poem	Jane Addams Children's Book Award for Younger Children	Winner	
2011	Emma's Poem	Sydney Taylor Book Award for Younger Readers	Honor	
2013	Hannah's Way	Sydney Taylor Book Award for Younger Readers	Winner	
2017	On One Foot	Sydney Taylor Book Award for Younger Readers	Notable	

== Publications ==
- Keep Your Socks On, Albert!. Illustrated by Sally G. Ward. Dutton Books. 1992. ISBN 978-0-525-44838-9.
- Wonderful Worms. Illustrated by Loretta Krupinski. Millbrook. 1992. ISBN 978-1-562-94062-1.
- Stop That Garbage Truck!. Illustrated by Karen Lee Schmidt. Albert Whitman. 1993. ISBN 978-0-8075-7626-7.
- Tanya's Big Green Dream. Illustrated by Susan McGinnis. Simon & Schuster. 1994. ISBN 978-0-027-35994-7.
- Compost! Growing Gardens from Garbage. Illustrated by Anca Hariton. Millbrook. 1996. ISBN 978-0-761-30030-4.
- Rosie's Birthday Rat. Illustrated by Nancy Poydar. Delacorte Press. 1996. ISBN 978-0-385-32172-3.
- Beautiful Bats. Illustrated by Sharon Lane Holm. Millbrook. 1997. ISBN 978-0-761-30340-4.
- The Borrowed Hanukkah Latkes. Illustrated by Nancy Cote. Albert Whitman. 1997. ISBN 978-0-8075-0841-1. OCLC 36159557.
- Spectacular Spiders. Illustrated by Gay W. Holland. Millbrook. 1998. ISBN 978-0-761-30386-2.
- Fabulous Frogs. Illustrated by Loretta Krupinski. Millbrook. 1999. ISBN 978-0-761-30424-1.
- Magnificent Monarchs. Illustrated by Gay W. Holland. Millbrook. 2000. ISBN 978-0-761-31636-7.
- Our Big Home: An Earth Poem. Illustrated by Elisa Kleven. First Avenue Editions. 2000. ISBN 978-0-761-31776-0.
- Brilliant Bees. Illustrated by Gay W. Holland. Milbrook. 2000. ISBN 978-0-761-32670-0.
- It's Fall!. Illustrated by Susan Swan. First Avenue Editions. 2001. ISBN 978-0-761-31758-6.
- It's Winter!. Illustrated by Susan Swan. First Avenue Editions. 2002. ISBN 978-0-761-31759-3.
- It's Spring!. Illustrated by Susan Swan. First Avenue Editions. 2003. ISBN 978-0-761-31760-9.
- It's Summer!. Illustrated by Susan Swan. Brookfield Conn: First Avenue Editions. 2003. ISBN 978-0-7613-1757-9.
- Mrs. Greenberg's Messy Hanukkah. Illustrated by Nancy Cote. Albert Whitman & Co. 2004. ISBN 0-8075-5297-6.
- Bridge to America. Houghton Mifflin. 2005. ISBN 978-0-547-56205-6.
- Hello, Squirrels! Scampering Through the Seasons. Illustrated by Gay W. Holland. Millbrook. 2006. ISBN 978-0-761-32887-2.
- Dazzling Dragonflies. Illustrated by Mia Posada. Millbrook. 2008. ISBN 978-0-822-56753-0.
- Singing Crickets. Illustrated by Tess Feltes. Millbrook. 2009. ISBN 978-0-822-58806-1.
- Garbage Helps Our Garden Grow: A Compost Story. Illustrated by Shelley Rotner. Millbrook. 2010. ISBN 978-0-761-34911-2.
- Hoppy Hanukkah!. Illustrated by Claire A. Nivola. Clarion Books. 2010. ISBN 978-0-544-10508-9.
- Emma's Poem: The Voice of the Statue of Liberty. Illustrated by Claire A. Nivola. Clarion Books. 2010. ISBN 978-0-544-10508-9.
- Hoppy Passover!. Illustrated by Daniel Howarth. Albert Whitman. 2011. ISBN 978-0-8075-3380-2.
- Not a Buzz to be Found, Insects in Winter. Illustrated by Jaime Zollars. Scholastic. 2011. ISBN 978-0-545-56326-0.
- Stone Soup with Matzoh Balls: A Passover Tale in Chelm. Illustrated by Maryam Tabatabaei. Whitman. 2014. ISBN 978-0-8075-7620-5.
- Hannah's Way. Illustrated by Adam Gustavson. Kar-Ben Publishing. 2012. ISBN 978-0-761-35137-5.
- Bim! Sings the Baby: Baby's Shabbat Book. Illustrated by Estelle Corke. Albert Whitman. 2013. ISBN 978-0-8075-0747-6. OCLC 1039209700.
- On One Foot. Illustrated by Nuria Balaguer. Kar-Ben Publishing. 2016. ISBN 978-1-4677-7842-8.
- Kimmy's Marvelous Wind-Catching Wonder. Illustrated by Rachael Balsaitis. Redleaf Lane. 2017. ISBN 978-1-60554-436-6.
- Way Too Many Latkes: A Hanukkah in Chelm. Illustrated by Aleksandar Zolotic. Kar-Ben Publishing. 2017. ISBN 978-1-5124-2093-7.
- Yum! Says the Baby: Baby's Hanukkah Book. Illustrated by Estelle Corke. Albert Whitman. 2020. ISBN 978-0-8075-9213-7.
- Munch! Goes the Baby, Baby's Passover Book. Illustrated by Estelle Corke. Albert Whitman. 2021. ISBN 978-0-8075-9214-4.
