= Brenda A. Ferber =

American writer

- Born: April 23, 1967 (age 59); Skokie, Illinois
- Education: University of Michigan
- Occupation: Novelist
- Writing career
- Genre: Children's literature
- Notable work: Julia's Kitchen
- Notable awards: Sydney Taylor Manuscript Award; 2004 Cara's Kitchen Sydney Taylor Book Award; 2006 Julia's Kitchen
- Website: www.brendaferber.com

Brenda A. Ferber (born April 23, 1967) is an author of children's literature. She is an alumna of the University of Michigan. She won the Sydney Taylor Manuscript Award for her book Julia's Kitchen before it was published, and the Sydney Taylor Book Award following publication.

== Biography ==
Ferber was born Brenda Gail Aaronson in Skokie, Illinois, on April 23, 1967. She grew up in Highland Park, Illinois, where her father practiced medicine and her mother, an artist, taught art. In 1990, she married Alan D. Ferber, whom she had met in college.

Ferber discovered Judy Blume's books in elementary school and decided right then to become a children's book author, too—a dream that took some years to realize. After college and while raising three children, Brenda found being around kids and books reignited her old writing fantasy. She determined to give it a shot no matter how bad the odds of success were. When she took her first formal writing class, she had three toddlers at home. She hired a sitter so she could have a few precious hours each week in which to write.

She started out writing stories that were accepted by Ladybug magazine and several picture book manuscripts that collected 130 rejection letters over the course of three years. She immersed herself in children's fiction at the local library and decided she wanted to write novels that could touch a child's heart and soul and signed up for an advanced novel writing class to help push her to fulfill her dream.

In 2004, she submitted her first novel, then called Cara's Kitchen, to the Sydney Taylor Manuscript Competition, which she won. The manuscript was accepted for publication by Farrar Straus & Giroux, which published the book as Julia's Kitchen in 2006.

Ferber lives in Deerfield, Illinois, with her husband, three children, and a mini-whoodle named Ozzy.

== Bibliography ==
=== Julia's Kitchen ===
Julia's Kitchen is about eleven-year-old Cara Segal, who loses her mother and sister in a fire while spending the night at a friend's house. The book deals with Cara's struggles with her grief, her questions about God and Judaism, and how she copes with her father's withdrawal following the fire.

Julia's Kitchen has received several awards:

- Sydney Taylor Manuscript Award 2004 (as Cara's Kitchen)
- VOYA Top Shelf Fiction for Middle School Readers 2006
- Junior Library Guild Selection 2006
- Sydney Taylor Book Award Winner 2007
- Bank Street Best Children's Book of the Year 2007
- Children's Crown Collection (National Christian Schools Association) 2008-2009
- Alabama Children's Choice Book Award Master List
- Indiana Young Hoosier Award Master List
- Iowa Children's Choice Award Master List
- Kansas William Allen White Award Master List

The book received a starred review from Kirkus Reviews, and has been recommended by:

- Booklist
- Bulletin-Center Child Books
- Chicago Tribune
- Publishers Weekly
- School Library Journal

=== Jemma Hartman, Camper Extraordinaire ===
Released in 2009, Jemma Hartman, Camper Extraordinaire takes place at Camp Star Lake, a thinly veiled version of Camp Birch Knoll in Wisconsin, where Ferber attended summer camp. Jemma is looking forward to spending the summer with her best friend Tammy, but when Tammy shows up to camp with her cousin Brooke, all of Jemma's plans start to fall apart.

=== The Yuckiest, Stinkiest, Best Valentine's Day Ever ===
The Yuckiest, Stinkiest, Best Valentine's Day Ever is a picture book for younger readers, and is due out in 2012. In September 2009, it was announced that artist Tedd Arnold will be illustrating the book.

== Short stories ==
- "A Cheer for Charlie" - Ladybug, June 2006
- "The One with the Freckle" - Ladybug, September 2006
