= Jamie Korngold =

American Reform Jewish rabbi

Jamie Korngold is a Reform Jewish rabbi. In 2001, she founded the Adventure Rabbi program, a not-for-profit organization based in Boulder, Colorado which integrates spirituality and the outdoors. For example, people in the Adventure Rabbi program

...climb mountains, go skiing, play the guitar and sing around a campfire.

Rabbi Korngold is the spiritual leader of the Adventure Rabbi program, and envisioned it because she

experienced her most vibrant Jewish experiences in the outdoors. From scaling mountains to running ultra-marathons, she has found that the spirituality of the wilderness awakens Judaism.

She was ordained by Hebrew Union College-Jewish Institute of Religion, from which she holds a Master in Hebrew Letters. She also graduated from Cornell University with a B.S. in natural resources. In 2008 her book God in the Wilderness was published; it is about finding spiritual meaning in outdoor experiences. In 2011 her book The God Upgrade was published, which advocates modernizing the contemporary notion of God so that it becomes compatible with both science and Judaism. In 2011 she also published 9 children’s’ books including a book about Sukkot, titled Sadie's Sukkah Breakfast.

== Works ==
- God in the Wilderness: Rediscovering the Spirituality of the Great Outdoors with the Adventure Rabbi. Random House Digital, Inc. 2008. ISBN 978-0-385-52049-2.
- The God Upgrade: Finding Your 21st-Century Spirituality in Judaism's 5,000-Year-Old Tradition. Jewish Lights Publishing. 2011. ISBN 978-1-58023-443-6. "Jamie Korngold."
- Sadie's Sukkah Breakfast, Illustrator Julie Fortenberry, Lerner Pub Group, 2011, ISBN 978-0-7613-5648-6
