= Michelle Edwards (writer) =

American author and illustrator

Michelle Edwards is an American author and illustrator. Edwards won the 1992 National Jewish Book Award for Children's Picture Book. One of her books is a Sydney Taylor Book Award honor book, with three more named as honor books.

Edwards grew up in Troy, New York.

== Awards and honors ==
Four of Edwards's books are Junior Library Guild selections: Pa Lia's First Day (1999), Zero Grandparents (2001), Stinky Stern Forever (2005), and A Hat for Mrs. Goldman (2016). Some of Edwards's books have been included on lists of the year's best children's books, including Stinky Stern Forever (by The Bulletin of the Center for Children's Books, 2006), Room for the Baby (by Bank Street College of Education, 2013), A Hat for Mrs. Goldman (by Tablet, 2016; Bank Street College of Education, 2017), and Me and the Boss (by Bank Street College of Education, 2023). Bank Street College of Education named A Hat for Mrs. Goldman a book with "outstanding merit". In 2023, the Association for Library Service to Children included Me and the Boss among the year's Notable Children's Books.

Awards for Edwards's works
Year	Work	Award	Result	Ref.
1991	A Baker's Portrait	Sydney Taylor Book Award for Younger Readers	Notable	
1992	Chicken Man	National Jewish Book Award for Children's Picture Book	Winner	
1993	Blessed Are You	Sydney Taylor Book Award for Younger Readers	Notable	
2004	Papa's Latkes	Sydney Taylor Book Award for Younger Readers	Notable	
2006	Stinky Stern Forever	Gryphon Award	Winner	
2017	A Hat for Mrs. Goldman	Sydney Taylor Book Award for Younger Readers	Honor	
2023	Me and the Boss	Charlotte Zolotow Award	Winner	

== Publications ==
=== Jackson Friends books ===
- Edwards, Michelle (1999). Pa Lia’s First Day. Harcourt. ISBN 0-15-201974-X.
- Edwards, Michelle (2001). Zero Grandparents. Harcourt. ISBN 0-15-202083-7.
- Edwards, Michelle (2002). The Talent Show. Harcourt. ISBN 0-15-216403-0.
- Edwards, Michelle (2005). Stinky Stern Forever. Harcourt. ISBN 0-15-216389-1.

=== Standalone books ===
- Edwards, Michelle (1990). Dora's Book. First Avenue Editions. ISBN 0-87614-535-7.
- Edwards, Michelle (1991). A Baker's Portrait. Lothrop. ISBN 0-688-09713-8.
- Edwards, Michelle (1992). Alef-Bet: A Hebrew Alphabet Book. Lothrop, Lee and Shepard Books. ISBN 978-0-688-09724-0.
- Edwards, Michelle (1992). Chicken Man. HarperCollins. ISBN 978-1-588-38237-5.
- Edwards, Michelle (1993). Blessed Are You: Traditional Everyday Hebrew Prayers. Lothrop. ISBN 0-688-10760-5.
- Edwards, Michelle (1994). Eve and Smithy: An Iowa Tale. Lothrop. ISBN 0-688-11825-9.
- Edwards, Michelle (2002). What's that Noise?. Illustrated by Paul Meisel. Candlewick. ISBN 978-0-7636-1350-1.
- Edwards, Michelle (2004). Papa's Latkes. Illustrated by Stacey Schuett. Candlewick. ISBN 0-7636-0779-7.
- Edwards, Michelle (2010). The Hanukkah Trike. Illustrated by Kathryn Mitter. Albert Whitman. ISBN 978-0-80-753126-6.
- Edwards, Michelle (2012). Room for the Baby. Illustrated by Jana Christy. Albert Whitman. ISBN 978-0-375-87090-3.
- Edwards, Michelle (2014). Max Makes a Cake. Illustrated by Charles Santoso. Random. ISBN 978-0-449-81431-4.
- Edwards, Michelle (2016). A Hat for Mrs. Goldman: A Story About Knitting and Love. Illustrated by G. Brian Karas. Random. ISBN 978-0-553-49710-6.
- Edwards, Michelle (2022). Me and the Boss: A Story about Mending and Love. Illustrated by April Harrison. Narrated by Junior Nyong'o. Random. ISBN 978-0-593-31067-0.
