= Jane Addams Children's Book Award =

Annual literary award for children's books about peace and social equity

- Seal of the Jane Addams Children's Book Award
- Awarded for: Excellence in children's literature promoting peace, social justice, world community and equality
- Location: New York City
- Country: United States
- Presented by: Jane Addams Peace Association
- First award: 1953
- Website: http://www.janeaddamspeace.org/

The Jane Addams Children's Book Award is given annually to a children's book published the preceding year that advances the causes of peace and social equality. The awards have been presented annually since 1953. They were previously given jointly by the Women's International League for Peace and Freedom (WILPF) and the Jane Addams Peace Association, but are now presented solely by the Jane Addams Peace Association.

== History ==
The Jane Addams Children's Book Award was originally awarded to one book per year without categories. A Picture Book category was added in 1993; the award is currently given to two books annually, one for older children and one for younger children. In 2003, the time of year the award is given changed from September, honoring Jane Addams' birthday, to April, honoring the WILPF's birthday.

In the sixty-plus years of the award's history, there has been one public controversy over the selection of its winner. In 1970, the award was given to The Cay by Theodore Taylor, a book which became highly criticized in the years since its publication. In 1974, the current award chair, who was not the chair at the time the award was given to The Cay, publicly stated that she thought it was a mistake to have named The Cay an Addams Award winner. In response, Taylor, who saw the work as "a subtle plea for better race relations and more understanding", returned the Award "by choice, not in anger, but with troubling questions". In later years, Taylor reported that the Award had been rescinded. Even though The Cay remains on the list of Addams Award winners, Taylor's claim is widely thought to be true and has become a part of reading and discussing the book with young people today.

== Recipients ==
Between 1953 and 1992, only one award was presented per year, after which categories were added.

Award recipients, 1953–1992
| Year | Book | Author | Illustrator | Result |
|---|---|---|---|---|
| 1953 | People Are Important | Eva Knox Evans | — | Winner |
| 1954 | Stick-in-the-Mud | Jean Ketchum | — | Winner |
| 1955 | Rainbow Round the World | Elizabeth Yates | — | Winner |
| 1956 | Story of the Negro | Arna Bontemps | — | Winner |
| 1957 | Blue Mystery | Margot Benary-Isbert | — | Winner |
| 1958 | The Perilous Road | William O. Steele | — | Winner |
| 1959 | No Award Given | | | |
| 1960 | Champions of Peace | Edith Patterson Meyer | — | Winner |
| 1961 | What Then, Raman? | Shirley L. Arora | — | Winner |
| 1962 | The Road to Agra | Aimee Sommerfelt | — | Winner |
| 1963 | The Monkey and the Wild, Wild Wind | Ryerson Johnson | — | Winner |
| 1964 | Profiles in Courage: Young Readers Memorial Edition | John F. Kennedy | — | Winner |
| 1965 | Meeting with a Stranger | Duane Bradley | — | Winner |
| 1966 | Berries Goodman | Emily Cheney Neville | — | Winner |
| 1967 | Queenie Peavy | Robert Burch | — | Winner |
| 1968 | Little Fishes | Erik Christian Haugaard | — | Winner |
| 1969 | The Endless Steppe: Growing Up in Siberia | Esther Hautzig | — | Winner |
| 1970 | The Cay | Theodore Taylor | — | Winner |
| 1971 | Jane Addams: Pioneer of Social Justice | Cornelia Meigs | — | Winner |
| 1972 | The Tamarack Tree | Betty Underwood | — | Winner |
| 1973 | The Riddle of Racism | S. Carl Hirsch | — | Winner |
| 1973 | The Upstairs Roomm | Johanna Reiss | — | Honor |
| 1974 | Nilda | Nicholasa Mohr | — | Winner |
| 1974 | A Hero Ain't Nothin' but a Sandwich | Alice Childress | — | Honor |
| 1974 | Men Against War | Barbara Habenstreit | — | Honor |
| 1974 | A Pocket Full of Seeds | Marilyn Sachs | — | Honor |
| 1975 | The Princess and the Admiral | Charlotte Pomerantz | — | Winner |
| 1975 | The Eye of Conscience | Milton Meltzer and Bernard Cole | — | Honor |
| 1975 | My Brother Sam Is Dead | James Lincoln Collier and Christopher Collier | — | Honor |
| 1975 | Viva la Raza! | Elizabeth Sutherland Martinez and Enriqueta Longeaux y Vasquez | — | Honor |
| 1976 | Paul Robeson | Eloise Greenfield | — | Winner |
| 1976 | Dragonwings | Laurence Yep | — | Honor |
| 1976 | Song of the Trees | Mildred D. Taylor | — | Honor |
| 1976 | Z for Zachariah | Robert C. O'Brien | — | Honor |
| 1977 | Never to Forget: The Jews of the Holocaust | Milton Meltzer | — | Winner |
| 1977 | Roll of Thunder, Hear My Cry | Mildred D. Taylor | — | Honor |
| 1978 | Child of the Owl | Laurence Yep | — | Winner |
| 1978 | Alan and Naomi | Myron Levoy | — | Honor |
| 1978 | Mischling, Second Degree | Ilse Koehn | — | Honor |
| 1978 | Amifika | Lucille Clifton | — | Special Recognition |
| 1978 | The Wheel of King Asoka | Ashok Davar | — | Special Recognition |
| 1979 | Many Smokes, Many Moons: A Chronology of American Indian History through Indian Art | Jamake Highwater | — | Winner |
| 1979 | Escape to Freedom | Ossie Davis | — | Honor |
| 1979 | The Great Gilly Hopkins | Katherine Paterson | — | Honor |
| 1980 | The Road from Home | David Kherdian | — | Winner |
| 1980 | Woman from Hiroshima | Toshio Mori | — | West Coast Honor |
| 1980 | Natural History | M. B. Goffstein | — | Special Recognition |
| 1981 | First Woman in Congress: Jeannette Rankin | Florence Meiman White | — | Winner |
| 1981 | Chase Me, Catch Nobody! | Erik Christian Haugaard | — | Honor |
| 1981 | Doing Time: A Look at Crime and Prisons | Phyllis Clark and Robert Lehrman | — | Honor |
| 1981 | We Are Mesquakie, We Are One | Hadley Irwin | — | Honor |
| 1982 | A Spirit to Ride the Whirlwind | Athena V. Lord | — | Winner |
| 1982 | Let the Circle Be Unbroken | Mildred D. Taylor | — | Honor |
| 1982 | Lupita Mañana | Patricia Beatty | — | Honor |
| 1983 | Hiroshima No Pika | Toshi Maruki | — | Winner |
| 1983 | The Bomb | Sidney Lenz | — | Honor |
| 1983 | If I Had a Paka: Poems in Eleven Languages | Charlotte Pomerantz | Nancy Tafuri | Honor |
| 1983 | People at the Edge of the World: The Ohlone of Central California | Betty Morrow | — | West Coast Honor |
| 1983 | All the Colors of the Race | Arnold Adoff | — | Special Recognition |
| 1983 | Children as Teachers of Peace | Our Children | — | Special Recognition |
| 1984 | Rain of Fire | Marion Dane Bauer | — | Winner |
| 1985 | The Short Life of Sophie Scholl | Hermann Vinke, translated by Hedvig Pachter | — | Winner |
| 1985 | The Island on Bird Street | Uri Orlev, translated by Hillel Halkin | — | Honor |
| 1985 | Music, Music for Everyone | Vera B. Williams | Vera B. Williams | Honor |
| 1986 | Ain't Gonna Study War No More: The Story of America's Peace Seekers | Milton Meltzer | — | Winner |
| 1986 | Journey to the Soviet Union | Samantha Smith | — | Honor |
| 1987 | Nobody Wants a Nuclear War | Judith Vigna | — | Winner |
| 1987 | All in a Day | Mitsumasa Anno | Mitsumasa Anno | Honor |
| 1987 | Children of the Maya: A Guatemalan Indian Odyssey | Brent Ashabranner | Paul Conklin (photographs) | Honor |
| 1988 | Waiting for the Rain: A Novel of South Africa | Sheila Gordon | — | Winner |
| 1988 | Nicolas, Where Have You Been? | Leo Lionni | Leo Lionni | Honor |
| 1988 | Trouble at the Mines | Doreen Rappaport | Joan Sandin | Honor |
| 1989 | Anthony Burns: The Defeat and Triumph of a Fugitive Slave | Virginia Hamilton | — | Winner |
| 1989 | Looking Out | Victoria Boutis | — | Winner |
| 1989 | December Stillness | Mary Downing Hahn | — | Honor |
| 1989 | The Most Beautiful Place in the World | Ann Cameron | Thomas B. Allen | Honor |
| 1989 | Rescue: The Story of How Gentiles Saved Jews in the Holocaust | Milton Meltzer | — | Honor |
| 1990 | A Long Hard Journey: The Story of the Pullman Porter | Patricia C. McKissack and Fredrick McKissack | — | Winner |
| 1990 | Number the Stars | Lois Lowry | — | Honor |
| 1990 | Shades of Gray | Carolyn Reeder | — | Honor |
| 1990 | The Wednesday Surprise | Eve Bunting | Donald Carrick | Honor |
| 1991 | The Big Book for Peace | Ann Durell and Marilyn Sachs | — | Winner |
| 1991 | The Journey: Japanese-Americans, Racism and Renewal | Sheila Hamanaka | — | Honor |
| 1991 | The Middle of Somewhere: A Story of South Africa | Sheila Gordon | — | Honor |
| 1992 | Journey of the Sparrows | Fran Leeper Buss | — | Winner |
| 1992 | Now Is Your Time! The African-American Struggle for Freedom | Walter Dean Myers | — | Honor |

Starting in 1992, the award was separated into categories. From 1993 to 2005, there were two categories: Picture Book and Book for Older Children. Starting in 2005, the Picture Book categories was renamed as "Book for Younger Children". In 2024, both categories were renamed; "Book for Younger Children" became "Picture Book" again, and "Book for Older Children" became "Chapter Book".

Award recipients, 1993–present
| Year | Category | Book | Author | Illustrator | Result | Ref. |
|---|---|---|---|---|---|---|
| 1993 | Picture Book | Aunt Harriet's Underground Railroad in the Sky | Faith Ringgold | Faith Ringgold | Winner | |
| 1993 | Picture Book | Mrs. Katz and Tush | Patricia Polacco | Patricia Polacco | Honor | |
| 1993 | Book for Older Children | A Taste of Salt: A Story of Modern Haiti | Frances Temple | — | Winner | |
| 1993 | Book for Older Children | Letters from a Slave Girl: The Story of Harriet Jacobs | Mary E. Lyons | — | Honor | |
| 1994 | Picture Book | This Land Is My Land | George Littlechild | George Littlechild | Winner | |
| 1994 | Picture Book | Soul Looks Back in Wonder | Tom Feelings | Tom Feelings | Honor | |
| 1994 | Book for Older Children | Freedom's Children: Young Civil Rights Activists Tell Their Stories | Ellen Levine | — | Winner | |
| 1994 | Book for Older Children | Eleanor Roosevelt: A Life of Discovery | Russell Freedman | — | Honor | |
| 1995 | Picture Book | Sitti's Secrets | Naomi Shihab Nye | Nancy Carpenter | Honor | |
| 1995 | Picture Book | Bein' with You This Way written | W. Nikola-Lisa | Michael Bryant | Honor | |
| 1995 | Book for Older Children | Kids at Work: Lewis Hine and the Crusade Against Child Labor | Russell Freedman | — | Winner | |
| 1995 | Book for Older Children | Cézanne Pinto | Mary Stolz | — | Honor | |
| 1995 | Book for Older Children | I Hadn't Meant to Tell You This | Jacqueline Woodson | — | Honor | |
| 1996 | Picture Book | No Award Given | | | | |
| 1996 | Book for Older Children | The Well | Mildred D. Taylor | — | Winner | |
| 1996 | Book for Older Children | From the Notebooks of Melanin Sun | Jacqueline Woodson | — | Honor | |
| 1996 | Book for Older Children | On the Wings of Peace: Writers and Illustrators Speak Out for Peace in Memory of Hiroshima and Nagasaki | — | — | Honor | |
| 1996 | Book for Older Children | The Watsons Go to Birmingham – 1963 | Christopher Paul Curtis | — | Honor | |
| 1996 | | The Middle Passage | Tom Feelings | — | Special Commendation | |
| 1997 | Picture Book | Wilma Unlimited | Kathleen Krull | David Diaz | Winner | |
| 1997 | Picture Book | The Day Gogo Went to Vote | Elinor Batezat Sisulu | Sharon Wilson | Honor | |
| 1997 | Book for Older Children | Growing Up In Coal County | Susan Campbell Bartoletti | — | Winner | |
| 1997 | Book for Older Children | Behind the Bedroom Wall | Laura E. Williams | — | Honor | |
| 1997 | Book for Older Children | Second Daughter: The Story of a Slave Girl | Mildred Pitts Walter | — | Honor | |
| 1998 | Picture Book | Seven Brave Women | Betsy Hearne | Bethanne Andersen | Winner | |
| 1998 | Picture Book | Celebrating Families | Rosmarie Hausherr | Rosmarie Hausherr | Honor | |
| 1998 | Picture Book | Passage to Freedom: The Sugihara Story | Ken Mochizuki | Dom Lee | Honor | |
| 1998 | Book for Older Children | Habibi | Naomi Shihab Nye | — | Winner | |
| 1998 | Book for Older Children | The Circuit: Stories from the Life of a Migrant Child | Francisco Jimenez | — | Honor | |
| 1998 | Book for Older Children | Seedfolks | Paul Fleischman | — | Honor | |
| 1999 | Picture Book | Painted Words / Spoken Memories: Marianthe's Story | Aliki Brandenberg | Aliki Brandenberg | Winner | |
| 1999 | Picture Book | Hey, Little Ant | Phillip Hoose and Hannah Hoose | Debbie Tilley | Honor | |
| 1999 | Picture Book | i see the rhythm | Toyomi Igus | Michele Wood | Honor | |
| 1999 | Picture Book | This Land Is Your Land | Woody Guthrie | Kathy Jakobsen | Honor | |
| 1999 | Book for Older Children | Bat 6 | Virginia Euwer Wolff | — | Winner | |
| 1999 | Book for Older Children | The Heart of a Chief | Joseph Bruchac | — | Honor | |
| 1999 | Book for Older Children | No More Strangers Now | Tim McKee | Anne Blackshaw (photographs) | Honor | |
| 1999 | Book for Older Children | Restless Spirit: The Life and Work of Dorothea Lange | Elizabeth Partridge | — | Honor | |
| 2000 | Picture Book | Molly Bannaky | Alice McGill | Chris K. Soentpiet | Winner | |
| 2000 | Picture Book | A Band of Angels: A Story Inspired written by the Jubilee Singers | Deborah Hopkinson | Raúl Colón | Honor | |
| 2000 | Picture Book | When Sophie Gets Angry -- Really, Really Angry... | Molly Bang | Molly Bang | Honor | |
| 2000 | Book for Older Children | Through My Eyes | Ruby Bridges | — | Winner | |
| 2000 | Book for Older Children | The Birchbark House | Louise Erdrich | — | Honor | |
| 2000 | Book for Older Children | Kids on Strike! | Susan Campbell Bartoletti | — | Honor | |
| 2001 | Picture Book | The Composition | Antonio Skármeta | Alfonso Ruano | Winner | |
| 2001 | Picture Book | The Yellow Star: The Legend of King Christian X of Denmark | Carmen Agra Deedy | Henri Sorensen | Honor | |
| 2001 | Book for Older Children | Esperanza Rising | Pam Muñoz Ryan | — | Winner | |
| 2001 | Book for Older Children | The Color of My Words | Lynn Joseph | — | Honor | |
| 2001 | Book for Older Children | Darkness over Denmark: The Danish Resistance and the Rescue of the Jews | Ellen Levine | — | Honor | |
| 2001 | Book for Older Children | Walking to the Bus-Rider Blues | Harriette Gillem Robinet | — | Honor | |
| 2002 | Picture Book | Martin's Big Words: The Life of Dr. Martin Luther King, Jr. | Doreen Rappaport | Bryan Collier | Winner | |
| 2002 | Picture Book | Amber Was Brave, Essie Was Smart | Vera B. Williams | Vera B. Williams | Honor | |
| 2002 | Book for Older Children | The Other Side of Truth | Beverley Naidoo | — | Winner | |
| 2002 | Book for Older Children | A Group of One | Rachna Gilmore | — | Honor | |
| 2002 | Book for Older Children | True Believer | Virginia Euwer Wolff | — | Honor | |
| 2003 | Picture Book | Patrol: An American Soldier in Vietnam | Walter Dean Myers | Ann Grifalconi | Winner | |
| 2003 | Picture Book | ¡Si, Se Puede! Yes We Can! Janitor Strike In L.A. | Diana Cohn | Francisco Delgado | Honor | |
| 2003 | Picture Book | The Village That Vanished | Ann Grifalconi | Kadir Nelson | Honor | |
| 2003 | Book for Older Children | Parvana's Journey | Deborah Ellis | — | Winner | |
| 2003 | Book for Older Children | The Same Stuff as Stars | Katherine Paterson | — | Honor | |
| 2003 | Book for Older Children | When My Name Was Keoko | Linda Sue Park | — | Honor | |
| 2004 | Picture Book | Harvesting Hope: The Story of Cesar Chavez | Kathleen Krull | Yuyi Morales | Winner | |
| 2004 | Picture Book | Girl Wonder: A Baseball Story in Nine Innings | Deborah Hopkinson | Terry Wideners | Honor | |
| 2004 | Picture Book | Luba: The Angel of Bergen-Belsen | Luba Tryszynska-Frederick | Ann Marshall | Honor | |
| 2004 | Book for Older Children | Out of Bounds: Seven Stories of Conflict and Hope | Beverley Naidoo | — | Winner | |
| 2004 | Book for Older Children | Getting Away with Murder: The True Story of the Emmett Till Case | Chris Crowe | — | Honor | |
| 2004 | Book for Older Children | Shutting Out the Sky: Life in the Tenements of New York 1880-1924 | Deborah Hopkinson | — | Honor | |
| 2004 | | The Breadwinner Trilogy | Deborah Ellis | — | Special Commendation | |
| 2005 | Book for Younger Children | Sélavi, That is Life: A Haitian Story of Hope | Youme Landowne | Youme Landowne | Winner | |
| 2005 | Book for Younger Children | Hot Day on Abbott Avenue | Karen English Karen English (author) | Javaka Steptoe | Honor | |
| 2005 | Book for Younger Children | Henry and the Kite Dragon | Bruce Edward Hall | William Low | Honor | |
| 2005 | Book for Younger Children | Sequoyah: The Cherokee Man Who Gave His People Writing | James Rumford, translation into Cherokee by Anna Sixkiller Huckaby | — | Honor | |
| 2005 | Book for Older Children | With Courage and Cloth: Winning the Fight for a Woman's Right to Vote | Ann Bausum | — | Winner | |
| 2005 | Book for Older Children | The Heaven Shop | Deborah Ellis | — | Honor | |
| 2006 | Book for Younger Children | Delivering Justice: W. W. Law and the Fight for Civil Rights | James Haskins | Benny Andrews | Winner | |
| 2006 | Book for Younger Children | Poems to Dream Together=Poemas Para Soñar Juntos | Francisco X. Alarcón | Paula Barragán | Honor | |
| 2006 | Book for Older Children | Let Me Play: The Story of Title IX, the Law that Changed the Future of Girls in America | Karen Blumenthal | — | Winner | |
| 2006 | Book for Older Children | The Crazy Man | Pamela Porter | — | Honor | |
| 2006 | Book for Older Children | Sweetgrass Basket | Marlene Carvell | — | Honor | |
| 2007 | Book for Younger Children | A Place Where Sunflowers Grow | Amy Lee-Tai | Felicia Hoshino | Winner | |
| 2007 | Book for Younger Children | Night Boat to Freedom | Margot Theis Raven | E. B. Lewis | Honor | |
| 2007 | Book for Younger Children | Crossing Bok Chitto | Tim Tingle | Jeanne Rorex Bridges | Honor | |
| 2007 | Book for Older Children | Weedflower | Cynthia Kadohata | — | Winner | |
| 2007 | Book for Older Children | Freedom Walkers | Russell Freedman | — | Honor | |
| 2007 | Book for Older Children | Counting on Grace | Elizabeth Winthrop | — | Honor | |
| 2008 | Book for Younger Children | The Escape of Oney Judge: Martha Washington's Slave Finds Freedom | Emily Arnold McCully | Emily Arnold McCully | Winner | |
| 2008 | Book for Younger Children | One Thousand Tracings: Healing the Wounds of World War II | Lita Judge | Lita Judge | Honor | |
| 2008 | Book for Older Children | We Are One: The Story of Bayard Rustin | Larry Dane Brimner | — | Winner | |
| 2008 | Book for Older Children | Rickshaw Girl | Mitali Perkins | Jamie Hogan | Honor | |
| 2008 | Book for Older Children | Elijah of Buxton | Christopher Paul Curtis | — | Honor | |
| 2008 | Book for Older Children | Birmingham, 1963 | Carole Boston Weatherford | — | Honor | |
| 2009 | Book for Younger Children | Planting the Trees of Kenya: The Story of Wangari Maathai | Claire A. Nivola | Claire A. Nivola | Winner | |
| 2009 | Book for Younger Children | The Storyteller's Candle/La velita de los cuentos | Lucia M. Gonzalez | Lulu Delacre | Honor | |
| 2009 | Book for Younger Children | Silent Music: A Story of Baghdad | James Rumford | James Rumford | Honor | |
| 2009 | Book for Older Children | The Surrender Tree: Poems of Cuba's Struggle for Freedom | Margarita Engle | — | Winner | |
| 2009 | Book for Older Children | The Shepherd's Granddaughter | Anne Laurel Carter | — | Honor | |
| 2009 | Book for Older Children | Ain't Nothing But a Man: My Quest to Find the Real John Henry | Scott Reynolds Nelson with Marc Aronson | — | Honor | |
| 2010 | Book for Younger Children | Nasreen's Secret School: A True Story from Afghanistan | Jeanette Winter | Jeanette Winter | Winner | |
| 2010 | Book for Younger Children | Sojourner Truth's Step-Stomp Stride | Andrea Davis Pinkney | Brian Pinkney | Honor | |
| 2010 | Book for Younger Children | You and Me and Home Sweet Home | George Ella Lyon | Stephanie Anderson | Honor | |
| 2010 | Book for Older Children | Marching for Freedom: Walk Together, Children, and Don't You Grow Weary | Elizabeth Partridge | — | Winner | |
| 2010 | Book for Older Children | Almost Astronauts: 13 Women Who Dared to Dream | Tanya Lee Stone | — | Honor | |
| 2010 | Book for Older Children | Claudette Colvin | Phillip Hoose | — | Honor | |
| 2011 | Book for Younger Children | Emma's Poem: The Voice of the Statue of Liberty | Linda Glaser | Claire A. Nivola | Winner | |
| 2011 | Book for Younger Children | Sit-In: How Four Friends Stood Up by Sitting Down | Andrea Davis Pinkney | Brian Pinkney | Honor | |
| 2011 | Book for Younger Children | Ruth and the Green Book | Calvin Alexander Ramsey with Gwen Strauss | Floyd Cooper | Honor | |
| 2011 | Book for Older Children | A Long Walk to Water | Linda Sue Park | — | Winner | |
| 2011 | Book for Older Children | The Ninth Ward | Jewell Parker Rhodes | — | Honor | |
| 2011 | Book for Older Children | Birmingham Sunday | Larry Dane Brimner | — | Honor | |
| 2012 | Book for Younger Children | The Mangrove Tree: Planting Trees to Feed Families | Susan L. Roth and Cindy Trumbore | Susan L. Roth | Winner | |
| 2012 | Book for Younger Children | Peaceful Pieces: Poems and Quilts about Peace | Anna Grossnickle Hines | Anna Grossnickle Hines | Honor | |
| 2012 | Book for Younger Children | Belle, the Last Mule at Gee's Bend | Calvin Alexander Ramsey and Bettye Strouds | John Holyfield | Honor | |
| 2012 | Book for Older Children | Sylvia & Aki | Winifred Conkling | — | Winner | |
| 2012 | Book for Older Children | Heart and Soul: The Story of America and African Americans | Kadir Nelson | Kadir Nelson | Honor | |
| 2012 | Book for Older Children | Inside Out & Back Again | Thanhha Lai | — | Honor | |
| 2013 | Book for Younger Children | Each Kindness | Jacqueline Woodson | E. B. Lewis | Winner | |
| 2013 | Book for Younger Children | Dolores Huerta: A Hero to Migrant Workers | Sarah Warren | Robert Casilla | Honor | |
| 2013 | Book for Younger Children | We March | Shane W. Evans | Shane W. Evans | Honor | |
| 2013 | Book for Older Children | We've Got a Job: The 1963 Birmingham Children's March | Cynthia Levinson | — | Winner | |
| 2013 | Book for Older Children | Marching to the Mountaintop: How Poverty, Labor Fights and Civil Rights Set the Stage for Martin Luther King Jr's Final Hours | Ann Bausum | — | Honor | |
| 2013 | Book for Older Children | Temple Grandin: How the Girl Who Loved Cows Embraced Autism and Changed the World | Sy Montgomery | — | Honor | |
| 2014 | Book for Younger Children | Brave Girl: Clara and the Shirtwaist Makers' Strike of 1909 | Michelle Markel | Melissa Sweet | Winner | |
| 2014 | Book for Younger Children | We Shall Overcome: The Story of a Song | Debbie Levy | Vanessa Brantley-Newton | Honor | |
| 2014 | Book for Younger Children | Razia's Ray of Hope: One Girl's Dream of an Education | Elizabeth Suneby | Suana Verelst | Honor | |
| 2014 | Book for Older Children | Sugar | Jewell Parker Rhodes | — | Winner | |
| 2014 | Book for Older Children | Seeing Red | Kathryn Erskine | — | Honor | |
| 2014 | Book for Older Children | Brotherhood | Anne Westrick | — | Honor | |
| 2015 | Book for Younger Children | Separate is Never Equal: Sylvia Mendez and her family's fight for desegregation | Duncan Tonatiuh | Duncan Tonatiuh | Winner | |
| 2015 | Book for Younger Children | Whispering Town | Jennifer Elvgren | Fabio Santomauro | Honor | |
| 2015 | Book for Younger Children | Shooting at the Stars: The Christmas Truce of 1914 | John Hendrix | John Hendrix | Honor | |
| 2015 | Book for Older Children | The Girl From the Tar Paper School: Barbara Rose Johns and the advent of the Civil Rights Movement | Teri Kanefield | — | Winner | |
| 2015 | Book for Older Children | Revolution | Deborah Wiles | — | Honor | |
| 2015 | Book for Older Children | Silver People: Voices from the Panama Canal | Margarita Engle | — | Honor | |
| 2016 | Book for Younger Children | New Shoes | Susan Lynn Meyer | Eric Velásquez | Winner | |
| 2016 | Book for Younger Children | Lillian's Right to Vote: A Celebration of the Voting Rights Act of 1965 | Jonah Winter | Shane W. Evans | Honor | |
| 2016 | Book for Younger Children | Mama's Nightingale: A Story of Immigration and Separation | Edwidge Danticat | Leslie Staub | Honor | |
| 2016 | Book for Older Children | Turning 15 on the Road to Freedom: My Story of the 1965 Selma Voting Rights March | Lynda Blackmon Lowery | P.J. Loughran | Winner | |
| 2016 | Book for Older Children | Full Cicada Moon | Marilyn Hilton | — | Honor | |
| 2017 | Book for Younger Children | Steamboat School | Deborah Hopkinson | Ron Husband | Winner | |
| 2017 | Book for Younger Children | First Step: How One Girl Put Segregation on Trial | Susan E. Goodman | E. B. Lewis | Honor | |
| 2017 | Book for Younger Children | I Dissent: Ruth Bader Ginsburg Makes Her Mark | Debbie Levy | Elizabeth Baddeley | Honor | |
| 2017 | Book for Older Children | Sachiko: A Nagasaki Bomb Survivor's Story | Caren B. Stelson | — | Winner | |
| 2017 | Book for Older Children | We Will Not Be Silent: The White Rose Student Resistance Movement That Defied Adolf Hitler | Russell Freedman | — | Honor | |
| 2017 | Book for Older Children | Wolf Hollow | Lauren Wolk | — | Honor | |
| 2018 | Book for Younger Children | Malala's Magic Pencil | Malala Yousafzai | Kerascoët | Winner | |
| 2018 | Book for Younger Children | Before She Was Harriet | Lesa Cline-Ransome | James Ransome | Honor | |
| 2018 | Book for Older Children | The Enemy: Detroit 1954 | Sara E. Holbrook | Stephanie Dalton Cowan | Winner | |
| 2018 | Book for Older Children | Fred Korematsu Speaks Up | Laura Atkins and Stan Yogi | Yutaka Houlette | Honor | |
| 2018 | Book for Older Children | Midnight Without A Moon | Linda Williams Jackson | — | Honor | |
| 2018 | Book for Older Children | Piecing Me Together | Renée Watson | — | Honor | |
| 2019 | Book for Younger Children | The Day You Begin | Jacqueline Woodson | Rafael López | Winner | |
| 2019 | Book for Younger Children | The Day War Came | Nicola Davies | Rebecca Cobb | Honor | |
| 2019 | Book for Younger Children | Julián is a Mermaid | Jessica Love | Jessica Love | Honor | |
| 2019 | Book for Older Children | Ghost Boys | Jewell Parker Rhodes | — | Winner | |
| 2019 | Book for Older Children | The Night Diary | Veera Hiranandani | — | Honor | |
| 2019 | Book for Older Children | We Rise, We Resist, We Raise Our Voices | Wade Hudson and Cheryl Willis Hudson (editors) | — | Honor | |
| 2020 | | No Awards Given | | | | |
| 2021 | Book for Younger Children | We Are Water Protectors | Carole Lindstrom | Michaela Goade | Winner | |
| 2021 | Book for Younger Children | Ocean Speaks: How Marie Tharp Revealed The Ocean's Biggest Secret | Jess Keating | Katie Hickey | Honor | |
| 2021 | Book for Younger Children | Black Is a Rainbow Color | Angela Joy | Ekua Holmes | Honor | |
| 2021 | Book for Older Children | A Wish in the Dark | Christina Soontornvat | — | Winner | |
| 2021 | Book for Older Children | Land of the Cranes | Aida Salazar | — | Honor | |
| 2021 | Book for Older Children | Finish the Fight | Veronica Chambers and the staff of The New York Times | — | Honor | |
| 2022 | Book for Younger Children | Shirley Chisholm Dared: The Story of the First Black Woman in Congress | Alicia D. Williams | April Harrison | Winner | |
| 2022 | Book for Younger Children | Runaway: The Daring Escape of Ona Judge | Ray Anthony Shepard | Keith Mallett | Honor | |
| 2022 | Book for Younger Children | Unspeakable: The Tulsa Race Massacre | Carole Boston Weatherford | Floyd Cooper | Honor | |
| 2022 | Book for Older Children | How to Find What You're Not Looking For | Veera Hiranandani | — | Winner | |
| 2022 | Book for Older Children | Rez Dogs | Joseph Bruchac | — | Honor | |
| 2022 | Book for Older Children | Strong as Fire, Fierce as Flame | Supriya Kelkar | — | Honor | |
| 2023 | Book for Younger Children | Choosing Brave: How Mamie Till-Mobley and Emmett Till Sparked the Civil Rights Movement | Angela Joy | Janelle Washington | Winner | |
| 2023 | Book for Younger Children | Ida B. Wells, Voice of Truth: Educator, Feminist, and Anti-Lynching Civil Rights Leader | Michelle Duster | Laura Freeman | Honor | |
| 2023 | Book for Younger Children | Sanctuary: Kip Tiernan and Rosie's Place, the Nation's First Shelter for Women | Christine McDonnell | Victoria Tentler-Krylov | Honor | |
| 2023 | Book for Older Children | Undercover Latina | Aya de León | — | Winner | |
| 2023 | Book for Older Children | Swim Team | Johnnie Christmas | — | Honor | |
| 2023 | Book for Older Children | Yonder | Ali Standish | — | Honor | |
| 2024 | Picture Book | A Song for the Unsung: Bayard Rustin, the Man Behind the 1963 March on Washington | Carole Boston Weatherford and Rob Sanders | Byron McCray | Winner | |
| 2024 | Picture Book | The Artivist | Nikkolas Smith | Nikkolas Smith | Honor | |
| 2024 | Picture Book | That Flag | Tameka Fryer Brown | Nikkolas Smith | Honor | |
| 2024 | Chapter Book | The Lost Year: A Survival Story of the Ukrainian Famine (National Book Award Finalist) | Katherine Marsh | — | Winner | |
| 2024 | Chapter Book | Mascot | Charles Waters and Traci Sorell | — | Honor | |
| 2024 | Chapter Book | World Made of Glass | Ami Polonsky | — | Honor | |
| 2025 | Picture Book | They Call Me Teach: Lessons in Freedom | Lesa Cline-Ransome | James Ransome | Winner | |
| 2025 | Picture Book | Small Shoes, Great Strides: How Three Brave Girls Opened Doors to School Equality | Vaunda Micheaux Nelson | Alex Bostic | Honor | |
| 2025 | Picture Book | A Map for Falasteen: A Palestinian Child's Search for Home | Maysa Odeh | Aliaa Betawi | Honor | |
| 2025 | Chapter Book | Not Nothing | Gayle Forman | — | Winner | |
| 2025 | Chapter Book | Safiyyah's War | Hiba Noor Khan | — | Honor | |
| 2025 | Chapter Book | Black Star | Kwame Alexander | — | Honor | |
| 2026 | Picture Book | The History of We | Nikkolas Smith | Nikkolas Smith | Winner | |
| 2026 | Picture Book | A Line Can Go Anywhere: The Brilliant, Resilient Life of Artist Ruth Asawa | Caroline McAlister | Jamie Green | Honor | |
| 2026 | Picture Book | A Place for Us: A Story in Pictures | James Ransome | James Ransome | Honor | |
| 2026 | Chapter Book | A Sea of Lemon Trees: The Corrido of Robert Alvarez | María Dolores Águila | — | Winner | |
| 2026 | Chapter Book | How the Word Is Passed: Remembering Slavery and How It Shaped America | Sonja Cherry-Paul (adaptor) Clint Smith (author) | — | Honor | |
| 2026 | Chapter Book | The Incredibly Human Henson Blayze | Derrick Barnes | — | Honor | |
