= James Ransome (illustrator) =

American illustrator (born 1961)

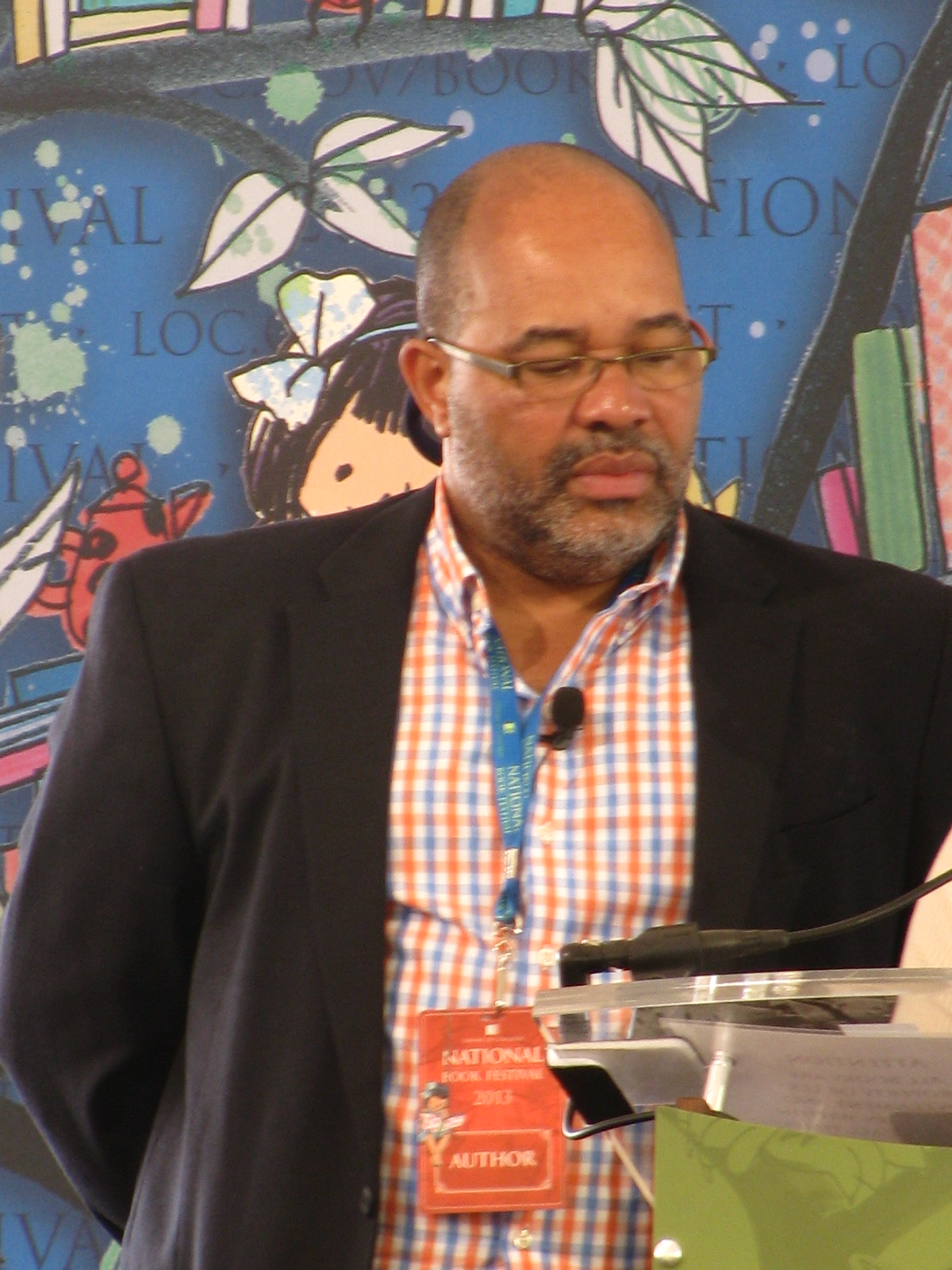
- Born: September 25, 1961 (age 64); Rich Square, North Carolina, U.S.
- Education: BA
- Alma mater: Pratt Institute
- Occupation: Illustrator
- Spouse: Lesa Cline-Ransome
- Children: 4
- Writing career
- Language: English
- Years active: 1993–present
- Genre: Picture books
- Notable work: Before She Was Harriet
- Notable awards: NAACP Image Award (1999); Children's Literature Legacy Award (2023)
- Website: jamesransome.com//

James E. Ransome (born September 25, 1961) is an American illustrator of over 60 children's books. He has also illustrated greetings cards and magazines, and has been commissioned for murals, including three for the National Underground Railroad Freedom Center in Cincinnati, Ohio.

Although Ransome was born in North Carolina, the family moved to Bergenfield, New Jersey while he was in high school. While there, he attended film making and photography classes, which influenced his style. He obtained a Bachelor of Fine Arts degree from Pratt Institute in Brooklyn, New York, where his mentor was the illustrator Jerry Pinkney.

Ransome is an associate professor in the School of Art at Syracuse University. He and his wife, author Lesa Cline-Ransome, and family live in Rhinebeck, New York.

== Selected awards and honors ==
Ransome's The Bell Rang (2019) is Junior Library Guild book. Additionally, 13 of the books Ransome has illustrated are Junior Library Guild books: Bimmi Finds a Cat (1997); The Christmas Tugboat (2012); Light in the Darkness (2013); Joltin’ Joe DiMaggio (2014); My Story, My Dance (2016); Before She Was Harriet (2018); Game Changers (2018); The Creation (2019); Gridiron (2020); Overground Railroad (2020); Hardcourt (2022); Sonny Rollins Plays the Bridge (2022); and The Story of the Saxophone (2023).

Before She Was Harriet was named one of the best books of 2017 by Booklist, the Center for the Study of Multicultural Children's Literature, the Chicago Public Library, and Kirkus Reviews. The following year, Booklist included it on their lists of the year's "Top 10 Diverse Picture Books" and "Top 10 Biographies for Youth".

The Bell Rang was named one of the best books of 2019 by the Center for the Study of Multicultural Children's Literature, Chicago Public Library, The Horn Book Magazine, and Kirkus Reviews. The following year, the National Council of Teachers of English included it on their Notable Poetry List.

In 2023, he was awarded the Children's Literature Legacy Award for his "significant and lasting contribution to literature for children."

Awards for books Ransome illustrated
Year	Title	Award	Result	Ref.
1994	Uncle Jed's Barbershop	Coretta Scott King Award for Illustrator	Honor	
1995	The Creation	Coretta Scott King Award for Illustrator	Winner	
1999	Let My People Go	NAACP Image Award for Outstanding Literary Work – Children	Winner	
2008	Young Pele	NAACP Image Award for Outstanding Literary Work – Children	Finalist	
2012	Before There Was Mozart	NAACP Image Award for Outstanding Literary Work – Children	Finalist	
2014	This is the Rope	Charlotte Zolotow Award	Honor	
2016	Granddaddy’s Turn	NAACP Image Award for Outstanding Literary Work – Children	Finalist	
2016	My Story, My Dance	Orbis Pictus Award	Recommended	
2018	Before She Was Harriet	Charlotte Zolotow Award	Honor	
2018	Before She Was Harriet	Christopher Award for Books for Children Ages 6 and up	Winner	
2018	Before She Was Harriet	Coretta Scott King Award for Illustrator	Honor	
2018	Before She Was Harriet	Jane Addams Children's Book Award for Younger Reader	Honor	
2018	Before She Was Harriet	Maryland Blue Crab Young Reader Award for Transitional Nonfiction	Honor	
2018	Before She Was Harriet	NAACP Image Award for Outstanding Literary Work – Children	Finalist	
2019	Game Changers	Orbis Pictus Award	Recommended	
2020	The Bell Rang	Coretta Scott King Award for Illustrator	Honor	
2023	Hardcourt	Orbis Pictus Award	Honor	
2023		Children's Literature Legacy Award	Winner	

== Publications ==
=== As author ===
- Gunner, Football Hero. Holiday House. 2010. ISBN 978-0-8234-2053-7.
- A Joyful Christmas: A Treasury of New and Classic Songs, Poems, and Stories for the Holiday (Henry Holt, 2010)
- New Red Bike!. Holiday House. 2011. ISBN 978-0-8234-2226-5.
- My Teacher (Dial Books, 2012)
- The Bell Rang. Caitlyn Dlouhy Books. 2019. ISBN 978-1-442-42113-4.

=== As illustrator ===
==== Picture Books ====
- Bandy, Michael S.; Stein, Eric (2015). Granddaddy's Turn: A Journey to the Ballot Box. Candlewick. ISBN 978-0-7636-6593-7.
- Bandy, Michael S.; Stein, Eric (2020). Northbound: A Train Ride Out of Segregation. Candlewick. ISBN 978-0-7636-9650-4.
- Bowen, Fred (2020). Gridiron: Stories From 100 Years of the National Football League. Margaret K. McElderry. ISBN 978-1-481-48112-0.
- Bowen, Fred (2022). Hardcourt: Stories from 75 Years of the National Basketball Association. Margaret K. McElderry. ISBN 978-1-534-46043-0.
- Bunting, Eve (1998). Your Move. Harcourt Children's Books. ISBN 978-0-15-200181-0.
- Bunting, Eve (2001). Peepers. Harcourt. ISBN 978-0-15-260297-0.
- Burton, Marilee Robin (1994). My Best Shoes. HarperCollins. ISBN 978-0-688-11756-6.
- Carr, Jan (1996). Dark Day, Light Night. Hyperion. ISBN 0-7868-0018-6.
- Cline-Ransome, Lesa (2002). Quilt Alphabet. Holiday House. ISBN 978-0-8234-1453-6.
- Cline-Ransome, Lesa (2002). Quilt Counting. Chronicle Books. ISBN 978-1-58717-177-2.
- Cline-Ransome, Lesa (2003). Major Taylor, Champion Cyclist. Atheneum. ISBN 978-0-689-83159-1.
- Cline-Ransome, Lesa (2003). Satchel Paige. Simon & Schuster Children's Publishing. ISBN 978-0-689-81151-7.
- Cline-Ransome, Lesa (2007). Young Pele: Soccer's First Star. Schwartz & Wade.
- Cline-Ransome, Lesa (2008). Helen Keller: The World in Her Heart. Collins Publishers.
- Cline-Ransome, Lesa (2011). Before There Was Mozart: The Story of Joseph Boulogne, Chevalier de Saint-George. Schwartz & Wade. ISBN 978-0-375-83600-8.
- Cline-Ransome, Lesa (2012). Words Set Me Free: The Story of Young Frederick Douglass. Simon & Schuster. ISBN 978-1-4169-5903-8.
- Cline-Ransome, Lesa (2013). Light in the Darkness: A Story about How Slaves Learned in Secret. Jump at the Sun. ISBN 978-1-423-13495-4.
- Cline-Ransome, Lesa (2014). Benny Goodman and Teddy Wilson: Taking the Stage as the First Black-and-White Jazz Band in History. Holiday House. ISBN 978-0-8234-2362-0.
- Cline-Ransome, Lesa (2015). Freedom's School. Paula Wiseman Books. ISBN 978-1-4231-6103-5.
- Cline-Ransome, Lesa; Battle, Robert (2015). My Story, My Dance: Robert Battle's Journey to Alvin Ailey. Paula Wiseman. ISBN 978-1-481-42221-5.
- Cline-Ransome, Lesa (2016). Just a Lucky So and So: The Story of Louis Armstrong. Holiday House. ISBN 978-0-8234-3428-2.
- Cline-Ransome, Lesa (2017). Before She Was Harriet. Holiday House. ISBN 978-0-823-42047-6.
- Cline-Ransome, Lesa (2017). Germs: Fact and Fiction, Friends and Foes. Ottaviano. ISBN 978-0-8050-7915-9.
- Cline-Ransome, Lesa. Germs: Sickness, Bad Breath, and Pizza (Henry Holt, 2017)
- Cline-Ransome, Lesa (2018). Game Changers: The Story of Venus and Serena Williams. Paula Wiseman Books. ISBN 978-1-4814-7684-3.
- Cline-Ransome, Lesa (2020). Overground Railroad. Holiday House. ISBN 978-0-823-43873-0.
- Cline-Ransome, Lesa (2023). The Story of the Saxophone. Holiday House. ISBN 978-0-823-43702-3.
- Cline-Ransome, Lesa (2024). Fighting with Love: The Legacy of John Lewis. Paula Wiseman. ISBN 978-1-5344-9662-0.
- Cook, Michelle (2009). Our Children Can Soar: A Celebration of Rosa, Barack, and the Pioneers of Change. Bloomsbury Children's. ISBN 978-1-599-90418-4.
- Feldman, Eve B. (1994). That Cat!. Tambourine Books. ISBN 978-0-688-13310-8.
- Flournoy, Vanessa; Flournoy, Valerie (1995). Celie and the Harvest Fiddler. HarperCollins. ISBN 0-688-11457-1.
- Golio, Gary (2021). Sonny Rollins Plays the Bridge. Nancy Paulsen. ISBN 978-1-984-81366-4.
- Hamilton, Virginia (2003). Bruh Rabbit and the Tar Baby Girl. Blue Sky Press. ISBN 978-0-590-47376-7.
- Hansen, Joyce; McGowan, Gary (2003). Freedom Roads: Searching for the Underground Railroad. Cricket Books. ISBN 978-0-8126-2673-5.
- Haskins, James; Benson, Kathleen (2001). Building a New Land: African Americans in Colonial America. Amistad. ISBN 978-0-688-10266-1.
- Hooks, William H. (1995). Freedom's Fruit. Knopf. ISBN 978-0-679-82438-1.
- Hopkinson, Deborah (1993). Sweet Clara and the Freedom Quilt. Alfred A. Knopf. ISBN 978-0-679-82311-7.
- Hopkinson, Deborah (2002). Under the Quilt of Night. Atheneum. ISBN 978-0-689-82227-8.
- Hopkinson, Deborah (2004). Sky Boys: How They Built the Empire State Building. Schwarz and Wade. ISBN 978-0-375-83610-7.
- Hort, Lenny (1997). How Many Stars in the Sky?. Reading Rainbow Books. ISBN 978-0-688-10103-9.
- Howard, Elizabeth Fitzgerald (2001). Aunt Flossie's Hats (and Crab Cakes Later). Clarion Books. ISBN 978-0-395-72077-6.
- Johnson, Angela (1993). The Girl Who Wore Snakes. Orchard Books. ISBN 978-0-531-05491-8.
- Johnson, Dinah (2000). Quinnie Blue. Henry Holt. ISBN 978-0-8050-4378-5.
- Johnson, James Weldon (2018). The Creation. Holiday House. ISBN 978-0-823-44025-2.
- Johnston, Tony (1996). The Wagon. Mulberry Books. ISBN 978-0-688-13457-0.
- Jordan, Deloris (2010). Baby Blessings: A Prayer for the Day You Are Born. Paula Wiseman. ISBN 978-1-4169-5362-3.
- Levine, Arthur A. (1991). All the Lights in the Night. HarperCollins. ISBN 978-0-688-10107-7.
- Matteson, George; Ursone, Adele (2012). The Christmas Tugboat: How the Rockefeller Center Christmas Tree Came to New York City. Clarion. ISBN 978-0-618-99215-7.
- McKissack, Patricia C. (1998). Let My People Go: Bible Stories Told by a Freeman of Color. Atheneum. ISBN 978-0-689-80856-2.
- McMorrow, T. E. (2017). The Nutcracker in Harlem. Harper. ISBN 978-0-06-117598-5.
- Medearis, Angela Shelf (1997). Rum-A-Tum-Tum. Holiday House. ISBN 978-0-8234-1143-6.
- Mitchell, Margaree King (1998). Uncle Jed's Barbershop. Aladdin. ISBN 978-0-689-81913-1.
- Mitchell, Margaree King (2012). When Grandmama Sings. HarperCollins. ISBN 978-0-688-17563-4.
- Nolen, Jerdine (2020). Freedom Bird: A Tale of Hope and Courage. Paula Wiseman. ISBN 978-0-689-87167-2.
- Nolen, Jerdine (2022). On Her Wings: The Story of Toni Morrison. Paula Wiseman. ISBN 978-1-5344-7852-7.
- Ogburn, Jacqueline K. (1998). The Jukebox Man. Dial. ISBN 978-0-8037-1429-8.
- Patrick, Denise Lewis (1993). Red Dancing Shoes. HarperCollins. ISBN 978-0-688-10392-7.
- Reneaux, J. J. (2001). How Animals Saved the People: Animal Tales from the South. HarperCollins. ISBN 978-0-688-16253-5.
- Rosen, Michael J. (1995). Bonsey and Isabel. Harcourt Children's Books. ISBN 978-0-15-209813-1.
- Eli and the Swamp Man, text by Charlotte Sherman (HarperCollins Publishers, 1996)
- Sherman, Charlotte (1996). Eli and the Swamp Man. HarperCollins. ISBN 978-0-060-24722-5.
- Shore, Diane Z.; Alexander, Jessica (2005). This Is the Dream. Amistad. ISBN 978-0-06-055519-1.
- San Souci, Robert D. (2000). The Secret of the Stones. Dial. ISBN 978-0-8037-1640-7.
- Stewart, Elisabeth J. (1996). Bimmi Finds a Cat. Clarion. ISBN 0395646529.
- Thomson, Sarah L. (2008). What Lincoln Said. HarperCollins. ISBN 978-0-06-084819-4.
- Turner, Ann (2015). My Name Is Truth: The Life of Sojourner Truth. HarperCollins. ISBN 978-0-06-075898-1.
- Washington, Donna L. (2003). A Pride of African Tales. Amistad. ISBN 978-0-06-024929-8.
- Weatherford, Carole Boston (2018). Be a King: Dr. Martin Luther King Jr.'s Dream and You. Bloomsbury USA (Children). ISBN 978-0-80-272368-0.
- Winter, Jonah (2014). Joltin' Joe DiMaggio. Atheneum. ISBN 978-1-416-94080-7.
- Wolff, Ferida (2005). It Is the Wind. HarperCollins. ISBN 0-06-028191-X.
- Woodson, Jacqueline (2001). Visiting Day. Scholastic. ISBN 978-0-590-40005-3.
- Woodson, Jacqueline (2013). This Is the Rope: A Story From the Great Migration. Nancy Paulson. ISBN 978-0-399-23986-1.
- Zolotow, Charlotte (1995). The Old Dog. HarperCollins. ISBN 978-0-06-024409-5.

==== Middle Grade ====
- Cline-Ransome, Lesa (2018). "Next". In Hudson, Wade; Hudson, Cheryl Willis (eds.). We Rise, We Resist, We Raise Our Voices. Crown Books for Young Readers. ISBN 978-0-525-58042-3.
