= Waiting for the Rain =

Waiting for the Rain may refer to:

- Waiting for the Rain (novel), a 1987 novel by Sheila Gordon
- Waiting for the Rain (album), a 1985 album by Hugh Masekela
