= Wendy Anderson Halperin =

American illustrator and author

Wendy Anderson Halperin (born April 10, 1952) is an American illustrator and author of children's books.

== Biography ==
=== Education ===
Halperin was born on April 10, 1952, in Joliet, Illinois. She attended Syracuse University, 1971–72; Pratt Institute, 1973–74; California College of Arts and Crafts, 1979–80; and American Academy (Chicago, IL), 1982–83.

=== Career ===
Halperin has illustrated more than two dozen books by others and has written or adapted several others herself.

A number of Halperin's books have received starred reviews from Publishers Weekly and Booklist. These include: Homeplace (Orchard Books, 1995), Once upon a Company (Orchard Books, 1998), The Full Belly Bowl (Atheneum, 1998), Bonaparte (Doring Kindersley, 2000), Let's Go Home: Some Wonderful Things about a House (Simon & Schuster, 2000), The Secret Remedy Book: A Story of Comfort and Love (Orchard Books, 2003), Strawberry Hill (Little, Brown, 2009), Planting the Wild Garden (Peachtree Publishers, 2011), and Love Is... (Simon & Schuster, 2013).

Her book The Lampfish of Twill (Orchard Books, 1991) was a New York Times Notable Book, as was Hunting the White Cow (Orchard Books, 1993).

She created an education program called Drawn to Discover that focuses on handwriting and fine motor skills. She also created an elementary school drawing program called Project 364.

Halperin lives in South Haven, Michigan.

== Selected works ==
=== Books illustrated ===
- Janet Taylor Lisle, The Lampfish of Twill, Orchard Books, 1991.
- Tres Seymour, Hunting the White Cow, Orchard Books, 1993.
- Anne Shelby, Homeplace, Orchard Books, 1995.
- Sarah Orne Jewett, A White Heron, Candlewick Press, 1997.
- Jim Aylesworth, The Full Belly Bowl, Atheneum, 1998.
- Kathryn Lasky, Sophie and Rose, Candlewick Press, 1998.
- Polly Horvath, The Trolls, Farrar, Straus & Giroux, 1999.
- Marsha Wilson Chall, Bonaparte, Dorling Kindersley, 2000.
- Cynthia Rylant, Let's Go Home: Some Wonderful Things about a House, Simon & Schuster, 2000.
- Cynthia Rylant series, Cobble Street Cousins, Simon & Schuster, 1998–2002.
- Karin Cates, The Secret Remedy Book: A Story of Comfort and Love, Orchard Books, 2003.
- Pete Seeger, adaptor, Turn! Turn! Turn!: Words from Ecclesiastes circa 250 B.C.E. Simon & Schuster, 2003.
- Elizabeth Spurr, adaptor, The Peterkins' Christmas (based on a story by Lucretia P. Hale), Atheneum, 2004.
- Reeve Lindbergh, The Visit, Dial, 2005.
- Elizabeth Spurr, adaptor, The Peterkins' Thanksgiving (based on a story by Lucretia P. Hale), Atheneum, 2005.
- Jane Yolen, Soft House, Candlewick Press, 2005.
- Douglas Wood, Nothing to Do, Dutton, 2006.
- Frances Hodgson Burnett, The Racketty-Packetty House, Simon & Schuster, 2006.
- Alice B. McGinty, Thank You, World, Dial, 2007.
- John Mooy, Once Upon a Mail Route, EDCO Publishing, 2008.
- Mary Ann Hoberman, Strawberry Hill, Little, Brown, 2009.
- August Gold, Thank You, God, for Everything, Putnam's, 2009.
- Joseph Bruchac, My Father Is Taller than a Tree, Dial Books for Young Readers, 2010.
- John Mooy, Once Upon a Small Town, EDCO Publishing, 2010.
- Kathryn O. Galbraith, Planting the Wild Garden, Peachtree Publishers, 2011.

=== Written and illustrated ===
- (Reteller) Guy de Maupassant, When Chickens Grow Teeth: A Story from the French, Orchard Books, 1996.
- Once upon a Company, Orchard Books, 1998.
- Love Is, Simon & Schuster, 2000.
- Peace, Simon & Schuster, 2013.
