= Before She Was Harriet =

2017 book by Lesa Cline-Ransome

- Author: Lesa Cline-Ransome
- Illustrator: James Ransome
- Language: English
- Genre: Children's picture book
- Publisher: Holiday House
- Publication date: 2017
- Publication place: United States
- Media type: Print (hardcover)
- Pages: 32
- Awards: Coretta Scott King Award
- ISBN: 9780823420476
- OCLC: 51795

Before She Was Harriet is a 2017 children's picture book written by Lesa Cline-Ransome and illustrated by James Ransome, first published by Holiday House. It was awarded an honorary Coretta Scott King Award in 2018.

== Synopsis ==
This children's picture book details the life of Harriet Tubman in a free verse journey on a train. It begins with Tubman as an old woman and moves backwards chronologically. The author outlines the many roles of Tubman: a suffragist, a boatman who ferried slaves across the Combahee River, a Union spy, a nurse for soldiers, a savior who helped her parents flee from slavery, a conductor on the Underground Railroad, a slave named Minty, and finally a young slave named Araminta. She chooses to change her name to Harriet when she leaves slavery. The book ends with a picture of Tubman sitting on a train, finally free.

== Background ==
The book was written and illustrated by husband and wife team Lesa Cline-Ransome and James E. Ransome. They have previously collaborated on fifteen books together. Cline-Ransome was nervous about approaching a book on Tubman, as there were already so many of them. Her husband did some research and suggested she write about Tubman's many roles in life. Ransome had already illustrated books about slavery before, so finding references was not a problem. Instead of painting historically accurate images, he focused on making them emotionally accurate.

== Reception ==
Before She Was Harriet was very well received. The Horn Book Magazine wrote about James Ransome illustrating Harriet's face at different angles but always with determination. A starred Publishers Weekly review praises the author's use of beautiful concise language and the illustrator's "lush scenes." A starred Booklist review, mentions how the poetry is simple enough for children while still being sophisticated in content. The critic says, "Libraries likely already have many Harriet Tubman books, but this well designed, unique approach warrants making room for one more." The publication also included it in their list of the "Top 10 Biographies for Youth." Critics from Kirkus Reviews enjoyed James Ransom's double paged watercolor illustrations, as they would help children fix themselves "in each time and place as the text takes them further into the past." Barbara L. Talcroft from Children's Literature says, "Lesa Cline-Raonsome and James E. Ransome have created a fitting tribute to her with Before She Was Harriet. The Ransomes take readers on a journey through time, exploring the many roles Harriet Tubman assumed in her extraordinary life."

== Awards and honors ==
Before She Was Harriet is a Junior Library Guild book.

Booklist, the Center for the Study of Multicultural Children's Literature, the Chicago Public Library, Kirkus Reviews named Before She Was Harriet one of the best books of 2017. The following year, Booklist included it on their lists of the year's "Top 10 Diverse Picture Books" and "Top 10 Biographies for Youth".

The Association for Library Service to Children included the audiobook narrated by Sisi Aisha Johnson and others on their 2018 list of Notable Children's Recordings, and Booklist included it on their 2018 list of "Audio Stars for Youth".

Awards for Before She Was Harriet
Year	Award	Result	Ref.
2018	Charlotte Zolotow Award	Honor	
2018	Christopher Award for Books for Children Ages 6 and up	Won	
2018	Coretta Scott King Award for Illustrator	Honor	
2018	Jane Addams Children's Book Award for Younger Reader	Honor	
2018	Maryland Blue Crab Young Reader Award for Transitional Nonfiction	Honor	
2018	NAACP Image Award for Outstanding Literary Work – Children	Finalist	

== Adaption ==
In February 2018, Dreamscape released a 7-minute film adaptation of Before She Was Harriet. The film's animation includes an adapted version of James E. Ransome's "lush and detailed watercolor illustrations", which Booklist's Jessica Lawrence notes "evoke the emotion, daring, and heroism of Tubman’s life". In a starred review of the film, Lawrence highlights how the film's "vivid background sounds and lovely violin, piano, and guitar music pair with Mia Ellis’ soothing narration, which conveys the transcendent human spirit of Harriet Tubman".
