= Lynn Joseph =

American writer

- Occupation: Writer; lawyer
- Education: University of Colorado (BA); Fordham University School of Law (JD)
- Genre: Children's books
- Notable awards: Américas Award 1994 Mermaid's Twin Sister; Américas Award 2000 The Color of My Words

Website
- www.lynnjosephbooks.com

Lynn Joseph is an American lawyer and author of children's books. Her novella The Color of My Words won an Américas Award for Children's and Young Adult Literature and a Jane Addams Children's Book Award.

== Early life and education ==
Lynn Joseph was born in Trinidad and moved to the United States at the age of nine. After moving to the United States with her family, she spent summers in Trinidad. As a student, she wrote poems and stories, and she published her work in student publications.

She graduated from the University of Colorado with a B.A. in 1986 and from Fordham University Law School with a J.D. in 1993. After college, she worked as an editorial assistant at Harper & Row Children's Books. During her career as an attorney, she worked for the City of New York in litigation, and for Rohn & Carpenter, a law firm based in the U.S. Virgin Islands.

== Literary career ==
In 1990, Joseph published the children's book Coconut Kind of Day: Island Poems, which features 13 poems narrated by a child describing her life in Trinidad. In 1991, she released A Wave in Her Pocket: Stories from Trinidad, a children's book of folklore from Trinidad, and released The Mermaid's Twin Sister: More Stories from Trinidad in 1994. In 1992, she released An Island Christmas, which describes a Trinidad Christmas from the child narrator's perspective. In 1994, she also released Jasmine's Parlour Day, a children's book featuring a story of a mother and daughter.

In 1998, Joseph released Jump Up Time: A Trinidad Carnival Story, a children's book about two sisters during the Trinidad Carnival, and Fly, Bessie, Fly, a children's book about Bessie Coleman, the first Black woman aviator. In 2000, she released The Color of My Words, a novella written for children that features a child protagonist and her life in the Dominican Republic.

In 2013, Joseph released the novel Flowers in the Sky, featuring a teenage protagonist and her life in the Dominican Republic and the Washington Heights neighborhood in New York City. In 2015, she released Dancing in the Rain, a novel featuring Dominican children and their experiences in the aftermath of the September 11 attacks era.

== Awards ==
She won the 1994 Américas Award for Children's and Young Adult Literature for The Mermaid’s Twin Sister, and she won the award again in 2000 for The Color of My Words. The Color of My Words also earned a Jane Addams Children's Book Award. Her manuscript for The Truth Is was a finalist for the 2015 Burt Award for Caribbean Literature.

== Publications ==
- Coconut Kind of Day: Island Poems (1990)
- A Wave in Her Pocket: Stories from Trinidad (1991)
- An Island Christmas (1992)
- The Mermaid's Twin Sister: More Stories from Trinidad (1994)
- Jasmine's Parlour Day (1994)
- Jump Up Time: A Trinidad Carnival Story (1998)
- Fly, Bessie, Fly (1998)
- The Color of My Words (2000)
- Flowers in the Sky (2013)
- Dancing in the Rain (2015)

== Personal life ==
Joseph resides in New York and Bermuda.
