= Anne Shelby =

American writer (born in 1948)

Anne Shelby (born September 25, 1948) is an American writer of children's picture books.

== Biography ==
=== Early life and education ===
Anne Gabbard was born on September 25, 1948, in Berea, Kentucky. Her parents were teachers. She attended Kentucky Southern in 1966 for one year before the college closed. She earned a Bachelor of Arts degree from St. Andrews College in 1970 and a Master of Arts degree from the University of Kentucky in 1981.

She married Jimmy Godwin on December 26, 1968, and they divorced in 1972. She married Edmund Shelby, a teacher, on August 25, 1972. She has one child. She lives in Oneida, Kentucky.

=== Career ===
She has worked for the Appalachian Writers Workshop, the School for the Creative and Performing Arts in Lexington, KY, Kentucky's Governor's School for the Arts, and for the gifted program at the University of Kentucky.

Three of Shelby's books have received starred reviews from Publishers Weekly or Kirkus Reviews: Homeplace (Orchard Books, 1995), The Someday House (Orchard Books, 1996), and The Man Who Lived in a Hollow Tree (Atheneum Books for Young Readers, 2009). Homeplace was a Junior Library Guild selection.

== Selected works ==
- Waiting for Daylight: For Soprano and Orchestra, with Steve Rouse, Primal Press Publishing, 1997.
- Appalachian Studies, Wind Publications, 2005.

=== Children's books ===
- We Keep a Store, illustrated by John Ward, Orchard Books, 1990.
- Potluck, illustrated by Irene Trivas, Orchard Books, 1991.
- What to Do about Pollution, illustrated by Irene Trivas, Orchard Books, 1993.
- Homeplace, illustrated by Wendy Anderson Halperin, Orchard Books, 1995.
- The Someday House, illustrated by Rosanne Litzinger. Orchard Books, 1996.
- The Adventures of Molly Whuppie and Other Appalachian Folktales, illustrated by Paula McArdle, University of North Carolina Press, 2007.
- The Man Who Lived in a Hollow Tree, illustrated by Cor Hazelar, Atheneum Books for Young Readers, 2009.
