= Mississippi Trial, 1955 =

2002 novel by Chris Crowe

- First edition cover
- Author: Chris Crowe
- Language: English
- Genre: Historical fiction
- Published: 2002
- Publisher: Phyllis Fogelman Books/Penguin Putnam Inc
- Publication place: United States
- Pages: 229

Mississippi Trial, 1955 is a historical fiction young adult novel by American author Chris Crowe, published in 2002. Set in Mississippi in 1955, the novel tells the true story of the abduction and murder of African-American teenaged boy Emmett Till as well as the trial of his murderers through the point of view of Till's fictionalized white friend Hiram Hillburn. The novel received mixed, but mostly positive reviews and won the International Reading Association Children's Book Award for Young Adult Fiction in 2003.

== Plot ==
in 1955, Hiram Hillburn, a sixteen-year-old white male, lives in [Arizona] with his father. He resents his father for moving the family from Greenwood, Mississippi when he was nine, away from his beloved Southern grandfather. Despite his father's concerns about letting him go due to the racial tensions in the city, Hiram is given permission to spend the summer visiting his grandfather in Mississippi. At the train station he meets his grandfather's housekeeper Ruthanne and her visiting cousin Emmett Till, a fourteen-year-old African American boy from Chicago. After reuniting with his grandfather, he begins to notice his grandfather's culturally ingrained racism. He meets Emmett again whom he rescues from drowning in a river. They begin talking and realize they have a lot in common.

Hiram runs into his old friend R.C. Rydell with whom he joins on a fishing trip where R.C. harasses and assaults Emmett. While Hiram does not participate, he does not help Emmett either and feels guilty. A few days later, R.C. tells Hiram that he is going with some white men to talk to a young African-American man who offended a white woman at a grocery store. Concerned for this young man, Hiram calls the police. However, the police are unhelpful to Hiram; they refuse to act, stating the boy from Chicago has to learn some manners. At this point, Hiram realizes they are talking about Emmett.

Emmett is reported missing shortly after and his corpse is found in the river a few days later with a cotton gin pulley around his neck. Two white men are arrested for kidnapping and go on trial for the murder of Emmett. Hiram delays his trip home to serve as a witness for the trial due to the information he had told the police. His grandfather wants him to stay out of the trial to avoid the drama, but Hiram wants to help find justice for Emmett causing contention between the two. Hiram stays for the entire trial, despite not being called as a witness and the suspects are acquitted of murder at the relief of Hiram's grandfather. Hiram becomes suspicious after seeing his grandfather sell his blue truck but his grandfather becomes angry when Hillburn confronts him about it. After running into his neighbors, Hiram learns that his grandfather was spotted with the suspects on the night of Emmett's disappearance. Hiram, again, confronts his grandfather about this information upon which his grandfather unapologetically admits to being involved and being in the White Citizens Council, fighting integration of public schools.

Having been absent since the night Emmett went missing, Hiram runs into R.C. who tells him that he considered participating in Emmett's abduction but decided instead to escape his abusive living situation and move to Jackson, Mississippi where he had been living ever since, doing physical labor. When Hiram prepares to return to Arizona, he expects an apology from his grandfather but is disappointed to never receive one. He meets his father at the railway station whom he begins to tell everything, repairing their previously broken relationship.

== Publication ==
Author Chris Crowe was unfamiliar with the Emmett Till case before researching for his book Presenting Mildred D. Taylor. In one of Taylor's essays, she described how she was affected by the Till murder as a child. After researching the case, Crowe determined that, despite its wide coverage at the time, most people were unfamiliar with the case and was excluded from most United States history classes. Crowe wrote Mississippi Trial, 1955 in order to teach American young adults about the case. He decided to tell the history of the murder and trial through a fiction story as a way to appeal to young adults. It was published in 2002 by Phyllis Fogelman Books/Penguin Putnam.

== Reception ==
The novel received mixed, yet mostly positive reviews. Kirkus Reviews said of the novel that, "Teen readers will find themselves caught up in Hiram's very real struggle to do the right thing." Publishers Weekly called the novel a "promising debut" and that although "the conclusion feels a little hasty, Crowe's otherwise measured treatment will get readers thinking."

== Awards ==
The novel won the International Reading Association Children's Book Award for Young Adult Fiction in 2003. It was also awarded the Jefferson Cup Award for best U.S. historical fiction. In 2003, the book was honored on the American Library Association's list of Best Books for Young Adults. Additionally it was added on the 2003 list of Notable Social Studies Trade Books for Young People by the National Council for Social Studies.
