= M. B. Goffstein =

American writer

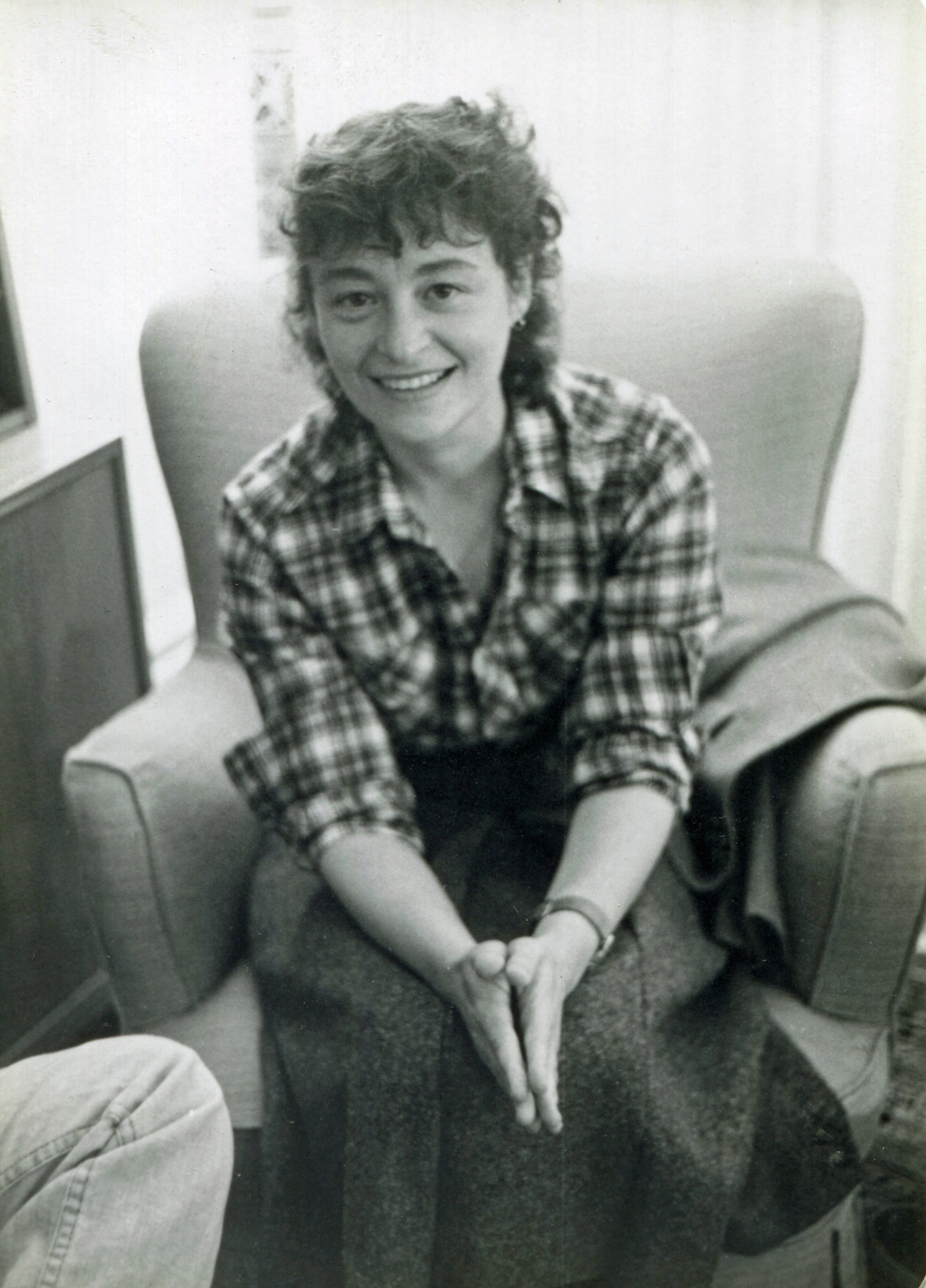
- Born: December 20, 1940; St. Paul, Minnesota
- Died: December 20, 2017 (aged 77); Danbury, Connecticut, US
- Resting place: Temple of Aaron Cemetery; Roseville, Minnesota, U.S.
- Citizenship: USA
- Education: Bennington College
- Occupations: Author, artist, teacher
- Spouse: David Allender
- Writing career
- Language: English
- Genre: Children's literature
- Notable works: Fish for Supper; Natural History; An Artist
- Notable awards: New York Times Best Illustrated Children's Books of the Year; Jane Addams Children's Book Award; Caldecott Honor

M. B. Goffstein (20 December 1940–20 December 20, 2017) was an American writer and illustrator of books for children and adults. She was the recipient of three New York Times Best Illustrated Children's Books of the Year (A Little Schubert, Natural History, and An Artist), Special Recognition from the Jane Addams Children's Book Award (Natural History), and a Caldecott Honor for Fish for Supper.

== Biography ==
Marilyn Brooke Goffstein was born in St. Paul, Minnesota on December 20, 1940, the daughter of Albert and Esther (Rosentzweig) Goffstein. She graduated from Bennington College in 1962, creating a sculpture for her senior show. Her first children's book, The Gats!, was published in 1966 with editor Michael di Capua. They worked for the next twenty years together—their last project coming in 1986 with My Editor.

In the summer of 1980, she taught with Lore Segal at the Writing Workshops at Bennington College. She also taught children's book illustration at Parsons School of Design and the University of Minnesota's Split Rock Arts summer program.

== Works ==
- The Gats! (1966)
- Sleepy People (1966)
- Brookie and Her Lamb (1967)
- Across the Sea (1968)
- Goldie the Dollmaker (1969)
- Two Piano Tuners (1970)
- The Underside of the Leaf (1972)
- A Little Schubert (1972)
- Me and My Captain (1974)
- The First Books (1979)
- Daisy Summerfield's Style (1975)
- Fish for Supper (1976)
- My Crazy Sister (1976)
- Family Scrapbook (1978)
- My Noah's Ark (1978)
- Natural History (1979)
- Neighbors (1979)
- An Artist (1980)
- Laughing Latkes (1980)
- Lives of the Artists (1981)
- A Writer (1984)
- An Artists Album (1985)
- My Editor (1986)
- Our Snowman (1986)
- School of Names (1986)
- Your Lone Journey (1986)
- Artists' Helpers Enjoy the Evenings (1987)
- An Actor (as Brooke Goffstein, 1987)
- Our Prairie Home: A Picture Album (as Brooke Goffstein, 1988)
- A House, a Home (as Brooke Goffstein, 1989)
- Words Alone: Twenty-Six Books Without Pictures (2018)
- Art Girls Together: Two Novels (2018)
- Daisy Summerfield's Art: The Complete Flea Market Mysteries (2019)
- Biography of Miss Go Chi: Novelettos & Poems (2019)
