= Charlotte Pomerantz =

American writer (1930–2022)

Charlotte Inez Pomerantz (July 24, 1930 – July 24, 2022) was an American children's writer and journalist.

== Early life and education ==
Charlotte Inez Pomerantz was born on July 24, 1930, in Brooklyn, New York, to Phyllis (Cohen) and Abraham Pomerantz. She received a bachelor's degree from Sarah Lawrence College in 1953.

== Personal life ==
Pomerantz married Carl Marzani on November 12, 1966. She died in Charlottesville, Virginia, on July 24, 2022, her 92nd birthday.

== Works ==
Her 1975 story The Princess and the Admiral won a Jane Addams Children's Book Award. Pomerantz's story The Piggy in the Puddle appeared on Reading Rainbow in 1992.

Books published by Marzani & Munsell

- A quarter-century of un-Americana: a tragico-comical memorabilia of HUAC (1963)
- The mood of the nation (November 22–29, 1963)

Pamphlet published by the Labor Committee for Peace in Vietnam

- The Unspeakable War: Dead End of a Colonial War 1940–1966 (1966)

Books for children

- All Asleep (1984)
- One Duck, Another Duck (1984)
- How Many Trucks Can A Tow Truck Tow? (1987)
- The Mousery (2000)
- Posy(1983), winner of the Christopher Award 1984
