= Andrea Davis Pinkney =

American writer (born 1963)

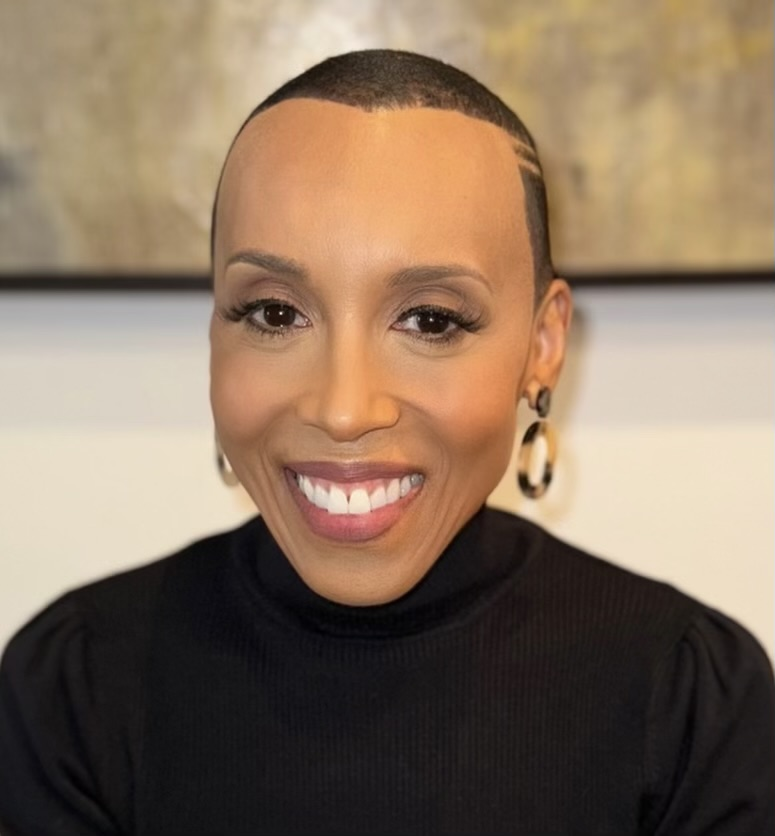
- Pinkney in 2025
- Born: Andrea Rae Davis; September 25, 1963 (age 63); Washington, D.C., United States
- Education: Syracuse University
- Occupations: Children's book author and publisher
- Writing career
- Genre: Children's literature
- Notable awards: Coretta Scott King Award
- Website: https://www.andreadavispinkney.net/

Andrea Davis Pinkney (born September 25, 1963) is an American author of numerous books for children and young adults. She is a New York Times and USA Today bestselling author of picture books, novels, works of historical fiction and nonfiction; she writes about African-American culture. In addition to her work as an author, Pinkney has had a career as a children's book publisher and editor, including as founder of the Jump at the Sun imprint at Hyperion Books for Children, the Disney Book Group (now Disney Publishing Worldwide). She is vice president and executive editor for Scholastic Children's Book Group at Scholastic Trade Books.

The books she has authored have won the Coretta Scott King Award and Coretta Scott King Honor Award, the Boston Globe–Horn Book Honor Medal, the Carter G. Woodson Award, the Children's Africana Book Award, and others. Her books have received industry citations, among them the ALA Notable Books five times, School Library Journal best books three times, New York Times Editor's Choice and Notable books, and more. She has been nominated four times for the NAACP Image Award, twice for outstanding literary works for youth and teens and twice for outstanding literary works children.

Pinkney is a graduate of Syracuse University's Newhouse School of Public Communications and is a former member of the Newhouse School's Board of Trustees. She lives in New York City with her husband, two-time Caldecott Honor award-winning illustrator Brian Pinkney. She is the daughter-in-law of children's book illustrator Jerry Pinkney, the first African-American Illustrator to win the Caldecott Medal.

== Biography ==
Andrea Rae Davis was born September 25, 1963, in Washington D.C. and was raised in Connecticut. Her parents were involved in the civil rights movement and exposed her to the cause from early on, even taking her to the annual conference of the National Urban League during many of her summer vacations.

Pinkney graduated from Syracuse University's S.I. Newhouse School of Public Communications in 1985 with a degree in journalism and began working as an editor at Mechanix Illustrated. She then went on to work as a senior editor at Essence, as well as an editor for the book publishers Simon & Schuster and Scholastic. She held leadership roles at Disney Publishing Worldwide and Houghton Mifflin Company.

While working at Mechanix Illustrated, she met Brian Pinkney, a Caldecott Honor-winning children's book illustrator, whom she later married. Collectively, the two have published nearly 70 books, including the New York Times bestseller Sit In: How Four Friends Stood Up By Sitting Down, the Caldecott Honor and Coretta Scott King Honor book Duke Ellington, the USA Today bestseller Ella Fitzgerald, Seven Candles for Kwanzaa, Dear Benjamin Banneker and others. The couple has also created the Bright Brown Baby board book series.

She was chosen to deliver the 2014 May Hill Arbuthnot Lecture at the University of Minnesota Libraries, Children's Literature Research Collections, Saturday, May 3, 2014, from 7:00 PM to 9:00 PM (CDT). She was cited in January 2013 for "significant contributions to literature for young people provided through a body of work that brings a deeper understanding of African American heritage". She is recognized among Children's Health magazine's "25 Most Influential People in Our Children's Lives" and named among The Network Journal's "25 Most Influential Black Women in Business."

She currently lives in Brooklyn, New York.

== Honors and awards ==
- Carter G. Woodson Book Award, 2011
- Coretta Scott King Award, 2013
- The George Arents Award (Syracuse University's highest alumni honor, presented annually to alumni who have made outstanding contributions to their chosen fields)
- Medgar Evers College Lifetime Achievement Award
- Jane Addams Children's Book Award
- Regina Medal for Distinguished Contribution to Children's Literature
- Lee Bennet Hopkins Poetry Award
- Boston Globe–Horn Book Honor Medal
- National Parenting Publication Gold Medal
- Literacy Partners Champion Literacy Award
- Kerlan Award
- Knickerbocker Award
- Children's Africana Book Award
- Children's Book Council Outstanding Achievement Diversity Award
- The Adam's Prize, for work on behalf of children with disabilities
- New York State Writers Hall of Fame

== Selected bibliography ==
=== Picture books ===
- Duke Ellington: The Piano Prince and His Orchestra
- Ella Fitzgerald; illustrated by Brian Pinkney
- Sit In: How Four Friends Stood Up by Sitting Down; illustrated by Brian Pinkney
- Because of You John Lewis: The True Story of a Remarkable Friendship; illustrated by Keith Henry Brown
- A Poem for Peter: The Story of Ezra Jack Keats and the Creation of The Snowy Day; illustrated by Steve Johnson and Lou Fancher
- Sojourner Truth's Step Stomp Stride; illustrated by Brian Pinkney
- Seven Candles for Kwanzaa; illustrated by Brian Pinkney
- Alvin Ailey; illustrated by Brian Pinkney
- And She Was Loved: Toni Morrison's Life in Stories; illustrated by Daniel Minter
- Boycott Blues: How Rosa Parks Inspired a Nation; illustrated by Brian Pinkney
- Martin & Mahalia: His Words, Her Song; illustrated by Brian Pinkney
- Dear Benjamin Banneker; illustrated by Brian Pinkney
- Bill Pickett Rodeo Ridin' Cowboy; illustrated by Brian Pinkney
- Mims Christmas Jam; illustrated by Brian Pinkney
- Fishing Day; illustrated by Shane Evans
- Peggony Po; illustrated by Brian Pinkney
- Sleeping Cutie; illustrated by Brian Pinkney

=== Narrative nonfiction ===
- Hand in Hand: 10 Black Men Who Changed America; illustrated by Brian Pinkney
- Let It Shine: Stories of Black Women Freedom Fighters; illustrated by Stephen Alcorn
- Martin Rising: Requiem for a King; illustrated by Brian Pinkney
- Rhythm Ride: A Road Trip Through the Motown Sound

=== Chapter book series ===
- She Persisted: Harriet Tubman
- She Persisted: Ella Fitzgerald
- Dear Mr. President: Abraham Lincoln
- Solo Girl
- Meet the Obamas
- Peace Warriors

=== Middle grade novels ===
- The Red Pencil
- Raven in a Dove House
- With the Might of Angels
- Loretta Little Looks Back: Three Voices Go Tell It
- Bird in a Box
- Hold Fast to Dreams
- Silent Thunder

=== Young adult ===
- Ten9Eight: Teen Business Blasts Off

=== Baby books ===
- Bright Brown Baby Treasury
- Peek-a-You
- Count to Love
- Baby Boy, You Are a Star
- Hello, Baby Girl
- Hey, Beautiful You
- Pretty Brown Face
- I Smell Honey
- Watch Me Dance
- Shake, Shake, Shake *All baby books illustrated by Brian Pinkney

=== Anthologies ===
- Stay True: Short Stories for Strong Girls
- Birthday Wishes
- 100 Reasons to Love Reading
