= Kathryn O. Galbraith =

Kathryn Galbraith
- Born: Kathryn Osebold; January 22, 1945 (age 80); Detroit, Michigan, U.S.
- Education: University of Michigan (BA, MLS)
- Occupation(s): Author · librarian
- Spouse: Stephen Galbraith (m. 1971)

Kathryn Osebold Galbraith (born January 22, 1945) is an American author of children's books.

== Early life and education ==
Kathryn Osebold was born to Charles H. and Gertrude Osebold in Detroit, Michigan, on January 22, 1945. She was raised in Plymouth, Michigan. Her mother gave her a copy of Little Women by Louisa May Alcott; Galbraith read it multiple times. Galbraith earned a Bachelor of Arts degree in 1967 and a Master of Library Science in 1970, both from the University of Michigan.

== Career ==
Galbraith worked as a librarian at the Seattle Public Library, Fordham University at Lincoln Center, and Family Service Association of America. She has taught writing for children at the University of Washington in Seattle. She was the director of the Tacoma Philharmonic from 1982 to 1996.

=== Writing ===
Something about the Author observed that Galbraith is known for her "realistic situations" that she presents "through warm and clear prose".

Galbrith's first book, Spots Are Special (Margaret K. McElderry Books, 1976), is about a girl who has chickenpox.

She published three chapter books about sisters who become roommates prior to the arrival of another sibling: Roommates (Margaret K. McElderry Books 1990), Roommates and Rachel (Margaret K. McElderry Books, 1991), and Roommates Again (Margaret K. McElderry Books, 1994). She is also known for her Babies in the Park series (Peachtree, 2018–2019).

Galbraith is a member of the Society of Children's Book Writers and Illustrators.

==== Critical reception ====
Galbraith received a School Library Journal Best Books citation in 1990 for Laura Charlotte (Philomel, 1990).

She received Parents' Choice Awards for Laura Charlotte and Arbor Day Square (Peachtree, 2010).

A starred review of Planting the Wild Garden (Peachtree, 2012) that appeared in Publishers Weekly noted the "lighthearted prose" that was "enlivened with typographic curves and swoops".

Her book Two Bunny Buddies (HMH Books, 2014) received a starred review from Kirkus Reviews that commented on how "the minimal text conveys an entire plot full of humor and emotion in just a few words, effectively using action verbs, repetition and occasional rhyming word pairs".

== Personal life ==
Galbraith married Stephen Galbraith in 1971. She lives in Tacoma, Washington.

== Selected works ==
=== Picture books ===
- Spots Are Special! illustrated by Diane Dawson, Margaret K. McElderry Books, 1976.
- Katie Did! illustrated by Ted Ramsey, Margaret K. McElderry Books, 1982.
- Waiting for Jennifer, illustrated by Irene Trivas, Margaret K. McElderry Books, 1987.
- Laura Charlotte, illustrated by Floyd Cooper, Philomel, 1990.
- Look! Snow! illustrated by Nina Montezinos, Margaret K. McElderry Books, 1992.
- Traveling Babies, illustrated by Jane Dippold, NorthWord Books for Young Readers, 2006.
- Boo, Bunny! illustrated by Jeff Mack, Harcourt, 2008.
- Arbor Day Square, illustrated by Cyd Moore, Peachtree Publishers, 2010.
- Planting the Wild Garden, illustrated by Wendy Anderson Halperin, Peachtree Publishers, 2012.
- Where Is Baby? illustrated by John Butler, Peachtree, 2013.
- Two Bunny Buddies, illustrated by Joe Cepeda, HMH Books, 2014.

==== Babies in the Park series ====
- Winter Babies, illustrated by Adela Pons, Peachtree, 2018.
- Autumn Babies, illustrated by Adela Pons, Peachtree, 2018.
- Summer Babies, illustrated by Adela Pons, Peachtree, 2018.
- Spring Babies, illustrated by Adela Pons, Peachtree, 2019.

=== Chapter books ===
- Come Spring, Margaret K. McElderry Books, 1979.
- Something Suspicious, Margaret K. McElderry Books, 1985.
- Roommates, illustrated by Mark Graham, Margaret K. McElderry Books, 1990.
- Roommates and Rachel, illustrated by Mark Graham, Margaret K. McElderry Books, 1991.
- Roommates Again, illustrated by Mark Graham, Margaret K. McElderry Books, 1994.
- Holding onto Sunday, illustrated by Michael Hays, Margaret K. McElderry Books, 1995.
