= Karin Cates =

American children's writer

Karin Wulf Cates is an author of children's picture books.

== Biography ==
Cates attended Bryan Adams High School in Dallas. Before her writing career, Cates worked as a teacher.

She was diagnosed with multiple myeloma in 1998. In 2002, she lived in the Hyde Park neighborhood of Dallas.

=== Writing career ===
Cates is known for two children's picture books. A Far-Fetched Story (Greenwillow Books, 2002) was noted for its quilt-like appearance in multiple reviews. Kirkus Reviews called it "an original tale just waiting to be told". A Publishers Weekly review said, "Newcomer Cates follows a successful folktale formula to a T with a no-nonsense grandma and her catchy refrain".

The Secret Remedy Book (Orchard/Scholastic, 2003) was called "a gentle story" in Kirkus Reviews, which also noted, "solace, ritual, simplicity, tenderness, and care for the natural world are offered on each page as naturally as breathing". It received a starred review from Publishers Weekly, which noted, "the leisurely pace of the text" and that the book "reflect[s] a faith that all will be completed in a timey way, without rushing".

== Selected works ==
- A Far-Fetched Story. Illustrated by Nancy Carpenter. Greenwillow Books, 2002.
- The Secret Remedy Book. Illustrated by Wendy Anderson Halperin. Orchard/Scholastic, 2003.
