= The Color of My Words =

2000 novel by Lynn Joseph

- Author: Lynn Joseph
- Language: English
- Publisher: Harper-Collins
- Publication place: United States
- ISBN: 978-0-06-028233-2

The Color of My Words is a young adult fiction book by Trinidadian author Lynn Joseph. It was published in 2000 by Harper-Collins.

In 2001, it was named a Jane Addams Children's Book Award Honor Book.

The book is set in the Dominican Republic.
