= The Mousery =

Children's book by Charlotte Pomerantz

- Author: Charlotte Pomerantz
- Illustrator: Kurt Cyrus
- Language: English
- Genre: Children's fiction
- Published: September 2000
- Publisher: Harcourt/Gulliver
- Publication place: United States
- Pages: 40 (unpaged)
- ISBN: 0-15-202304-6

The Mousery is a 2000 children's book by Charlotte Pomerantz, with illustrations by Kurt Cyrus. The book is centered around two mouse misers who open their doors to four youngsters and was published by the Harcourt/Gulliver imprint. Critics praised Cyrus' artwork, but were indifferent over the rhymes and plot. It became a 2001 Christopher Award winner in the "Books for Young People" category.

== Synopsis ==
Sliver and Slice, two bachelor mouse misers living in an abandoned car whose trunk doubles as a "mousery", are averse to the company of neighbors and visitors alike. One night, they have a change of heart after letting four young mice, looking for shelter during a winter storm, into their home. Soon after, when those guests (or "mousekins") break into a lullaby, the misers realize they once heard it from their grandmother and reminisce about their own youth. They eventually all welcome and invite others from nearby as Sliver and Slice rehabilitate their home.

== Release and reception ==
Announced in February 2000, The Mousery was published by Harcourt/Gulliver that September; critical analysis was mixed to positive. Marlene Gawron of the School Library Journal offered commentary on the "realistic illustrations" and added that the "enjoyable story is beautifully executed". The Horn Book and Kirkus Reviews opined that Kurt Cyrus' work rose above the "tedious rhyme", "pedestrian text", and "cutesy verses". Publishers Weekly's staff shared similar sentiments, and commented prior to the title's publication: "[I]t is unclear what exactly motivates the change in the older mice: the mousekins' obvious need, their excellent behavior or the memories they evoke." In early 2001, The Mousery was one of five winners in the "Books for Young People" category at the 52nd annual Christopher Awards.
