= Veera Hiranandani =

American writer of children's books

- Education: George Washington University; Sarah Lawrence College
- Occupation: Writer
- Writing career
- Notable work: The Night Diary
- Notable awards: John Newbery Honor 2019
- Website: www.veerahiranandani.com

Veera Hiranandani (Sindhi: ويرا هيراننداڻي)is an American writer of children's books. Her 2018 novel, The Night Diary, received a Newbery Honor in 2019. Her novel How to Find What You're Not Looking For won the 2022 Jane Addams Children's Book Award.

== Life and work ==
Hiranandani, the daughter of a Jewish mother and a Sindhi Hindu father who was originally from India, was raised in Connecticut. She attended George Washington University, and later studied fiction writing at Sarah Lawrence College. Her first book, The Whole Story of Half a Girl, was published in 2012. It would become a Sydney Taylor Notable Book and a South Asian Book Award Finalist

Hiranandani's next novel, The Night Diary, is set against the background of the 1947 Partition of India. She stated that this book was partly inspired by the experiences of her father, who was nine at the time of the Partition, and fled his home with his family. The book was named one of two Newbery Honor titles in 2019.

Hiranandani lives and works in New York state.
