= Lesa Cline-Ransome =

American writer

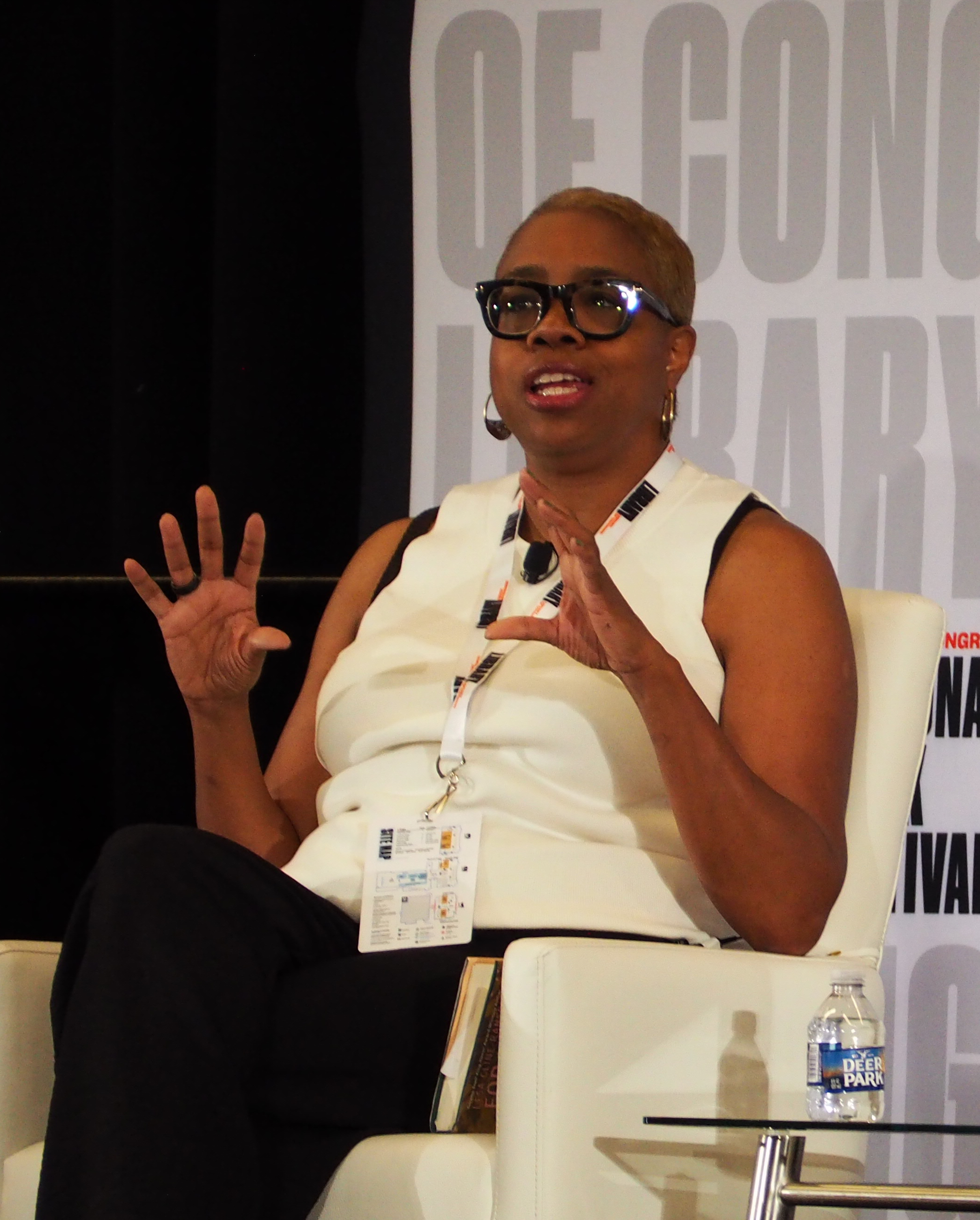
- Education: Pratt Institute (BFA); New York University (MA)
- Spouse: James E. Ransome
- Children: 4
- Writing career
- Language: English
- Years active: 2003–present
- Genres: Middle grade fiction, picture books
- Notable works: Finding Langston; Before She Was Harriet
- Notable awards: Scott O'Dell Award for Historical Fiction (2019); Coretta Scott King Author Honor Award (2025) Newbery Honor Award ( 2025)
- Website: www.lesaclineransome.com

Lesa Cline-Ransome (née Cline) is an American author of picture books and middle grade novels, best known for her NAACP Image Award-nominated picture book biography of Harriet Tubman, Before She Was Harriet and her middle grade novel Finding Langston.

== Personal life ==
Cline-Ransome grew up in Malden, Massachusetts. Both her parents are nurses and she is the youngest of three siblings.

She decided she wanted to become a writer during middle school and completed a summer workshop for teens with an interest in journalism at Suffolk University. She ultimately decided that journalism wasn't for her and stopped wanting to become a writer until she received encouragement from her professors while studying at Pratt Institute. There, she worked for the college paper and took on a job in advertising. She went to New York University for graduate school in Elementary Education.

She didn't pick up her interest in writing until she married her husband, James Ransome, who encouraged her to write books for children while he was working on illustrating his own first novel. She researched for nearly a year after the birth of her first child before an editor at Simon & Schuster took a chance on what would later become her first published picture book, Satchel Paige.

She lives with her husband and four children in Rhinebeck, New York.

== Works ==
Middle grade One Big Open Sky (Holiday House)

- Finding Langston (Holiday House, 2018)
- Leaving Lymon (Holiday House, 2020)
- Being Clem (Holiday House, 2021)

Picture books

- Bug Club Pro Guided Year 6 The Road to Freedom (Bug Club Guided) (Pearson Education Limited, 2017)
- Bug Club Comprehension Y6 The Road to Freedom 12-pack (Bug Club Guided) (Pearson Education Limited, 2017)
- illustrated by James E. Ransome
  - Quilt Alphabet (Holiday House, 2002)
  - Quilt Counting (Chronicle Books, 2002)
  - Satchel Paige (Aladdin, 2003)
  - Major Taylor, Champion Cyclist (Atheneum, 2003)
  - Young Pele: Soccer's First Star (Schwartz & Wade, 2007)
  - Helen Keller: The World in Her Heart (Collins Publishers, 2008)
  - Before There Was Mozart: The Story of Joseph Boulogne, Chevalier de Saint-George (Schwartz & Wade, 2011)
  - Words Set Me Free: The Story of Young Frederick Douglass (Simon & Schuster, 2012)
  - Light in the Darkness: A Story about How Slaves Learned in Secret (Jump at the Sun, 2013)
  - Benny Goodman & Teddy Wilson: Taking the Stage as the First Black-And-White Jazz Band in History (Holiday House, 2014)
  - My Story, My Dance: Robert Battle's Journey to Alvin Ailey (Paula Wiseman Books, 2015)
  - Freedom's School (Paula Wiseman Books, 2015)
  - Just a Lucky So and So: The Story of Louis Armstrong (Holiday House, 2016)
  - Before She Was Harriet (Holiday House, 2017)
  - Germs: Sickness, Bad Breath, and Pizza (Henry Holt, 2017)
  - Game Changers: The Story of Venus and Serena Williams (Paula Wiseman Books, 2018)
- illustrated by G. Brian Karas
  - Whale Trails, Before and Now, illustrated by G. Brian Karas (Henry Holt, 2015)
- illustrated by Raul Colon
  - Counting the Stars: The Story of Katherine Johnson, NASA Mathematician (Paula Wiseman Books, 2019)

They Call Me Teach: Lessons in Freedom ( Candlewick Press) illustrated by James Ransome “Fighting with Live: The Legacy of John Lewis” ( Simon & Schuster) illustrated by James Ransome

== Awards ==
Nominated

- 2018 NAACP Image Award in Outstanding Literary Work - Children's category for Before She Was Harriet

Won

- 2025 Newbery Honor for One Big Open Sky
- 2025 Coretta Scott King Award – Author Honor for One Big Open Sky
- 2025 Jane Addams Children's Book Award – Picture Book for They Call Me Teach: Lessons in Freedom
- 2025 Cardinal Cup Winner One Big Open Sky
- 2021 Mathical Book Prize – Grades K–2 Honor for Counting the Stars: The Story of Katherine Johnson, NASA Mathematician
- 2019 Coretta Scott King Award – Author Honor for Finding Langston
- 2019 Charlotte Zolotow Award – Highly Commended Title for Before She Was Harriet
- 2018 Jane Addams Children's Book Award – Younger Children Honor for Before She Was Harriet
