= Nancy Carpenter =

American illustrator of children's picture books

Nancy Carpenter is an American illustrator of children's picture books.

== Biography ==
Carpenter's mother was an art teacher.

Carpenter worked as a graphic reporter for Associated Press and illustrator for the New York Times.

She has published dozens of children's picture books with authors such as Anna Quindlen, Karen Hesse, and Jane Yolen.

Carpenter's books have won several awards, including: for Sitti's Secrets (Four Winds Press, 1994), a Notable Children's Books designation from the American Library Association (ALA) and Jane Addams Children's Book Award; for Apples to Oregon (Atheneum, 2004), a Golden Kite Award from the Society of Children's Book Writers and Illustrators and ALA Notable Children's Books designation; for Emma Dilemma (Clarion Books, 2011), an ALA Notable Children's Books designation; and for Queen Victoria's Bathing Machine (Simon & Schuster, 2014), an ALA Notable Children's Books designation.

Carpenter is married and has two children. She lives in Brooklyn.

== Selected works ==
- Sharon Phillips Denslow. At Taylor's Place. Bradbury Press. 1990.
- Sharon Phillips Denslow. Riding with Aunt Lucy. Bradbury Press, 1991.
- Virginia Krod. Masai and I. Four Winds Press, 1992.
- Anna Quindlen. The Tree That Came to Stay. Crown, 1992.
- Karen Hesse. Lester's Dog. Crown, 1993.
- Sharon Phillips Denslow. Bus Riders. Four Winds Press, 1993.
- Naomi Shihab Nye. Sitti’s Secrets. Four Winds Press, 1994.
- Jacqueline Briggs Martin. Washing the Willow Tree Loon. Simon & Schuster, 1995.
- Margery Facklam. Only a Star. Eerdmans, 1996.
- Virginia Krod. Can You Dance, Dalila? Simon & Schuster, 1996.
- Kate Jacobs. A Sister’s Wish. Hyperion, 1996.
- Eve Bunting. Twinnies. Harcourt Brace, 1997.
- Alexis O'Neill. Loud Emily. Simon & Schuster, 1998.
- Kathi Appelt. Someone’s Come to Our House. Eerdmans, 1999.
- Darleen Bailey Beard. Twister. Farrar, Straus & Giroux, 1999.
- Eve Bunting. A Picnic in October. Harcourt Brace, 1999.
- Lynea Bowdish. Brooklyn, Bugsy, and Me. Farrar, Straus & Giroux, 2000.
- Barbara Ann Porte. If You Ever Get Lost: The Adventures of Julia and Evan. Greenwillow Books, 2000.
- Deborah Hopkinson. Fannie in the Kitchen: The Whole Story from Soup to Nuts of How Fannie Farmer Invented Recipes with Precise Measurements. Atheneum, 2001.
- Karin Cates. A Far-Fetched Story. Greenwillow Books, 2002.
- Eve Bunting. Little Bear’s Little Boat. Clarion Books, 2003.
- Naomi Shihab Nye. Baby Radar. Greenwillow Books, 2003.
- Kay Winters. Abe Lincoln: The Boy Who Loved Books. Simon & Schuster, 2003.
- Deborah Hopkinson. Apples to Oregon: Being the (Slightly) True Narrative of How a Brave Pioneer Father Brought Apples, Peaches, Pears, Plums, Grapes, and Cherries (and Children) across the Plains. Atheneum, 2004.
- Linda Arms White. I Could Do That! Esther Morris Gets Women the Vote. Farrar, Straus, & Giroux, 2005.
- Jenny Offill. 17 Things I’m Not Allowed to Do Anymore. Schwartz & Wade Books, 2007.
- Linda Ashman. M Is for Mischief: An A to Z of Naughty Children. Dutton, 2008.
- Candace Fleming. Imogene’s Last Stand. Schwartz & Wade Books, 2009.
- Jane Yolen. My Uncle Emily. Philomel Books, 2009.
- Jenny Offill. Eleven Experiments That Failed. Schwartz & Wade Books, 2011.
- Kristine O'Connell George. Emma Dilemma: Big Sister Poems. Clarion Books, 2011.
- Toni Buzzeo. Lighthouse Christmas. Dial Books for Young Readers, 2011.
- Elisa Carbone. Heroes of the Surf: A Rescue Story Based on True Events. Viking, 2012.
- Eve Bunting. Big Bear’s Big Boat. Clarion Books, 2013.
- Eva Moore. Lucky Ducklings. Orchard Books, 2013.
- Gloria Whelan. Queen Victoria’s Bathing Machine. Simon & Schuster, 2014.
- Lynn Cullen. Dear Mr. Washington. Dial Books for Young Readers, 2015.
- Deborah Hopkinson. A Letter to My Teacher. Schwartz & Wade/Random, 2017.
- Michelle Markel. Newbery and the Boisterous Birth of Children’s Books. Chronicle, 2017.
- Marilyn Singer. Have You Heard about Lady Bird? Poems about Our First Ladies. Disney-Hyperion, 2018.
- Carrie Clickard. Thomas Jefferson and the Mammoth Hunt. Paula Wiseman/Simon & Schuster, 2019.
- Colleen Paeff. The Great Stink: How Joseph Bazalgette Solved London's Poop Pollution Problem. McElderry, 2021.
- Linda Ashman. Fire Chief Fran. Astra Young Readers, 2022.
- Jonah Winter. Mother Jones and Her Army of Mill Children. Schwartz & Wade/Random, 2022.
