= The Same Stuff as Stars =

2002 children's novel written by Katherine Paterson

- First edition
- Author: Katherine Paterson
- Publisher: Clarion Books
- Publication date: 2002
- Media type: Hardcover
- Pages: 242
- ISBN: 0618247440

The Same Stuff as Stars is a children's novel written by Katherine Paterson. It was published in 2002.

== Summary ==
Paterson's book, The Same Stuff as Stars deals with the struggles of a young girl, Angel. Verna Morgan is a single mother who struggles to support her family. Verna's daughter Angel is often left caring for her seven-year-old brother, Bernie. Their mother visits their father who is in jail, and then unexpectedly forces them to pack their belongings. The children are taken to what seems to be the middle of nowhere, to an unfamiliar farm; the Morgan Farm. There, they find their great-grandmother, and their mother leaves them again for a few days. But Angel meets a mysterious stranger encouraging her to reach for the stars. The story later unfolds as Angel makes friends, learns about stars, about her relatives and the disappearing of her mysterious star man.

== Reception ==
It was Co-winner of the Paterson Prize 2003, and an Honor Book for The Mitten, Judy Lopez Memorial, and Jane Addams Awards in 2003
