= Marilyn Sachs =

American children's writer

- Born: Marilyn Stickle; December 18, 1927; New York City, U.S.
- Died: December 28, 2016 (aged 89); San Francisco, California, U.S.
- Education: Hunter College (BA); Columbia University (MLS)
- Occupation: Author
- Spouse: Morris Sachs
- Writing career
- Genre: Children's literature
- Notable work: Veronica Ganz

Marilyn Sachs (December 18, 1927 – December 28, 2016) was an American author of award-winning children's books.

== Early life and education ==
Sachs was born in New York City and grew up in the Bronx. She earned a bachelor's degree from Hunter College and a master's in library science from Columbia University. Sachs worked as a children's librarian at the Brooklyn Public Library while working toward her graduate degree.

== Career ==
Sachs began focusing on her writing during a leave of absence from her library job in 1954. Unable to sell her first novel, Amy Moves In, she set it aside and moved with her husband and children to San Francisco, California in 1961, taking a job at the Main Library.

Sachs found a publisher for her book in 1964. By 1968, she had made enough money from her first four published novels to quit her librarian job and become a full-time writer. Sachs wrote 40 books in total, between 1964 and 2006.

== Personal life ==
While living in New York, Sachs was active in the political organization American Youth for Democracy, which is where she met her future husband, sculptor Morris Sachs. Sachs continued her activism later in life, fighting for public school integration and demonstrating against the Vietnam War. In 1991, she co-edited The Big Book for Peace; the proceeds were donated to peace organizations.

== Death ==
Sachs died in Tacoma, Washington on December 28, 2016, at the age of 89.

== Selected works ==
- Amy Moves In. Doubleday. 1964. ISBN 9780590323017.
- Laura's Luck. Doubleday. 1965. ISBN 9780385056878.
- Amy and Laura. Doubleday. 1966. ISBN 9780590322997.
- Veronica Ganz. Dell. 1968. ISBN 9780440792055.
- The Bears' House. Doubleday. 1971. ISBN 9780385033633.
- A Pocket Full of Seeds. Doubleday. 1973. ISBN 9780385060912.
- Matt's Mitt. Doubleday. 1975. ISBN 0385002661.
- Fleet-Footed Florence (sequel to Matt's Mitt). Doubleday. 1981. ISBN 0385127456.
- The Fat Girl. E.P. Dutton. 1984. ISBN 9780525440765.
- Lost in America. Macmillan. 2005. ISBN 9781596430402.
- First Impressions. Macmillan. 2006. ISBN 9781596431171.

== Awards and recognition ==
- 1968 – Veronica Ganz – American Library Association Notable Book
- 1972 – The Bears' House – National Book Award finalist
- 1973 – A Pocket Full of Seeds – New York Times Outstanding Book of the Year
- 1991 – The Big Book for Peace (co-editor) – Jane Addams Children's Book Award
- American Jewish Library Award
