= Sheila Gordon =

American writer (1927–2013)

Sheila Gordon (January 22, 1927, in Johannesburg, South Africa – 2013) was an American writer who was born in South Africa. She wrote, among various other publications, Waiting for the Rain, The Middle of Somewhere, and Unfinished Business.

Waiting for the Rain tells the story of two boys growing up on a farm in South Africa during the Apartheid era. The friendship between the two boys dissipates as they grow older because one of them, who is black, seeks political equality, while the other boy, who is white, wants everything to stay the same.

Sheila lived in Cobble Hill, a small neighborhood in Brooklyn for over fifty years. She died on May 10, 2013, at the age of 86. Her husband of over 60 years, Harley Gordon, died three months later on August 8, 2013. They were survived by their three children and five grandchildren.
