= Waiting for the Rain (novel) =

1987 book by Sheila Gordon

- Bantom Starfire 1989 edition
- Author: Sheila Gordon
- Language: English
- Subject: South Africa, Apartheid
- Genre: Juvenile fiction
- Published: 1987
- Publication place: United States
- Media type: Print
- Pages: 214
- Awards: Jane Addams Children's Book Award
- ISBN: 9780553279115
- OCLC: 19725213

Waiting for the Rain is a young adult novel by South African-born American writer Sheila Gordon, first published in 1987. It tells the story of two boys, one black and one white, growing up on a farm in South Africa during apartheid. As the boys mature, their friendship dissipates because the black boy seeks political equality while the white boy wants everything to stay the same.

== Characters ==
Tengo is the main character of the book. He is a black South African child, around the age of ten when the book starts, and lives with his family in the kraal on the Oubaas's farm. He desperately seeks a way for whites and blacks to live equally, thereby ending apartheid. However, in Part Two of the book, he must choose which he wants more: to get an inferior education given by the whites, or to join the violent liberation with the majority of the black population.

Frikkie is Tengo's best friend at the beginning of the book. They have been friends from the time they could walk. He is a white Afrikaner and spends his school holidays at his uncle's farm, playing soccer and running around with Tengo. He wants everything to stay the same and does not accept change.

Oom Koos is the Oubaas, a senior, of the farm. He is Frikkie's uncle and oversees everything that goes on in the farm. He does not want the black protesters to gain power.

Tant Sannie is Frikkie's aunt and Oom Koos's wife. She thinks education is wasted on blacks, and is appalled by the idea of Tengo going to school in Johannesburg.

Selina is Tengo's mother. She does much of the housekeeping for Tant Sannie, such as washing the dishes and clothes, and preparing food for Oom Koos and Tant Sannie.

Timothy is Tengo's father. He is the boss-boy of the farm which means he was appointed by Oom Koos to manage the farm.

Tandi is Tengo's sister. She is constantly sick [has tuberculosis] and stays in the kraal.

Emma is Tengo's classmate. She helps Tengo in different subjects in school.

Joseph is Tengo's cousin (he is fourteen in Part One). He is the first one to introduce the reality of apartheid to Tengo, and later appears as a crucial turning point in Tengo's decisions about his life.

Sissie is Frikkie's sister who cannot abide life on the farm. She has been taught to accept apartheid. Constantly bothers Tengo to make him feel more like a servant. Real name is Henrietta.

Rev. Gilbert is a white liberal who tutors Tengo to help him pass his matriculation exams and get to college. Appears in Part Two.

Matilda is Selina's sister that works for the Millers as a housekeeper, like Selina.

Elijah is a teenage tribal South African who lives in the township of Johannesburg. Fights apartheid with violence.

Mrs. Miller is a white living in Johannesburg. She and her family, though nicer than other masters, still accept apartheid and do nothing to change it.

Claire Miller is the daughter of Mrs. Miller, a white liberal who feels sympathy for the blacks. However, she cannot do much to change it.

Lettie is Tengo's grandmother. Elijah is Tengo's friend who was put in jail for activism.

== Synopsis ==
=== Part One ===
When the book begins, Tengo and Frikkie are two young boys on Oom Koos's farm. Frikkie visits on holidays to escape the grinding boredom of the school term, and Tengo lives there with his family. Over time, Tengo comes to see more and more that their friendship is hesitant and tenuous due to the imposing laws of apartheid, and wants to know more. He cannot understand why Frikkie does not like school when there is so much to learn. He desperately wishes to go to the city and get an education. To quench his thirst for knowledge, Selina asks for books from Mrs. Miller. Tengo receives them and loves them, but they only make him want to know more.

Over the course of this book, Tengo is also learning more about apartheid and how it functions. His cousin Joseph, who lives in the squalid township of Johannesburg, visits one day and tells Tengo of the evils that must be faced every day there. Tengo's eyes are opened after this conversation, and through several more events, he is determined to go to Johannesburg to get an education. He gets permission and leaves for the city. He finds that the city is smelly and noisy like Frikkie said it would be.

=== Part Two ===
In Part 2 Tengo becomes a much more active member in the fight against the white regime. About four years later than Part One, Part Two details more closely on Tengo's life in Johannesburg, and only briefly visit Frikkie as he is serving his mandatory term in the army. Tengo is receiving tutoring from Rev. Gilbert and living with the Millers for a time. Soon, however, more and more protests break out in response to stricter rules set by the white government, and Tengo's school is shut down. He now has a choice to make: should he choose education and try to matriculate to college, or join the demonstrations against apartheid? He wants to continue his education but does not see how this is possible – at least not until Joseph returns and offers him a chance to go overseas and be schooled. Before Tengo sets out to leave, he is informed about a funeral held for the schoolchildren who were shot during riots. Once he arrives he sees the army trying to break up the funeral, and as he begins to fight back a gunshot is heard along with a scream. He runs and then is reunited with Frikkie, a current patron of the army. He accidentally hits him, and as he takes his gun he notices who the soldier was. They share good memories, and debate, but they split ways and keep their meeting – and their friendship – a secret.

=== Terms ===
- Oubaas means "old master"; Frikkie's uncle.
- Kleinbaas - "young master"; Frikkie is referred to as this by the black people who work on Oom Koos's farm.
- Kaffir - a derogatory term directed at native South Africans. Similar to nigger as used in the USA. Literally translated from Arabic, Kuffar means "non-believer".
- Piccanin - a slightly derogatory term meaning one who is young and/or foolish.
- Kraal - Small villages of mud huts for the blacks to live in.

== Reception ==
Gordon won the Jane Addams Children's Book Award in 1988 for this book. The New York Times review was less than favourable, saying that although the story is "balanced nicely," and "avoided the great pitfalls of such a story - caricature and sentiment", it left much to be desired:

The characters themselves, and their situations, often feel invented. A Novel of South Africa is the subtitle. One could add, for American Students, so obviously destined is this book for the American market. South African terms give way to American ones: mealies to corn, cross to mad and so forth. Glosses are supplied everywhere. There are, in addition, some serious discrepancies for the knowledgeable reader. How, for instance, does a black child growing up speaking Afrikaans as his white language come so easily to read and speak English from books?

— Lynn Freed, The New York Times review, December 1988.
