= Gwen Strauss =

American/French author

- Born: 1963 (age 62–63); Haiti
- Education: Hampshire College (BA); Wheelock College (MS)
- Occupations: Author, Director of Artists Residency Program at the Dora Maar House (Ménerbes, France)
- Notable work: The Nine, the true story of a band of women who survived the worst of Nazi Germany (2021) The Hiding Game (2017) Ruth and the Greenbook (2010)

Gwen Strauss (born 1963) is an American author living in France, and currently the Director of the Dora Maar Cultural Center in Ménerbes (France).

Strauss is the author of six books, including Ruth and the Greenbook (2010), six anthologies, numerous short essays and fictions, and poetry. Ruth and the Greenbook (2010) has been awarded numerous prizes. She has written two non-fiction books about WWII, The Nine (2021), about the true story of a group of women who survived the worst of Nazi Germany, and Milena and Margarete (2025), a love story in Ravensbrück.

== Early life ==
Strauss was born in Haiti, and spent her early childhood in Haiti and Malaysia. She was educated at Hampshire College (BA) and Wheelock College (MS). She has travelled extensively and in 1985 she studied Japanese language and culture at Friends World College in Kyoto.

== Career ==
In 1988-2022 Strauss was a freelance writer based primarily in France, writing on a wide range of topics such as taking a train to Uzbekistan, honor killing in Afghanistan, and family circuses in post-Cold-War Europe.

At Armstrong Atlantic State University in Savannah, Georgia Strauss was an adjunct professor in 2002, teaching english composition, and a Design Press Editor from 2002 to 2005.

From 2005 to 2007 Strauss was Director of the Lacoste Campus (Lacoste, France) of the Savannah College of Art and Design (SCAD).

From 2007 to 2020 Strauss was Director of the Brown Foundation Fellowship Program at the Dora Maar House in Ménerbes (France), and since 2020 she has been the Executive Director of the Dora Maar Cultural Center (Dora Maar House and Hotel de Tingry, Nancy B. Negley Foundation).

== Personal life ==
Strauss is divorced, and lives in Provence with her three children.

== Bibliography ==
=== Books ===
- Trail of Stones (1989). With illustrations by Anthony Browne. A collection of poems; Knopf, New York, 1989. Poems from this book have been widely anthologized. The book was transformed into a theatrical production by ESOC theater group and performed in Darmstaat Germany in 2013 and in Luxembourg in 2014.
- The Night Shimmy (1991). With illustrations by Anthony Browne. A children's picture book; Random House, New York, and Julia MacRae Books, London, as well as Canadian, Dutch, French, Japanese, Korean and German editions, 1991. Paperback reissue Picture Corgi Edition, 2003. E-book release, 2008.
- Ruth and the Greenbook (2010). With Calvin Ramsey and Floyd Collins. A children's picture book; Lerner, 2010.https://www.publishersweekly.com/pw/by-topic/childrens/childrens-book-news/article/79522-green-book-movie-lifts-up-sales-for-backlist-picture-book.html
- The Hiding Game (2017). Illustrated by Herb Leonard. A middle-grade reader; Pelican Publishing, 2017.
- The Nine, the true story of a band of women who survived the worst of Nazis Germany (2021), a narrative non-fiction book about the wartime experiences of the author's aunt, Helene Podliasky, a member of the French Resistance and escaped slave laborer. St. Martin's Press, with foreign editions in the UK, Canada, Italy, Finland, The Netherlands, Brazil, the Czech Republic, Japan, Poland, Lithuania, China and Hungary. A NewYork Times Bestseller in August 2025.
- Milena and Margarete, a Love Story in Ravensbrück (2025), a narrative non-fiction book about two extraordinary women of the 20th century. One was Milena Jesenska, Kafka's first translator and epistolary lover, non-conformist, bi-sexual feminist journalist, and when the time came, a leader in the effort to save Jewish refugees in Prague. The other was Margarete Buber-Neumann, who experienced both the Soviet gulag and the Nazi concentration camp Ravensbrück where she met and fell in love with Milena. St. martin's Press, with foreign editions in the UK, Czech Republic and France.

=== Anthologies ===
- The Trials & Tribulations of Little Red Riding Hood. Edited By Jack Zipes.
- The Year's Best Fantasy and Horror, Fourth Annual Collection (Ellen Datlow and Teri Windling, eds., Endicott) (1990).
- The Armless Maiden: And other Tales for Childhood's Survivors, Terri Windling, ed., St. Martin's Press, Inc., 1996.
- Anthology of Verse and Prose, The London Academy of Music and Dramatic Arts, 2003.
- English for the Australian Curriculum, Rita Van Haren, et al., Cambridge University Press, 2011.

=== Short Fictions and Essays ===
- The Lesson, Kenyon Review, winter 1991.
- Tongue of a Toad, Frank, summer 1992.
- Three Pigs, The Antioch Review, fall 1992.
- The Last Hired Man, Paris Transcontinental, #7 spring 1993, prizewinner.
- Conch Salad, Negative Capability, vol XIV #3, 1995.
- Oasis, Tampa Review, 1996.
- French Love Affair, New England Review, Spring 2000.
- The Reef, Catamaran Literary Reader, Fall 2014.
- Ice, and Take the Spaceship, Two Bridges, 2015, vol 4.
- Walter Benjamin's Last Hike, Catapult, 2018.

=== Poetry ===
- Fishing. Lake Effect vol 3#1, spring 1988.
- Endurance, Poetry Northwest, fall 1988.
- Deliverance, The Tidewater Patriot, 1988.
- Their Father, The New Republic, Dec. 12, 1988.
- The Drowning, Peaked Hill Trust Journal.
- Deliverance, Rituals of Number, Empty Mirror Press, winner poetry award.
- A Father speaks to his daughter, The Sag-Harbor Express, Nov. 24, 1988 #44.
- Crab Nebula, The Sag-Harbor Express, Jan. 5, 1989 #1.
- The Fox Witch, Waiting Wolf, The Grolier Poetry Prize, 1989 Runner-up.
- Tourists, Images, vol.14 #2 1990.
- Watermelons, Sun Dog, vol. 10 #1 1990.
- Grandmother's Garden, The Journal, spring/summer 1990.
- Pyromancy, Manhattan Poetry Review.
- Faith (In Spain), Company of Wolves, Pyromancy, The Vincent Brothers Review, June 1990.
- Annie's Math, Learning to Grieve, Southern Poetry Review, vol. 31#2 fall 1991.
- Dinosaurs Move in Herds, Phoebe, and winter 1993, runner-up Greg Grummer Award.
- Cyclops, Catholics for Free Choice, summer 1994.
- Too Near the Desert, Tooth, April 1995.
- Gated, Arecife, Frank, March 1998.
- Baking Pies, Atlanta Review, award winner, 2001.
- Parthenope, Convergence, April 2003.
- My Father Ate Shadows, Patterson Literary Review, honorable mention Allen Ginsberg Award.
- Cypris, Roger, nominated for Pushkart Prize 2007.
- Midnight Baker, Hives at the Maison Basse, Figbone, 2007.
- Doubt, Falcon, Figbone, 2008.
- Reading Kafka's Letters at Sea, Sou’wester, Spring 2014.
- Ella says, A theory of Equations, and Mare Tranquillitatis, Narrative, 2021.
