= Brian Pinkney =

American illustrator (born 1961)

Brian Pinkney (born August 28, 1961) is an American illustrator of children's books. He has received two Caldecott Honors, a Coretta Scott King Award, and the Boston Globe–Horn Book Award.

== Early life ==
Pinkney was born on August 28, 1961 in Boston, Massachusetts. His father, Jerry Pinkney, was also an illustrator and his mother, Gloria Jean, was an author, milliner, and silversmith. Both had studios in their home, and Pinkney was encouraged by his parents to use the materials in the studio.

Pinkney earned a Bachelor of Fine Arts degree from the Philadelphia College of Art in 1983. After working as a freelance illustrator for several years, he returned to college and earned a Master of Fine Arts degree in illustration from the School of Visual Arts in 1990.

== Career ==
As of 2019, Pinkney often works with his wife, Andrea Davis Pinkney of children's books. Between them, have published over seventy children's books. Pinkney has won two Caldecott Honors, four Coretta Scott King Honors and a Coretta Scott King Award, and the Boston Globe Horn Book Award.

His artworks have been exhibited at the Art Institute of Chicago, the Cleveland Museum of Art, the Detroit Institute of Art.

== Personal life ==
Pinkney is lives with his wife Andrea Davis Pinkney and their two children in Brooklyn, New York.

== Honors and awards ==
=== Caldecott Honors ===
- The Faithful Friend (1997)
- Duke Ellington: The Piano Prince and His Orchestra (1999)

=== Coretta Scott King Illustrator Award ===
- In the Time of the Drums (2000)

=== Coretta Scott King Illustrator Honor ===
- Sukey and the Mermaid (1993)
- The Faithful Friend (1997)
- Duke Ellington: The Piano Prince and His Orchestra (1999)

=== Boston Globe Horn Book Award ===
- The Adventures of Sparrowboy (1997)
