= Getting Away with Murder: The True Story of the Emmett Till Case =

2003 book by Chris Crowe

- First edition cover
- Author: Chris Crowe
- Language: English
- Published: 2003
- Publisher: Dial Books for Young Readers
- Publication place: United States
- Pages: 128

Getting Away with Murder: The True Story of the Emmett Till Case is a 2003 young adult non-fiction book by American author Chris Crowe. The book details the history of Emmett Till, a teenaged African-American boy, who was abducted and murdered after offending a white woman at a grocery store. The book was positively received and won an American Library Association award for Best Book for Young Adults in 2004 and the Jane Addams Peace Association Honor Book Award for Older Children.

== Synopsis ==
In August 1955 in Mississippi, Emmett Till, an African-American teenager from Chicago, was visiting his family in the South. After reportedly making advances at a married, white woman at a store while with his friends, Till was abducted by white men and brutally murdered. After a brief trial, the men were acquitted. They later confessed to the crime with impunity because they could not be tried twice for the same crime. The murder of Till caused outrage and ignited the Civil Rights Movement in the United States.

== Publication ==
Author Chris Crowe became acquainted with the story of Emmett Till while researching for his book Presenting Mildred D. Taylor. One of Taylor's essays mentioned the Till murder which interested Crowe. Crowe researched the Till case after he finished the Taylor book and interviewed Till's mother over the telephone for some of the information in the book. The book was published in 2003 by Dial Books for Young Readers. The book contains original case material and over 40 contextual photographs as well as direct quotations from historical news articles and first-person accounts. It was revised and updated in 2018 with new information that was not available at the time of original publication.

== Reception ==
The book received positive reviews. Publishers Weekly said the author "pays a powerful tribute to a boy whose untimely death spurred a national chain of events". The Chicago Tribune stated that "the explanation of the bravery of Emmett's mother, family and friends in testifying at the trial and calling world attention to it is especially well done", stating that though readers may know the story of Till, Crowe adds "cultural and human contexts". The Cooperative Children's Book Center wrote, "Author Chris Crowe succinctly recounts the story based largely on news accounts of the time and published interviews with many of the key players."

== Awards ==
The book won an American Library Association award for Best Book for Young Adults in 2004. The same year, it won the Jane Addams Peace Association Honor Book Award for Older Children.
