= Chris Crowe (author) =

American author and professor

Chris Crowe (born c. 1954 in Danville, Illinois) is an American professor of English and English education at Brigham Young University (BYU) specializing in young adult literature. In addition to his academic work, Crowe also writes nonfiction and novels for young-adult readers, including the award-winning Mississippi Trial, 1955. He retired from BYU on January 1, 2026, and is now a full-time writer.

Crowe attended junior high and high school in Tempe, Arizona, and graduated from McClintock High School. He was a Catholic while growing up but joined the Church of Jesus Christ of Latter-day Saints after high school. He attended Brigham Young University on a football scholarship from 1972 to 1976 and played in the 1974 Fiesta Bowl. He graduated from BYU with a BA in English, and he later earned an M.Ed. in 1980 and an Ed.D. in English education from Arizona State University in 1986.

Crowe taught English and coached football and track at McClintock High School in Tempe, Arizona, from 1977 to 1983 and from 1984 to 1987.

Prior to joining BYU's English department in 1993, Crowe had been a professor at Himeji Dokkyo University and Brigham Young University Hawaii.

In 2007, Crowe was awarded the Karl G. Maeser Excellence in Research and Creative Arts Award from BYU and in 2008 was awarded the Nan Osmond Grass Professorship in English. In November 2010, he received the Ted Hipple Service Award from the Assembly on Literature for Adolescents of the NCTE (ALAN). For the 2016–2017 school year Crowe received BYU's Karl G. Maeser Excellence in Teaching Award. He received BYU's highest faculty honor, the Karl G. Maeser Distinguished Lecturer Award, in August 2020 and delivered the annual Karl G. Maeser Lecture in May 2021. The Association for Mormon Letters awarded him their Lifetime Achievement Award in July 2024.

Crowe is a Latter-day Saint and recently served as the first counselor in the Provo Utah Edgemont South Stake presidency.

== Writings ==
Crowe has published many articles and book chapters about young adult literature. He has been a contributor or editor of a wide variety of journals including Medical English and English Journal. He has also written articles on general trends in young adult literature including the chapter “Mormon Values in Young Adult Literature,” in The Last Taboo: Spirituality in Young Adult Literature (Lanham, MD: Scarecrow Press, 2015).

Books he has written include From the Outside Looking In: Short Stories for LDS Teenagers and Fatherhood, Football and Turning Forty: Confessions of a Middle-Aged Mormon Male, Presenting Mildred D. Taylor, Teaching the Selected Works of Mildred D. Taylor, Getting Away with Murder: The True Story of the Emmett Till Case (2003), --with a revised and updated edition released in 2018-- and Up Close: Thurgood Marshall. Crowe edited with Jesse S. Crisler the 2007 BYU Press publication How I Came to Write: LDS Authors for Young Adults. His most recent academic publication was "A History of Young Adult Literature," the lead chapter in The Oxford Handbook of Young Adult Literature (2026).

His debut novel, Mississippi Trial, 1955 (2002), won several awards including the International Reading Association's Young Adult Novel Award. In 2012 he had his first children's book published Just As Good: How Larry Doby Changed America's Game. In 2014 his novel Death Coming Up the Hill was published by Houghton Mifflin Harcourt. This book deals with racism and the Vietnam War and is written in 976 haiku stanzas, with a syllable for every American soldier killed in Vietnam in 1968. It won the 2014 Whitney Award for Young Adult fiction and was named to the American Librarian Association's Best Fiction for Young Adults in 2016.
