= The Night Diary =

2018 young adult by Veera Hiranandani

- Author: Veera Hiranandani
- Cover artist: Kelley Brady
- Language: English
- Set in: 1947, Pakistan / India
- Publisher: Penguin Random House
- Publication date: March 6, 2018
- Pages: 272
- Awards: 2019 Newbery Honor
- ISBN: 9780735228528
- Website: Publisher's website

The Night Diary is a young adult novel written by American writer Veera Hiranandani and published by Penguin Random House in 2018. It is set in 1947, during the months before and after the independence of India and subsequent partition, and is written as diary entries from the perspective of Nisha, a girl who has just celebrated her twelfth birthday along with her twin brother, Amil.

== Plot summary ==
Journey of The Night Diary
1 Mirpur Khas
2 Umerkot
3 Jodhpur

The Night Diary is set around this time of partition and separated into two different countries. The story is told through the eyes of a 12-year-old, Nisha, the protagonist of the story. The novel opens on July 14, 1947; it is the twins' twelfth birthday, and to celebrate, their father has gifted Nisha another piece of gold jewelry from her mother's collection and given her brother Amil an illustrated book of tales from the Mahabharata. The day also marks the sad anniversary of their mother's death in childbirth. Aside from their father, a medical doctor, and the twins, the household includes their paternal grandmother, Dadi, and their cook, Kazi Syed; they live together in a compound in Mirpur Khas. The story takes place in West Pakistan soon to become Pakistan after East Pakistan becomes independent and known as Bangladesh.

July 1947 is just a month before independence from the British Raj, and Nisha also receives a diary from Kazi, the family's cook, as a birthday gift. The Britishers were leaving and Half-Muslim, half-Hindu twelve-year-old Nisha doesn't know where she belongs, or what her country is anymore. As the impending partition of India along religious lines becomes inevitable following independence, the household is forced to divide (Kazi is Muslim) while the rest of the family identifies as Hindu, although the twins' mother (who was Muslim) moved to Jodhpur. When Papa decides it's too dangerous to stay in what is now Pakistan, Nisha and her family become refugees and embark first by train but later on foot to reach her new home. The journey is long, difficult, and dangerous, and after losing her mother as a baby, Nisha can't imagine losing her homeland, too. But even if her country has been ripped apart, Nisha still believes in the possibility of putting herself back together.

Even though fear and tension are on the rise, Nisha doesn't forget to write to her mother via the eponymous diary even in this chaos. The novel details their journey and hardships. She notes down altering landscape which she sees with her innocent eyes as the grief, confusion, tension, fear, anger, distress, and about the horrors of the reality. The story has been fictionalized as is mentioned by the author at the end of the book based on the real-life events that happened during the time of partition in 1947.

== Development ==
Hiranandani's father experienced Partition as a nine-year-old boy; although his journey was also from Mirpur Khas to Jodhpur, the specific experiences of Nisha and her family are fictionalized.

Her family is an inspiration for her fiction writing. Her father was nine when he had to leave his home during the Partition. Hiranandani grew up hearing the real-life incidents of partition from her father, uncles, and aunts–that several weeks after India's Independence, her father, his four brothers and sisters, and his mother decided to leave Pakistan and made it over the new border by train. Her grandfather was a doctor by profession in the Mirpur Khas city hospital and he left behind up to find a replacement, but a few weeks after, he decided to leave anyway because he was worried about his family. They lost their community to start a fresh life.

In addition, the scholars and Partition writings like Yasmin Khan's The Great Partition, Khushwant Singh's Train to Pakistan, Urvashi Butalia's The Other Side of Silence, Bapsi Sidhwa's Cracking India, Salman Rushdie's Midnight's Children, and Nisid Hajari's Midnight's Furies are inspiration for Veera Hiranandani's Partition fiction writing.

== Reception ==
=== Awards ===
In 2019, the American Library Association named The Night Diary to its list of Newbery Honor winners, alongside Catherine Gilbert Murdock's The Book of Boy.

The Night Diary (Kokila) also received the 2019 Walter Dean Myers Honor Award and the 2018 Malka Penn Award for Human Rights in Children's Literature.
