= Deborah Hopkinson =

American writer of children's books

- Born: February 4, 1952 (age 73); Lowell, Massachusetts
- Occupation: Author
- Spouse: Andrew D. Thomas
- Children: 2
- Website: deborahhopkinson.com

Deborah Hopkinson (born February 4, 1952) is an American writer of over seventy children's books, primarily historical fiction, nonfiction and picture books.

== Personal life and education ==
Hopkinson was born February 4, 1952, in Lowell, Massachusetts to Russell W. and Gloria D. Hopkinson.

She received a Bachelor of Arts from the University of Massachusetts Amherst in 1973 and a Master of Arts from the University of Hawaiʻi in 1978.

Hopkinson is married to Andrew D. Thomas, and the couple has two children: Rebekah and Dimitri. She presently lives near Portland, Oregon.

== Career ==
Before writing full-time, Hopkinson worked as a philanthropic fundraiser with Oregon State University, Whitman College, and the University of Hawaiʻi at Mānoa. From 1981 to 1984, she served as the marketing director for the Manoa Valley Theater in Honolulu. Afterwards, she worked as a development director at the University of Hawaiʻi Foundation (1985 to 1989), then the East–West Center in Honolulu (1989 to 1994). For the next decade, she was the director of grants at Whitman College in Walla Walla, Washington, after which she served as the director for foundation relations for the Oregon State University Foundation in Corvallis, Oregon.

Hopkinson published her first book in 1993 and has since published more than 70 books for children, including the Sibert Honor title, Titanic: Voices from the Disaster.

== Awards and honors ==
Twenty-three of Hopkinson's books are Junior Library Guild selections:

- A Band of Angels (May 1995)
- Birdie’s Lighthouse (September 1997)
- Bluebird Summer (June 2001)
- Fannie in the Kitchen (September 2001)
- Girl Wonder (May 2003)
- Apples to Oregon (November 2004)
- Up Before Daybreak (August 2006)
- Abe Lincoln Crosses a Creek (November 2008)
- Home on the Range (January 2009)
- Stagecoach Sal (February 2009)
- A Boy Called Dickens (February 2012)
- Titanic (April 2012)
- Annie and Helen (November 2012)
- Knit Your Bit (April 2013)
- The Great Trouble (January 2014)
- A Bandit’s Tale (June 2016)
- Steamboat School (August 2016)
- Dive! World War II Stories of Sailors & Submarines in the Pacific (November 2016)
- D-Day: The World War II Invasion That Changed History (October 2018)
- Carter Reads the Newspaper (February 2019)
- Deadliest Hurricanes Then and Now (April 2022)
- The Story of a Story (June 2022)
- The Deadliest Fires Then and Now (October 2022)

In 2012, Titanic: Voices from the Disaster was named one of the best nonfiction children's books of the year by The Horn Book Magazine.

In 2017, Booklist included Steamboat School on their "Top 10 Historical Fiction for Youth" list.

In 2019, Carter Reads the Newspaper was named one of the best books of the year by the Chicago Public Library and the New York Public Library.

The Story of a Story was included in the Cooperative Children’s Book Center Choices 2021.

Awards for Hopkinson's writing
Year	Title	Award	Result	Ref.
1994	Sweet Clara and the Freedom Quilt	International Reading Association Book Award for Younger Readers	Winner	
2000	A Band of Angels	ALSC Notable Children's Book	Selection	
2000	A Band of Angels	Golden Kite Award for Picture Book Text	Winner	
2000	A Band of Angels	Jane Addams Children's Book Award: Picture Book	Honor	
2004	Girl Wonder	Jane Addams Children's Book Award: Picture Book	Honor	
2004	Shutting Out the Sky	Jane Addams Children's Book Award: Book for Older Children	Honor	
2004	Shutting Out the Sky	NCTE Orbis Pictus Award	Honor	
2005	Apples to Oregon	ALSC Notable Children's Book	Selection	
2005	Apples to Oregon	Golden Kite Award for Picture Book Text	Winner	
2005	Apples to Oregon	Spur Award for Storyteller	Winner	
2006	Sky Boys	Boston Globe–Horn Book Award	Honor	
2007	Up Before Daybreak	Carter G. Woodson Book Award: Middle Level	Honor	
2008	Abe Lincoln Crosses A Creek	Cybils Award for Fiction Picture book	Finalist	
2009	Abe Lincoln Crosses A Creek	ALSC Notable Children's Book	Selection	
2009–2010	Keep On!	Eloise Jarvis McGraw Award for Children's Literature	Winner	
2012	Titanic: Voices From the Disaster	Cybils Award for Nonfiction Middle Grade & Young Adult	Finalist	
2012	Titanic: Voices From the Disaster	Oregon Spirit Award for Nonfiction	Honor	
2013	The Great Trouble	Oregon Spirit Award for Middle Reader	Winner	
2013	Knit Your Bit	Oregon Spirit Award for Picture Books	Winner	
2013	Annie and Helen	Eloise Jarvis McGraw Award for Children's Literature	Finalist	
2013	A Boy Called Dickens	Eloise Jarvis McGraw Award for Children's Literature	Nominee	
2013	Titanic: Voices from the Disaster	ALSC Notable Children's Book	Selection	
2013	Titanic: Voices from the Disaster	Eloise Jarvis McGraw Award for Children's Literature	Nominee	
2013	Titanic: Voices from the Disaster	Sibert Medal	Honor	
2013	Titanic: Voices from the Disaster	YALSA Award for Excellence in Nonfiction	Finalist	
2014	Knit Your Bit	Eloise Jarvis McGraw Award for Children's Literature	Finalist	
2015	Courage & Defiance	Oregon Spirit Award for Nonfiction	Winner	
2015	The Great Trouble	Eloise Jarvis McGraw Award for Children's Literature	Finalist	
2016	Courage & Defiance	NCTE Orbis Pictus Award	Recommended	
2016	Dive!	Oregon Spirit Award for Nonfiction	Honor	
2016	The Great Trouble	Mathical	Honor	
2016	Steamboat School	Booklist Editors' Choice: Books for Youth	Selection	
2017	A Bandit’s Tale	Leslie Bradshaw Award for Young Adult Literature	Nominee	
2017	A Bandit’s Tale	NCTE Charlotte Huck Award	Recommended	
2017	Beatrix Potter and the Unfortunate Tale of a Borrowed Guinea Pig	Eloise Jarvis McGraw Award for Children's Literature	Nominee	
2017	Courage & Defiance	Leslie Bradshaw Award for Young Adult Literature	Finalist	
2017	Dive!	NCTE Orbis Pictus Award	Recommended	
2017	Follow the Moon Home	Green Book Award for Picture Book	Winner	
2017	Steamboat School	Association for Library Service to Children Notable Children's Book	Selection	
2017	Steamboat School	Eloise Jarvis McGraw Award for Children's Literature	Finalist	
2017	Steamboat School	Jane Addams Children's Book Award: Book for Younger Children	Winner	
2018	Dive!	Leslie Bradshaw Award for Young Adult Literature	Nominee	
2018	Independence Cake	Eloise Jarvis McGraw Award for Children's Literature	Nominee	
2018	A Letter to my Teacher	Eloise Jarvis McGraw Award for Children's Literature	Nominee	
2019	Carter Reads the Newspaper	Oregon Spirit Award for Nonfiction	Honor	
2019	D-Day: The World War II Invasion That Changed History	YALSA Award for Excellence in Nonfiction	Nominee	
2019	Ordinary, Extraordinary Jane Austen	Eloise Jarvis McGraw Award for Children's Literature	Finalist	
2020	Butterflies Belong Here	Oregon Spirit Award for Picture Books	Honor	
2020	Carter Reads the Newspaper	ALSC Notable Children's Book	Selection	
2020	Carter Reads the Newspaper	Carter G. Woodson Book Award: Elementary Level	Honor	
2020	Carter Reads the Newspaper	Eloise Jarvis McGraw Award for Children's Literature	Finalist	
2020	How I Became a Spy	Leslie Bradshaw Award for Young Adult Literature	Winner	
2020	Under the Bodhi Tree	Independent Publisher Bronze Award for Children’s Picture Books		
2021	Butterflies Belong Here	Eloise Jarvis McGraw Award for Children's Literature	Finalist	
2021	Butterflies Belong Here	Green Book Award	Winner	
2021	We Had to Be Brave	Leslie Bradshaw Award for Young Adult Literature	Finalist	
2021	We Had to Be Brave	NCTE Orbis Pictus Award	Recommended	
2022	We Must Not Forget	Leslie Bradshaw Award for Young Adult Literature	Finalist	
2022	We Must Not Forget	NCTE Orbis Pictus Award	Recommended	

== Selected books ==
=== Picture books ===
- Fannie in the Kitchen: The Whole Story from Soup to Nuts of How Fannie Farmer Invented Recipes with Precise Measurements, illustrated by Nancy Carpenter. Atheneum, 2001.

=== Early Readers ===
- Birdie’s Lighthouse, illustrated by Kimberly Bulcken Root (1997)
- Maria’s Comet, illustrated by Deborah Lanino (1999)
- A Band of Angels, illustrated by Raúl Colón (2002)
- Girl Wonder: A Baseball Story in Nine Innings, illustrated by Terry Widener (2003)
- Apples to Oregon: Being the (Slightly) True Narrative of How a Brave Pioneer Father Brought Apples, Peaches, Pears, Plums, Grapes, and Cherries (and Children) Across the Plains, illustrated by Nancy Carpenter (2004)
- Abe Lincoln Crosses a Creek: A Tall Thin Tale, illustrated by John Hendrix (2008)
- Annie and Helen, illustrated by Raúl Colón (2012)
- Knit Your Bit: A World War I Story, illustrated by Steven Guarnaccia (2013)
- Philippe Cousteau illustrated by Meilo So (2016)
- Beatrix Potter and the Unfortunate Tale of a Borrowed Guinea Pig, illustrated by Charlotte Voake (2016)
- A Letter to My Teacher, illustrated by Nancy Carpenter (2017)
- Under the Bodhi Tree: A Story of the Buddha, illustrated by Kailey Whitman (2018)
- Ordinary, Extraordinary Jane Austen: The Story of Six Novels, Three Notebooks, a Writing Box, and One Clever Girl, illustrated by Qin Leng (2018)
- Butterflies Belong Here: A Story of One Idea, Thirty Kids, and a World of Butterflies, illustrated by Meilo So (2020)
- My Little Golden Book about Dolly Parton (2021)
- My Little Golden Book about Betty White (2021)
- The Story of a Story, illustrated by Hadley Hooper (2021)
- Cinderella and a Mouse Called Fred, illustrated by Paul O. Zelinsky (2023)
- Happy Earth Day! (2023)

=== Middle Grade ===
- Hear My Sorrow: The Diary of Angela Denoto, A Shirtwaist Worker, New York City, 1909 (2004)
- The Great Trouble: A Mystery of London, the Blue Death, and a Boy Called Eel (2013)
- Courage & Defiance: Stories of Spies, Saboteurs, and Survivors in World War II Denmark (2015)
- A Bandit’s Tale: The Muddled Misadventures of a Pickpocket (2016)
- Dive!: World War II Stories of Sailors & Submarines in the Pacific (2016)
- D‑Day: The World War II Invasion That Changed History (2018)
- The Deadliest Diseases Then and Now (2021)
- We Must Not Forget: Holocaust Stories of Survival and Resistance (2021)
- The Deadliest Fires Then and Now (2022)
- The Deadliest Hurricanes Then and Now (2022)
