= 12th Scripps National Spelling Bee =

Spelling bee held in the United States in 1936

12th National Spelling Bee
- Date: May 26, 1936
- Location: National Museum in Washington, D.C.
- Winner: Jean Trowbridge (13 at time of win)
- Sponsor: The Des Moines Register and Tribune
- Sponsor location: Des Moines, Iowa
- Winning word: eczema
- No. of contestants: 17
- Pronouncer: H.E. Warner and Harold F. Harding

The 12th National Spelling Bee was held in Washington, D.C., on May 26, 1936, at the National Museum.

The winner was Jean Trowbridge, age 13, of Stuart, Iowa, with the word eczema. Thirteen-year-old Bruce Ackerman, of Tazewell County, Illinois, who took 3rd the prior year, came in second. Catherine Davis, 13, of Indiana took third, falling on "shrieking."

In the final rounds, Trowbridge was first disqualified for "numskull," which Ackerman then spelled as "numbskull" followed by "gnome" for the apparent win. The judges then realized that "numskull" was an acceptable spelling, and the contest continued. Ackerman misspelled "predilection" a few words later, which Trowbridge spelled correctly followed by "eczema" for the win.

The final hour of the competition was broadcast on radio on the Columbia broadcasting system.

In 2014, winner Jean Trowbridge (married name Tyler) was living in Grand Junction, Colorado. She died in 2020 at the age of 98.

== First Black finalists ==
MacNolia Cox, a 13-year-old girl from Akron, Ohio, and Elizabeth Kenny, a 15-year-old from Plainfield, New Jersey, were the first African-American children to compete as finalists in the National Spelling Bee. Cox placed 5th after misspelling "nemesis" and Kenny, after missing "appellation," placed 7th.

Due to segregation, Cox had to move into a black-only train car when she crossed into Maryland, and was unable to stay at the Willard Hotel with the other spellers. Cox and her mother were also placed at a separate table at the contestants' banquet. Cox's schoolteacher and newspaper sponsor representative, who were both white, engaged in what the Baltimore Afro-American described as a "long and heated argument", contending that "nemesis" was a proper noun (Nemesis being a Greek goddess of retribution). The chairman explained that the word was in frequent use as a common noun, and that the definition he'd given Cox was "fate." He appealed to the judges, who agreed and ruled against Cox. According to "family lore" and subsequent speculation, Cox lost as the result of racism, although such claims were denied at the time and remain unproven.

In 2004, poet A. Van Jordan published M-A-C-N-O-L-I-A, a book of poems written as if from the perspective of different people in Cox's life, imagining her as a brilliant but tragic figure crushed by racism. Inspired by Jordan's book, Carole Boston Weatherford, a writer and critic known for controversial claims that Pokémon character Jynx was racist and "an obese drag queen" version of Little Black Sambo, published a children's picture book about Cox titled How Do You Spell Unfair? in 2023.
