= Floyd Cooper =

Floyd Cooper may refer to:

- Floyd Cooper (Canadian football), official in the Canadian Football League
- Floyd Cooper (illustrator), American illustrator of children's books
