= Frank Morrison (illustrator) =

American illustrator (born 1971)

- Born: 1971 (age 54–55); Boston, Massachusetts, USA
- Occupation: Illustrator
- Writing career
- Period: 1991–present
- Notable works: The Roots of Rap (2019); How Do You Spell Unfair? (2023)
- Notable awards: John Steptoe Award for New Talent (2005); Coretta Scott King Illustrator Honor (2015, 2019); Crystal Kite Award (2017); Coretta Scott King Award (2021, 2023)
- Website: frankmorrison.art

Frank Morrison (born 1971) is an American illustrator of children's literature and graffiti artist.

Before becoming an illustrator, Morrison travelled globally as a breakdancer with The Sugarhill Gang.

Morrison published his first book, Brenda C. Roberts's Jazzy Miz Mozetta, with Farrar, Straus and Giroux in 2004. His illustrations for the book won him the 2005 John Steptoe Award for New Talent (Illustrator). He has since illustrated over 35 published, including fiction and non-fiction picture books, books for early readers, and middle grade books. In 2022, he published his debut book as a writer and illustrator, Kick Push, with Bloomsbury USA. Since publishing his first book, he has received many awards and honors, including winning a Crystal Kite Award and two Coretta Scott King Awards in addition to the John Steptoe Award.

As of 2024, Morrison lives with his wife and five children in Atlanta.

== Awards and honors ==
Fourteen of Morrison's books are Junior Library Guild selections: ¡Jonron! (Out of the Ballpark) (2007); Keena Ford and the Second Grade Mix-Up (2008); Keena Ford and the Secret Journal Mix-Up (2010); Long Shot (2010); The Quickest Kid in Clarksville (2016); How Sweet the Sound (2018); March Forward, Girl (2018); Starstruck (2018); The Roots of Rap (2019); Above the Rim (2020); Kick Push (2022); Uncle John's City Garden (2022); How Do You Spell Unfair? (2023); and My Block Looks Like (2024).

In 2015, the Association for Library Service to Children (ALSC) included Little Melba and Her Big Trombone on their list of the year's Notable Children's Books.

In 2016, Booklist included The Quickest Kid in Clarksville on their list of the "Top 10 Sports Books for Youth".

In 2017, Clayton Byrd Goes Underground was on Booklist's list of the "Top 10 Arts Books for Youth". The following year, they included it on their "Top 10 Diverse Fiction for Older and Middle Readers" list, and the ALSC named it among the year's Notable Children Books.

In 2018, Booklist included How Sweet the Sound on their "Top 10 Religion & Spirituality for Youth" list. The same year, the New York Public Library named March Forward, Girl among the best books of the year. The following year, the ALSC named both March Forward, Girl and Let the Children March among the year's Notable Children's Books.

In 2019, The Roots of Rap was named one of the best books of the year by the Chicago Public Library, Kirkus Reviews, and the New York Public Library. Booklist also included it on their list of the "Top 10 Arts Books for Youth".

In 2020, Booklist included R-E-S-P-E-C-T on their list of the "Top 10 Arts Books for Youth". The same year, they included Above the Rim on their "Booklist Editors' Choice: Books for Youth" list. The following year, it was on Booklist's "Top 10 Sports Books for Youth" list, and the ALSC named it a Notable Children's Book.

In 2023, Booklist included Breaking to the Beat! on their lists of the "Top 10 Sports Books for Youth" and "Top 10 Arts Books for Youth". The same year, they included How Do You Spell Unfair? on their "Booklist Editors' Choice: Books for Youth" list. Kirkus Reviews also named it among the best picture books of 2023, and Bank Street College of Education named it a book of outstanding merit for children ages five to nine in 2024. That year, the ALSC and International Literacy Association (CL/R SIG) named it a notable children's book, and Booklist named it among the "Top 10 History Books for Youth".

Awards for Morrison's books and illustrations
Year	Title	Award	Result	Ref.
2005	Jazzy Miz Mozetta	John Steptoe Award for New Talent (Illustrator)	Won	
2015	I Got Rhythm	CLEL Bell Picture Book Awards for Sing	Won	
2015	Little Melba and Her Big Trombone	Coretta Scott King Award for Illustrator	Honor	
2015	Little Melba and Her Big Trombone	NAACP Image Award for Outstanding Literary Work – Children	Finalist	
2015	Little Melba and Her Big Trombone	Orbis Pictus Award	Nominated	
2017	Clayton Byrd Goes Underground	Crystal Kite Award for Midwest	Won	
2017	Clayton Byrd Goes Underground	National Book Award for Young People's Literature	Finalist	
2017	One Last Word	Boston Globe–Horn Book Award for Fiction	Honor	
2019	Let the Children March	Coretta Scott King Award for Illustrator	Honor	
2020	The Roots of Rap	Golden Kite Award for Picture Book Illustration	Honor	
2021	R-E-S-P-E-C-T	Coretta Scott King Award for Illustrator	Won	
2021	The Secret Garden of George Washington Carver	NAACP Image Award for Outstanding Literary Work – Children	Finalist	
2023	Standing in the Need of Prayer	Boston Globe–Horn Book Award for Picture Book	Honor	
2023	Standing in the Need of Prayer	Coretta Scott King Award for Illustrator	Won	
2023	Standing in the Need of Prayer	Golden Kite Award for Picture Book Illustration	Finalist	
2024	How Do You Spell Unfair?	Jane Addams Children's Book Award	Finalist	

== Publications ==
=== As author ===
==== Picture books (fiction) ====
- Kick Push. Bloomsbury. 2022. ISBN 978-1-5476-0592-7.

=== As illustrator ===
==== Early reader (fiction) ====
- Thomson, Melissa (2008). Keena Ford and the Second Grade Mix Up. Dial Books. ISBN 978-0-803-73263-6.
- Thomson, Melissa (2010). Keena Ford and the Secret Journal Mix-Up. Dial Books. ISBN 978-0-803-73465-4.

==== Early reader (nonfiction) ====
- Weinstein, Muriel Harris (2010). Play, Louis, Play!: The True Story of a Boy and His Horn. Bloomsbury. ISBN 978-1-599-90375-0.
- Smith Jr., Charles R. (2012). Stars in the Shadows: The Negro League All-Star Game of 1934. Atheneum Books for Young Readers. ISBN 978-0-689-86638-8.
- DePrince, Michaela; DePrince, Elaine (2014). Ballerina Dreams: From Orphan to Dancer. Random House Books for Young Readers. ISBN 978-0-385-75515-3.

==== Middle grade (fiction) ====
- Williams-Garcia, Rita (2017). Clayton Byrd Goes Underground. Quill Tree Books. ISBN 978-0-062-21591-8.
- Zoboi, Ibi (2019). My Life as an Ice Cream Sandwich. Dutton Books for Young Readers. ISBN 978-0-399-18735-3.

==== Middle grade (nonfiction) ====
- Grimes, Nikki (2017). One Last Word: Wisdom from the Harlem Renaissance. Bloomsbury. ISBN 978-1-619-63554-8.
- Beals, Melba Pattillo (2018). March Forward, Girl: From Young Warrior to Little Rock Nine. Clarion Books. ISBN 978-1-328-88212-7.

==== Picture books (fiction) ====
- Roberts, Brenda C. (2004). Jazzy Miz Mozetta. Farrar, Straus and Giroux. ISBN 978-0-374-33674-5.
- Taylor, Debbie A. (2004). Sweet Music in Harlem. Lee & Low. ISBN 978-1-58430-165-3.
- Norman, Lissette (2006). My Feet Are Laughing. Farrar, Straus and Giroux. ISBN 978-0-374-35096-3.
- Queen Latifah (2006). Queen of the Scene. HarperCollins. ISBN 978-0-06-077856-9.
- Rodriguez, Alex (2007). Out of the Ballpark. HarperCollins. ISBN 978-0-06-115197-2.
- Abrahams, Peter (2011). Quacky Baseball. HarperCollins. ISBN 978-0-06-122978-7.
- Barrett, Mary Brigid (2011). Shoebox Sam. Zonderkidz. ISBN 978-0-310-71549-8.
- Schofield-Morrison, Connie (2014). I Got the Rhythm. Bloomsbury. ISBN 978-1-619-63178-6.
- Miller, Pat Zietlow (2017). The Quickest Kid in Clarksville. Chronicle. ISBN 978-1-4521-2936-5.
- London, C. Alexander (2018). The Adventures of Wrong Man and Power Girl!. Philomel Books. ISBN 978-0-399-54893-2.
- Schofield-Morrison, Connie (2020). I Got the School Spirit. Bloomsbury. ISBN 978-1-5476-0261-2.
- Harper, Janelle (2020). My Block Looks Like. Viking Press. ISBN 978-0-593-52630-9.
- Ford, Bernette G. (2022). Uncle John's City Garden. Holiday House. ISBN 978-0-8234-4786-2.
- Acevedo, Linda J. (2023). Breaking to the Beat!. Lee & Low Books. ISBN 978-164-379639-0.

==== Picture books (nonfiction) ====
- Taylor, Gaylia (2006). George Crum and the Saratoga Chip. Lee & Low Books. ISBN 978-1-584-30255-1.
- Paul, Chris (2009). Long Shot: Never Too Small to Dream Big. Simon & Schuster Books for Young Readers. ISBN 978-1-4169-5079-0.
- Pelé (2010). For the Love of Soccer!. Little, Brown Books for Young Readers. ISBN 978-1-423-11538-0.
- Russell-Brown, Katheryn (2014). Little Melba and Her Big Trombone. Lee & Low Books. ISBN 978-1-600-60898-8.
- Barretta, Gene (2017). Muhammad Ali: A Champion Is Born. Katherine Tegen Books. ISBN 978-0-06-243016-8.
- Weatherford, Carole Boston (2018). How Sweet the Sound: The Story of Amazing Grace. Illustrated by Frank Morrison. Atheneum Books for Young Readers. ISBN 978-1-48-147206-7.
- Clark-Robinson, Monica (2018). Let the Children March. Clarion Books. ISBN 978-0-544-70452-7.
- Weatherford, Carole Boston (2018). The Roots of Rap: 16 Bars on the 4 Pillars of Hip-Hop. little bee books. ISBN 978-1499804119.
- Krull, Kathleen; Brewer, Paul (2018). Starstruck: The Cosmic Journey of Neil deGrasse Tyson. Crown Books for Young Readers. ISBN 978-0-399-55024-9.
- Bryant, Jen (2020). Above the Rim: How Elgin Baylor Changed Basketball. Harry N. Abrams. ISBN 978-1-4197-4108-1.
- Barretta, Gene (2020). The Secret Garden of George Washington Carver. HarperCollins. ISBN 978-0-06-243015-1.
- Weatherford, Carole Boston (2020). R-E-S-P-E-C-T: Aretha Franklin, the Queen of Soul. Atheneum Books for Young Readers. ISBN 978-1-534-45228-2.
- Weatherford, Carole Boston (2022). Standing in the Need of Prayer: A Modern Retelling of the Classic Spiritual. Crown Books for Young Readers. ISBN 978-0-59-330634-5.
- Datcher, Michael (2023). Harlem at Four. Random House Studio. ISBN 978-0-5934-2933-4.
- Weatherford, Carole Boston (2023). How Do You Spell Unfair? MacNolia Cox and the National Spelling Bee. Candlewick Press. ISBN 978-1-536-21554-0.
