= Becoming Billie Holiday =

2008 poetry book by Carole Boston Weatherford

- Author: Carole Boston Weatherford
- Illustrator: Floyd Cooper
- Genre: Children's poetry
- Publisher: Wordsong
- Publication date: 2008
- Publication place: United States
- Media type: Print (hardcover)
- Pages: 117
- Awards: Coretta Scott King Award
- ISBN: 978-1-59078-507-2
- OCLC: 51995

Becoming Billie Holiday is a 2008 book of poetry for young readers by American poet and author Carole Boston Weatherford and illustrated by Floyd Cooper, originally published by Wordsong. It won an honorary Coretta Scott King Award in 2009.

== Synopsis ==
Through a series of poems, Weatherford outlines the evolution from Eleanora Fagan to renowned singer Billie Holiday. Told from Billie's own perspective, she muses on the first 25 years of her life. Most poems are titled after actual Billie Holiday songs. The book starts with poems about her young life, detailing events such as her father's abandonment, her tomboyish attitude, and her time spent in an orphanage with nuns. It continues into her adolescence with poems about her first gig singing jazz, deciding to change her name, and her many relationships with men. Weatherford's book ends with Holiday's rising fame and the tension of racism in the United States. The last poem illustrates Holiday's memorable performance at the Café Society, singing the song "Strange Fruit". At the end of the book, there are pages giving information for further reading and biographies of others mentioned in the poems.

== Background ==
In the book's afterword, Weatherford talks about her childhood listening to jazz music with her father. As a teenager, she started listening to more popular music at the time until she watched the film Lady Sings the Blues in 1972. From then on, she was listening to and collecting Holiday's music all the time. Weatherford related to much of Holiday's life: a shared hometown of Baltimore, a difficult love life, and navigating the realities of racism. Before writing the poems, the author would listen to early Billie Holiday songs for weeks. For the factual parts of the story, Weatherford referenced oral histories and Holiday's autobiography. She hoped the book would inspire readers to learn more about the singer, as well as cross over to an adult audience. Weatherford has written several other books about jazz musicians.

Floyd Cooper created the illustrations in the book using an eraser to make subtractive shapes in paint. He also used other mediums on top that were oil based, all put on with a drybrush technique.

== Reception ==
Critics reviewed Becoming Billie Holiday very favorably. In a starred Kirkus review, they praise both Weatherford's "remarkable tribute" as well as illustrator Floyd Cooper's beautiful images. Another Kirkus reviewer was impressed with the rich writing of the poems, and felt it was a perfect tribute to such a celebrated singer. Booklist noted that Weatherford's book was "proud, and clear-toned". A starred review in the School Library Journal points out the perfect background soundtrack in the novel, praising Weatherford's choice to use song titles as poem titles. The reviewer comments on the author's way of capturing Holiday's "jazzy, candid voice so adroitly that at times the poems seem like they could have been lifted...from Holiday's autobiography..." She continues to marvel at Cooper's images that invoke real emotions paired with the words.

The book was awarded the honorary Coretta Scott King Award in 2009.
