= Mitsuo Hashimoto =

Mitsuo Hashimoto may refer to:

- Mitsuo Hashimoto (manga artist) (born 1955), Japanese manga artist
- Mitsuo Hashimoto (director), Japanese animation director
- Mitsuo Hashimoto, the real name of Kinpei Azusa (1931–1997), Japanese voice actor
