= Before John Was a Jazz Giant =

Book by Carole Boston Weatherford

Before John Was a Jazz Giant: A Song of John Coltrane
- Author: Carole Boston Weatherford
- Illustrator: Sean Qualls
- Language: English
- Genre: Children's literature
- Publisher: Henry Holt and Company
- Publication date: April 1, 2008
- Publication place: United States
- Media type: Picture book (hardcover)
- Pages: 32
- ISBN: 978-0-805-07994-4

Before John Was a Jazz Giant: A Song of John Coltrane is a children’s picture book written by American author and critic Carole Boston Weatherford and illustrated by Sean Qualls. It tells the story of a young John Coltrane growing up in the South in the 1930s. It was published by Henry Holt in 2008.

== Style ==
Before John Was a Jazz Giant consists of five poetic stanzas, each beginning with the phrase "Before John was a jazz giant". The stanzas provide "biographical details through metaphors evoking sound", such as "Before John was a jazz giant, / he heard Grandpa’s Sunday sermons, / Mama playing hymns for the senior choir, / and the scoutmaster’s call to join a band".

At the end of the book, Weatherford includes a full-page note that provides additional biographical details.

== Reception ==
=== Reviews ===
Booklist's Hazel Rochman highlighted "the beat of lyrical words and the rhythm of the beautiful illustrations", while Kirkus Reviews discussed how "Qualls’s mixed-media full-bleed spreads employ a color palette (blue, sienna, ochre, white) and sonic iconography [...]. Circles and bubbles populate each spread, standing in for the emanations of Grandma’s cooking pots, the setting-sun sadness of a family funeral and sweet possibility, as John 'picked up that horn.'" On behalf of School Library Journal, Joyce Adams Burner described the writing as "evocative" in how it "traces Coltrane's influences simply and stunningly, her redolent voice as smooth and vivid as jazz itself".

=== Awards and honors ===
Before John Was a Jazz Giant is a Junior Library Guild book.

The Chicago Public Library named Before John Was a Jazz Giant one of the best Informational Books for Younger Readers of 2009, and Bank Street College of Education included it on their list of the best children's books of the year.

The Association for Library Service to Children named Before John Was a Jazz Giant a 2009 Notable Children's Book, and the National Council for the Social Studies included it on their 2009 list of Notable Social Studies Trade Books for Young People.

Awards for Before John Was a Jazz Giant
Year	Award	Result	Ref.
2009	Coretta Scott King Award for Illustrator	Honor	
2009	Golden Kite Award for Picture Book Text	Honor	
2009	Michigan Great Lakes Great Books Award		
2012	GA Picture Storybook Award		
