= Freedom in Congo Square =

2016 picture book

- Author: Carole Boston Weatherford
- Illustrator: R. Gregory Christie
- Publisher: Little Bee Books
- Publication date: January 5, 2016
- Pages: unpaged
- Awards: Caldecott Honor; Coretta Scott King Award
- ISBN: 978-1-49980-103-3

Freedom in Congo Square is a 2016 poetic nonfiction picture book by Carole Boston Weatherford, and illustrated by R. Gregory Christie. It was published in hardcover by Little Bee Books. The book provides an account of 19th-century slaves in New Orleans who were able to gather in one place on Sundays: Congo Square. In addition to the book's main text, "an introduction and afterword provide further historic detail."

In 2017, the book received a Caldecott Honor and Coretta Scott King Award honor for its illustrations.

== Style ==
Freedom in Congo Square is written in rhyming couplets.

== Reception ==
=== Reviews ===
Freedom in Congo Square was well received by critics, including starred reviews from Booklist and Kirkus Reviews.

On behalf of Booklist, Amina Chaudhri described the book as "subtle and layered", while Shelf Awareness's Karin Snelson referred to it as "graceful [and] gorgeous".

Kirkus Reviews referred to the lyrical writing as "powerful and evocative, providing a strong and emotional window into the world of the slave". Chaudhri discussed how "through sparse, deliberate language, Weatherford tangibly captures the anticipation of those Sundays" in Congo Park. According to Publishers Weekly, Weatherford "succeeds in evoking a world where prospect of Sunday becomes a way to withstand relentless toil and oppression" but "hits a few flat notes with her rhyming". Chaudhri further wrote, "The blunt words are richly supplemented by illustrations reminiscent of Jacob Lawrence’s work. Christie elegantly renders people's gestures in chalk, capturing their energy or lack of, depending on the context".

Chaudri concluded, "This is an important story, beautifully told." Similarly, Snelson finished their review by writing, "This is a powerful testimony to the resilience of the human spirit and a fine conversation starter".

=== Awards and honors ===
Freedom in Congo Square is a Junior Library Guild book.

The Horn Book Magazine, Kirkus Reviews, the New York Public Library, The New York Times Book Review, and The Washington Post named Freedom in Congo Square one of the best picture books of 2016. Booklist also included Freedom in Congo Square on its "Booklist Editors' Choice: Books for Youth" and "Top 10 Multicultural Nonfiction for Youth" lists. The following year, Bank Street College of Education named it as a book of "outstanding merit" for children ages five to nine. International Literacy Association (CL/R SIG) included it among their "Notable Books for a Global Society", Capitol Choices named it among their "Noteworthy Books for Children" ages seven to ten, and the Association for Library Service to Children named it among their "Notable Children's Books".

In 2016, Freedom in Congo Square was an honor book for the Coretta Scott King Award for Illustrator. The following year, it won the Charlotte Zolotow Award and was an honor book for the Caldecott Medal.

== Adaptations ==
In July 2017, a 12-minute film by Dreamscape was released. In addition to the text of the book, the film includes what Booklist reviewer Brian Wilson described as a "lengthy but informative foreword, penned by historian and Congo Square expert Freddi Williams Evans". During the film, sound effects, such as mooing cows, play while narrator JD Jackson reads through the text describing the slaves' work week. The background music changes as Sunday arrives, switching to African-inspired drum music. At the end of the film, Jackson reads the note from the end of the book.

Booklist and School Library Journal provided the film starred reviews. Wilson described the film as a "moving presentation of Carole Boston Weatherford's powerful nonfiction picture book", while School Library Journal's Lonna Pierce referred to is as "transcendent and inspiring". Wilson praised "JD Jackson's heartfelt narration", which Pierce described as "rich", noting that it "weaves history, culture, music, and dance together into a vibrant cloth". Wilson also discussed the "effective sound effects", which he found "add to the somber mood as the animated figures, with their bodies sometimes bent at painful angles, are seen working throughout the week". Pierce highlighted "Christie's childlike, abstract cut-paper bodies", which "seem to leap off the screen, arms waving and tambourines shaking to the rhythmic drums, and the hypnotic music varies with each scene".

Booklist also included the Freedom in Congo Square film on their 2017 "Booklist Editors' Choice: Video" list.
