= Toku Nishio =

Japanese actor and voice actor (1939–2005)

- Born: Yasunori Nishio; September 12, 1939; Gifu Prefecture, Empire of Japan
- Died: July 19, 2005 (aged 65); Tokyo, Japan
- Occupation: Voice actor
- Years active: 1959-2005
- Agent: Tokyo Actor's Consumer's Cooperative Society

Toku Nishio (西尾 徳, Nishio Toku; September 12, 1939 – July 19, 2005) was a Japanese actor and voice actor from Gifu Prefecture, Japan. He was represented by Tokyo Actor's Consumer's Cooperative Society.

He was most known for the roles of Kanichi Nishi (Ashita no Joe), Musashi Tomoe (Getter Robo), and Mr. Popo (Dragon Ball).

== Filmography ==
=== Television animation ===
1970

- Ashita no Joe (1970) - Kanichi "Mammoth" Nishi
- Vicky the Viking (1974) - Faxe (voice)
- Getter Robo (1974) - Musashi Tomoe

1980

- Kaitei Daisensō: Ai no 20,000 Miles (1981) - Jim (voice)
- Stop!! Hibari-kun! (1983) - Seiji (voice)
- Dragon Ball (1988) - Mr. Popo (voice)
- Dragon Ball Z (1989) - Mr. Popo / South Kaiō (voice)

1990

- The Irresponsible Captain Tylor (1993) - Yutta Do Lonawer (voice)
- Dragon Ball GT (1996) - Mr. Popo (voice)
- Yawara! Special: Zutto Kimi no Koto ga... . (1996) - Saitō
- Berserk (1998) - Conrad (voice)

Unknown date

- Akuma-kun - Zoujin
- Belle and Sebastian - Prim Berg
- City Hunter - Matsui / Ogura
- Lupin the Third Part II - Minister Mokeru
- Nintama Rantarō - Tomomi's Papa (mistakenly credited as Daisuke Gōri)
- Oishinbo - Otani
- Samurai Giants - Bansaku Ozutsu
- The Wonderful Adventures of Nils - Sun
- Uchū Majin Daikengō - Anike
- Yawara! - Saitō

=== Original video animation (OVA) ===
- Robot Carnival (1987) - Daimaru (voice)
- Dragon Ball Z Side Story: Plan to Eradicate the Saiyans (1993) - Mr. Popo (voice)

Unknown date

- Crying Freeman - Shou-Aidou

=== Theatrical animation ===
- Ôkami no monshô (1973) - Umakawa
- Great Mazinger vs. Getter Robo (1975) - Musashi Tomoe
- Neo Heroic Fantasia Arion (1986) - Gid
- Dirty Pair: Project Eden (1986) - Bruno (voice)
- Akuma-kun (1989) - Zoujin
- Akuma-kun: Yōkoso Akuma Land e!! (1990) - Zoujin
- Dragon Ball Z: The Return of Cooler (1992) - Mr. Popo (voice)
- Dragon Ball Z: Fusion Reborn (1995) - South Kaiō (Japanese version, voice)

=== Video games ===
- Super Robot Wars series (1996-2005) - Musashi Tomoe, Leslie Rashid

=== Dubbing ===
- The Adventures of Buckaroo Banzai Across the 8th Dimension, John Bigbooté (Christopher Lloyd)
- Das Boot, Obersteuermann Kriechbaum (Bernd Tauber)

=== Tokusatsu ===
- Kikaider 01 (1973) - Pollution Catfish (ep. 30)
- Himitsu Sentai Goranger (1975-1976) - Gold Mask (ep. 1), Boat Ear Mask (ep. 11), Black Hair Mask (ep. 16 - 17), Wire Mask (ep. 22), Pirates Mask (ep. 38)
- Roboto Hatyan (1981-1982) - Robot Yakisora
- Taiyou Sentai Sun Vulcan (1981-1982) - Crab Monger (ep. 33), Mechanic Monger (ep. 43), Boxer Monger (ep. 45), Fighter Monger (ep. 48)
- Dai Sentai Goggle-V (1982-1983) - Bird Mozoo (ep. 2), Mantis Mozoo (ep. 5), Cat Mozoo (ep. 7), Moth Mozoo (ep. 8), Angler Mozoo (ep. 14), Coelacanth Mozoo (ep. 21), Peacock Mozoo (ep. 22), Chameleon Mozoo (ep. 24), Watermelon Mozoo (ep. 27), Tengu Mozoo (ep. 30), Rattlesnake Mozoo (ep. 31), Tiger Mozoo (ep. 33), Crocodile Mozoo (ep. 34), Rhinoceros Mozoo (ep. 38), Reporter (actor) (ep. 41), Silkworm Mozoo (ep. 41), Tanuki Mozoo (ep. 45), Giant Tortoise Mozoo (ep. 47), Bear Mozoo (ep. 49)
- Space Sheriff Gavan (1982-1983) - Ookamado Monster, Samurai Ant Monster, Armadillo Monster, Double Man Zombie C, Saber Doubler, Gas Doubler, Saimin Doubler, Guts Doubler, Hell Doubler
- Kagaku Sentai Dynaman (1983-1984) - Crab Evo (ep. 1), Bat Evo (ep. 3), Sponge Evo (ep. 7), Butterfly Evo (ep. 8), Octopus Shinka (ep. 10), Gecko Evo (ep. 15), Dinosaur Evo (ep. 17), Crocodile Evo (ep. 21), Cram School Owner (actor) (ep. 22), Striped Mosquito Evo (ep. 28), Electric Eel (ep. 37), Armor Rose (ep. 38), Drill Horse (ep. 41)/Drill Pegasus (ep. 41), Rocket Tiger (ep. 43), Jet Flying Squirrel (ep. 46)
- Space Sheriff Sharivan (1983-1984) - Boxer Beast, Illusion Beast, Virus Beast, Campus Beast, Kodai Beast, Great Gamagon, Hyadune Beast, Bunri Beast (voice of Eisuke Yoda), Ashura Beast (voice)
- Space Sheriff Shaider (1984-1985) - Petpet, Gokugoku, Kerokero, Guriguri, Girigiri, Magmag, Shigishigi, Lovelove, Kamikami, Fumafuma, Marimari, Comcom, Moviemovie, Pairpair, Tsutatsuta
- Seiun Kamen Machineman (1984) - Tetsujin Monsu
- Kyojuu Tokusou Jaspion (1985) - Mega Beast Marigos (ep. 1), Gaude (ep. 1)
- Dengeki Sentai Changeman (1986-1987) - Gome (ep. 2), Rogan (ep. 15), Kigan (ep. 24), Dolon (ep. 38)
- Jikuu Senshi Spielban (1986) - Puncher
- Choujinki Metalder (1987) - Gaisei Coolgin, Gamadon
- Choujuu Sentai Liveman (1987-1988) - Poison gas Zuno (ep. 13), Pig Zuno (ep. 24)
- Kamen Rider Black (1987-1888) - Rhinoceros Mutant, Mammoth Mutant, Ammonite Mutant, Mushroom Mutant, Fly Mutant
- Kamen Rider Black RX (1988-1989) - Strange Demon Robot Gungadin, Strange Alien Lifeforms Dogmalogma, Strange Demon Robot Nexticker, Strange Alien Lifeforms Matbot, Strange Alien Lifeforms Balunbolun
- Kousoku Sentai Turboranger (1989-1990) - Dango Bōma, Oni Boma, Ironing Boma, Shinigami Boma
- Kidou Keiji Jiban (1989) - Molenoid, Skunknoid, Dragonnoid, Electric Fishnoid, Cobranoid
- Chikyu Sentai Fiveman (1990-1991) - Todorugin, Galaxy Monster Kaijurugin, Sazaemajirogin,
- Choujin Sentai Jetman (1991-1992) - Voice Jigen, Ant Bazooka, Laser Lizard
- Kyōryū Sentai Zyuranger (1992-1993) - Dora Circe, Dora Boogaranan, Dora Gunrock
- Gosei Sentai Dairanger (1993) - Master Mirror
- Ninja Sentai Kakuranger (1994) - TV announcer (actor)
- Blue Swat (1994) - Riga
- Chouriki Sentai Ohranger (1995) - Bara Vacuum
- Juukou B-Fighter (1995) - Bububu
