= MacNolia Cox =

U.S. National Spelling Bee finalist in 1936

MacNolia Cox (January 12, 1923 - September 12, 1976) was an American woman who, aged 13 in 1936, was one of the first African-American finalists, and the first African-American top five finisher, in the Scripps National Spelling Bee. Her achievement was later celebrated in a verse novel, M-A-C-N-O-L-I-A (2005), in a nonfiction children's picture book, How Do You Spell Unfair? (2023), and by a United States Senate resolution "Honoring the life, legacy, and achievements of MacNolia Cox" passed on September 15, 2021.

== Early life ==
MacNolia Cox was born in Akron, Ohio, on January 12, 1923. Her parents were John Thomas Cox and Alberta Key. John Cox was both a carpenter and a Works Progress Administration worker, and Alberta Key was a homemaker. MacNolia Cox had one brother and three sisters. The family was poor.

Cox and her family were members of the Livingston Baptist Church. Cox lived in Akron, a town that was primarily focused in tire and rubber production with a lot of factories spread throughout the town employing thousands. Before Cox was born, the town was mostly run by members of the Ku Klux Klan with key figures such as the mayor, sheriff, county officials, and most of the school board all being members. This made Akron a heavily segregated town by the time Cox was born, making her life as a black girl harder.

Cox loved to read at an early age, and spent hours reading and memorizing the words in the dictionary, giving her an extraordinary vocabulary for a girl of her age. After enrolling in school, she began to dream of becoming a doctor.

=== Schooling ===
Cox attended Colonial Academy in the Kenmore district of Akron, Ohio. The principal of the school was Blanche V. Boyd. Cox had one teacher who supported her more than any other, her homeroom teacher, Cornelia Greve. Greve kindled Cox's love for learning and, more importantly, her love for words.

By 8th grade Cox's talent around words and definitions was very polished and her homeroom teacher Greve picked up on her abilities. Greve soon told Boyd of Cox’s special talent and the two created a plan to make Cox a spelling connoisseur. They let her study the dictionary for two periods every day allowing her to memorize over 100,000 words on the spelling bee list, making her an extremely well-prepared speller.

== 1936 Spelling Bee ==
=== Akron Spelling Bee ===
Cox’s journey to national recognition began at the Akron Spelling Bee. In April 1936, as an eighth grader from the Kenmore Colonial School, Cox competed against 50 of the best spellers in Akron in front of an audience of over 3,000 people in the event sponsored by the city newspaper, The Akron Beacon Journal. Cox impressed the audience with her abilities by spelling words such as pretentious, brusque, abstemious and apoplexy. Eventually, only one other student stood between Cox and the title, John Huddleston, 14, from St. Vincent school. The two battled back and forth until Huddleston misspelled the word sciatic and Cox got it right. After correctly spelling her final word, voluble, Cox became the first African-American to win the Akron Spelling Bee. The teen won a trip to Washington D.C. to represent Akron at the National Spelling Bee along with $25 for her accomplishment.

Her success was greatly celebrated within her community. The day following her victory her school was said to have been ‘bursting with pride’ as a demonstration was held in the lawn of the school accompanied by rousing cheers from her peers. She was later called on in an assembly to “tell how it felt to be a champion”, to which she simply replied “I’m glad I won, and I hope I win in Washington”. A check for $50 was also awarded to Cox by the Black Elks, a historically black non-profit organization. This was presented to her by James S. Russel in a public meeting at the Second Baptist church where she was the guest of honor. Former Judge W. C. Hudston had also come from Washington D.C to Akron to attend the meeting and congratulate Cox “We’re proud of you young lady” he said “And we’re pulling for you to win down in my city (Washington D.C)”.

When Cox went to board the train to the capital, thousands of well wishers gathered at the union depot, cheering and clapping while a military band played tunes in the girl's honor. She was accompanied by her mother, Alberta Keys, teacher Cornelia Greve, and Beacon Journal reporter Mabel Norris Reese, “This is the most fun I’ve ever had in my life,” Cox stated as she boarded the train.

Despite her local success, Cox’s journey to Washington D.C. for the national competition was filled with racial obstacles that highlighted the racial segregation of the era. Cox had been warned by John S. Knight, the Beacon Journal publisher, that Washington was a segregated city and that “You will have to face all kinds of difficulties”. The first challenge arose when Cox and her mother, previously sitting in the general coach, were moved to the “colored” car upon crossing the Maryland border, due to the persisting laws of segregation in the south. While other district spelling champions stayed at the prestigious Willard Hotel, Cox and her mother were denied lodging due to their race and had to stay with a black surgeon, Dr. T. Edward Jones, due to Washington’s segregative legislation. They were also prohibited from using the elevator when arriving at the spelling bee banquet, being forced to scale a back stairwell instead. Cox as well as Elizabeth Kenney, from Plainfield, New Jersey, were the first African American students to compete in the National Spelling Bee, 11 years after it was founded in 1925. The two black girls were seated at a card table apart from their white competitors, while their families were also seated separate from the other spectators; they were all also required to enter the ballroom through a backdoor.

=== National Spelling Bee ===
The 12th annual National Spelling Bee was held on May 26, 1936, at the National Museum in Washington D.C., and hosted the nation's 17 best spellers. Cox performed well, spelling words such as analogous, baccalaureate, discrepancies, pharmaceutical and sepulchral without hesitation. She advanced to the final five competitors.

Cox was then asked to spell ‘nemesis’, by the all-white southern judges, a word not featured on the official list. Her error, resulting in her ultimate elimination from the competition, was placing an ‘a’ after the 'm' instead of an ‘e’. Cox’s disqualification precipitated a long and heated discussion between her teacher and the chairman of the contest, Dean George B. Woods. Cornelia Greve highlighted that proper nouns were ruled out of the competition by regulations and that ‘nemesis’ was given in the dictionary as a proper noun as the Greek goddess of retribution or revenge. Woods said the word was used just as frequently as a common noun, and said he had defined it to Cox as meaning ‘fate’ upon her request. The chairman proceeded to ask the judges to rule on the case, and they sided with Woods.

After the argument concluded, one of the judges, Rev. James S. Montgomery, approached the Baltimore Afro-American reporter and claimed when he was ruling on the case, he did not know that the contestant in question was colored “I would not want to appear to discriminate for anything in the world,” he said. The Akron newspaper’s correspondent, however, was adamant in her stance and said “I still think it was an unfair ruling that puts a blot on the whole contest.”

Despite her elimination, Cox was still one of the first two black finalists of the National Spelling Bee, and in coming 5th place received a $75 reward.

After the competition, Cox and the other contestants participated in a variety of scheduled events including a dinner at the Hamilton Hotel, a visit to the White House and the Washington Monument as well as an expedition to the Bureau of Engraving.

== Aftermath and later life ==
Upon returning to her hometown of Akron, Ohio, a parade was held in Cox's honor. Hundreds of automobiles participated in a procession from Union Depot to Colonial School, where officials delivered speeches and congratulated Cox. Arlene Bauford, president of the Akron Chapter of the National Council of Negro Women, remarked, “This is just the beginning for her. She has shown what she can achieve, and what we, as a race, can achieve".

Later in the week an assembly was held at the Colonial School to honor Cox and her achievements, where speeches were held and Cox was awarded one of the honor medals given by the American Legion to students excelling in their studies. Principal Boyd highlighted that Cox was an ‘A’ student in all her subjects and praised the girl on her showing in the contest and poignant acceptance of her defeat. Mayor William Sawyer also attended the event and dedicated a verse to the young girl. The mayor donned a high silk hat and a Prince Albert suit, only seen before on two previous occasions. The first was in 1901 when he and a delegation of important Akronites went to Canton for the funeral of President William McKinley. The next time was the dedication of McKinley's monument at Canton. And now the third, in honour of Cox. “It is an occasion,” he said, “I’m going to wear my silk hat and frock coat”. Sawyer recited an 11-verse poem praising Cox.

MacNolia Cox eventually married John Montiere. While Cox was known for her academic excellence, Montiere was described as streetwise. The couple lived in Akron.

Despite her academic talent, national recognition, and desire to become a doctor, Cox never attended college. She worked as a domestic employee for a provincial Akron doctor. During this time many African-American women were forced to take low-paying jobs due to the severe racial discrimination that restricted them from advancing in white-collar professions. This occurred before the Brown v. Board of Education decision and the Pell Grant.

Later in life, Cox suffered from severe health issues. She died from cancer on September 12, 1976 at Summa St. Thomas Hospital in Akron, at 53 years old. Being a finalist in the spelling bee was noted in her obituary.

== Legacy and recognition ==
=== In literature ===
Written by Carole Boston Weatherford and illustrated by Frank Morrison, the nonfiction children's picture book, How Do You Spell Unfair? (2023), tells the story of MacNolia Cox, and her experience while competing at the Scripps National Spelling Bee. The book begins with a foreword, followed by a page introducing Cox, and her love for reading, studying, and spelling. The book then goes on to tell her story, from winning the school spelling bee, to being greeted by a big homecoming parade when arriving home after the National Spelling Bee. The book concludes with an epilogue, which details events after the bee, including both Cox and other spelling bee contestants. The book won the Correta Scott King award, and received positive reviews by major book reviewers including Common Sense Media.

A verse novel, M-A-C-N-O-L-I-A, was published by A. Van Jordan on December 17, 2005. The novel focuses on the impact the spelling bee had on Cox’s life, while simultaneously exploring social and racial attitudes of the Depression thirties, using Cox’s experience as a base to bring awareness to the subject. It communicates this through a variety of non linear poetry, and is often described as a “poignant narrative” by readers. Jordan, born in 1965 in Akron, Ohio, is a poet, and the author of four collections, including M-A-C-N-O-L-I-A.

=== Senate resolution ===
A Senate resolution "Honoring the life, legacy, and achievements of MacNolia Cox" was sponsored by former United States senators representing Ohio, Sherrod Brown (Democrat, 2007-2025) and Rob Portman (Republican, 2011-2023), and passed on September 15, 2021, this resolution “honors the life, legacy, and achievements of MacNolia Cox [as] an inspiration for young students of Color today.”. The resolution summarizes her life leading up to the National Spelling Bee, then addresses the differential treatment and racism she experienced while participating at the National Spelling Bee as a young Black girl, by acknowledging that “during the competition, MacNolia was asked to spell the word ‘‘nemesis’’, which at the time was capitalized and therefore barred from the competition; Whereas the use of this word in the competition was immediately protested by a Beacon Journal reporter, and despite learning 100,000 approved words, MacNolia misspelled the word and finished the competition fifth overall, taking home a $75 prize”. The resolution was considered and agreed to unanimously without amendment by the Senate.
