= In Your Hands (book) =

2017 children's book

- Author: Carole Boston Weatherford
- Illustrator: Brian Pinkney
- Publisher: Atheneum Press
- Publication date: September 12, 2017
- ISBN: 978-1-4814-6293-8

In Your Hands is a 2017 children's picture book written by Carole Boston Weatherford and illustrated by Brian Pinkney.

The book is written from the perspective of a Black mother as she holds her newborn son, Omari. She imagines their life together, including rocking him to sleep and holding his hand on the way to kindergarten. However, she knows she will not always be able to protect him, especially as he encounters racism, so she prays that God will also be there for him.

== Reception ==
In Your Hands was well-received by critics, including starred reviews from Booklist, Kirkus Reviews, Publishers Weekly, and School Library Journal.

Kirkus Reviews described the book as "Insightful, poignant, groundbreaking," as well as "a reminder that the lives of all children are also in our hands". Booklist's Carolyn Phelan praised the book's "powerfully written text", which Kirkus Reviews referred to as "moving" and "poetic". To this, Publishers Weekly added, "For all its beauty and lyricism, Weatherford’s book doesn’t equivocate. Because for children like Omari, the stakes are as high as their mothers’ love is deep". Danielle Jones, writing on behalf of School Library Journal, further discussed how "the text is given the space to shine opposite Pinkney's art, with font size changes for impact". Phelan also praised Pinkney's "luminous artwork", which Kirkus Reviews referred to as "striking".

In Your Hands is a Junior Library Guild book. Kirkus Reviews named it one of the best picture books of 2017. Booklist included it on their 2017 "Top 10 Religion & Spirituality Books for Youth" list and 2018 "Top 10 Diverse Picture Books".
