= Mr. Popo =

Fictional character from Dragon Ball

- Dragon Ball character
- Mr. Popo, as drawn by Akira Toriyama
- First appearance: Dragon Ball chapter #163: "The Sanctuary of Kami-sama" (Weekly Shōnen Jump 1988)
- Created by: Akira Toriyama
- Voiced by: Japanese: Toku Nishio (1988-2002); Dai Matsumoto (2004-2005); Yasuhiko Kawazu (2009-present); Kimiko Saitō (Mini; Dragon Ball Daima; English: Christopher Sabat (Funimation dub); Chris Cason (Dragon Ball Z Kai, Dragon Ball Super; Funimation dub)

Mr. Popo (Japanese: ミスター・ポポ, Hepburn: Misutā Popo) is a fictional character from the Dragon Ball series created by Akira Toriyama, a genie who serves as the assistant to Earth's god and the caretaker of their residence, which is located high above the sky. He first appears in the one hundred sixty-third chapter of the Dragon Ball manga, published in 1988. In the Japanese anime adaptations, his voice actor was Toku Nishio, before Yasuhiko Kawazu took over the role for Dragon Ball Kai. For English language media, he was voiced by Christopher Cason in 1999 and from 2010 on. The character was also voiced by Chris Sabat from 2000 up until 2005.

Mr. Popo's design and humanoid appearance has been criticized as an offensive racist stereotype by some commentators, such as children's book author and activist Carole Boston Weatherford. As a result of the controversy, Mr. Popo's appearance had been modified in some media depictions of the character: his lips are downsized digitally in the American release of the Dragon Ball manga by Viz Media, and his skin is recoloured blue from his original black colour in the CW4Kids TV broadcast of Dragon Ball Kai.

== Development ==
Mr. Popo was initially envisioned by series creator Akira Toriyama as a reptilian humanoid with a chicken-like beak that had several variant designs, including one sketch with curly hair, though all of which were ultimately discarded. Later concept art by Toriyama depict him as a slender man dressed in a manner reminiscent of Namu, an Indian yogi-inspired character who fights series protagonist Goku in a martial arts tournament early in the series. Toriyama ultimately settled on the current design, a portly humanoid with bright facial expressions whose clothing resembles Jinns, supernatural beings from Arabian mythology and Islamic theology. The early concept art sketches of Mr. Popo are included in the 30th Anniversary Dragon Ball Super History Book published in 2016.

According to Toriyama, Mr. Popo has served as an assistant to successive generations of gods who preside over Earth in the Dragon Ball universe, suggesting that he existed long before the "Nameless Namekian" arrived on Earth and subsequently serve as the world's guardian deity. Besides being a skilled practitioner of martial arts, Toriyama noted that Mr. Popo is also responsible for crafting the physical appearance of the wish-granting dragon Shenron, originally created by the Namekian Kami" and summoned from Earth's seven Dragon Balls, as it is derived from a figurine modeled by Mr. Popo.

The North American English releases of the manga series by Viz Media reduced the size of Mr. Popo's lips by shading them in completely. In 2009, the CW4Kids airing of Dragon Ball Z Kai recoloured Mr. Popo's black skin to be blue and his lips orange-yellow in hue.

=== Voice acting ===
Mr. Popo is voiced by Toku Nishio in the original series, Yasuhiko Kawazu in Kai, and Kimiko Saitō in Dragon Ball Daima. Prior to Kawazu, Dai Matsumoto voiced him in Budokai 3 and Budokai Tenkaichi. In English, he was voiced by Alvin Sanders in the Ocean dub, and by Chris Cason and Christopher Sabat in the Funimation dubs. Cason's lines as Popo in the original airings of Dragon Ball Z were dubbed over by Sabat by the time the remastered DVDs were released, only for Cason to take over again as Mr. Popo in Kai. Other English voice actors include Doug Rand, who voiced Mr. Popo in the AB Groupe dub of the sixth DBZ film; Apollo Abraham, who was heard in the obscure Philippine dub of said film by Creative Products Corp.; and David Alan Pettitt, who lent his voice in the Blue Water dubs of Dragon Ball and Dragon Ball GT. Sabat in particular is fond of the character, and was hopeful that the character would eventually be added into the roster of the popular fighting game Dragon Ball FighterZ as part of future downloadable content.

== Appearances ==
A supporting character who has few overall appearances within the series, Mr. Popo's duties consist of looking after Kami, tending to his residence, and reconstructing Shenron if the dragon's physical form is destroyed. He also tends to an ancient butterfly garden that he cultivated thousands of years prior to the events of the series. In Dragon Ball, Popo is far stronger than Son Goku when he first arrives at Kami's Palace. He trains Goku for three years until the boy learns everything he knows. Some of the techniques Goku developed under the tutelage of Mr. Popo include the Chou Kamehameha, a more lethal version of his signature attack. In Dragon Ball Z, he helps Bulma, Krillin, and Gohan by divulging the location of Kami's old starship to facilitate their journey to Planet Namek. He then serves Dende as his attendant upon the latter's ascension as Earth's new guardian deity later in the narrative.

Mr. Popo has demonstrated the ability to magically create objects from seemingly out of thin air, for example a flying carpet which he uses as transportation in the anime story arc Garlic Junior Saga, though the character is also depicted as capable of flight or levitation using ki. Unlike series protagonist Goku, Mr. Popo can teleport instantly to a desired location without requiring the use of an energy signature to home in on. In the Dragon Ball Z anime, Mr. Popo has a brief match with Son Goten and Trunks who have transformed into Super Saiyan form where he holds his own, blocking or dodging several hits and even appearing unfazed after being struck by a kick.

== Controversy and reception ==
The Dragon Ball media franchise, particularly the anime adaptation of Dragon Ball Z, has long been popular with black communities around the world, as well as hip hop culture and art movement. For many African Americans who grew up watching Dragon Ball anime, the design of Mr. Popo is regarded by African Americans as an example of highly offensive black stereotypes.

Mr. Popo's appearance, abilities, and name share many similarities with the Buddhist/Hindu Dharmapala deity, Mahakala. These similarities include:

- Black skin with bright red lips
- Jovial, rotund appearance specific to Japan
- Dominion over time
- The Tibetan name: ནག་པོ་ཆེན་པོ།, THL: nak po chen po, (emphasis added) meaning "Great Black One"
- Acting as a keeper of wisdom

Notably, however, Toriyama grew up at the height of the Dakkochan craze, and, at the time of the character's debut in 1988, Japanese popular culture was still inundated with portrayals of blackface, a controversial form of makeup historically associated with stage and film caricatures of African Americans, or a representation of the antiquated racial term sambo.

While Western commentators have often omitted the Buddhist/Hindu influence on the character, by the early 2000s, some began referring to Mr. Popo as a derogatory stereotype in the style of blackface. In her article written for The Christian Science Monitor in May 2000, Weatherford alleged that Mr. Popo represents a depiction of individuals with African heritage from a white supremacist perspective, and that characters like him are known to a far-reaching audience of children through cartoons and product tie-ins. She suggested that such stereotypical characters could adversely affect the malleable self-image of black children, and noted to her bemusement that "racist stereotypes that would shock Americans don't raise an eyebrow in much of Asia". In 2001, the Jim Crow Museum of Racist Memorabilia at Ferris State University declared that Mr. Popo is an example of a racist caricature in modern fiction. The Jim Crow Museum later published on their official website a letter written in response to their article from a reader who disagreed with their assertion that characters like Mr. Popo are deliberately anti-black in design.

In a retrospective discussion about the character, Ramsey Isler from IGN suggested that it is easy to label Mr. Popo as a racist caricature if the character is described simply as "the black-skinned, red-lipped, turban-wearing servant of Kami". On one hand, he questioned the likelihood of whether Toriyama intentionally made a racist joke through Mr. Popo, acknowledging an argument from some quarters that Mr. Popo's appearance may have been "a little artistic license for an imaginary character", on the basis that "Japanese animation has a history of exaggerating non-Japanese characters because the Japanese population is not very diverse" and that Japanese society "does not have the kinds of racial sensitivities that the Western world has". On the other hand, he also raised questions as to whether a controversial topic which is not intended to be offensive make it any less so, as well as whether explanations like "it's only a joke" or "they don't know any better" absolve wrongful conduct. Jack Gardner from Screen Rant assessed Mr. Popo as a relic of blackface portrayal which persisted in the manga and animation industries of Japan and the wider Asian world, long after it became a taboo subject in North America following the aftermath of the civil rights movement. While Gardner acknowledged the subsequent and substantial changes to the highly divisive character, he found it shocking that Mr. Popo would even appear unaltered in an internationally popular syndicated television show in the 1990s.

Regarding the alteration of Mr. Popo's skin colour in some media depictions, Jemima Sebastian from IGN noted that the change was made for reasons that could never be fully explained, but that many fans would connect it to perceptions of racism. Cecilia D'Anastasio from Kotaku observed that while there is awareness that the character was not intended to be African-American or inspired by any people with African descents or origins, Mr. Popo's appearance still evokes the image of a "dark-skinned slave with puffy red lips" and the decision to recolour him for American television is indicative of his potentially offensive reception.

== See also ==
- Jynx, a fictional species of Pokémon also accused of being a racist caricature.
