= Unspeakable: The Tulsa Race Massacre =

2021 children's picture book by Carole Boston Weatherford

- Author: Carole Boston Weatherford
- Illustrator: Floyd Cooper
- Language: English
- Genre: Picture book
- Publisher: Carolrhoda Books, an imprint of Lerner Publications
- Publication date: February 2, 2021
- Publication place: United States
- Pages: 32
- Awards: Coretta Scott King Award; Caldecott Honor
- ISBN: 978-1-5415-8120-3

Unspeakable: The Tulsa Race Massacre is a picture book written by Carole Boston Weatherford and illustrated by Floyd Cooper. Published on February 2, 2021, by Carolrhoda, it tells the history behind the Tulsa race massacre in verse.

The book was praised by critics, receiving several starred reviews, and was the recipient of a Caldecott Honor and the Coretta Scott King Award in both the author and illustrator categories.

== Reception ==
=== Reviews ===
Eboni Njoku, writing for The Horn Book Magazine, commented on how Weatherford took "[g]reat care" to describe the community that lived in what was known as the "Black Wall Street" and praised the "[s]mall details" present in the writing, which "add to the authenticity of the narrative". Njoku also praised Cooper's illustrations, due to "the sepia-toned images resembling historical photographs." A review published in The School Library Journal further adds that the "illustrations are infused with a personal connection", as Cooper's grandfather would tell him stories about the Tulsa race massacre.

Publishers Weekly highlighted the fact the book focuses not only on "the attack, but also on the positive achievements of the Black business owners, lawyers, and doctors". Kirkus Reviews called Unspeakable a "somber, well-executed addition to the history as the incident approaches its 100th anniversary."

=== Awards and honors ===
Unspeakable is a Junior Library Guild book.

In 2021, Kirkus Reviews, The New York Times Book Review, the New York Public Library, and NPR named Unspeakable one of the best picture books of the year. The Horn Book Magazine named it among the year's best nonfiction books, and the Chicago Public Library named it among the year's "Best Informational Books for Older Readers".

The same year, Booklist included Unspeakable on their "Booklist Editors' Choice: Books for Youth" list. The following year, they included it on their "Top 10 History for Youth" list. It was also considered a notable children's book by the Association for Library Service to Children, Capitol Choices, and the International Literacy Association (CL/R SIG).

Awards for Unspeakable
Year	Award	Result	Ref.
2021	Boston Globe–Horn Book Award for Nonfiction	Honor	
2021	Kirkus Prize for Picture Books	Finalist	
2021	National Book Award for Young People's Literature	Longlisted	
2022	Caldecott Medal for Author	Honor	
2022	Carter G. Woodson Book Award (Middle Level)	Won	
2022	Coretta Scott King Award for Author and Illustrator	Won	
2022	Kids' Book Choice Award for Book of the Year: 3rd to 5th Grade	Won	
2022	Sibert Medal	Won	

=== Controversy ===
Oklahoma passed House Bill 1775 (2021), which restricts teaching concepts that could cause students to feel "discomfort, guilt, anguish or any other form of psychological distress on account of his or her race or sex". Unspeakable has been restricted because of this bill in the very state where this riot took place.
