= Dragon Ball Z: The Return of Cooler =

- Theatrical release poster
- Directed by: Daisuke Nishio
- Written by: Takao Koyama
- Based on: Dragon Ball by Akira Toriyama
- Produced by: Chiaki Imada; Rikizō Kayano
- Starring: See below
- Cinematography: Yukio Katayama
- Edited by: Shin'ichi Fukumitsu
- Music by: Shunsuke Kikuchi
- Production company: Toei Doga Co., Ltd.
- Distributed by: Toei Company
- Release date: March 7, 1992 (Japan)
- Running time: 46 minutes
- Country: Japan
- Language: Japanese
- Box office: ¥2.72 billion (Japan)

Dragon Ball Z: The Return of Cooler, known in Japan as Dragon Ball Z: Gekitotsu!! Hyaku-Oku Power no Senshi-tachi (Japanese: ドラゴンボールZ 激突!!100億パワーの戦士たち; lit. 'Dragon Ball Z: Fight! 10 Billion Power Warriors'), is a 1992 Japanese anime science fiction martial arts film and the sixth Dragon Ball Z film. It was originally released in Japan on March 7 at the Toei Anime Fair along with the second Dragon Quest: Dai no Daibōken film and the third Magical Taruruto-kun film. It was preceded by Dragon Ball Z: Cooler's Revenge and followed by Dragon Ball Z: Super Android 13!.

== Plot ==
The Namekian people, now living on a new planet after their home world was destroyed by Frieza years prior, find New Namek under siege by a mysterious, sentient spaceship that has latched onto and begun attacking their home. Dende, now the Earth's guardian, senses the plight of his people and telepathically calls on Goku for help.

Goku, Gohan, Krillin, Piccolo, Oolong, Yajirobe and Master Roshi travel to the New Namek and upon arrival encounter an army of large robots abusing the Namekians. They learn that Frieza's older brother Cooler, who Goku was thought to have killed, is responsible. Now with a metallic body, Cooler reveals that he will absorb the planet and its lifeforms to power his ship. Goku fights Cooler while the others battle his robots with durable armor that they struggle to penetrate. All except Piccolo are captured along with a village of Namekians.

Piccolo manages to destroy all of the robots with one large ki attack before making his way to rescue those who were captured. Elsewhere, Goku struggles against Cooler's new "Meta-Cooler" form, which allows him to regenerate himself. Cooler also reveals his ability to use the instantaneous movement technique, an ability which Goku also uses. Cooler explains that his ship constantly monitors his body, fixes any damage it might incur, and improves his design to increase his durability. Goku transforms into a Super Saiyan, which is also ineffective against Meta-Cooler. Vegeta arrives, saving Goku from being strangled.

The two Super Saiyans attack Meta-Cooler together and destroy him. However, his ship recreates 1000 manifestations of Meta-Cooler, decisively tipping the balance of power against the Saiyans. Goku and Vegeta attempt one final defense but are captured and transported to be converted into fuel.

As his ship leeches their energy, Cooler explains that after his defeat, his brain was absorbed by and fused with the remnants of a spacecraft's computer system, of which he eventually took control. Goku and Vegeta begin to release all their ki, which overloads the system. They encounter the true biological Cooler, whom Goku manages to kill with a ki blast. Piccolo arrives and encounters a Meta-Cooler, which explodes. The Meta-Coolers and robot soldiers subsequently explode, and the heroes escape before the ship leaves New Namek's orbit and explodes.

Goku and Vegeta fall from the sky near their allies, and everyone rejoices in the victory. In his spaceship, Vegeta crushes the computer chip that created Cooler's ship.

== Cast ==
Character name	Voice actor			
Character name	Japanese	English		
Character name	Japanese	Audio Captain Productions/Creative Products Corp. (1996)	Unknown/AB Groupe (c. 2001)	Funimation (2002)
Goku	Masako Nozawa	Nesty Calvo Ramirez	David Gasman	Sean Schemmel
Gohan	Masako Nozawa	E.J. Galang	Jodi Forrest	Stephanie Nadolny
Piccolo	Toshio Furukawa	Ray Buyco	Big Green	Christopher Sabat
Piccolo	Toshio Furukawa	Ray Buyco	Paul Bandey	Christopher Sabat
Vegeta	Ryō Horikawa	Ray Buyco	Doug Rand	Christopher Sabat
Metal Coola (メタルクウラ, Metaru Kūra)	Ryūsei Nakao	Apollo Abraham	Metal Cooler	Meta-Cooler
Metal Coola (メタルクウラ, Metaru Kūra)	Ryūsei Nakao	Apollo Abraham	Ed Marcus	Andrew Chandler
Kuririn	Mayumi Tanaka	Kririn	Clearin	Krillin
Kuririn	Mayumi Tanaka	Apollo Abraham	Sharon Mann	Sonny Strait
Yajirobe	Mayumi Tanaka	Ethel Lizano	Ed Marcus	Mike McFarland
Kame-sen'nin	Kōhei Miyauchi	Master Buten	Ed Marcus	Master Roshi
Kame-sen'nin	Kōhei Miyauchi	Nesty Calvo Ramirez	Ed Marcus	Mike McFarland
Oolong	Naoki Tatsuta	Apollo Abraham	David Gasman	Brad Jackson
Dende	Tomiko Suzuki	Hazel Lizano	Paul Bandey	Laura Bailey
Mr. Popo	Toku Nishio	Apollo Abraham	Doug Rand	Christopher Sabat
Moori	Kinpei Azusa	Apollo Abraham	Doug Rand	Christopher Sabat
Guide Robo (誘導ロボット, Yūdō robotto)	Toshio Kobayashi	Ethel Lizano	Sharon Mann	Chris Forbis
Narrator	Jōji Yanami	Bob Karry	Ed Marcus	Kyle Hebert

A fourth English dub produced and released exclusively in Malaysia by Speedy Video features an unknown cast.

== Music ==
- OP (Opening Theme):
  - "Cha-La Head-Cha-La"
    - Lyrics by Yukinojō Mori
    - Music by Chiho Kiyooka
    - Arranged by Kenji Yamamoto
    - Performed by Hironobu Kageyama
- ED (Ending Theme):
  - Hero (Kimi ga Hīrō) (HERO(キミがヒーロー), "Hero (You're The Hero)")
    - Lyrics by Dai Satō
    - Music by Chiho Kiyooka
    - Arranged by Kenji Yamamoto
    - Performed by Hironobu Kageyama and Yuka

=== English dub soundtracks ===
The score for the English dub's composed by Mark Menza. The Double Feature DVD release contains an alternate audio track containing the English dub with original Japanese background music by Shunsuke Kikuchi, an opening theme of "Cha-La Head-Cha-La", and the ending theme "Hero (You're the Hero)".

The dub made in the Philippines contained English versions of the Japanese opening and ending theme songs, performed by Gino Padilla along with a children's chorus known as the Age of Wonder. These songs were featured on the album Dragon Ball • Dragon Ball Z: Songs of a High Spirited Saga - Volume I, along with other English versions of Dragon Ball and Dragon Ball Z songs.

== Releases ==
It was released on DVD and VHS in North America on August 13, 2002. It was later released in Double Feature set along with Cooler's Revenge (1991) for Blu-ray and DVD on November 11, 2008, both feature full 1080p format in HD remastered 16:9 aspect ratio and an enhanced 5.1 surround mix. The film was re-released to DVD in remastered thinpak collection on December 6, 2011, containing the second 4 Dragon Ball Z films.

=== Other companies ===
In the Philippines, Creative Products Corporation produced an English-dubbed feature-length film titled Dragon Ball Z: The Greatest Rivals, which combined an edited version this film with its predecessor. This feature was released in over 30 Metro Manila theaters on July 11, 1996. Later that year, on November 6, it received an extremely limited VHS release, only sold at Dragon Ball-based promotional events that were hosted by Gino Padilla, who performed the theme music for this version.
