= Schomburg: The Man Who Built a Library =

2017 children's book by Carole Boston Weatherford

- First edition cover
- Author: Carole Boston Weatherford
- Publisher: Candlewick Press
- Publication date: September 12, 2017
- Pages: 48
- Awards: Golden Kite Award (2018); Walter Dean Myers Award (2018)
- ISBN: 978-0-7636-8046-6

Schomburg: The Man Who Built a Library is a 2017 non-fiction children's book written by Carole Boston Weatherford and illustrated by Eric Velasquez. It provides a biography of Arturo Alfonso Schomburg, a Puerto Rican-American bibliophile and curator.

The book was well-received by critics. In 2018, it won a Walter Dean Myers Award and Golden Kite Award, among other honors.

== Reception ==
=== Reviews ===
Schomburg was well received by critics, including starred reviews from Booklist, Kirkus Reviews, Publishers Weekly, and Shelf Awareness.

Kirkus Reviews called the book "a fascinating and inspiring biography" that "shines a light on a little-known figure."

Reviewers praised Weatherford's engaging and accessible prose, with Booklist's Karen Cruze noting that Weatherford "brings Schomburg's story to life with vivid language and meticulous research." Publishers Weekly praised Weatherford's ability to "convey the significance of Schomburg's work" and noted that the book is "a testament to the power of libraries and education." Jen Forbes, writing for Shelf Awareness, praised the book's "lyrical language" and noted that it is "a must-read for anyone interested in history, libraries, or the African diaspora." School Library Journal's MaryAnn Karre praised the book's "vivid descriptions".

Booklist also praised the illustrations by Eric Velasquez, noting that they "add a rich visual dimension to the text." They also praised Ron Butler's narration for bringing "energy and enthusiasm" to the story.

=== Awards and honors ===
Schomburg is a Junior Library Guild book.

Kirkus Reviews and Shelf Awareness named Schomburg among the best picture books of 2017, and the Center for the Study of Multicultural Children's Literature name it one of the best multicultural children's books of the year. The following year, Booklist included it on their "Top 10 Biographies for Youth" and "Top 10 Diverse Nonfiction for Older and Middle Readers" lists. The Association for Library Service to Children included it on their list of the year's "Notable Children's Books", and Capitol Choices included it on their list of "Noteworthy Books for Children (7-10)".

Awards for Schomburg
Year	Award	Result	Ref.
2018	AAUW NC Award for Young People’s Literature	Won	
2018	Carter G. Woodson Book Award (Middle Level)	Honor	
2018	Golden Kite Award for Non-Fiction for Younger Readers	Won	
2018	Jefferson Cup Award	Honor	
2018	Walter Dean Myers Award for Young Readers	Won	
2018	YALSA Award for Excellence in Nonfiction	Nominated	

== Adaptations ==
Dreamscape adapted the book into a 52-minute film.
