= The Roots of Rap =

2019 nonfiction children's book

- Author: Carole Boston Weatherford
- Illustrator: Frank Morrison
- Publisher: little bee books
- Publication date: January 14, 2019
- ISBN: 978-1-499-80411-9

The Roots of Rap: 16 Bars on the 4 Pillars of Hip-Hop is a 2019 nonfiction children's book written by Carole Boston Weatherford and illustrated by Frank Morrison.

== Reception ==
=== Reviews ===
The Roots of Rap was well received by critics, including starred reviews from Booklist, Kirkus Reviews, and Publishers Weekly.

Reviewers praised Weatherford's use of language, with Booklist's Kathleen McBroom noting that her "free-verse poetry is as dynamic as the music it celebrates." Kirkus Reviews called the book "a high-energy, informative, and utterly engaging tribute to the genre," while Publishers Weekly praised Weatherford's ability to "convey the excitement and creativity of hip-hop's early days."

School Library Journal praised the book's "vibrant, energetic" poetry and noted that it would be "a great addition to any middle school or high school library," citing its potential to appeal to reluctant readers and spark further exploration of hip-hop culture.

=== Awards and honors ===
The Roots of Rap is a Junior Library Guild book. Kirkus Reviews and the New York Public Library named it among the best picture books of 2019, and the Chicago Public Library named it among the year's Best Informational Books for Younger Readers. Booklist also included it on their 2019 list of the "Top 10 Arts Books for Youth".

The Roots of Rap was a 2020 Golden Kite Award honor book.
