= Key the Metal Idol =

1994 original video animation anime series directed by Hiroaki Sato

- The first volume of the American DVD release

キィ・ザ・メタル・アイドル (Kii Za Metaru Aidoru)
- Created by: Hiroaki Satō
- Original video animation
- Directed by: Hiroaki Satō
- Produced by: Shigehiro Suzuki; Atsushi Tanuma
- Written by: Hiroaki Satō
- Music by: Tamiya Terashima
- Studio: Studio Pierrot
- Licensed by: NA: Discotek Media
- Released: December 16, 1994 – August 7, 1996
- Runtime: 25–30 minutes (each)
- Episodes: 13
- Anime film series
- Directed by: Hiroaki Satō (Chief); Shigeru Ueda
- Produced by: Ryunosuke Tsuno; Eriko Aoki; Utako Shirakawa
- Written by: Hiroaki Satō
- Music by: Tamiya Terashima
- Studio: Studio Pierrot
- Licensed by: NA: Discotek Media
- Released: March 21, 1997 – June 18, 1997
- Runtime: 90 minutes (each)
- Films: 2

Key the Metal Idol (キィ・ザ・メタル・アイドル, Kii Za Metaru Aidoru) is a Japanese original video animation (OVA) series that was released from December 1994 to June 1997. The series consists of fifteen episodes divided into four parts. First Program consists of episodes 1 through 7. Second Program is 8 through 13. Third Program and Final Program are feature length (a.k.a. episodes 14 and 15) respectively. Key is a serious and somewhat dark drama with elements of mecha and science fiction.

== Plot ==
The central character of the story is Tokiko Mima (nicknamed "Key"), who believes herself to be a robot crafted by her scientist grandfather, Murao Mima. Every year, on her birthday, Key believes Dr. Mima builds her a new body, each one size larger. Upon his deathbed, Mima records his will on audio tape, revealing that Key can become human with the aid of 30,000 friends. Key believes she must do this quickly before her battery runs down, and attempts to gain the amount of friends by becoming a Japanese idol. The series details the slow unraveling of Key's identity and a secret conspiracy bent on controlling her unique supernatural abilities she develops over the course of the narrative.

== Setting ==
Mamio Valley
A small town in a secluded, rural area of Japan, the hometown of Key's grandmother. Dr. Mima eventually moved to Mamio Valley, where he met and married Tomiko. The Shinto shrine at Mamio valley is dedicated to Ame-no-Uzume. The maternal line of Tomiko's family were traditionally miko at that shrine, and all exhibited supernatural powers.
Ajo Heavy Industries
A large robotics corporation, of which Jinsaku Ajo is the President and CEO. While Ajo Heavy Industries is not legally allowed to export weapons, Ajo is using the company to develop and illegally sell his robot soldiers to foreign countries.
Production Minos
A show business production agency that is wholly owned by Ajo Heavy Industries. Production Minos officially exists to market Miho Utsuse's music and concert program. In reality, it is a front for the further development and promotion of the PPOR robot. The "Miho" which appears on stage, as well as her backing band, are actually PPOR robots.
V & A
A company owned by Seiichi Tamari. V&A's main business is the production of pornographic videos and magazines. Key ends up at the V&A "office" during the first episode. The name "V&A" is a bit of a joke. In Japan, pornographic videos are often abbreviated "AV" for "Adult Video". "V&A" is just these two letters switched around.

== Characters ==
Tokiko "Key" Mima
Voiced by: Junko Iwao (Japanese); Nicole Oliver (English)
Tokiko, nicknamed Key, is the robotic granddaughter of Murao and Tomiko Mima. She is almost always very timid, quiet and expressionless. She lived with Dr. Mima and his assistant Wakagi until she was seventeen, when Dr. Mima died in a mysterious accident. Key received his will on tape, urging her to find 30,000 friends, which would make her human. Somehow, Key is able to become an extremely powerful human for short period of time during extreme emotional stress. Key's presence is disruptive to Ajo's PPOR robots, and Ajo is fascinated and horrified by her. Key's best friend is Sakura, whom she was in junior high with.
Dr. Murao Mima
Voiced by: Kouichi Kitamura (Japanese); Harvey Gold (English)
Dr. Mima is Key's grandfather, a kindly scientist and puppet craftsman. His expertise in engineering and puppeteering led him to become one of the leading pioneers of robotics. However, upon meeting his wife Tomiko in Mamio Valley, he became interested in the use of her supernatural powers in robotic design. He later developed a technique for constructing and operating robots, known as the Mima Formula, but Mima eventually halted his work after realizing his research depended heavily on testing on his wife and daughter.
Tomoyo Wakagi
Voiced by: Yanaka Hiroshi (Japanese); David Kaye (English)
Dr. Mima's research assistant, as well as Key's bodyguard and protector. He has experience in the military, but has been affected by something that happened in the last war, as well as a feud with Sergei. He is a skilled fighter and wields many unconventional weapons, including a wrist-mounted slingshot that fires explosive bullets. He also carries an electronic device resembling a laptop computer for detecting Gel emissions and their source.
Sakura Kuriyagawa
Voiced by: Miki Nagasawa (Japanese); Megan Leitch (English)
Sakura is Key's oldest friend, an independent and kind young woman who is very protective of Key. She and Key attended the same junior high in Mamio Valley, where they became friends because they were both outcasts. Sakura moved to Tokyo where she works several jobs, including delivering pizza, running a video store, and directing traffic at construction sites. She rescues Key from Tamari's "studio" while delivering pizza, and later lets Key stay with her.
Shuichi Tataki
Voiced by: Toshiyuki Morikawa (Japanese); Jerry J. Todd (eps 1-9), Peter Kelamis (eps 10-15) (English)
Tataki is a very close friend of Sakura, and later a big supporter of Key and her emerging career as an idol. He is a big fan of Miho Utsuse and is the president of her fan club, very knowledgeable about her career and music, but is frustrated by Production Minos's extreme secrecy. Tataki is also a big fan of martial arts and weight lifting.
Sergei / D
Voiced by: Jurota Kosugi (Japanese); David Sobolov (eps 1-10), Mark Gibbon (eps 11-15) (English)
Sergei, known most often by his code name D, works for Ajo and is charged with special missions. He is very cold and aggressive, skilled at operating the PPOR robots and follows various military tactics. He also possesses superhuman strength and endurance, as a result of artificial enhancement. He is sometimes seen taking in Gel as a way to retain his strength.
Prince Snake-Eye
Voiced by: Eken Mine (Japanese); Don Brown (English)
Prince Snake-Eye is the leader of a religious cult, The Church of the Golden Snake Savior. He has convinced his followers that he has supernatural powers, but is good at heart. Snake-Eye claims to have received divine revelation from "The Golden Snake King" when he was bitten by a poisonous snake during a trip through Mamio Valley. Snake-Eye is among the first to realize that Key has some kind of extreme power, and fascinated by her, tries to convince Key to use her powers for healing in his cult.
Miho Utsuse
Voiced by: Chiyako Shibahara (Japanese); Saffron Henderson (English)
Miho is an extremely popular idol singer and rock star. After viewing one of her concert videos, Key decides that she wants to be like Miho. Miho becomes Key's role model, with Key hoping if she can muster tens of thousands of fans like Miho, then surely Key will become human. Miho was scouted into showbusiness by Tamari, then commissioned to Production Minos. Ajo uses her in his experiments, and the "Miho" seen on stage is actually a humanoid PPOR robot controlled by Miho from a distance. This process is extremely strenuous on Miho's health.
Hikaru Tsurugi
Voiced by: Shin-ichiro Miki (Japanese); Brian Drummond (English)
Tsurugi, considered a young prodigy by most, is a famed dance choreographer, producer, live performance director, author and screenplay writer. Tsurugi was hired by Production Minos to assist with Miho's promotion, responsible for choreography and voice coaching. After Miho's rise to stardom, Tsurugi was shut off from Miho, feeling betrayed by the way she seemed to absorb all his secrets of showbusiness. Tsurugi later discovered Key, and became interested in teaching her after seeing her briefly be human.
Seiichi Tamari
Voiced by: Kenichi Ono
Tamari is the owner of V&A, a seedy company that produces low-budget adult videos. He also acts as a talent scout, finding girls who might make it big as idols, and then delivering them to major talent agencies in exchange for commissions. Slick and laidback, he is not above using coercion or violence to further his business. Tamari originally scouted Miho into the music industry, but has shown interest in Sakura as well. After having his life saved by Key, he has a change of heart and becomes a strong supporter of her.
Jinsaku Ajo
Voiced by: Shou Hayami (Japanese); John Novak (English)
Ajo is the president of Ajo Heavy Industries and Production Minos. He has a strong fascination (perhaps even a fetish) for mechanical parts and mechanisms, especially the clockwork automatons he collects. Ajo was originally an officer in the Japanese Army during World War II. His fascination with Automatons and his military experience sent him into the weapons business, where he developed the PPOR robot, partially by stealing research notes from Dr. Mima. His goal is to perfect and sell the PPOR as a remote-controlled robot soldier, and for that he needs secrets that only Dr. Mima knows.
Staff A, B, and C
Voiced by: Ogata Mitsuru (A), Daiki Nakamura (B), Jun'ichi Sugawara (C) (Japanese); Ward Perry (A), Michael Dobson (C) (English)
These are three young, codenamed scientists who work on Ajo's secret projects for both Ajo Heavy Industries and Production Minos. They are usually seen doing PPOR testing and Gel extraction. Though they are highly paid, Ajo is not above using violence to ensure they obey his orders and maintain secrecy.

== Mecha & other ==
PPOR Robot
A type of humanoid combat robot developed by Ajo Heavy Industries. In its standard configuration, it looks like a humanoid skeleton. PPOR robot technology is based on the Mima Formula. The robot is powered and controlled by a component Ajo calls the power box, which is filled with gel. The PPOR is both significantly stronger and heavier than a human but are capable of performing many of the same actions as a human. The operator of a PPOR can talk through a microphone; the words are in turn "spoken" by the PPOR. Controlling a PPOR is an extremely strenuous process and they are prone to malfunction, as the PPORs are far from being fully developed.
Gel
A pink gelatinous substance that contains a person's will and life force. In its natural form, it is colder than dry ice, and must be kept contained or it will dissipate. Gel can be forcibly extracted from a person through the use of the proper kind of machine. However, this process weakens the person significantly, as gel extraction is literally the process of pumping away a person's life. If too much gel is extracted, the person becomes comatose and may even die. On the other hand, gel is a powerful medicine that can heal anything. If a healthy person is injected with Gel they become stronger than a normal human, as is the case with Sergei. Dr. Mima discovered that Gel may be used as power source and control mechanism for robots, but once he learned the truth about the gel extraction process he halted his research on moral grounds, something which Ajo was not happy about. Ajo Heavy Industries collects gel from human sources, such as homeless people or enemies of the company, in order to fuel PPORs.
Mima Formula
A set of principles or rules for the construction and operation of robots, based on Gel as a kind of fuel and control mechanism. The basic principle is that gel can be extracted from a person and placed into the robot. The gel then powers the robot and also allows it to be controlled only by the person who provided the gel. The Mima Formula states that gel that has been extracted from a person will only work with its original owner, and that gel extracted from different people cannot co-exist in the same container. This is why Sergei can control the original PPORs quite well, as they run on the gel from him, and why Ajo's scientists cannot properly operate the PPORs.

== Release ==
Key the Metal Idol, was originally produced and sold as an "experimental" title, with the original release media (VHS Tapes and LDs) priced very low, at 2,500 yen for a single-episode tape or 5,800 yen for a 3-episode LD, with the first episode retailing at 1000 yen. This was less than half the typical price of OVA titles at the time. As the series progressed, the episode lengths and volume costs continued to increase. The final volumes were priced 9,500 yen each, which was consistent with other titles at the time.

The series is also unusual in that the episodes are of varying length. The first thirteen episodes are approximately 25–30 minutes each. The final two episodes are 90 minutes each. In addition to the OVA series, Radio Drama CDs were made. The anime and soundtrack were released in the United States by Viz Video on eight VHS tapes and three DVDs in 1997–2000, and later all together as a box set in 2004.

The anime was re-licensed by Discotek Media and it was released on DVD on February 28, 2017.

No.	Title	Directed by	Original release date
1	"Startup"; Transliteration: "Kidō" (Japanese: 起動)	Kazunori Mizuno	16 December 1994
2	"Cursor I"; Transliteration: "Kāsoru I" (Japanese: カーソル I)	Masashi Abe	17 February 1995
3	"Cursor II"; Transliteration: "Kāsoru II" (Japanese: カーソル II)	Nobuhiro Kondo	1 March 1995
4	"Access"; Transliteration: "Akusesu" (Japanese: アクセス)	Akira Mano	5 April 1995
5	"Scroll I"; Transliteration: "Sukurōru I" (Japanese: スクロール I)	Masashi Abe	7 June 1995
6	"Scroll II"; Transliteration: "Sukurōru II" (Japanese: スクロール II)	Nobuhiro Kondo	5 July 1995
7	"Run"; Transliteration: "Ran" (Japanese: ラン)	Yorifusa Yamaguchi	2 August 1995
8	"Go To"; Transliteration: "Gōtū" (Japanese: ゴートゥー)	Kazunori Mizuno	7 February 1996
9	"Return"; Transliteration: "Ritān" (Japanese: リターン)	Koji Masunari	6 March 1996
10	"Bug"; Transliteration: "Bagu" (Japanese: バグ)	Yorifusa Yamaguchi	3 April 1996
11	"Save"; Transliteration: "Sēbu" (Japanese: セーブ)	Takashi Watanabe	2 May 1996
12	"Virus I"; Transliteration: "Vairasu I" (Japanese: ヴァイラス I)	Yorifusa Yamaguchi	3 July 1996
13	"Virus II"; Transliteration: "Vairasu II" (Japanese: ヴァイラス II)	Kazunori Mizuno	7 August 1996
14 (film 1)	"System"; Transliteration: "Shisutemu" (Japanese: システム)	Shigeru Ueda	21 March 1997
15 (film 2)	"Exit"; Transliteration: "Shūryō" (Japanese: 終了)	Shigeru Ueda	18 June 1997
