= Let the Children March =

2018 book by Monica Clark-Robinson

- Author: Monica Clark-Robinson
- Illustrator: Frank Morrison
- Language: English
- Genre: Children's picture book
- Publisher: Houghton Mifflin Harcourt
- Publication date: 2018
- Publication place: United States
- Media type: Print (hardcover)
- Pages: 40
- Awards: Coretta Scott King Award
- ISBN: 9781328466488
- OCLC: 51799

Let the Children March is a 2018 children's picture book written by Monica Clark-Robinson and illustrated by Frank Morrison, originally published by Houghton Mifflin Harcourt. The historical fiction work is set during the Birmingham Children's Crusade in 1963. The book was named a Coretta Scott King Illustrator Honor Book in 2019.

== Synopsis ==
The book is written from the point of view of a young African-American girl growing up in Birmingham, Alabama. Her family hears Martin Luther King Jr. call for peaceful protest. After her parents express fear, the girl and her brother decide they will march instead. Dr. King expresses concern but allows the children to organize.

On May 2, the children meet at a church and begin to march. The girl is afraid of the angry crowd, but continues on, even through vicious dogs, water hoses, and threats of prison time try to stop them. On the third day of the march, she is jailed. She and other children sing "We Shall Overcome" and other civil rights songs while in the cell. The march continues, and the girl hears from her father that John F. Kennedy has started to be concerned about the hate. The girl and her brother are released from prison and the announcement of desegregation floods the city. The book ends with the two siblings playing at playgrounds and eating at places they were never allowed to visit before.

== Background ==
Author Monica Clark-Robinson first heard about the march on Martin Luther King Jr. Day in 2010. The story made such an impression on her that she began writing. Clark-Robinson spoke with and e-mailed people who were at the Birmingham Children's Crusade as background research. Since she was writing a book for children, Clark-Robinson says that she had to leave out "truly upsetting details" that would "scare young readers". She entered the book into a contest sponsored by the Society of Children's Book Writers and Illustrators and was chosen as a finalist. The book began to gain popularity, eventually making its way to Houghton Mifflin Harcourt, which suggested Frank Morrison illustrate it.

In his artist's statement, illustrator Frank Morrison reflected on the time he watched the documentary Eyes on the Prize and was horrified to see the children sprayed with water hoses. He expressed hope that his works "honor the past". Morrison's illustrations were done in oil paint on illustration board.

== Reception ==
Kirkus Reviews called Let the Children March "one of the best books of 2018" and "a powerful retrospective glimpse at a key event". The School Library Journal praised the book by referring to it as "a highly readable historical account which deserves a place on picture book and nonfiction shelves alike." Amina Chaudhri, a reviewer for Booklist Online, loved Morrison's paintings, which brought to life the passion of the children, the hate of the crowd and realities of the jail cell.

The book was named a Coretta Scott King Illustrator Honor Book in 2019.
