= Jynx =

Pokémon species

- Pokémon character
- Jynx artwork by Ken Sugimori
- First game: Pokémon Red and Blue (1996)
- Designed by: Ken Sugimori (finalized)
- Voiced by: Mayumi Tanaka; Chie Satō; Chiyako Shibahara

In-universe information
- Species: Pokémon
- Gender: Female-only
- Type: Ice and Psychic

Jynx (/ˈdʒɪŋks/), known in Japan as Rougela (Japanese: ルージュラ, Hepburn: Rūjura), is a Pokémon species in Nintendo and Game Freak's Pokémon franchise. Jynx first appeared in the video games Pokémon Red and Blue and sequels, later appearing in various merchandise, spinoff titles, or animated and printed adaptations of the franchise. While no English voice actors have been attributed for the character, in Japan they have been voiced by Mayumi Tanaka, Chie Satō, and Chiyako Shibahara.

Jynx's design and humanoid appearance has been criticized by media outlets, including cultural critic Carole Boston Weatherford, who described Jynx as representing blackface after seeing the character's depiction in the anime. Due to complaints, Game Freak modified its appearance by changing the original color of its skin from black to the current color, purple.

== Design and characteristics ==
Jynx is a species of fictional creatures called Pokémon created for the Pokémon media franchise. Developed by Game Freak and published by Nintendo, the Japanese franchise began in 1996 with the video games Pokémon Red and Green for the Game Boy, which were released in North America as Pokémon Red and Blue in 1998. In these games and their sequels, the player assumes the role of a Trainer whose goal is to capture and use the creatures' special abilities to combat other Pokémon. Some Pokémon can transform into stronger species through a process called evolution via various means, such as exposure to specific items. Each Pokémon has one or two elemental types, which define its advantages and disadvantages when battling other Pokémon. A major goal in each game is to complete the Pokédex, a comprehensive Pokémon encyclopedia, by capturing, evolving, and trading with other Trainers to obtain individuals from all Pokémon species.

Introduced in Red and Blue, the design started as pixel art sprites by the development team, with a single color identity chosen to work within the Super Game Boy hardware limitations. While conceived as a group effort by multiple developers at Game Freak, the finalized design and artwork was done by Ken Sugimori. Originally tasked with drawing the characters to illustrate a planned strategy guide by Game Freak when the games released, Sugimori drew all the sprites for the game in his style to not only unify their designs visually but also modify any design elements he felt were amiss, while trying to retain the original sprite artists' unique style.

Jynx is known as "Rougela" in Japanese. When translating the game for Western audiences, Nintendo gave the Pokémon species "clever and descriptive names" related to their appearance or features to make them more relatable for American children. As a result, Rougela were renamed "Jynx", a play on the word "jinx". Also known as the "Human Shape" Pokémon, Jynx is a female-only species that resembles the Japanese mythical creature Yuki-onna. Originally portrayed with a black face and dark blue hands, Jynx's design was changed to purple coloration after critiques that it perpetuated racism. Smoochum, a Pokémon introduced in Pokémon Gold and Silver, can evolve into Jynx when it receives enough experience from battles and reaches level thirty.

Standing 4 feet 7 inches (109 cm) tall and classified as an Ice- and Psychic-type Pokémon, Jynx walk in a dance-like fashion, wiggling their hips in a manner described in Red, Blue, and LeafGreen as "seductive". It uses dancing to communicate, with the exact rhythm relying on its emotion at the time. The dance affects people, causing them to themselves dance with no regard to their actions. Jynx speak in a language that only other Jynx can understand, though the sound is described as similar to human speech. This trait is carried on to games where Pokémon speak English such as the Pokémon Mystery Dungeon series, with the text appearing as combinations of "X"s, "O"s, punctuation marks, and/or musical notes, instead of legible words. Jynx are psychic, and can attack by kissing an opponent, and can additionally protect themselves with a psychically-generated barrier.

At one point in development of sequel titles Pokémon X and Y, Jynx was originally intended to have a stronger temporary evolution. Called Mega Jynx, its appearance would have changed to give it a blue dress with white sparkles, extended hair that would have flowed more freely and dragged on the floor, and black eyes with multiple swirls within. Though Jynx's trademark was renewed in preparation for the form, the concept did not proceed past the concept art phase, and was cut from the final games around a year prior to the release of the games. An unused cry for the form remained in the data of the 2020 cloud storage game Pokémon Home, and was discovered through datamining several years prior to the leak.

== Appearances ==
Jynx originally appeared in Pokémon Red and Blue, then appeared in many subsequent installments in the series, including Pokémon Gold and Silver, which introduced its baby form, Smoochum, Pokémon X and Y, Pokémon Ultra Sun and Ultra Moon, and Pokémon Sword and Shield, and Pokémon Brilliant Diamond and Shining Pearl. Outside of the main series, Jynx appears in a majority of Pokémon spin-off titles, including the Pokémon Snap series, Pokémon Stadium, the Pokémon Mystery Dungeon series, and Pokémon Go.

Outside of video games, Jynx first appeared in the Pokémon anime in "Holiday Hi-Jynx", where one of Santa Claus's Jynx was separated from him; Ash and friends helped to return the Jynx to her owner. The episode was not re-aired in the USA because of the controversy over her appearance. Jynx appeared again in the episode "The Ice Cave!", which was not aired in English-speaking countries for the same reason. Jynx later appears in Pokémon Orange Islands series, in episodes still present in American rotations. Jynx made an appearance in a contest in "All Things Bright and Beautifly". However, because Jynx had been animated with black skin instead of purple, her thirteen-second appearance was cut from the English dub. Jynx appears in episodes of Pokémon: Advanced Generation, with the purple skin color, but stopped appearing in the anime following this. While no English voice actor was credited for the roles, Jynx has been voiced in Japanese by Mayumi Tanaka, Chie Satō, and Chiyako Shibahara

Jynx has made a number of appearances in the Pokémon Trading Card Game. It first appeared in Base Set having a black-skinned design, and later with the purple-skin after Nintendo regained control of the Trading Card Game. Jynx later appeared in an illustration alongside the Vocaloid Meiko for Project Voltage—an official collaboration between Pokémon and Hatsune Miku, a popular Vocaloid software.

== Critical response ==
Jynx's original design has been heavily criticized as resembling blackface actors.

Jynx's original appearance and design have received criticism in various publications. Children's book author and cultural critic Carole Boston Weatherford published an article in the Greensboro News & Record alleging that Jynx's design bore a striking resemblance to blackface actors, an image which is racist against African Americans, and further described the Pokémon as "a dead ringer for an obese drag queen." She further criticized the Pokémon in the magazine Advertising Age, comparing it to Little Black Sambo and suggesting its English name as also a possible derogatory remark towards Black people relating to voodoo (with its original Japanese name, Rougela, being unrelated). The Advertising Age report was reprinted in an issue of Black People Today. Since then, the Jim Crow Museum of Racist Memorabilia at Ferris State University has listed Jynx as an example of racism in modern material. Later, the Jim Crow Museum published a letter by a reader of the aforementioned article, who disagreed with the museum's assertion that Jynx was deliberately racist by design. In response, Game Freak modified Jynx's design in localized versions of the games, a change which would several years later be reflected in the Japanese versions of the games and the anime series. In addition, episodes featuring the older Jynx design were censored or completely removed from televised syndication by The Pokémon Company International. After the anime episode "Three Jynx and a Baby!", Jynx also ceased to physically appear in the anime, although its pre-evolved form, Smoochum, has continued to appear in the anime, even after the aforementioned episode. Likely as a result of this controversy, Jynx has also been altered in various releases of Pokémon games featuring the black design, with the American Virtual Console rerelease of Pokémon Yellow changing its face and hands to purple, and the Virtual Console re-release of Pokémon Snap on the Wii and Wii U doing the same.

Criticisms still persisted, however. Washington Post writer Mary C. Morton described Jynx as having "explicitly, albeit grossly caricatured, womanly features", and challenged the assertion that the games crossed gender barriers with such. In the podcast, Retronauts, they emphasized it further, noting the design as "creepy" and that it still maintained the issue of racism. IGN also criticized the design, characterizing Jynx as a "transvestite midget in racially offensive makeup". GameDaily criticized it, citing its offensive stereotypes and the presence of breasts on the design. David Lozada of GameRevolution cited Jynx as being a particularly strange design due to its human-like appearance, criticizing its blackface-esque appearance. The book Pikachu's Global Adventure: The Rise and Fall of Pokémon considered Jynx's appearance in the anime to be a caricature of slavery due to the racial stereotypes present in Jynx's design, stating that "The Rujura (Jynx) are a crude cariacture of dark-skinned, primitive natives... the loyal native helpers use their physical labor and their black magic for the benefit of the white-skinned Santa Claus." It further criticized how the design denigrated African Americans. It has also been considered an example of the mammy stereotype.

In the book Gaming Cultures and Place in Asia-Pacific, David Surman defended Jynx's design, suggesting that Sugimori developed it—along with Mr. Mime—to draw upon the humor of heta-uma art (a term meaning bad/nice). The book notes that the designs "oscillate between the poles of good and bad," and as a result offer diversity within the game and invite scrutiny from players. The mystery the design presented also received positive commentary. It has also been argued that the perception of Jynx as racist was ignorant of its origins in Japanese mythology, and that it was harmless overall. In a survey where many were asked about how they felt about the censorship of Jynx, results varied, with some citing the change as unnecessary due to never having associated Jynx with racist imagery, while others wholeheartedly agreed with the censorship, citing the design's similarities to racist propaganda. Overall, it was decided that the censorship of Jynx was appropriate and did not negatively impact players of the series.

== See also ==
- Pokémon episodes removed from rotation, a list of episodes of the anime removed due to various controversies, including multiple episodes removed due to featuring Jynx.
- Mr. Popo, another character also labelled as a racist caricature.
