= Kinpei Azusa =

Japanese voice actor

Mitsuo Hashimoto (橋本 光雄, Hashimoto Mitsuo; May 1, 1931 – May 24, 1997), better known by the stage name Kinpei Azusa (あずさ 欣平, Azusa Kinpei), was a Japanese voice actor born in Fukushima Prefecture, Japan. He was employed by the talent management firm Aoni Production.

Between the ages of three and six, Azusa was trained in the theatre. At the age of five, he was given the name Kinzō Azusa. On May 1, 1962, Azusa undertook the establishment of a coaching foundation, Gekidan Geikyō (currently represented by Takeshi Aono). Azusa died in 1997 at the age of 66.

== Anime ==
=== TV ===
- Dragon Ball Z (Mūri)
  - Dragon Ball Z: Bardock – The Father of Goku (Grandpa Son Gohan)
- Dragon Quest (Chōrō)
  - Dragon Quest: The Adventure of Dai (King Romosu)
- Fortune Quest (Mishuran)
- Kiteretsu Daihyakka (Heikichi)
- Belle and Sebastian (Philippe)
- Paul no Miracle Taisakusen (Detective Tokkamēru)
- Pro Golfer Saru (Kyūsei)
- Time Bokan (Nariikin)

=== OVA ===
- Aladdin and the King of Thieves (Sultan)
- Legend of the Galactic Heroes (Wilhelm von Klopstock)
- The Return of Jafar (Sultan)

=== Movies ===
- The Castle of Cagliostro (Archbishop)
- Ge Ge Ge no Kitarō: Gekitotsu!! Ijigen Yōkai no Daihanran (Mizugi-sensei)
- Dragon Ball Z: The Return of Cooler (Mūri)
- Sangokushi 3: Haruka naru Daichi (Wang Lei)

== Voice-over work ==
- Keiji Eden: Tsuisekisha (Rebi)

== Production ==
Azusa produced or took part in the following plays, listed in alphabetical order.

- Daddy-Long-Legs
- Haha wo Tazunete
- The Wild Swans
- Ivan the Fool
- The Little Match Girl
- Poetical Collage
- Shi to Rōdoku no Yūbe
