= Floyd Cooper (Canadian football) =

Canadian football official

Floyd Cooper is a former official in the Canadian Football League, originally from Burlington, Ontario.
