= A. Van Jordan =

American poet (born 1965)

- Born: 1965 (age 60–61); Akron, Ohio, U.S.
- Education: Wittenberg University (B.A.); Howard University (M.A.); Warren Wilson College (MFA); Vermont College of Fine Arts (MFA)
- Occupations: Poet, professor
- Website: www.avanjordan.com

A. Van Jordan (born 1965) is an American poet. He is a professor at Stanford University and was previously a college professor in the Department of English Language & Literature at the University of Michigan and distinguished visiting professor at Ithaca College. He previously served as the first Henry Rutgers Presidential Professor at the Rutgers University-Newark. He is the author of four collections: Rise (2001), M-A-C-N-O-L-I-A (2005), Quantum Lyrics (2007), and The Cineaste (2013). Jordan's awards include a Whiting Writers Award, a Pushcart Prize and a Guggenheim Fellowship.

== Early life ==
Jordan graduated from Wittenberg University in 1987 with a B.A. degree in English Literature. He graduated from Howard University in 1990 with a master's degree in Organizational Communications. He graduated from Warren Wilson College in 1998 with a Master of Fine Arts (MFA) degree, and also holds an additional MFA in Screenwriting (2016) from the Vermont College of Fine Arts. He lived in Washington, D.C., from 1988 to 2002.

== Career ==
Jordan is the author of four full-length collections. Rise (Tia Chucha Press, 2001) won the PEN Oakland/Josephine Miles Literary Award. M-A-C-N-O-L-I-A (2005), about MacNolia Cox, which was listed as one of the Best Books of 2005 by The Times (London); Quantum Lyrics (2007); and The Cineaste (W.W. Norton & Co., 2013). In 2013 he published a chapbook called The Homesteader, and in 2021, he published an ekphrastic chapbook, I Want to See My Skirt, in collaboration with filmmaker Cauleen Smith, based on photographs by Malian photographer Malick Sidibé. Both of his chapbooks were published by Unicorn Press, Greensboro, NC, and edited by Andrew Saulters.

Jordan taught at Warren Wilson College, the University of North Carolina at Greensboro, the University of Texas at Austin, where he was tenured as an associate professor, and as professor at the University of Michigan. In 2014, he became Rutgers University-Newark's first Henry Rutgers Presidential Professor, before returning to the University of Michigan in 2017, where he serves as the Robert Hayden Collegiate Professor of English Language & Literature. His academic interests include the writing of poetry, the history of poetry in English, and cinematic studies.

His work has appeared in Ploughshares, and Callaloo, among other publications.

== Awards ==
- 2002: Whiting Award
- 2005: Anisfield-Wolf Book Awards
- 2006: Pushcart Prize XXX
- 2007: Guggenheim Fellowship
- 2008: United States Artist Williams Fellowship
- 2015: Lannan Literary Award in Poetry

== Works ==
- "Einstein Defining Special Relativity"; "Einstein Ruminates on Relativity", Reading Between A&B

=== Poetry ===
- Rise (Tia Chucha Press, 2001)
- M-A-C-N-O-L-I-A (W. W. Norton & Company, 2004)
- Quantum Lyrics (W. W. Norton & Company, 2007)
- The Cineaste (W. W. Norton & Company, 2013)

=== Essays ===
- "The Synchronicity of Scenes". Cortland Review. Winter 2007.

== Personal life ==
Jordan is married to Shirley Collado, a professor of psychology and former president of Ithaca College.
