= Chiyako Shibahara =

Japanese voice actress

Chiyako Shibahara (芝原 チヤコ, Shibahara Chiyako; born August 9, 1970 in Saitama Prefecture) is a Japanese voice actress. Previously affiliated with 81 Produce, she became a freelancer as of November 30, 2022.

== Filmography ==
=== Anime ===
- Akuei to Gacchinpo (Akuei)
- Bakkyuu HIT! Crash Bedaman (Sabu Nishijima)
- Bakusou Kyoudai Let's & Go WGP (Nieminen, Tamtam)
- Cardcaptor Sakura: The Movie (Xuehua Li)
- Duel Masters (Kintaro Nanba)
- Harimogu Harry (Gaburinu)
- Hyper Police (Sakura Bokuseiinmonzeninari)
- If It's for My Daughter, I'd Even Defeat a Demon Lord (Old Woman Venn)
- Key the Metal Idol (Beniko Komori, Miho Utsuse)
- Legend of Himiko (Kiyomizu)
- MegaMan NT Warrior (CutMan, BubbleMan)
- Midnight Horror School (Ampoo, Tubee)
- Nodame Cantabile TV (Kazuo (Puri Gorota - episode 7))
- Nodame Cantabile live action (Kazuo (Puri Gorota - episode 4))
- Outlaw Star (Iraga)
- Paranoia Agent (unnamed character in episode 3)
- Petite Princess Yucie (Kobold)
- Pikachu's Summer Vacation (Karakara)
- Pilot Candidate (Kyoko Farley)
- Pokémon (Fushigidane, Karakara)
- Pokémon: Mewtwo Returns (Scientist)
- Pokémon: The First Movie (miscellaneous voices)
- Rockman.EXE Axess (BubbleMan)
- Tokyo Godfathers (Eriko Kawasaki)

=== Video games ===
- Bakusou Kyoudai Let's & Go!! Eternal Wings (Nieminen)
- Klonoa Beach Volleyball (Chipple)

=== Dubbing ===
==== Live-action ====
- West Side Story (2014 Wowow edition) (Anybodys (Susan Oakes))

==== Animation ====
- Little Robots (Tiny)
- The Wild Thornberrys Movie (Eliza Thornberry)
