= Floyd Cooper (illustrator) =

American illustrator of children's books (1956–2021)

- Born: January 8, 1956; Tulsa, OK
- Died: July 15, 2021 (aged 65); Easton, PA
- Occupations: Author and Illustrator
- Writing career
- Genre: Children's picture books
- Notable works: Grandpa's Face by Eloise Greenfield; Unspeakable: The Tulsa Race Massacre by Carole Boston Weatherford
- Notable awards: Coretta Scott King Illustrator Award (2009, 2022); Coretta Scott King Illustrator Honor (1994, 1995, 1999); Caldecott Honor (2022)

Floyd Cooper (January 8, 1956 – July 15, 2021) was an American illustrator of children's books whose art frequently explored the African American experience. He was based in Easton, Pennsylvania, and worked with authors such as Jane Yolen, Nikki Grimes, Eloise Greenfield, Howard Bryant, Joyce Carol Thomas, and Bill Martin Jr, among others. He illustrated more than 100 titles.

== Personal ==
Floyd Donald Cooper Jr. was born in 1956 in Tulsa, Oklahoma, to Ramona (Williams) Cooper and Floyd Cooper Sr. His mother was a beautician while his father built houses. Floyd grew up in low income housing and attended 11 different elementary schools.

In school his teachers began to notice his illustrations and submitted his work to a scholarship committee. Floyd earned a scholarship to the University of Oklahoma, where he studied advertising. After graduating in 1978, Floyd worked for Hallmark Cards in Kansas City. He later moved to Manhattan where he struggled before he got his first contract with Penguin Books Floyd's first illustrated book was published in 1988 and written by Eloise Greenfield.

He married Velma Hyatt Cooper and they had two sons. He died of cancer on July 15, 2021, in Bethlehem, Pennsylvania.

== Technique ==
Cooper's artwork is known for using what he called an "oil erasure" subtractive technique, where he would "wash a board in oil paint and use a rubber eraser to methodically knead the paint away. He'd then create radiant images in soft, shimmering tones."

== Awards ==
Floyd won the Coretta Scott King Illustrator Award in 2009 and 2022. He was also selected for the Coretta Scott King Illustrator Honor in 1994, 1995, and 1999, and a Caldecott Honor in 2022.

Additionally, he won a Golden Kite Award for A Dance Like Starlight: One Ballerina’s Dream and a Charlotte Zolotow Award for Max and the Tag-Along Moon written by Floyd himself. Laura Charlotte received a Parents' Choice Award and a School Library Journal Best Books citation.

== Selected works ==
- Unspeakable: The Tulsa Race Massacre by Carole Boston Weatherford (2021)
- Max and the Tag-Along Moon by Floyd Cooper (2013)
- The Blacker the Berry by Joyce Carol Thomas (2008)
- Grandpa's Face by Eloise Greenfield (1988)
- Jump! From the Life of Michael Jordan by Floyd Cooper (2004)
- Brown Honey in Broomwheat Tea by Joyce Carol Thomas (1993)
- I Have Hear of a Land by Joyce Carol Thomas (1998)
- Caddie the Golf Dog by Michael Sampson and Bill Martin Jr (2002)
- The Ring Bearer by Floyd Cooper (2017)
- Juneteenth for Mazie by Floyd Cooper (2015)
- Coming Home: From the Life of Langston Hughes by Floyd Cooper (1994)
- Meet Danitra Brown by Nikki Grimes (1994)
- Sisters and Champions: The True Story of Venus and Serena Williams by Howard Bryant (2018)
- A Dance Like Starlight by Kristy Dempsey (2014)
- Laura Charlotte by Kathryn O. Galbraith (Philomel, 1990)
- These Hands
- Ruth and the Green Book
- Ben and the Emancipation Proclamation
- Brick by Brick
