= How Do You Spell Unfair? =

2023 nonfiction children's book

- Author: Carole Boston Weatherford
- Illustrator: Frank Morrison
- Publisher: Candlewick Press
- Publication date: April 11, 2023
- Pages: 40
- ISBN: 978-1-536-21554-0

How Do You Spell Unfair?: MacNolia Cox and the National Spelling Bee is a 2023 nonfiction children's book written by Carole Boston Weatherford and illustrated by Frank Morrison. It was well received by critics and was named one of the best children's books of the year by multiple sources.

== Summary ==
The book follows the story of eighth grader, MacNolia Cox who won both her school and citywide spelling bee, and was a top five finalist in the 1936 Scripps National Spelling Bee. The story begins with Cox advancing from her school spelling bee to the Akron, Ohio citywide spelling bee, where she faced 50 of the city's best spellers. In the final round of the spelling bee, Cox battles back and forth with John Huddleston, who then trips up on the word, "sciatic". After spelling "Voluble", Cox is declared the first African American winner of the Akron spelling bee. She wins $25 and a trip to the national spelling bee in Washington, DC. She attended many events honoring her success and raising money for her trip. In the city of Akron, she was considered famous. She received many gifts, including two dictionaries, a dress, and a necklace. She spent hours a day studying for the spelling bee. At the train station Cox was sent off by a military band and a crowd of over a thousand people, but soon faced increasing experiences of discrimination and racism. She was forced to move to a Blacks-only car when the train crossed into the South, and when they got to Washington, Cox and her mother had to stay with a Black doctor because the hotel for spelling bee participants was only for white customers. When the time for the spelling bee came, Cox was forced to climb up the back stairway instead of using the elevator, and was even forced to sit away from all spellers with the only other Black girl in the competition. Without letting this discrimination faze her, Cox stayed focused and nailed every word. Eventually she advanced to the final five. The judges, frustrated at Cox's progress, presented her with the word "nemesis", which at the time was a proper noun and not on the official list, and therefore not acceptable. Cox misspelled the word, eliminating her from the competition. The newspaper reporter and Cox's teacher protested, but the judges did not waver in their decision. Even though she did not win, Cox still made history as a finalist, and had a lot of fun sightseeing in Washington. Cox arrived home with a $75 prize, greeted by a big homecoming parade. She proved that African American students are as smart and capable as everyone else.

== Reception ==
=== Reviews ===
How Do You Spell Unfair was well received by critics, including starred reviews from Booklist, Kirkus Reviews, Publishers Weekly, and School Library Journal. Reviewers have Weatherford's lyrical prose and meticulous research in bringing to life the story of MacNolia Cox, the first African American finalist in the National Spelling Bee.

Booklist's Carolyn Phelan noted that Weatherford's "free-verse poetry is a perfect fit for this story, capturing the emotions and drama of the competition." Kirkus Reviews called the book "inspiring" and praised Weatherford's ability to "convey the excitement and tension of the competition." Publishers Weekly described the book as "a stirring tribute to a trailblazing young woman." John Scott, writing for School Library Journal, praised the book's "vivid language" and "compelling narrative," noting that it would be "an excellent addition to any elementary school library or classroom."

=== Awards and honors ===
How Do You Spell Unfair is a Junior Library Guild book. In 2013, Kirkus Reviews named it among the year's best picture books, Booklist included it on their "Booklist Editors' Choice: Books for Youth" list, and School Library Journal named it one of the year's best nonfiction books. The following year, Bank Street College of Education named it a book of "outstanding merit" for children ages five to nine. The same year, the Association for Library Service to Children and International Literacy Association (CL/R SIG) named it a notable children's book, and Booklist included it on their list of the "Top 10 History Books for Youth".

Awards for How Do You Spell Unfair?
Year	Award	Result	Ref.
2024	Coretta Scott King Award	Honor	
2024	Jane Addams Children's Book Award	Finalist	
2024	NAACP Image Award for Outstanding Literary Work – Children	Finalist	
