= Carole Boston Weatherford =

American author and critic (born 1956)

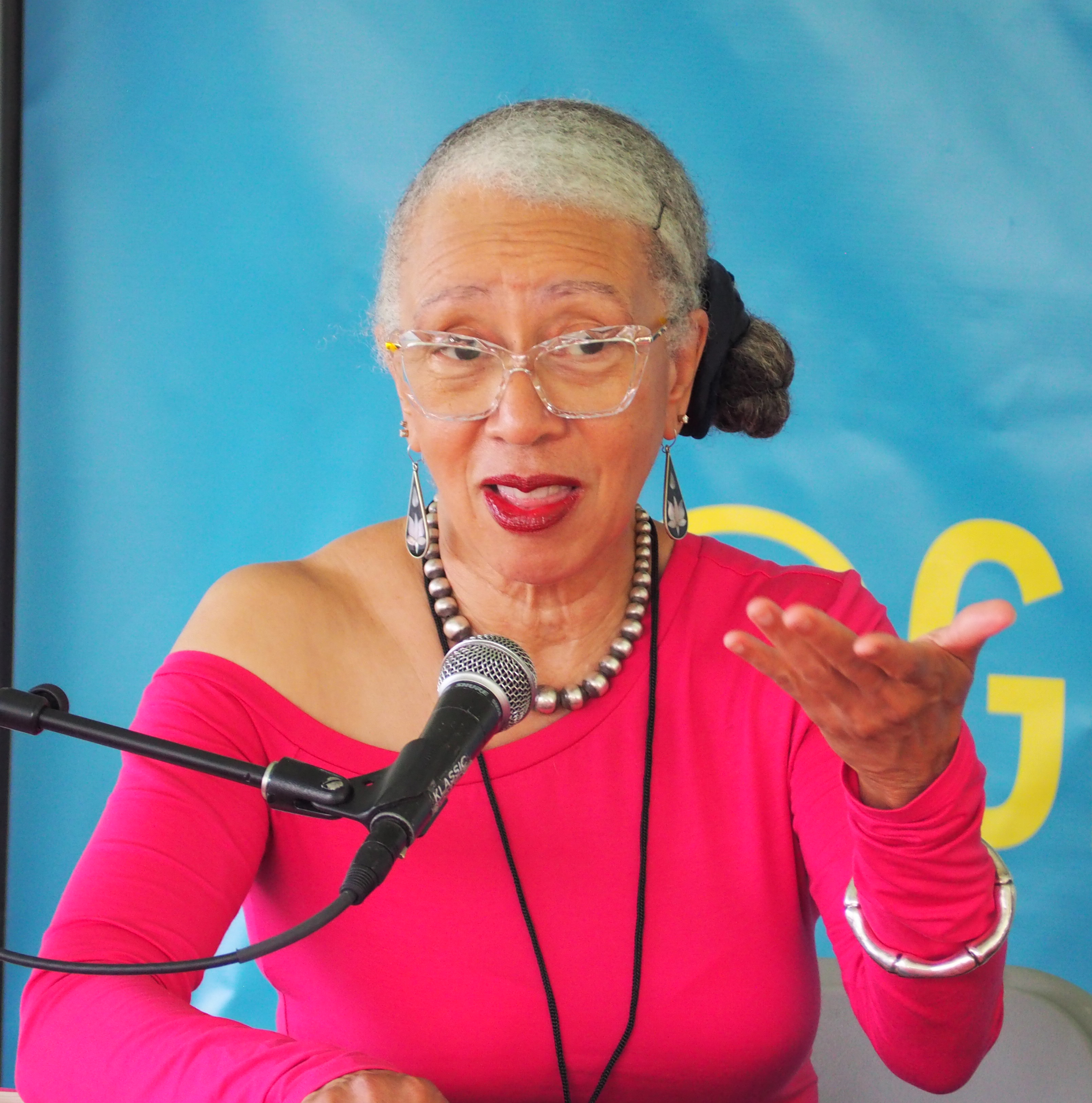
- Born: Carole Michele Boston; February 13, 1956 (age 70) Baltimore, Maryland, U.S.
- Education: American University (BA); University of North Carolina at Greensboro (MFA); University of Baltimore (MA)
- Notable works: Moses (2006), Before John Was a Jazz Giant (2007), Becoming Billie Holiday (2008), Voice of Freedom (2015), Freedom in Congo Square (2016), In Your Hands (2017), Schomburg: The Man Who Built a Library (2017), Unspeakable (2021), How Do You Spell Unfair? (2023)
- Notable awards: NAACP Image Award (2007); Charlotte Zolotow Award (2017); Walter Dean Myers Award (2018); Coretta Scott King Award (2022); Claudia Lewis Award (2024); Children's Literature Legacy Award (2025)

Carole Michele Weatherford (née Boston; born February 13, 1956) is an American author, critic, and poet. She has published over 50 children's books, primarily non-fiction and poetry. The music of poetry has fascinated Weatherford and motivated her literary career. She has won multiple awards for her books, including the 2022 Coretta Scott King Award for Author for her book Unspeakable: The Tulsa Race Massacre and the Children's Literature Legacy Award in 2025. As a critic, she is best known for her controversial criticism of Pokémon character Jynx and Dragon Ball character Mr. Popo.

== Early life and education ==
Carole Michele Boston was born February 13, 1956, in Baltimore to Joseph Alexander "Joe" Boston and Carolyn Virginia (Whitten) Boston. She began writing in first grade by dictating poems to her mother. Her father taught printing at a local high school and published his daughter's early works. As a child, she enjoyed reading Dr. Seuss and Langston Hughes.

Weatherford earned a Bachelor of Arts from American University in 1977, a Master of Arts publication design from the University of Baltimore in 1982, and a Master of Fine Arts from the University of North Carolina at Greensboro.

== Career ==
Boston Weatherford has held many positions before beginning her writing career, including as an English teacher (1978); a field representative for the American Red Cross (1978–79); creator, producer, and host of the Black Arts Review radio show (1979); Art Litho Co. account executive (1981); National Bar Association communications director (1981–85); B & C Associates, Inc. vice president and creative director (1985–88).

Weatherford published her first picture book, Juneteenth Jamboree, with Lee & Low Books in 1995; the book discusses a summer celebration in memory of the Texas Emancipation. She then wrote a series of board books for preschoolers. In 1998, she co-authored Somebody's Knocking at Your Door: AIDS and the African American Church, and then published a collection of poetry, The Tar Baby on the Soapbox. After establishing herself as a versatile writer for both children and adults, she published two nonfiction chapter books before penning her first award-winning children's book, The Sound That Jazz Makes (2001), a poem that traces the history of African-American music. The book won the 2001 Carter G. Woodson Book Award.

Since then, she has continued to write poetry, historical fiction, and nonfiction biographical works for children. She said in a 2008 interview that one of the most important poems she has written was Moses: When Harriet Tubman Led Her People to Freedom: "Those inspired words came together with Kadir Nelson's soulful paintings and Ellice Lee's brilliant art direction in a perfect publishing storm. Moses propelled my career to another level." Moses has won a Caldecott Award for illustration, as well as an NAACP Image Award for Outstanding Literary Work – Children.

In 2008, Weatherford published her first poetic novel for young adults, Becoming Billie Holiday, about the development of the artist who she refers to as her muse.

Her book Unspeakable: The Tulsa Race Massacre, illustrated by Floyd Cooper and published by Carolrhoda Books, won both the Coretta Scott King Illustrator & Author awards in 2022. The novel was also a finalist for the Caldecott Medal and the Robert F. Sibert Informational Book Award.

In 2025, Weatherford won the Children's Literature Legacy Award for her substantial and lasting contributions to children's literature.

As an author, Weatherford acknowledges her calling "to mine the past for family stories, fading traditions and forgotten struggles." The books she writes, in poetry and prose, explore African-American history from a children's perspective and relate the past to new generations. Her works are often inspired by true events, many of which took place in the areas where she has lived. In her Author's Notes for each book, she includes a portion of the historical research from which her fiction or poetry emerged. In describing her purpose for writing to School Library Journal, in a 2008 interview: "I want the books that I write that are set during the Jim Crow era and the Civil Rights era to nudge today's kids toward justice. We've gone a long way, but we still have a long way to go."

Weatherford eventually became a writer-in-residence at Fayetteville State University. In 2007, she received the position of associate professor teaching composition and children's literature.

== Critical articles ==
Weatherford has written multiple articles attacking what she identifies as stereotyped caricatures of black people in East Asian popular culture, with two of the more prominent ones being geared toward anime, and another aimed at the name of a toothpaste brand.

=== Pokémon ===
In January 2000, Weatherford wrote an op-ed piece that ran in newspapers across Alabama. "Politically Incorrect Pokémon" explained how she believed that Pokémon #124, Jynx, was a negative stereotype of African Americans:

The character Jynx, Pokémon #124, has decidedly human features [in contrast to most other characters]: jet-black skin, huge pink lips, gaping eyes, a straight blonde mane and a full figure, complete with cleavage and wiggly hips. Put another way, Jynx resembles an overweight drag queen incarnation of Little Black Sambo, a stereotype from a children's book long ago purged from libraries.

In response to the controversy, Jynx's in-game sprites were given a purple skin color in the American versions of Pokémon Gold and Silver, released in late 2000. By 2002, Nintendo officially redesigned Jynx, changing its skin color from black to purple; this change was not reflected in the animated series until Jynx's purple skin appearance debuted in the episode "Mean With Envy!" (混戦、混乱！ポケモンコンテスト・キナギ大会！ （前編）), which originally aired in 2005, with the Amazon Prime release of "Holiday Hi-Jynx" recoloring Jynx accordingly, although it is still black on the thumbnail.

=== Dragon Ball ===
In an article published in The Christian Science Monitor in May 2000, Weatherford reiterated and expanded on her argument. Jynx had looked like "an obese drag queen" and she also offered Mr. Popo, a character from the Dragon Ball franchise, up for critique:

Mr. Popo is a rotund, turban-clad genie with pointy ears, jet-black skin, shiny white eyes and, yes, big red lips.

The Dragon Ball manga later released by Viz in 2003 had reduced the size of Mr. Popo's lips. Furthermore, media related to the series' sequel Dragon Ball Super showed an increase of black characters that strayed away from racist stereotypes, such as that of Goten and Trunks' classmates Rulah and Chok, and fewer references made to Mr. Popo (with the latest release Dragon Ball Super: Super Hero only indicating the character being off-screen).

== Selected awards and honors ==
Sixteen of Weatherford's books are Junior Library Guild selections: Before John Was a Jazz Giant (2008), Freedom in Congo Square (2016), Voice of Freedom (2016), In Your Hands (2017), Schomburg (2017), How Sweet the Sound (2018), The Roots of Rap (2019), Beauty Mark (2020), Box: Henry Brown Mails Himself to Freedom (2020), By and By (2020), Unspeakable (2021), Call Me Miss Hamilton (2022), How Do You Spell Unfair? (2023), Kin (2023), Bros (2024), and Outspoken (2024).

=== Awards ===
| Year | Title | Award | Result | Ref. |
|---|---|---|---|---|
| 2001 | The Sound that Jazz Makes | Carter G. Woodson Book Award (Elementary Level) | Won | |
| 2001 | The Sound that Jazz Makes | NAACP Image Award for Outstanding Literary Work – Children | Finalist | |
| 2002 | Remember the Bridge | North Carolina AAUW Award for Juvenile Literature | Won | |
| 2005 | Freedom on the Menu | North Carolina AAUW Award for Juvenile Literature | Won | |
| 2006 | Dear Mr. Rosenwald | Golden Kite Honor Award for Picture Book Text | ? | |
| 2007 | Dear Mr. Rosenwald | NAACP Image Award for Outstanding Literary Work – Children | Finalist | |
| 2007 | Moses | Caldecott Medal | Honor | |
| 2007 | Moses | NAACP Image Award for Outstanding Literary Work – Children | Won | |
| 2008 | Birmingham, 1963 | Jane Addams Children's Book Award for Book for Older Children | Honor | |
| 2008 | Birmingham, 1963 | Lee Bennett Hopkins Poetry Award | Won | |
| 2008 | Birmingham, 1963 | Jefferson Cup Award | Won | |
| 2009 | Becoming Billie Holiday | Coretta Scott King Award for Author | Honor | |
| 2009 | Before John Was a Jazz Giant | Golden Kite Award for Picture Book Text | Honor | |
| 2016 | Gordon Parks | NAACP Image Award for Outstanding Literary Work – Children | Won | |
| 2016 | Voice of Freedom | Boston Globe–Horn Book Award for Non-fiction | Honor | |
| 2016 | Voice of Freedom | Caldecott Medal | Honor | |
| 2016 | Voice of Freedom | Sibert Medal | Honor | |
| 2017 | Freedom in Congo Square | Caldecott Medal | Honor | |
| 2017 | Freedom in Congo Square | Charlotte Zolotow Award | Won | |
| 2017 | Voice of Freedom | Audie Award for Young Listeners' Title | Finalist | |
| 2018 | Schomburg | AAUW NC Award for Young People's Literature | Won | |
| 2018 | Schomburg | Carter G. Woodson Book Award (Middle Level) | Honor | |
| 2018 | Schomburg | Golden Kite Award for Non-Fiction for Younger Readers | Won | |
| 2018 | Schomburg | Jefferson Cup Award | Honor | |
| 2018 | Schomburg | Walter Dean Myers Award for Young Readers | Won | |
| 2018 | Schomburg | YALSA Award for Excellence in Nonfiction | Nominated | |
| 2021 | Box: Henry Brown Mails Himself to Freedom | Newbery Medal | Honor | |
| 2021 | Unspeakable | Boston Globe–Horn Book Award for Nonfiction | Honor | |
| 2021 | Unspeakable | Kirkus Prize for Picture Books | Finalist | |
| 2021 | Unspeakable | National Book Award for Young People's Literature | Longlisted | |
| 2022 | Unspeakable | Caldecott Medal | Honor | |
| 2022 | Unspeakable | Carter G. Woodson Book Award (Middle Level) | Won | |
| 2022 | Unspeakable | Coretta Scott King Award for Author and Illustrator | Won | |
| 2022 | Unspeakable | Kids' Book Choice Award for Book of the Year: 3rd to 5th Grade | Won | |
| 2022 | Unspeakable | Sibert Medal | Won | |
| 2023 | Me and the Family Tree | Margaret Wise Brown Board Book Award for 18–36 months | Won | |
| 2023 | A Song for the Unsung | Lambda Literary Award for Children's Literature | Finalist | |
| 2023 | Standing in the Need of Prayer | Boston Globe–Horn Book Award for Picture Book | Honor | |
| 2024 | How Do You Spell Unfair? | Coretta Scott King Award for Author | Honor | |
| 2024 | How Do You Spell Unfair? | Jane Addams Children's Book Award | Finalist | |
| 2024 | A Song for the Unsung | Jane Addams Children's Book Award | Finalist | |
| 2024 | Kin: Rooted in Hope | Claudia Lewis Award for Poetry (Older Readers) from Children's Book Committee of Bank Street College of Education | Won | |

=== Selected best "of" lists ===
"Best of" Lists for Weatherford's Books
| Title | Year | Organization | List | Ref. |
|---|---|---|---|---|
| All Rise | 2024 | Children's Book Committee of Bank Street College of Education | Best Children's Books of the Year (5–9) | (Note: Bank Street College of Education marked All Rise, The Faith of Elijah Cummings, Freedom in Congo Square, How Do You Spell Unfair?, Leontyne Price, Me and My Mama, and Me and the Family Tree as books of "Outstanding Merit".) |
| Box: Henry Brown Mails Himself to Freedom | 2020 | Kirkus Reviews | Best Picture Books of the Year | |
| Dreams for a Daughter | 2022 | Children's Book Committee of Bank Street College of Education | Best Children's Books of the Year (5–9) | |
| The Faith of Elijah Cummings | 2022 | Kirkus Reviews | Best Picture Books of the Year | |
| The Faith of Elijah Cummings | 2023 | Children's Book Committee of Bank Street College of Education | Best Children's Books of the Year (5–9) | |
| Freedom in Congo Square | 2016 | Booklist | Booklist Editors' Choice: Books for Youth | |
| Freedom in Congo Square | 2016 | Booklist | Top 10 Multicultural Nonfiction for Youth | |
| Freedom in Congo Square | 2016 | The Horn Book Magazine | Fanfare for Picture Book | |
| Freedom in Congo Square | 2016 | The New York Times Book Review | Best Illustrated Children's Books of the Year | |
| Freedom in Congo Square | 2017 | Children's Book Committee of Bank Street College of Education | Best Children's Books of the Year (5–9) | |
| Freedom in Congo Square | 2017 | Capitol Choices | Noteworthy Books for Children (7–10) | |
| Freedom in Congo Square | 2017 | International Literacy Association (CL/R SIG) | Notable Books for a Global Society | |
| Freedom on the Menu | 2005 | Children's Book Committee of Bank Street College of Education | Best Children's Books | |
| Gordon Parks | 2016 | Capitol Choices | Noteworthy Books for Children (Up to 7) | |
| Grandma and Me | 2020 | Children's Book Committee of Bank Street College of Education | Best Children's Books of the Year (Under Five) | |
| How Do You Spell Unfair? | 2023 | Booklist | Booklist Editors' Choice: Books for Youth | |
| How Do You Spell Unfair? | 2023 | Kirkus Reviews | Best Pictures Books of the Year | |
| How Do You Spell Unfair? | 2024 | Association for Library Service to Children | Notable Children's Books | |
| How Do You Spell Unfair? | 2024 | Children's Book Committee of Bank Street College of Education | Best Children's Books of the Year (5–9) | |
| How Do You Spell Unfair? | 2024 | Booklist | Top 10 History Books for Youth | |
| How Do You Spell Unfair? | 2024 | International Literacy Association (CL/R SIG) | Notable Books for a Global Society | |
| How Sweet the Sound | 2018 | Booklist | Top 10 Religion & Spirituality for Youth | |
| In Your Hands | 2017 | Booklist | Top 10 Religion & Spirituality Books for Youth | |
| In Your Hands | 2017 | Kirkus Reviews | Best Picture Books of the Year | |
| In Your Hands | 2018 | Booklist | Top 10 Diverse Picture Books | |
| Kin: Rooted in Hope | 2023 | Shelf Awareness | Best Middle Grade Books of the Year | |
| The Legendary Miss Lena Horne | 2017 | Booklist | Top 10 Biographies for Youth | |
| The Legendary Miss Lena Horne | 2018 | Capitol Choices | Noteworthy Books for Children (7–10) | |
| Leontyne Price | 2015 | Children's Book Committee of Bank Street College of Education | Best Children's Books of the Year (5–9) | |
| Leontyne Price | 2015 | Booklist | Top 10 Arts Books for Yout | |
| Madam Speaker | 2022 | Children's Book Committee of Bank Street College of Education | Best Children's Books of the Year (5–9) | |
| Me and My Mama | 2020 | Children's Book Committee of Bank Street College of Education | Best Children's Books of the Year (Under Five) | |
| Me and the Family Tree | 2020 | Children's Book Committee of Bank Street College of Education | Best Children's Books of the Year (Under Five) | |
| Moses | 2006 | The Horn Book Magazine | Fanfare for Nonfiction | |
| A Negro League Scrapbook | 2006 | International Literacy Association (CL/R SIG) | Notable Books for a Global Society | |
| RESPECT | 2020 | Booklist | Top 10 Arts Books for Youth | |
| The Roots of Rap | 2019 | Booklist | Top 10 Arts Books for Youth | |
| The Roots of Rap | 2019 | Chicago Public Library | Best Informational Books for Younger Readers | |
| The Roots of Rap | 2019 | Kirkus Reviews | Best Picture Books of the Year | |
| The Roots of Rap | 2019 | New York Public Library | Best Books for Kids | |
| Schomburg | 2017 | Shelf Awareness | Best Picture Books of the Year | |
| Schomburg | 2017 | Kirkus Reviews | Best Picture Books of the Year | |
| Schomburg | 2018 | Booklist | Top 10 Biographies for Youth | |
| Schomburg | 2018 | Booklist | Top 10 Diverse Nonfiction for Older and Middle Readers | |
| Schomburg | 2018 | Capitol Choices | Noteworthy Books for Children (7–10) | |
| A Song for the Unsong | 2023 | American Library Association | Rainbow Book List | |
| Standing in the Need of Prayer | 2022 | The Horn Book Magazine | Fanfare for Poetry | |
| Standing in the Need of Prayer | 2022 | Kirkus Reviews | Best Picture Books of the Year | |
| Standing in the Need of Prayer | 2023 | Association for Library Service to Children | Notable Children's Books | |
| Standing in the Need of Prayer | 2023 | Children's Book Committee of Bank Street College of Education | Best Children's Books of the Year (5–9) | |
| Unspeakable | 2021 | Booklist | Booklist Editors' Choice: Books for Youth | |
| Unspeakable | 2021 | CPL | Best Informational Books for Older Readers | |
| Unspeakable | 2021 | The Horn Book Magazine | Fanfare for Nonfiction | |
| Unspeakable | 2021 | Kirkus Reviews | Best Picture Books of the Year | |
| Unspeakable | 2021 | The New York Times Book Review | Best Illustrated Children's Books | |
| Unspeakable | 2021 | New York Public Library | Best Books for Kids | |
| Unspeakable | 2021 | NPR | Books We Love | |
| Unspeakable | 2022 | Association for Library Service to Children | Notable Children's Books | |
| Unspeakable | 2022 | Booklist | Top 10 History for Youth | |
| Unspeakable | 2022 | Capitol Choices | Noteworthy Books for Children (7–10) | |
| Unspeakable | 2022 | International Literacy Association (CL/R SIG) | Notable Books for a Global Society | |
| Voice of Freedom | 2015 | Booklist | Booklist Editors' Choice: Books for Youth | |
| Voice of Freedom | 2015 | The Horn Book Magazine | Fanfare for Nonfiction | |
| Voice of Freedom | 2016 | American Library Association | Amelia Bloomer List | |
| Voice of Freedom | 2016 | Association for Library Service to Children | Notable Children's Books | |
| Voice of Freedom | 2016 | Booklist | Top 10 Biographies for Youth | |
| You Can Fly | 2017 | Association for Library Service to Children | Notable Children's Books | |

== Personal life ==
On February 2, 1985, Boston married writer Ronald Jeffrey Weatherford. She has two children.

== Publications ==
=== 1990s ===
- Juneteenth Jamboree. Illustrated by Yvonne Buchanan. Lee & Low Books. 1995. ISBN 1-60060-248-7.
- Grandma and Me. Illustrated by Michelle Mills. Writers & Readers Publishing. 1997. ISBN 0-86316-252-5.
  - Grandma and Me. Illustrated by Ashleigh Corrin (2nd ed.). Sourcebooks Jabberwocky. 2023. ISBN 978-1-7282-4243-9.
- Me & the Family Tree. Illustrated by Michelle Mills. Writers & Readers Publishing. 1997. ISBN 0-86316-251-7.
  - Me and the Family Tree (2nd ed.). Sourcebooks Jabberwocky. 2022. ISBN 978-1-72-824250-7.
- Mighty Menfolk. Illustrated by Michelle Mills. Writers & Readers Publishing. 1997. ISBN 0-86316-253-3.
- My Favorite Toy. Illustrated by Michelle Mills. Writers & Readers Publishing. 1997. ISBN 0-86316-215-0.
- Somebody's Knocking at Your Door: AIDS and the African-American Church, with Ronald J. Weatherford (Author) and Harold G. Koenig (Author), 1998, Routledge, ISBN 0-7890-0575-1
- The Tar Baby on the Soapbox, 1999, Methodist College, ISBN 0-9670994-3-9
- Sink or Swim: African-American Lifesavers of the Outer Banks, 1999, Coastal Carolina Press, ISBN 1-928556-03-5

=== 2000s ===
- The African-American Struggle for Legal Equality, 2000, Enslow Publishers, ISBN 0-7660-1415-0
- The Sound that Jazz Makes. Illustrated by Eric Velasquez. Walker Books. 2001. ISBN 0-8027-7674-4.
- Sidewalk Chalk: Poems of the City. Illustrated by Dimitrea Tokunbo. Wordsong. 2001. ISBN 978-1-56397-084-9.
- Princeville: The 500-Year Flood, 2001, Coastal Carolina Press, ISBN 1-928556-32-9
- Remember the Bridge: Poems of a People. Philomel Books. 2002. ISBN 0-399-23726-7.
- Jazz Baby, with Laura Freeman (illustrator), 2002, Lee & Low Books, ISBN 1-58430-039-6
- Stormy Blues, 2002, Xavier Review Press, ISBN 1-883275-11-3
- Great African-American Lawyers: Raising the Bar of Freedom, 2003, Enslow Publishers, ISBN 0-7660-1837-7
- Freedom on the Menu: The Greensboro Sit-Ins. Illustrated by Jerome Lagarrigue. Dial Books for Young Readers. 2005. ISBN 0-8037-2860-3.
- A Negro League Scrapbook, 2005, Boyds Mills Press, ISBN 1-59078-091-4
- The Carolina Parakeet: America's Lost Parrot in Art and Memory, 2005, Avian Publications, ISBN 0-910335-01-X
- Champions on the Bench: The Cannon Street YMCA All-Stars. Illustrated by Leonard Jenkins. Dial Press. 2006. ISBN 978-0-8037-2987-2.
- Moses: When Harriet Tubman Led Her People to Freedom. Illustrated by Kadir Nelson. Jump at the Sun/Hyperion. 2006. ISBN 0-7868-5175-9.
- Dear Mr. Rosenwald. Illustrated by R. Gregory Christie. Scholastic Press. 2006. ISBN 0-439-49522-9.
- Before John Was a Jazz Giant: A Song of John Coltrane. Illustrated by Sean Qualls. Henry Holt. 2007. ISBN 978-0-8050-7994-4.
- Celebremos Juneteenth, with Yvonne Buchanan (illustrator), 2007, Lee & Low Books, ISBN 1-60060-247-9
- Birmingham, 1963. Illustrated by Boyds Mills. Wordsong. 2007. ISBN 978-1-59078-440-2.
- Jesse Owens: Fastest Man Alive. Illustrated by Eric Velasquez. Walker Books. 2007. ISBN 978-0-8027-9550-2.
- I, Matthew Henson: Polar Explorer. Illustrated by Eric Velasquez. Walker Books. 2007. ISBN 978-0-8027-9688-2.
- The Library Ghost. Illustrated by Lee White. Upstart Books. 2008. ISBN 978-1-60213-017-3.
- Becoming Billie Holiday. Illustrated by Floyd Cooper. Wordsong. 2008. ISBN 978-1-59078-507-2.
- Racing Against the Odds: Wendell Scott, African American Stock Car Champion. Illustrated by Eric Velásquez. Marshall Cavendish Children's Books. 2009. ISBN 978-0-7614-5465-6.
- First Pooch: The Obamas Pick a Pet. Illustrated by Amy Bates. Two Lions. 2009. ISBN 978-0-76-145636-0.

=== 2010s ===
- The Beatitudes: From Slavery to Civil Rights. Illustrated by Tim Ladwig. Marshall Cavendish. 2010. ISBN 978-1-46-743277-1.
- Michelle Obama: First Mom. Illustrated by Robert Barrett. Marshall Cavendish. 2010. ISBN 978-0-76-145640-7.
- Obama: Only in America. Illustrated by Robert Barrett. Marshall Cavendish. 2010. ISBN 978-0-76-145641-4.
- Oprah: The Little Speaker. Illustrated by London Ladd. Marshall Cavendish. 2010. ISBN 978-0-7614-5632-2.
- Leontyne Price: Voice of a Century. Knopf Books for Young Readers. 2014. ISBN 978-0-37-585606-8.
- Sugar Hill: Harlem's Historic Neighborhood. Illustrated by R. Gregory Christie. Albert Whitman. 2014. ISBN 978-0-8075-7650-2.
- Voice of Freedom: Fannie Lou Hamer, Spirit of the Civil Rights Movement. Illustrated by Ekua Holmes. Candlewick. 2015. ISBN 978-0-7636-6531-9.
- Gordon Parks: How the Photographer Captured Black and White America. Illustrated by Jamey Christoph. Whitman, Albert & Company. 2015. ISBN 978-0-80-753017-7.
- Freedom in Congo Square. Illustrated by R. Gregory Christie. little bee books. 2016. ISBN 978-1-49-980103-3.
- Dorothea Lange: The Photographer Who Found the Faces of the Depression. Illustrated by Sarah Green. Albert Whitman. 2017. ISBN 978-0-8075-1699-7.
- In Your Hands, with Brian Pinkney. Illustrated by Brian Pinkney. Atheneum Books for Young Readers. 2017. ISBN 978-1-48-146293-8.
- The Legendary Miss Lena Horne. Illustrated by Elizabeth Zunon. Atheneum Books for Young Readers. 2017. ISBN 978-1-48-146824-4.
- Schomburg: The Man Who Built a Library. Illustrated by Eric Velasquez. Candlewick Press. 2017. ISBN 978-1-53-620897-9.
- You Can Fly: The Tuskegee Airmen. Illustrated by Jeffrey Boston Weatherford. Atheneum Books for Young Readers. 2018. ISBN 978-1-48-144939-7.
- How Sweet the Sound: The Story of Amazing Grace. Illustrated by Frank Morrison. Atheneum Books for Young Readers. 2018. ISBN 978-1-48-147206-7.
- Be a King: Dr. Martin Luther King Jr.'s Dream and You. Illustrated by James E. Ransome. Bloomsbury USA (Children). 2018. ISBN 978-0-80-272368-0.
- The Roots of Rap: 16 Bars on the 4 Pillars of Hip-Hop. Illustrated by Frank Morrison. little bee books. 2018. ISBN 978-1499804119.

=== 2020s ===
- Beauty Mark: A Verse Novel of Marilyn Monroe. Candlewick Press. 2020. ISBN 978-1-53-620629-6.
- Box: Henry Brown Mails Himself to Freedom. Illustrated by Michele Wood. Candlewick. 2020. ISBN 978-0763691561.
- By and By: Charles Albert Tindley, the Father of Gospel Music. Illustrated by Bryan Collier. Atheneum. 2020. ISBN 978-1-5344-2636-8.
- Respect: Aretha Franklin, the Queen of Soul. Illustrated by Frank Morrison. Atheneum. 2020. ISBN 978-1-5344-5228-2.
- Dreams for a Daughter. Illustrated by Brian Pinkney. Atheneum. 2021. ISBN 978-1-5344-5198-8.
- Madame Speaker: Nancy Pelosi Calls the House to Order. Illustrated by Chris Hsu. Little Bee. 2021. ISBN 978-1-4998-1189-6.
- Unspeakable: The Tulsa Race Massacre. Illustrated by Floyd Cooper. Carolrhoda Books. 2021. ISBN 978-1-54-158120-3.
- Call Me Miss Hamilton: One Woman's Case for Equality and Respect. Millbrook Press. 2022. ISBN 978-1-54-156040-6.
- The Faith of Elijah Cummings: The North Star of Equal Justice. Illustrated by Laura Freeman. Random House Studio. 2022. ISBN 978-0-593-30650-5.
- Me and My Mama. Illustrated by Ashleigh Corrin. Sourcebooks Jabberwocky. 2022. ISBN 978-1-72-824246-0.
- A Song for the Unsung: Bayard Rustin, the Man Behind the 1963 March on Washington. Illustrated by Byron McCray. Henry Holt and Co. 2022. ISBN 978-1-25-077950-2.
- Standing in the Need of Prayer: A Modern Retelling of the Classic Spiritual. Illustrated by Frank Morrison. Crown Books for Young Readers. 2022. ISBN 978-0-59-330634-5.
- All Rise: The Story of Ketanji Brown Jackson. Illustrated by Ashley Evans. Crown Books for Young Readers. 2023. ISBN 978-059-365016-5.
- How Do You Spell Unfair? MacNolia Cox and the National Spelling Bee. Illustrated by Frank Morrison. Candlewick. 2023. ISBN 978-1-536-21554-0.
- Kin: Rooted in Hope. Illustrated by Jeffery Boston Weatherford. Atheneum Books for Young Readers. 2023. ISBN 978-1-66-591362-1.
- Sugar Pie Lullaby: The Soul of Motown in a Song of Love. Illustrated by Sawyer Cloud. Sourcebooks Explore. 2023. ISBN 978-1-72-824253-8.
- You Are My Pride: A Love Letter from Your Motherland. Illustrated by E.B. Lewis. Astra Young Readers. 2023. ISBN 978-1-63-592387-2.
- Bros. Illustrated by Reggie Brown. Candlewick Press. 2024. ISBN 978-1-53-622041-4.
- A Crown of Stories: The Life and Language of Beloved Writer Toni Morrison. Illustrated by Khalif Tahir Johnson. Quill Tree. 2024. ISBN 978-0-06-291103-2.
- Outspoken: Paul Robeson, Ahead of His Time: A One-Man Show. Illustrated by Eric Velasquez. Candlewick Press. 2024. ISBN 978-1-5362-1297-6.
