= NAACP Image Award for Outstanding Literary Work – Children =

Children's literature award from the NAACP

This article lists the winners and nominees for the NAACP Image Award for Outstanding Literary Work in the children's literature category.

== Winners and finalists ==
=== 1990s ===
Award winners and finalists, 1996, 1999
Year	Book	Author	Illustrator	Result	Ref.
1996	Her Stories: African American Folktales, Fairy Tales and True Tales	Virginia Hamilton	Leo and Diane Dillon	Winner	
1999	Let My People Go: Bible Stories Told by a Freeman of Color	Patricia McKissack and Fredrick L. McKissack Jr.	James E. Ransome	Winner	

=== 2000s ===
Award winners and finalists, 2000-2009
Year	Book	Author	Illustrator	Result	Ref.
2000	If a Bus Could Talk: The Story of Rosa Parks	Faith Ringgold		Winner	
2000	God Inside of Me	Della Reese	Vyonne Buchanan	Finalist	
2000	Happy to Be Nappy	bell hooks	Christopher Raschka	Finalist	
2000	The Day I Was Rich	Bill Cosby	Varnette P. Honeywood	Finalist	
2000	Through My Eyes	Ruby Bridges		Finalist	
2001	Shades of Black: A Celebration of Our Children	Sandra Pinkney	Myles C. Pinkney (photos)	Winner	
2001	Dancing in the Wings	Debbie Allen	Kadir Nelson	Finalist	
2001	Nikki Giovanni: Poet of the People	Judith Pinkerton Josephson		Finalist	
2001	Teens Can Make It Happen	Stedman Graham		Finalist	
2001	The Sound That Jazz Makes	Carole Boston Weatherford	Eric Velásquez	Finalist	
2002	Just the Two of Us	Will Smith	Kadir Nelson	Winner	
2003	Nelson Mandela's Favorite African Folktales	Nelson Mandela		Winner	
2004	My Brother Martin: A Sister Remembers Growing Up with the Rev. Dr. Martin Luther King, Jr.	Christine King Farris	Chris K. Soentpiet	Winner	
2004	The Montgomery Bus Boycott (Events that Shaped America)	Sabrina Crewe and Frank Walsh		Finalist	
2004	God Created	Mark Bozzuti-Jones	Jui Ishida	Finalist	
2004	Li'l Dan, the Drummer Boy: A Civil War Story	Romare Bearden		Finalist	
2004	Who's Got Game? The Ant or the Grasshopper?	Toni and Slade Morrison	Pascal Lemaître	Finalist	
2005	The 1963 Civil Rights March	Sabrina Crewe		Winner	
2005	African Princess: The Amazing Lives of Africa's Royal Women	Joyce Hanson	Laurie McGaw	Finalist	
2005	Ellington Was Not a Street	Ntozake Shange	Kadir Nelson	Finalist	
2005	Langston's Train Ride	Robert Burleigh	Leonard Jenkins	Finalist	
2005	Maya's World: Angelina of Italy	Maya Angelou	Lizzy Rockwell	Finalist	
2006	Girls Hold Up This World	Jada Pinkett Smith	Donyell Kennedy-Mccullough (photos)	Winner	
2006	I Can Make a Difference	Marian Wright Edelman	Barry Moser	Finalist	
2006	The School Is Not White! A True Story of the Civil Rights Movement	Doreen Rappaport	Curtis James	Finalist	
2006	Honey Baby Sugar Child	Alice Faye Duncan	Susan Keeter	Finalist	
2006	Please, Puppy, Please	Spike Lee and Tonya Lewis Lee	Kadir Nelson	Finalist	
2007	Moses: When Harriet Tubman Led Her People to Freedom	Carole Boston Weatherford	Kadir Nelson	Winner	
2007	Dear Mr. Rosenwald	Carole Boston Weatherford	R. Gregory Christie	Finalist	
2007	I Like You But I Love Me	Common	Lorraine West	Finalist	
2007	Nobody Gonna Turn Me 'Round	Doreen Rappaport	Shane W. Evans	Finalist	
2007	Whoopi's Big Book of Manners	Whoopi Goldberg	Olo	Finalist	
2008	Nothing but Trouble: The Story of Althea Gibson	Sue Stauffacher	Greg Couch	Winner	
2008	Friendship for Today	Patricia McKissack		Finalist	
2008	Elijah of Buxton	Christopher Paul Curtis		Finalist	
2008	Let It Shine	Ashley Bryan		Finalist	
2008	Young Pele	Lesa Cline-Ransome	James E. Ransome	Finalist	
2009	Barack Obama: Son of Promise, Child of Hope	Nikki Grimes	Bryan Collier	Winner	
2009	Amazing Peace: A Christmas Poem	Maya Angelou		Finalist	
2009	Say a Little Prayer	Dionne Warwick, David Freeman Wooley, and Tonya Bolden		Finalist	
2009	We Are the Ship: The Story of Negro League Baseball	Kadir Nelson		Finalist	
2009	You Can Do It!	Tony Dungy	Amy June Bates	Finalist	

=== 2010s ===
Award winners and finalists, 2010-2019
Year	Book	Author	Illustrator	Result	Ref.
2010	Our Children Can Soar	Michelle Cook		Winner	
2010	The Negro Speaks of Rivers	Langston Hughes	E. B. Lewis	Finalist	
2010	Peeny Butter Fudge	Toni and Slade Morrison	Joe Cepeda	Finalist	
2010	Sugar Plum Ballerinas: Toeshoe Trouble	Whoopi Goldberg	Maryn Roos	Finalist	
2010	Child of the Civil Rights Movement	Paula Young Shelton and Raul Colon		Finalist	
2011	My Brother Charlie	Holly Robinson Peete and Ryan Elizabeth Peete	Shane Evans	Winner	
2011	Grandma’s Gift	Eric Velásquez	Eric Velásquez	Finalist	
2011	Mama Miti: Wangai Maathai and the Tree of Kenya	Donna Jo Napoli	Kadir Nelson	Finalist	
2011	Side by Side/Lado a Lado: The Story of Delores Huerta and Cesar Chavez	Monica Brown	Joe Cepeda	Finalist	
2011	The Great Migration: Journey to the North	Eloise Greenfield	Jan Spivey Gilchrist	Finalist	
2012	You Can Be a Friend	Tony and Lauren Dungy		Winner	
2012	Acoustic Rooster and His Barnyard Band	Kwame Alexander	Tim Bowers	Finalist	
2012	Before There Was Mozart	Lesa Cline-Ransome	James E. Ransome	Finalist	
2012	Heart and Soul	Kadir Nelson		Finalist	
2012	White Water	Michael S. Bandy and Eric Stein	Shadra Strickland	Finalist	
2013	What Color is My World	Kareem Abdul-Jabbar, with Raymond Obstfeld	A. G. Ford and Ben Boos	Winner	
2013	Fifty Cents and a Dream	Jabari Asim	Bryan Collier	Finalist	
2013	Harlem's Little Blackbird: The Story of Florence Mills	Renée Watson	Christian Robinson	Finalist	
2013	In the Land of Milk and Honey	Joyce Carol Thomas	Floyd Cooper	Finalist	
2013	Indigo Blume and the Garden City	Kwame Alexander	JahSun Mitchell	Finalist	
2014	Nelson Mandela	Kadir Nelson		Winner	
2014	I'm A Pretty Little Black Girl!	Betty K. Bynum	Claire Armstrong Parod	Finalist	
2014	Knock Knock: My Dad's Dream for Me	Daniel Beaty	Bryan Collier	Finalist	
2014	Martin & Mahalia: His Words, Her Song	Andrea Davis Pinkney	Brian Pinkney	Finalist	
2014	You Never Heard of Willie Mays?!	Jonah Winter	Terry Widener	Finalist	
2015	Dork Diaries: Tales from a Not-So-Happily Ever After	Rachel Renée Russell		Winner	
2015	Beautiful Moon: A Child's Prayer	Tonya Bolden	Eric Velásquez	Finalist	
2015	Little Melba and Her Big Trombone	Katheryn Russell-Brown	Frank Morrison	Finalist	
2015	Malcolm Little: The Boy Who Grew Up To Become Malcolm X	Ilyasah Shabazz	A. G. Ford	Finalist	
2015	Searching for Sarah Rector	Tonya Bolden		Finalist	
2016	Gordon Parks: How the Photographer Captured Black and White America	Carole Boston Weatherford	Jamey Christoph	Winner	
2016	Chasing Freedom: The Life Journeys of Harriet Tubman and Susan B. Anthony, Inspired by Historical Facts	Nikki Grimes	Michele Wood	Finalist	
2016	Granddaddy’s Turn: A Journey to the Ballot Box	Michael S. Bandy and Eric Stein	James E. Ransome	Finalist	
2016	If You Plant a Seed	Kadir Nelson		Finalist	
2016	New Shoes	Susan Lynn Meyer	Eric Velásquez	Finalist	
2017	Tiny Stitches: The Life of Medical Pioneer Vivien Thomas	Gwendolyn Hooks	Colin Bootman	Winner	
2017	A Poem for Peter: The Story of Ezra Jack Keats and the Creation of the Snowy Day	Andrea Davis Pinkney	Steve Johnson and Lou Fancher	Finalist	
2017	Daddy’s Little Girl	Karissa Culbreath		Finalist	
2017	Radiant Child: The Story of Young Artist Jean-Michel Basquiat	Javaka Steptoe		Finalist	
2017	The Golden Girls of Rio	Nikkolas Smith	Nikkolas Smith	Finalist	
2018	Little Leaders: Bold Women in Black History	Vashti Harrison		Winner	
2018	Becoming Kareem: Growing Up On and Off the Court	Kareem Abdul-Jabbar, with Raymond Obstfeld		Finalist	
2018	Before She Was Harriet	Lesa Cline-Ransome	James E. Ransome	Finalist	
2018	Take a Picture of Me, James VanDerZee!	Andrea J. Loney	Keith Mallett	Finalist	
2018	The Youngest Marcher: The Story of Audrey Faye Hendricks, A Young Civil Rights Activist	Cynthia Levinson	Vanessa Brantley-Newton	Finalist	
2019	Hidden Figures: The True Story of Four Black Women and the Space Race	Margot Lee Shetterly	Laura Freeman	Winner	
2019	Facing Frederick: The Life of Frederick Douglass, A Monumental American Man	Tonya Bolden		Finalist	
2019	I Can Be Anything! Don’t Tell Me I Can't	Diane Dillon		Finalist	
2019	The 5 O'Clock Band	Troy "Trombone Shorty" Andrews	Bryan Collier	Finalist	
2019	The Word Collector	Peter H. Reynolds		Finalist	

=== 2020s ===
Award winners and finalists, 2020-present
Year	Book	Author	Illustrator	Result	Ref.
2020	Sulwe	Lupita Nyong'o	Vashti Harrison	Winner	
2020	A Place to Land: Martin Luther King Jr. and the Speech That Inspired a Nation	Barry Wittenstein	Jerry Pinkney	Finalist	
2020	Hair Love	Matthew A. Cherry	Vashti Harrison	Finalist	
2020	Parker Looks Up: An Extraordinary Moment	Parker Curry and Jessica Curry	Brittany Jackson	Finalist	
2020	Ruby Finds a Worry	Tom Percival		Finalist	
2021	She Was the First!: The Trailblazing Life of Shirley Chisholm	Katheryn Russell-Brown	Eric Velásquez	Winner	
2021	I Promise	LeBron James	Nina Mata	Finalist	
2021	Just Like a Mama	Alice Faye Duncan	Charnelle Pinkney Barlow	Finalist	
2021	Kamala Harris: Rooted in Justice	Nikki Grimes	Laura Freeman	Finalist	
2021	The Secret Garden of George Washington Carver	Gene Barretta	Frank Morrison	Finalist	
2022	Stacey’s Extraordinary Words	Stacey Abrams	Kitt Thomas	Winner	
2022	Black Ballerinas: My Journey to Our Legacy	Misty Copeland	Salena Barnes	Finalist	
2022	Change Sings	Amanda Gorman	Loren Long	Finalist	
2022	Time for Bed, Old House	Janet Costa Bates	A. G. Ford	Finalist	
2022	When Langston Dances	Kaija Langley	Keith Mallett	Finalist	
2023	Stacey’s Remarkable Books	Stacey Abrams	Kitt Thomas	Winner	
2023	Black Gold	Laura Obuobi	London Ladd	Finalist	
2023	Ablaze with Color: A Story of Painter Alma Thomas	Jeanne Walker Harvey	Loveis Wise	Finalist	
2023	The Year We Learned to Fly	Jacqueline Woodson	Rafael López	Finalist	
2023	Blue: A History of the Color as Deep as the Sea and as Wide as the Sky	Nana Ekua Brew-Hammond	Daniel Minter	Finalist	
2024	Crowned: Magical Folk and Fairy Tales from the Diaspora	Kahran and Regis Bethencourt	Rafael López	Winner	
2024	How Do You Spell Unfair?: MacNolia Cox and the National Spelling Bee	Carole Boston Weatherford	Frank Morrison	Finalist	
2024	I Absolutely, Positively Love My Spots	Lid’ya C. Rivera	Nina Mata	Finalist	
2024	Is This Love?	Cedella Marley	Alea Marley	Finalist	
2024	Like Lava In My Veins	Derrick Barnes	Shawn Martinbrough	Finalist	
2025	You Can Be a Good Friend (No Matter What!): A Lil TJ Book	Taraji P. Henson	Paul Kellam	Winner	
2025	All I Need to Be	Rachel Ricketts	Tiffany Rose	Finalist	
2025	Cicely Tyson	Renée Watson	Sherry Shine	Finalist	
2025	Crowning Glory: A Celebration of Black Hair	Carole Boston Weatherford	Ekua Holmes	Finalist	
2025	All I Need to Be	Maisha Oso	London Ladd	Finalist	
2026	Yvonne Clark and Her Engineering Spark	Allen R. Wells	DeAndraHodge	Winner	
2026	Black Boy, Rise	Brynne Barnes		Finalist	
2026	Black Diamond Kings: Heroes of Negro League Baseball	Charles R. Smith Jr.		Finalist	
2026	My Quiet Place	Monica Mikai		Finalist	
2026	The History of We	Nikkolas Smith		Finalist	

== Multiple wins and nominations ==
The following individuals received two or more Outstanding Literary Work, Children's Awards:

Wins	Author
2	Carole Boston Weatherford
2	Vashti Harrison

The following individuals received two or more Outstanding Literary Work, Children's nominations:

Nominations	Author
4	Kadir Nelson
4	Carole Boston Weatherford
3	Nikki Grimes
3	Vashti Harrison
2	Kwame Alexander
2	Maya Angelou
2	Michael S. Bandy
2	Tonya Bolden
2	Alice Faye Duncan
2	Tony Dungy
2	Whoopi Goldberg
2	Patricia McKissack
2	Andrea Davis Pinkney
2	Lesa Cline-Ransome
2	Doreen Rappaport
2	Katheryn Russell-Brown
