= Mama, I Want to Sing! =

Mama, I Want to Sing! may refer to:

- Mama, I Want to Sing! (musical), a 1983 off-Broadway musical
- Mama, I Want to Sing! (film), a 2012 musical film
