= Obstfeld =

Obstfeld is a surname. Notable people with the surname include:

- Maurice Obstfeld (born 1952), American economist
- Raymond Obstfeld (born 1952), American writer of poetry, non-fiction, fiction, and screenplays
