= Eric Velásquez =

American author and illustrator

- Born: New York City, United States
- Occupation: Illustrator
- Education: School of Visual Arts (BFA, 1983)
- Notable awards: John Steptoe New Talent Award (1999); Pura Belpré Award (2011); Walter Dean Myers Award (2018); NAACP Image Award (2021)

Website
- ericvelasquez.com

Eric A. Velásquez is an American author and illustrator of over 30 children's books. Among other honors, he has won a John Steptoe New Talent Award (2001), Pura Belpré Award (2011), and NAACP Image Award (2021).

== Biography ==
Velásquez was born in New York City, and grew up in Spanish Harlem. He is of Afro-Puerto Rican descent, and his first language was Spanish. He graduated from the High School of Art and Design, then in 1983 received a Bachelor of Arts from School of Visual Arts, after which he studied at the Art Students League of New York with Harvey Dinnerstein.

Before illustrating picture books, Velásquez designed book jackets and interior illustrations, including for Beverley Naidoo's Journey to Jo'burg (1986) and Chain of Fire (1990). His first illustrated picture book was Debbie Chocolate's The Piano Man (1998), which won him the 1999 John Steptoe New Talent Award for Illustrators. He debuted as an author in 2001 with Grandma's Records.

As of 2014, Velásquez lived in New York City and taught book illustration at the Fashion Institute of Technology.

== Awards and honors ==
The Association for Library Service to Children has named five of the books Velásquez has published as Notable Children's Books: Grandma's Gift (2011), Beautiful Moon (2015), Schomburg (2018), Ruth Objects (2021), and ¡Mambo Mucho Mambo! (2022). Three of the books Velásquez has illustrated have been included on Rise: A Feminist Book Project lists: Touch the Sky (2013), Ruth Objects (2021), (Note: Ruth Objects was considered a top ten book on the Rise book list.) and She Was The First! (2021).

Kirkus Reviews and Shelf Awareness included Schomburg on their list of the best picture books of 2017. The following year, Booklist included it on their lists of the "Top 10 Biographies for Youth" and "Top 10 Diverse Nonfiction for Older and Middle Readers". In 2021, Booklist included ¡Mambo Mucho Mambo! on their list of the "Top 10 Arts Books for Youth". The following year, they included Going Places on their "Booklist Editors' Choice: Books for Youth" list.

Awards for Velásquez's books
Year	Title	Award	Result	Ref.
1999	The Piano Man	John Steptoe New Talent Award	Won	
2001	The Sound That Jazz Makes	Carter G. Woodson Book Award (Elementary Level)	Won	
2001	The Sound That Jazz Makes	NAACP Image Award for Outstanding Literary Work – Children	Finalist	
2011	Grandma's Gift	Pura Belpré Award for Illustrator	Won	
2011	Grandma's Gift	NAACP Image Award for Outstanding Literary Work – Children	Finalist	
2015	Beautiful Moon	Charlotte Zolotow Award	Honor	
2015	Beautiful Moon	NAACP Image Award for Outstanding Literary Work – Children	Finalist	
2016	New Shoes	NAACP Image Award for Outstanding Literary Work – Children	Finalist	
2018	Schomburg	AAUW NC Award for Young People’s Literature	Won	
2018	Schomburg	Carter G. Woodson Book Award (Middle Level)	Honor	
2018	Schomburg	Golden Kite Award for Non-Fiction for Younger Readers	Won	
2018	Schomburg	Jefferson Cup Award	Honor	
2018	Schomburg	Walter Dean Myers Award for Younger Readers	Won	
2018	Schomburg	YALSA Award for Excellence in Nonfiction	Nominated	
2021	She Was the First!	NAACP Image Award for Outstanding Literary Work – Children	Won	

== Publications ==
=== As author/illustrator ===
- Grandma's Records. Walker Books. 2001. ISBN 978-0-8027-8760-6.
- Grandma's Gift. Walker Books. 2010. ISBN 978-0-802-72082-5.
- Looking for Bongo. Holiday House. 2016. ISBN 978-0-823-43565-4.
- Octopus Stew. Holiday House. 2019. ISBN 978-0-823-43754-2.
  - Pulpo Guisado. Holiday House. 2020. ISBN 978-0-823-44864-7.

=== As illustrator ===
- Tate, Eleanora E. (1992). Front Porch Stories at the One-Room School. Yearling Books. ISBN 978-0-553-08384-2.
- Soto, Gary (1997). Off and Running. Yearling Books. ISBN 978-0-440-41432-2.
- Chocolate, Debbie (1998). The Piano Man. Walker Books. ISBN 978-0-802-77578-8.
- Weatherford, Carole Boston (2001). The Sound that Jazz Makes. Walker Books. ISBN 0-8027-7674-4.
- Francis, Panama; Reiser, Bob (2002). David Gets His Drum. Marshall Cavendish. ISBN 978-0-7614-5088-7.
- Haskins, Jim (2002). Champion: The Story of Muhammad Ali. Walker Childrens. ISBN 978-0-8027-8784-2.
- Ransom, Candice (2003). Liberty Street. Walker Childrens. ISBN 978-0-8027-8869-6.
- Walvoord, Linda (2004). Rosetta, Rosetta, Sit by Me!. Marshall Cavendish.
- Johnson, Angela (2005). A Sweet Smell of Roses. Simon Schuster Books for Young Readers. ISBN 978-0-689-83252-9.
- Krull, Kathleen (2005). Houdini: World's Greatest Mystery Man and Escape King. Walker Childrens. ISBN 978-0-8027-8953-2.
- Brewster, Hugh (2006). The Other Mozart: The Life of the Famous Chevalier de Saint-George. Abrams Books for Young Readers. ISBN 978-0-8109-5720-6.
- Weatherford, Carole Boston (2007). I, Matthew Henson: Polar Explorer. Walker Books. ISBN 978-0-8027-9688-2.
- Weatherford, Carole Boston (2007). Jesse Owens: Fastest Man Alive. Walker Books. ISBN 978-0-8027-9550-2.
- Boswell, Addie (2008). The Rain Stomper. Marshall Cavendish.
- Grimes, Nikki (2009). Voices of Christmas. Zonderkidz. ISBN 978-0-310-71192-6.
- Weatherford, Carole Boston (2009). Racing Against the Odds: Wendell Scott, African American Stock Car Champion. Marshall Cavendish Children's Books. ISBN 978-0-7614-5465-6.
- Dant, Traci (2010). Some Kind of Love: A Family Reunion in Poems. Two Lions. ISBN 978-0-761-45559-2.
- Hudson, Cheryl Willis (2010). My Friend Maya Loves to Dance. Harry N. Abrams. ISBN 978-0-810-98328-1.
- Watkins, Angela Farris (2010). My Uncle Martin's Big Heart. Abrams. ISBN 978-0-8109-8975-7.
- Malaspina, Ann (2011). Touch the Sky: Alice Coachman, Olympic High Jumper. Albert Whitman & Co. ISBN 978-0-8075-8035-6.
- Brigham, Marilyn (2012). Swim!. Marshall Cavendish. ISBN 978-0-7614-6253-8.
- Michelson, Richard (2012). Twice as Good: The Story of William Powell and Clearview, the Only Golf Course Designed, Built, and Owned by an African American. Sleeping Bear Press. ISBN 978-1-585-36466-4.
- Fradin, Judith Bloom; Fradin, Dennis Brindell (2013). The Price of Freedom: How One Town Stood Up to Slavery. Walker Books. ISBN 978-0-8027-2166-2.
- Patricia, McKissack (2013). Ol' Clip Clop. Holiday House. ISBN 978-0-823-42265-4.
- Tuck, Pamela M. (2013). As Fast as Words Could Fly. Lee & Low. ISBN 978-1-60060-348-8.
- Bolden, Tonya (2014). Beautiful Moon: A Child's Prayer. Harry N. Abrams. ISBN 978-1-419-70792-6.
- Ieronimo, Christine (2014). A Thirst for Home: A Story of Water Across the World. Walker Books. ISBN 978-0-8027-2307-9.
- Meyer, Susan Lynn (2014). New Shoes. Holiday House. ISBN 978-0-8234-2528-0.
- Weatherford, Carole Boston (2017). Schomburg: The Man Who Built a Library. Candlewick Press. ISBN 978-1-53-620897-9.
- Strong Voices: Fifteen American Speeches Worth Knowing. Introduction by Tonya Bolden and foreword by Cokie Roberts. HarperCollins. 2020. ISBN 978-0-06-257204-2.
- Rappaport, Doreen (2020). Ruth Objects: The Life of Ruth Bader Ginsburg. Disney/Hyperion. ISBN 978-1-484-74717-9.
- Russell-Brown, Katheryn (2020). She was the First! The Trailblazing Life of Shirley Chisholm. Lee & Low. ISBN 978-1-620-14346-9.
- Robbins, Dean (2021). ¡Mambo Mucho Mambo! The Dance that Crossed Color Lines. Candlewick. ISBN 978-1-536-20608-1.
- Bolden, Tonya (2022). Going Places: Victor Hugo Green and His Glorious Book. Quill Tree. ISBN 978-0-06-296740-4.
- Weatherford, Carole Boston (2024). Outspoken: Paul Robeson, Ahead of His Time: A One-Man Show. Candlewick Press. ISBN 978-1-5362-1297-6.
