= Richard Michelson =

American poet and writer

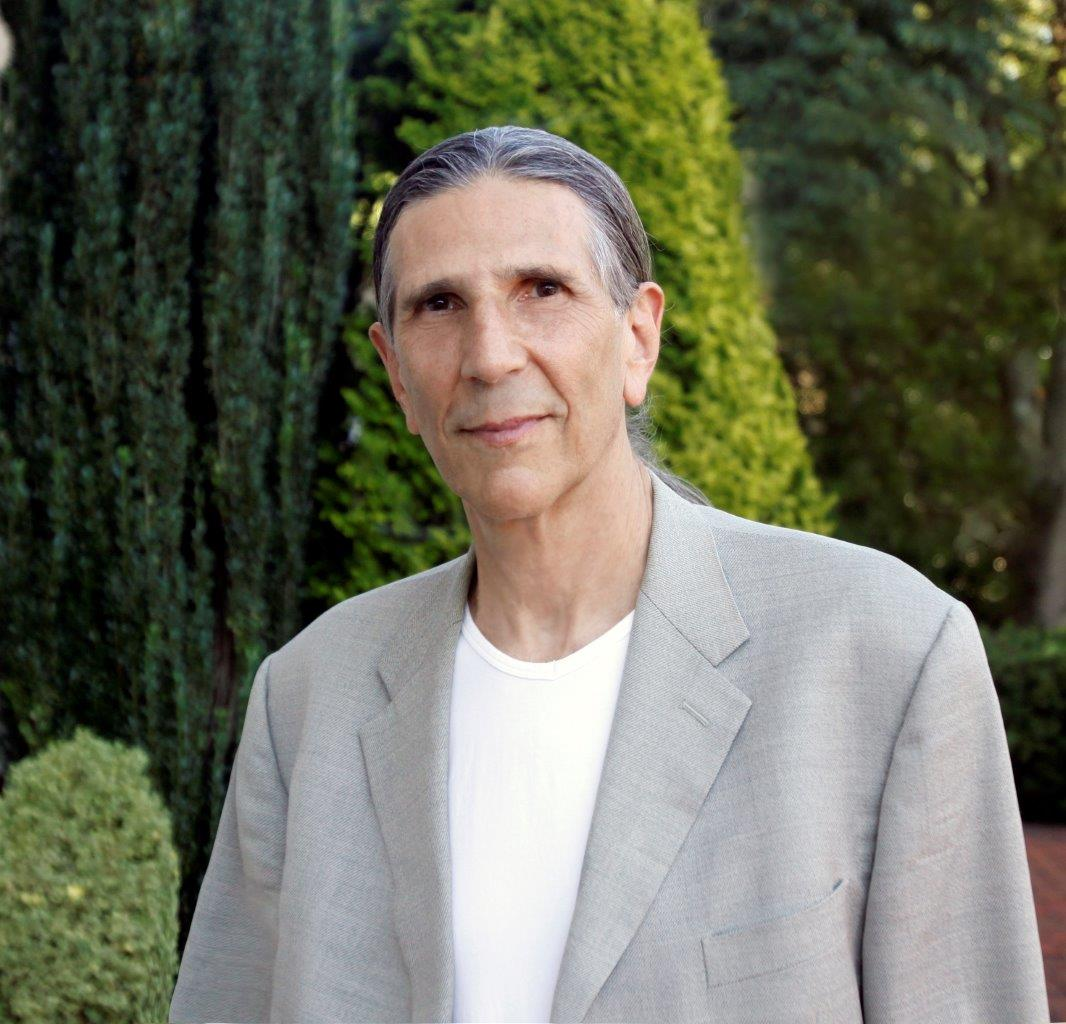
- Born: 3 July 1953; Brooklyn, NY
- Writing career
- Genres: Children's Literature, Poetry
- Website: richardmichelson.com

Richard Michelson (born July 3, 1953) is a poet and a children's book author. He is the first author to receive both of the top two book awards given by the Association of Jewish Libraries in a single year.

In January 2009, Michelson's book titled As Good As Anybody: Martin Luther King and Abraham Joshua Heschel's Amazing March Toward Freedom, was awarded the Sydney Taylor Book Award Gold Medal from the Association of Jewish Libraries, and A is for Abraham, was awarded the Silver Medal. This was the first time in the award's 50-year history that a single author was honored with both of their top two awards. Michelson received his 2nd Silver Medal in 2017 and his 2nd Gold Medal in 2018.

Michelson has twice been a finalist for the National Jewish Book Award (2008, 2006) and won the 2017 National Jewish Book Award for The Language of Angels. He was twice the recipient of the Skipping Stones Multicultural Book Award (2009, 2003). Other recognition includes a National Network of Teachers of the Year Social Justice Award 2017, two Massachusetts Book Award Finalist (2017, 2009), two NYTimes Notable Children's Books (2010, 2011), a 2007 Teacher's Choice Award from the International Reading Association, and a 2007 Publishers Weekly Best Book Award. In 2019 Michelson became the sixth recipient of the Samuel Minot Jones Award for Literary Achievement.

Clemson University named Michelson as the Richard J. Calhoun Distinguished Reader in American Literature for 2008, and he was the featured poet for the 20th Anniversary edition of Image Journal: Art Faith Mystery. Michelson's poetry has been included in many anthologies, including The Norton Introduction to Poetry, Unsettling America: Contemporary Multicultural Poetry, and Blood to Remember: American Poets on the Holocaust. Battles & Lullabies, published by the University of Illinois Press, was selected as one of the 12 best poetry books of 2006 by ForeWord Magazine. More Money than God, published by the University of Pittsburgh Press, was runner up for the 2016 Paterson Prize. Sleeping as Fast as I Can (Slant Books) is forthcoming in April 2023.

Michelson has lectured, and read from his works in India, Eastern Europe, and throughout the United States. He represented the United States at the Bratislava Biennial of Children's Books in 2005. Michelson has written for the New York Times Book Review, Publishers Weekly, Nextbook and other publications. He was the Curator of Exhibitions at the National Yiddish Book Center and owns R. Michelson Galleries in Northampton, Massachusetts.

== Personal life ==
Born in Brooklyn, New York, Michelson was the son of a shopkeeper, Maurice, and homemaker, Caroline (Kay). Michelson experienced personal tragedy in his late twenties when his father was killed during a robbery. The horrors of the holocaust also figured strongly; Michelson's aunt, recalling her years as a young Jew living in Europe, is haunted by memories of Hitler's Gestapo. While his poetry for adults—published in the collections Tap Dancing for the Relatives and Battles and Lullabies—reflects the serious nature of his reflections on history, racism, and culture, his work for younger readers is inspired by his love of, and respect for family and culture.

In 1972, when Michelson was only 19, he set off on a tour of the mid-west, selling fine-art reproductions for three years and subsequently becoming devoted to art and literature. It was during this time that Michelson met his wife to-date, Jennifer Michelson, currently an Interfaith Minister.

Michelson's wife, Jennifer, and he have two children, Marisa and Samuel. Marisa is a composer and playwright. Samuel is the Director of Operations at a high end architectural hardware company called Nanz. Their hobbies include theater and biking.

== Career ==
Richard Michelson is a poet, children's book author, curator, speaker, and owner of R. Michelson Galleries located in Northampton, MA. He has also curated exhibitions at the National Yiddish Book Center. Michelson is a popular guest speaker and lecturer. He has traveled throughout the world talking to children and teachers about his love of poetry and social justice.

In 1976, Michelson was able to open his first art gallery which he ran for three years before moving back to the east coast and opening the R. Michelson Galleries, a 4-story monumental old bank building with 60 ft. ceilings and marble floors located in Northampton MA, which Michelson continues to run to this day. It exhibits the works of numerous contemporary sculptors, painters, and printmakers. His gallery showcases well known artists such as Leonard Baskin (sculptor and printmaker), Leonard Nimoy (photographer, actor), Randall Deihl (painter), Thomas Locker (landscape artist) and more than 50 additional artists. It also incorporates a wide range of illustration art, including original works by Theodor Seuss Geisel, Mo Willems, Jane Dyer, Mordicai Gerstein, Trina Schart Hyman, Maurice Sendak, Barry Moser, Tony DiTerlizzi, Mary Azarian, E. B. Lewis, Diane DeGroat, and Jules Feiffer.

Michelson hosts Northampton Poetry Radio, and served two terms as Poet Laureate of Northampton, Massachusetts.

== Bibliography ==
=== Children's books ===
- Next Year in the White House: The Journey to Barack Obama's First Presidential Seder, illustrated by EB Lewis (Crown Books for Young readers, Spring 2025)
- More Than Enough: a story inspired by Maimonides Golden Ladder of Giving, illustrated by Joe Cepeda. (Peachtree, Spring 2025)
- What Louis Brandeis Knows: A Crusader for Social Justice Becomes a Supreme Court Justice, illustrated by Stacy Innerst (Astra- Calkins Creek, Fall 2025)
- Fanny's Big Idea: How Jewish Book Week was Born, Illustrated by Alyssa Russell (Rocky Pond- Penguin Random House, Fall 2025)
- One of a Kind: The Life of Sydney Taylor, Illustrated by Sarah Green (Astra- Calkins Creek, 2024)
- The Language of Angels, Illustrated by Karla Gudeon (Charlesbridge, 2017).
- Fascinating, Illustrated by Edel Rodriguez (Knopf, 2016).
- S is for Sea Glass, Illustrated by Doris Ettlinger (Sleeping Bear Press, 2014).
- Twice as Good, Illustrated by Eric Velasquez (Sleeping Bear Press, 2012).
- Lipman Pike, Illustrated by Zachary Pullen (Sleeping Bear Press, 2011).
- Busing Brewster, illustrated by R.G. Roth (Knopf, 2010).
- A is For Abraham: A Jewish Family Alphabet, Illustrated by Ron Mazellan (Sleeping Bear Press, 2008).
- Animals Anonymous (verse collection), Illustrated by Scott Fischer (Simon & Schuster, 2008).
- As Good As Anybody: Martin Luther King and Abraham Joshua Heschel’s Amazing March Towards Freedom, Illustrated by Raul Colon (Knopf, 2008).
- Tuttle's Red Barn, Illustrated by Mary Azarian (Putnam, 2007).
- Oh, No, Not Ghosts! (verse collection), Illustrated by Adam McCauley (Harcourt, 2006).
- Across the Alley (picture book), Illustrated by E.B. Lewis (Putnam, 2006).
- Happy Feet: The Savoy Ballroom Lindy Hoppers and Me, Illustrated by E.B. Lewis (Harcourt), 2005).
- Too Young for Yiddish, Illustrated by Neil Waldman (Talewinds, 2002).
- Ten Times Better (verse collection), Illustrated by Leonard Baskin (Marshall Cavendish, 2000).
- Grandpa's Gamble, Illustrated by Barry Moser (Marshall Cavendish, 1999).
- A Book of Flies Real or Otherwise (verse collection), Illustrated by Leonard Baskin (Marshall Cavendish, 1999).
- Animals That Ought to Be: Poems about Imaginary Pets, Illustrated by Leonard Baskin (Simon & Schuster, 1996).
- Did You Say Ghosts? (verse collection), Illustrated by Leonard Baskin (Macmillan, 1993).

=== Forthcoming ===
- The Passover Sandwich (Peachtree, Spring 2026)

=== Poems for Adults ===
- Sleeping as Fast as I Can (Slant Books, 2023)
- More Money than God (University of Pittsburgh Press, 2015)
- Battles and Lullabies, University of Illinois Press (Urbana, IL), 2006.
- Masks, Illustrated by Leonard Baskin, Gehenna Press (Rockport, ME), 1999.
- Semblant, Illustrated by Leonard Baskin (Gehenna Press, 1992).
- Tap Dancing for the Relatives, Illustrated by Barry Moser (University of Central Florida Press, 1985).

== Themes & Influences ==
In picture books such as Grandpa's Gamble, Too Young for Yiddish, and Happy Feet Michelson depicts close-knit family relationships. Reflecting his own Jewish traditions, Grandpa's Gamble finds a young boy trying to understand why his elderly grandfather spends so much time in prayerful silence. When the boy's question is answered by Grandpa Sam, the boy learns about the persecution of Jews in Poland many years before, and about how his immigrant grandfather had used the opportunities available in America to become a wealthy man before the illness of a child humbled him and caused him to return to his faith. Too Young for Yiddish again finds a boy turning to his grandfather, or Zayde, for guidance, this time with the hope of learning Yiddish. Although the man dismisses the child's request due to the boy's youth, his collection of books create a connection between the two generations as time passes. In Booklist Hazel Rochman deemed Grandpa's Gamble a "moving immigrant Passover story" that brings to life "the intimate bonds of love and faith across generations," while a Publishers Weekly critic wrote that Too Young for Yiddish "possesses both power and pathos" and stands as an "urgent" reminder to readers that the Yiddish language is slowly being lost to time. A Detroit Jewish News critic wrote "One of the best Jewish children's books published in recent memory, and one of the top 25 ever published."

Although the family is African American, Happy Feet is similar in theme to Michelson's Jewish-themed picture books because it centers on a strong family. Focusing on the parent-child relationship, the story is narrated by a young boy whose father runs a business across the street from Harlem's Savoy ballroom, where the family has a front-row seat to the parade of culture, swing music, dance, and celebrity that passes through the dance palace's doors. Showcasing the rich culture that flowered in that New York neighborhood during the early twentieth century, Happy Feet serves as "a valentine to the renowned Savoy" as well as a "tribute [that] will take young readers back to Harlem-as-it-was," according to a Kirkus Reviews writer. The "beautifully lit, expressive watercolor" illustrations by Caldecott Medal-winning artist E.B. Lewis add to the book's magic, according to Booklist contributor Carolyn Phelan, and in School Library Journal Nina Lindsay deemed Happy Feet a "charming" story in which Michelson presents "a dramatic read-aloud introduction" to the Jazz Era. Across the Alley, is about Abe and Willie, next door neighbors. During the day they don't play together, because Abe is Jewish and Willie is black. But at night, when nobody is watching, they're best friends. The Kirkus Review says “Set during the time of segregation, the story lends hope for a future without racism... A beautiful blend of story and art." This book was runner up for the National Jewish Book Award 2007. As Good As Anybody is also about the friendship between blacks and Jews. In a starred review, Booklist (American Library Association)said “In this powerful, well-crafted story about a partnership between two great civil rights leaders, Michelson shows how the fight for human rights affects everyone... Michelson writes in poetic language that gracefully uses repetitive sentence structures and themes to emphasize the similarities between the two men’s lives. Also admirable is Michelson’s ability to convey complex historical concepts, such as segregation, in clear, potent terms that will speak directly to readers:...an exceptional title for sharing and discussion.

== Biographical & Critical Sources ==
Booklist, September 1, 1993, Ilene Cooper, review of Did You Say Ghosts?, p. 69;
October 15, 1996, Hazel Rochman, review of Animals That Ought to Be: Poems about Imaginary Pets, p. 427;
March 15, 1999, Hazel Rochman, review of Grandpa's Gamble, p. 1333;
October 1, 2000, Michael Cart, review of Ten Times Better, p. 343;
November 1, 2005, Carolyn Phelan, review of Happy Feet: The Savoy Ballroom Lindy Hoppers and Me, p. 60.
Daily Hampshire Gazette (Amherst, MA), May 3, 2006, Bonnie Wells, "Poetry That Speaks of Everyday Cruelties and Love."
Horn Book, March–April, 1994, Lolly Robinson, review of Did You Say Ghosts?, p. 192;
November–December, 1996, Mary M. Burns, review of Animals That Ought to Be, p. 754;
September, 1999, Mary M. Burns, review of A Book of Flies Real or Otherwise, p. 620.
Kirkus Reviews, January 15, 2002, review of Too Young for Yiddish, p. 106;
November 1, 2005, review of Happy Feet, p. 1186.
New Yorker, December 13, 1993, review of Did You Say Ghosts?, p. 117.
Publishers Weekly, August 2, 1993, review of Did You Say Ghosts?, p. 81;
September 23, 1996, review of Animals That Ought to Be, p. 76; March 22, 1999, review of Grandpa's Gamble, p. 90;
August 2, 1999, review of A Book of Flies Real or Otherwise, p. 82;
July 31, 2000, review of Ten Times Better, p. 94;
January 14, 2002, review of Too Young for Yiddish, p. 60.
School Library Journal, October, 2000, Nina Lindsay, review of Ten Times Better, p. 190;
March, 2002, Linda R. Silver, review of Too Young for Yiddish, p. 198;
November, 2005, Nina Lindsay, review of Happy Feet, p. 100.
