= Dork Diaries =

Book series by Rachel Renée Russell

- Logo of the series
- Author: Rachel Renée Russell
- Illustrator: Rachel Renée Russell; Nikki Russell
- Language: English
- Genre: Realistic fiction, comedy, children's book
- Publisher: Aladdin Paperbacks
- Publication date: June 2009–present
- Publication place: United States (published in 52 countries)
- Media type: Print (hardcover)/ebook

Dork Diaries is a children's book series written by Rachel Renée Russell and illustrated by Nikki Russell and Rachel Renée Russell.

The series, written in a diary format, uses drawings, doodles, and comic strips to chronicle the daily life of its 14 (later 15)-year-old protagonist, Nikki Maxwell.

As of December 2024, more than 55 million copies of the Dork Diaries books have been sold. The books have been published in 52 countries with translations into 45 different languages.

== Books ==
#	Title	Date	ISBN
1	Tales from a Not-So-Fabulous Life; Dork Diaries (UK)	June 2, 2009	978-1416980063
2	Tales from a Not-So-Popular Party Girl; Party Time (UK)	June 8, 2010	978-1416980087
3	Tales from a Not-So-Talented Pop Star; Pop Star (UK)	June 7, 2011	978-1442411906
4	Tales from a Not-So-Graceful Ice Princess; Skating Sensation (UK)	June 5, 2012	978-1536403527
5	Tales from a Not-So-Smart Miss Know-it-All; Dear Dork (UK)	October 2, 2012	978-1442449619
6	Tales from a Not-So-Happy Heartbreaker; Holiday Heartbreak (UK)	June 4, 2013	978-1442449633
7	Tales from a Not-So-Glam TV Star; TV Star (UK)	June 4, 2014	978-1484429976
8	Tales from a Not-So-Happily Ever After; Once Upon a Dork (UK)	September 30, 2014	978-1481421843
9	Tales from a Not-So-Dorky Drama Queen; Drama Queen (UK)	June 2, 2015	978-1442487697
10	Tales from a Not-So-Perfect Pet Sitter; Puppy Love (UK)	October 20, 2015	978-1481457040
11	Tales from a Not-So-Friendly Frenemy; Frenemies Forever (UK)	November 15, 2016	978-1481479202
12	Tales from a Not-So-Secret Crush Catastrophe; Crush Catastrophe (UK)	June 14, 2018	978-1534405608
13	Tales from a Not-So-Happy Birthday; Birthday Drama! (UK)	July 25, 2019	978-1534426382
14	Tales from a Not-So-Best-Friend Forever; Spectacular Superstar (UK)	October 22, 2019	978-1534427204
15	Tales from a Not-So-Posh Paris Adventure; I Love Paris! (UK)	September 26, 2023	978-1534480483
16	Tales from a Not-So-Bratty Little Sister; Sister Showdown (UK)	October 15, 2024	978-1665974608

=== Companion novels ===
- How to Dork Your Diary (October 8, 2011), presented as the third-and-half entry in the main series, is an activity book containing activities for the reader to write their own diary in the style of the books. It starts with the premise of Nikki losing her diary and then presenting her diary tips to make up for the loss.
- Dork Diaries OMG!: All About Me Diary! (October 8, 2013) is an activity book which offers a prompt for the reader to answer for each day of the year.

=== Audiobooks ===
Audiobooks for books 1 and 2 were released on September 28, 2010.

=== The Misadventures of Max Crumbly spinoff ===
This spin-off series, also written by Russell, focuses on Maxwell "Max" Crumbly, the character introduced in Tales from a Not-So-Perfect Pet Sitter and, also written in diary format, his life in middle school.

#	Title	Date	ISBN
1	Locker Hero	June 7, 2016	978-1484481264
2	Middle School Mayhem	June 6, 2017	978-1481460033
3	Masters of Mischief	June 4, 2019	978-1534453494

== Characters ==
Nicole Jullianne "Nikki" Maxwell

Nikki is the main character of the series. She is a 14, later 15-year-old girl who initially transfers to Westchester Country Day, a private school she can only afford because of a scholarship. She lives with a family she considers weird (namely her father, an exterminator who drives around a van that has Max, a giant cockroach on top of it), and is bullied by Mackenzie and the CCPs (Cute, Cool, & Popular clique). She enjoys art and sketching and has a flair for it. She has two best friends, Chloe Christina Garcia and Zoeysha Ebony "Zoey" Franklin, and shows interest in Brandon Roberts, a fellow student who loves animals and photography. She is popularly depicted in colorized adaptions with brown eyes and brown hair, usually in pigtails, and is left-handed.

Mackenzie Hollister

The most popular girl at Westchester Country Day and the leader of the CCPs, she has a locker next to Nikki's. Mackenzie is a wealthy girl who is spoiled, self-centered, and mean. She always wears top designer clothes, carries expensive bags, and wears a lot of lip gloss. She also has a crush on Brandon Roberts and tries to flirt with him, especially by twirling her hair, whenever possible. Mackenzie often bullies Nikki, calling her a dork, talking behind Nikki's back, and trying to wreck her life with the help of her best friend, Jessica. She has blonde hair, blue eyes, and a little sister named Amanda, who is best friends with Nikki's sister, Brianna.

Chloe Christina Garcia

Nikki's best friend, Chloe is an avid reader and loves young adult romances. She is a self-proclaimed expert on boys and dating and works in the library with Nikki and Zoey. She is described as somewhat prissy but is a social outcast. Her parents own a software company. She is the second most unpopular girl at Westchester Country Day. She is Latina.

Zoeysha Ebony "Zoey" Franklin

Zoey is Nikki's other best friend. She is super-smart, also an avid reader, and a self-proclaimed expert in psychology. Nikki calls her a human Wikipedia. She enjoys self-help books and often quotes them. Zoey works in the school library with Nikki and Chloe. Her mother is an attorney and her father is a record executive, and they are divorced. Zoey is the third most unpopular girl in the school. She is African-American.

Brandon Roberts

Brandon is Nikki's and Mackenzie's crush. His favourite colour is blue. He is not as impressed by Mackenzie as everybody else, obviously preferring Nikki. In the second book, he asks her to dance. In the seventh book, he kisses Nikki at a kissing booth to raise money for charity. In the books, he is described as "super cute" with wavy hair. He is shy around Nikki. Brandon is a photographer for Westchester Middle School's newspaper, and in Dork Diaries: Tales From a Not-So-Talented Pop Star, it is revealed that Brandon plays the drums and joins Nikki's band, "Actually, I'm Not Really Sure Yet". He lives with his grandparents and works in an animal center called Fuzzy Friends. He loves caring for the dogs there and hopes to be a veterinarian in the future. In the 12th book, he finally confesses to Nikki that he likes her a lot.

Brianna Lynn Maxwell

Brianna is Nikki's 6-year-old sister. She is afraid of the tooth fairy because Nikki told her the tooth fairy collects children's teeth to make dentures for old people. She is terrible at cooking, often causing a mess, but she enjoys it. In the 13th book, she starts a business of dog biscuits that she makes herself, and earns more than $500 to pay for Nikki's birthday party. She has a imaginary friend named Miss Penelope (which is her hand with a face drawn on it with an ink pen) and loves Princess Sugar Plum. She is best friends with Amanda Hollister, Mackenzie Hollister's younger sister.

Jessica Hunter

The second highest-ranking CCPs at WCD and Mackenzie's best friend, she also dislikes Nikki and bullies her alongside Mackenzie. Jessica has brown-blonde hair and likes the colour pink.

Violet Baker

Violet is the most popular girl out of the most unpopular people. When she signs up to run for chairperson of WCD's Halloween dance, she loses to MacKenzie Hollister and signs up for the clean-up committee instead. When Mackenzie quits, Violet becomes head of the entertainment committee. She has a huge iTunes collection and rides in a wheelchair. She appears in the second and third book. In Dork Diaries: Tales From a Not So Talented Pop Star, it is revealed that Violet plays the piano. She is the pianist in Nikki's band, "Actually, I'm Not Really Sure Yet".

Theodore L. "Theo" Swagmire III

One of the unpopular boys in WCD and one of Nikki's friends, Theo is known for being the school's nerd, and in Dork Diaries: Tales From a Not So Talented Pop Star, it is revealed that he plays guitar. He is the lead guitarist in Nikki's band, "Actually, I'm Not Really Sure Yet". He had a big crush on Mackenzie, but now has a crush on Zoey Franklin because they went together as dates to the Sweetheart Dance in Dork Diaries: Tales From a Not-So Happy Heartbreaker.

Marcy Simms

Nikki meets Marcy through her post as Miss-Know-It-All. Marcy sends an anonymous letter to Miss Know-It-All, saying that she is new, being bullied by some other girls, and can't find friends. Nikki tells her to hang in there and keeps a lookout for the new girl. She soon finds Marcy and invites her to Brandon's birthday party, where Marcy has a great time. Marcy is Mackenzie's assistant fashion director for the newspaper but is bullied by Mackenzie, and is deemed to be unfashionable by the latter. Marcy wears sports glasses and has short hair.

Marcus

Marcus is a recurring character in the Dork Diaries series. He is the guitarist of Nikki's band. He appears in Dork Diaries: Tales From a Not-So Talented Pop Star and Dork Diaries: Tales From a Not-So Happy Heartbreaker. He appears to be a thoughtful character and is also known as one of the smartest people in school along with Theodore L. Swagmire III. He also has a crush on Chloe Garcia, and the both of them went on a date at the Sweetheart Dance in Dork Diaries: Tales From a Not-So Happy Heartbreaker.

Tiffany Davenport

Tiffany is the secondary antagonist of the Dork Diaries series. She is a student at North Hampton Hills International Academy, along with her best friends, Hayley and Ava. She debuted in Dork Diaries: Tales from a Not-So Friendly Frenemy. She is Nikki's enemy and Mackenzie's frenemy. Her mother found out in book 12 that she was a cyberbully, and forced her to do community service during the summer (which Tiffany disliked). André is her stepbrother.

André

André is Tiffany's stepbrother and was introduced in Dork Diaries: Tales from a Not-So-Secret Crush Catastrophe as Nikki's pen pal. Nikki first believes that he is a girl named Andrea and accidentally reveals some embarrassing information to him as a result, but they both become friends. André somewhat rivaled Brandon Roberts for Nikki's affection at first, but he eventually understood that Nikki only saw him as a friend and backed off. He is also the first and only friend of Nikki to call her Nicole.

== Reception, awards, and honors ==
Kirkus Reviews' review of Tales from a Not-So-Fabulous Life praises the humor and ability to reflect upon early adolescence experiences well, stating that "Nikki's journey of self-discovery will appeal to preadolescent readers struggling to find their places in the world".

As of December 2024, the Dork Diaries series has spent 334 weeks on The New York Times bestseller list in the Children's Series category with 18 consecutive New York Times bestselling books.

Book 1

Dork Diaries: Tales From a Not-So-Fabulous Life was on the New York Times bestseller list for 42 weeks upon release and the USA Today bestseller list for 7 weeks. It was awarded the 2010 Children's Choice Book of the Year Award for the 5th/6th grade division and was nominated as Book of the Year by the Nickelodeon Kids Choice Awards in February 2011.

Book 2

Dork Diaries: Tales From a Not-So-Popular Party Girl was on the New York Times bestseller list for 42 weeks upon release and the USA Today bestseller list for 12 weeks. Books 1 and 2 appeared on The New York Times bestseller list simultaneously for 17 weeks, with the former peaking at #4 and the latter at #2.

Book 3

Dork Diaries: Tales From A Not-So-Talented Pop Star was on the New York Times bestseller list for 28 weeks upon release and the USA Today bestseller list for 28 weeks.

Book 3 1/2

Dork Diaries: How To Dork Your Diary was on the New York Times bestseller list for 14 weeks upon release.

The eighth book, Tales of a Not-So-Happily Ever After, won the 2015 NAACP Image Award for Outstanding Literary Work – Children award.

== Film adaptation ==
In March 2014, Summit Entertainment acquired the film rights to the series. Karen Rosenfelt was reportedly in talks to produce, but no news has been released about its development since then.
