= Tonya Bolden =

American writer (born 1959)

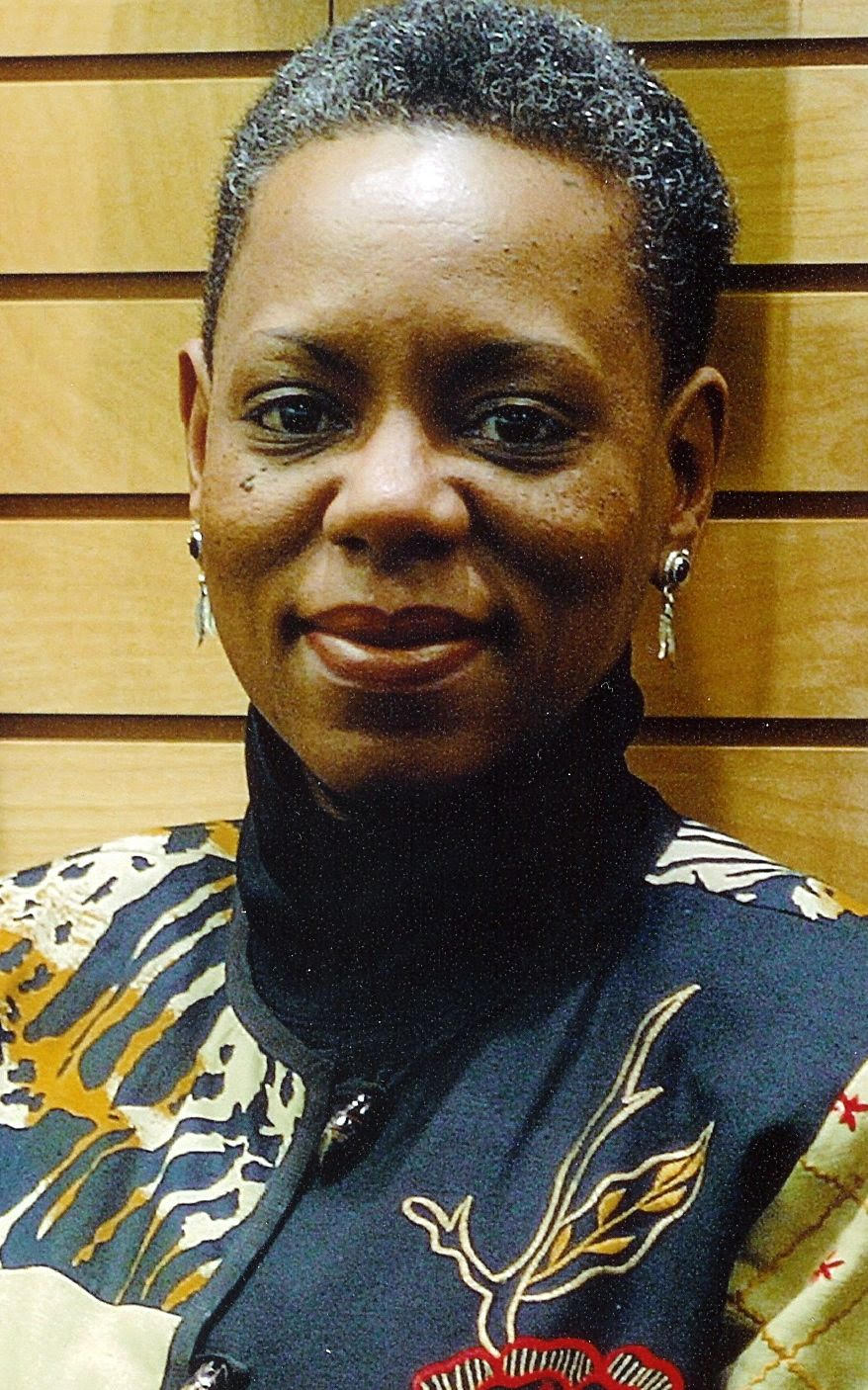
- Portrait of Tonya Bolden
- Born: March 1, 1959 (age 67); New York City, New York, US
- Education: Princeton University; Columbia University
- Occupation: Author

Tonya K. Bolden (born March 1, 1959) is an American writer best known for her works of children's literature, especially children's nonfiction. Bolden has authored, co-authored, collaborated on, or edited more than forty books. Hillary Rodham Clinton praised her 1998 book 33 Things Every Girl Should Know in a speech at Seneca Falls, on the 150th anniversary of the first Women's Rights Convention. Maritcha: A Nineteenth-Century American Girl (2005), her children's biography of Maritcha Rémond Lyons, was the James Madison Book Award Winner and one of four honor books for the American Library Association’s Coretta Scott King Author Award. M.L.K.: Journey of a King (2007) won the Orbis Pictus award from the National Council of Teachers of English, the organization’s highest award for children’s nonfiction, and the next year, her George Washington Carver (2008) was one of five honor books for the same award. In 2016, the Children’s Book Guild of Washington, D.C. selected Bolden for its Nonfiction Award in recognition of her entire body of work, which, according to the award, has “contributed significantly to the quality of nonfiction for children.”.

== Life and career ==
=== Early years ===
Tonya Bolden was born on March 1, 1959, in New York City to Willie J. and Georgia C. Bolden, who had moved to New York from North Carolina and South Carolina, respectively. Georgia received formal education only through sixth grade, Willie through ninth. However, both were firmly dedicated to providing as many educational opportunities as possible to Tonya and her sister Nelta. Although her parents were careful with money, they were generous when it came to buying books, and Bolden specifically recalls that “whenever I came home with the list of books I wanted to buy at the Arrow Club book fair, they never, ever denied me.”

Although Bolden has claimed that her love of writing while in her parents’ home influenced her eventual choice of career, her parents’ habit of encouraging reading had as much to do with her personal joy as it did her eventual professional prospects. Her parents, she recalls, “encouraged me to seek to earn a living doing something I absolutely loved. And when I was a child, I was crazy about reading and writing.”. Indeed, Bolden has said that she has “been in love with books since I learned my ABCs” (Trussell).

Ironically, although Bolden is today best known for her historical fiction and nonfiction, as a child she was pointedly uninterested in history, especially in history learned through books. “It was usually presented in such an uninteresting way,” she recalls. “I didn’t see myself or my people in history.” Even when her uncle, whom she describes as “a history freak,” tried to introduce her to black history in Harlem, she often found herself thinking, “I don’t care.” A rare exception was that she enjoyed the Little House on the Prairie television program, though today she suspects that she probably enjoyed it “for the props” or its “old-timey” aspects.

=== Education ===
Bolden's early education was also marked by her parents’ firm investment in her growth. Although her mother had no personal experience with quality education in New York, she did extensive research to learn where her daughter could get the best education (Maher 40). Bolden attended M.E.S. 146, a public school in East Harlem, and later the Chapin School, a private school on Manhattan's Upper East Side. Bolden has credited excellent teaching at both of these schools with influencing her growth as a writer and desire to publish.

After graduating from Chapin, Bolden attended Princeton University, where, in 1981, she completed an undergraduate degree in Slavic Languages and Literature, with an emphasis on Russian.,

Following her graduation from Princeton, Bolden worked for two years before returning to school. She then continued her studies at Columbia. Bolden has suggested that, along with the multicultural setting of her childhood, her study of Russian in higher education deeply influenced her writing. She completed her M.A. in 1985, again in Slavic Languages and Literatures with a concentration in Russian.

=== Early career ===
Following her graduation, Bolden taught at both Malcolm-King College and the College of New Rochelle. Her responsibilities included English courses, and she has mentioned that “the course I taught the most was TEE (Translating Experience into Essay). Many of my students were my age or older. They were living proof that it’s never too late to learn.”

Although she intended to earn a doctorate and become a professor of Russian literature, it was while in graduate school that Bolden's work began appearing in print, at first mainly through freelance projects, notably in Black Enterprise magazine. In 1987, Bolden began writing full-time, putting her in a position in which, as she later recalls, “I could not be picky. I do not think I ever turned down any writing jobs no matter how small or seemingly insignificant.”

Bolden's first major book project, a young adult novel adaptation of Vy Higginsen’s musical Mama, I Want to Sing, was published in 1992 by Scholastic. Bolden has argued that this opportunity came about in part because of the work she had put in on smaller pieces and in part good fortune. She says, “Marie Brown, my agent at the time, pitched me to Vy Higginsen and to Scholastic,” and the experience went so well that “the editor talked about my doing another book for her.” Thus, she remembers, “writing for the young found me and I found myself loving it more and more.”

== Themes ==
Central to the overwhelming majority of Bolden's writing is an awareness of identity and the role that books can play in the formation and revision of identity. In a 2014 essay entitled “All the Children Need All the Books,” Bolden borrows a set of terms from Rudine Sims Bishop to argue that

We, who truly care about the future of this nation, we who truly want our youngsters to be their best selves, we absolutely must become more involved in the campaign for all children to have mirrors—books in which they see themselves—and for all children to have windows—books through which they learn about people who do not look like them, speak as they do, or worship as they do—people who do not share their cultural norms.

Children's books in general are important to this process, she argues, but she has stated elsewhere that nonfiction, especially historical nonfiction, is especially key to such a project. “What I came to understand as an adult,” she explains, “is that there is power in the past. Knowing history can be a powerful antidote to shame/self-hatred/identity-confusion.” A subset of the theme of the importance of identity in her work is a specifically black experience of history. She explains:

I write because I am the beneficiary of the prayers, hopes, and labors of generations, of people I never knew who braved water cannons, police dogs, burning crosses on lawns, so that I might have wider opportunities. How can I not contribute?

I write because my parents, born poor and into the world of Jim Crow, seeded in me a love of reading and for school and for learning and for striving for excellence.

And indeed, as Bolden explains elsewhere,

The fact that all but one of my young adult books are black-themed is not coincidental. Yes, all young adults can benefit from books about black history and culture; however, it is imperative that black youth read stories and histories about Africa and the African diaspora. I’ll never forget what a psychologist told me years ago: At about the age of four or five most African American children begin to wonder why the world does not like them. One way, and my main way to prevent this wondering from festering into self-loathing is to create books that definitively speak to black youth, books that teach them, that celebrate their history, their existence, their potential. Of course, I am far from alone on this mission.

Although not nearly as widespread in her work, Christianity is also a common theme, especially within the context of Black American experiences. In an interview with BlackandChristian.com, Bolden notes that

The Black Church has influenced me in a number of ways. In terms of history, it helped my people survive and build-up. In terms of my writing, the music of the Black Church (from the spirituals to gospel) and the tones and rhythms of classic black preaching have become part of my “vocabulary.” It's hard to articulate and even pinpoint, but I know that my style of writing has been influenced by the culture of the Black Church.

That sensibility manifests in many of her books, and Bolden has identified two books in particular in which readers can and, Bolden feels, should see the influence of Christianity. When discussing her 2001 book Rock of Ages: A Tribute to the Black Church, Bolden argued that “People shouldn't have to wait until they are 20 or 30 to learn about the significance of the Black Church.” Elsewhere, she has confided that she “took a risk” in the way that she wrote her 2006 book M.L.K.: Journey of a King by emphasizing the role of the “supernatural” in King's life: “many people prefer a King who is not so much of a Christian,” she explains.

== Papers ==
One box of Bolden's papers (consisting of production materials for three of her books) has been donated to the Kerlan Collection at the University of Minnesota Libraries.

== Books ==
- The Family Heirloom Cookbook (Putnam, 1990)
- Mama, I Want to Sing (Scholastic, 1992) (Co-author with Vy Higginsen)
- Starting a Business from Your Home (Longmeadow, 1993)
- Conversations: Straight Talk with America's Sister President (Doubleday, 1993) (Collaborator for Johnnetta B. Cole)
- Activity Booklet for Sweet Honey In The Rock recording I Got Shoes (Music For Little People, 1994) (Co-author with Bernice Johnson Reagon)
- Educator’s Guide for Wade in the Water: African American Sacred Music Traditions (26-part broadcast; NPR, 1994) (Co-author with Bernice Johnson Reagon, et al.)
- Mail-Order and Direct Response (Longmeadow, 1994)
- Rites of Passage: Stories About Growing Up by Black Writers From Around the World (Hyperion, 1994) (editor)
- The Book of African-American Women: 150 Crusaders, Creators, and Uplifters (Adams, 1996)
- Just Family (novel; Cobblehill, 1996)
- Through Loona's Door: A Tammy and Owen Adventure with Carter G. Woodson (Corporation for Cultural Literacy, 1997)
- And Not Afraid to Dare: The Stories of Ten African-American Women (Scholastic, 1998)
- 33 Things Every Girl Should Know: Stories, Songs, Poems, and Smart Talk by 33 Extraordinary Women (Crown, 1998) (editor)
- Strong Men Keep Coming: The Book of African-American Men (Wiley, 1999)
- Forgive or Forget: Never Underestimate the Power of Forgiveness (HarperCollins, 1999) (Co-author with Mother Love)
- Rejuvenate! (It’s Never Too Late) (Scribner/A Lisa Drew Book, 2001) (Co-author with Eartha Kitt)
- Rock of Ages: A Tribute to the Black Church (Knopf, 2001; Dell Dragonfly, 2003)
- Tell All the Children Our Story: Memories & Mementos of Being Young and Black in America (Abrams Books, 2001)
- 33 Things Every Girl Should Know About Women’s History (Crown, 2002) (editor)
- American Patriots: The Story of Blacks in the Military from the Revolution to Desert Storm (Crown, 2003) (Co-author with Gail Buckley: young readers’ edition)
- Chaka! Through the Fire (Rodale, 2003) (Co-author with Chaka Khan)
- Portraits of African-American Heroes (Dutton, 2003; Puffin Books, 2005)
- Wake Up Our Souls: A Celebration of Black American Artists (Abrams, 2004)
- The Champ: The Story of Muhammad Ali (Knopf, 2004; Dragonfly Books, 2007)
- Maritcha: A Nineteenth Century American Girl (Abrams, 2005)
- Cause: Reconstruction America, 1863-1877 (Knopf, 2005)
- Weddings Valentine Style (Atria, 2006) (Co-author with Diann Valentine)
- Half the Mother, Twice the Love: My Journey to Better Health with Diabetes (Atria, 2006) (Co-author with Mother Love)
- MLK: Journey of a King (Abrams, 2006)
- Take-Off: America All-Girl Bands During WWII (Knopf, 2007)
- George Washington Carver (Abrams, 2008)
- Say A Little Prayer (Running Press, 2008) (Co-author with Dionne Warwick and David Freeman Wooley)
- W. E. B. Du Bois: A Twentieth-Century Life (Viking, 2008)
- FDR’s Alphabet Soup: New Deal America, 1932-1939 (Knopf, 2010)
- Finding Family (Bloomsbury, 2010)
- Emancipation Proclamation: Lincoln and the Dawn of Liberty (Abrams, 2013)
- 12 Days of New York (Abrams, 2013)
- Searching for Sarah Rector: The Richest Black Girl in America (Abrams, 2014)
- Beautiful Moon: A Child’s Prayer (Abrams, 2014)
- Capital Days: Michael Shiner’s Journal and the Growth of Our Nation’s Capital (Abrams, 2015)
- This Kid Can Fly (Balzer + Bray, 2016) (Co-author with Aariana Rose Philip)
- How to Build a Museum: Smithsonian’s National Museum of African American History and Culture (Viking, 2016)
- Pathfinders: The Journeys of 16 Extraordinary Black Souls (Abrams, 2017)
- Crossing Ebenezer Creek (Bloomsbury, 2017)
- Facing Frederick: The Life of Frederick Douglass, a Monumental American Man (Abrams, 2017)
- Inventing Victoria (Bloomsbury, 2019)

== Awards and honors ==
In 2016, Bolden received the Nonfiction Award for Body of Work from the Children's Book Guild of Washington, DC.

Awards for individual books:

Mama, I Want to Sing

- New York Public Library Book for the Teen Age

Just Family

- Junior Library Guild Selection

And Not Afraid to Dare: The Stories of Ten African-American Women

- New York Public Library Book for the Teen Age
- Excerpted in the March–April 1999 Crisis

33 Things Every Girl Should Know: Stories, Songs, Poems, and Smart Talk by 33 Extraordinary Women

- ALA Best Book for Young Adults

Strong Men Keep Coming: The Book of African-American Men

- Black Expressions Book Club Selection
- New York Public Library Book for the Teen Age

Rock of Ages: A Tribute to the Black Church

- National Parenting Product Awards (NAPPA) Honors Award

Tell All the Children Our Story: Memories & Mementos of Being Young and Black in America

- 2002 School Library Journal Best Book of the Year
- 2002 ALA Best Book for Young Adults Nominee
- Scholastic TAB Book Club Selection (a Top Pick, January 2003)
- Black Expressions Book Club Selection

Portraits of African-American Heroes

- NCSS-CBC Notable Children's Trade Book in the Field of Social Studies

Wake Up Our Souls: A Celebration of Black American Artists

- YALSA Best Book for Young Adults
- VOYA Nonfiction Honor List

The Champ: The Story of Muhammad Ali

- Louisiana Young Readers’ Choice Award Selection
- Booklist Top 10 Youth Sports Book

Maritcha: A Nineteenth Century American Girl

- James Madison Book Award Winner
- Coretta Scott King Author Honor Book
- YALSA Best Book for Young Adults
- ALSC 2006 Notable Children's Book
- NAPPA Gold Award Winner
- CCBC Best Book of the Year
- New York Public Library Book for the Teen Age

Cause: Reconstruction America, 1863-1877

- New York Public Library Book for the Teen Age

M.L.K.: Journey of a King

- 2008 NCTE Orbis Pictus Award for Outstanding Nonfiction for Children

Take-Off: America All-Girl Bands During WWII

- New York Public Library Book for the Teen Age

George Washington Carver

- New York Public Library Book for the Teen Age
- A finalist for the 2009 AAAS/Subaru SB&F Prize for Excellence in Science Books
- NAPPA Gold Award
- NYPL's Children's Books: 100 Titles for Reading and Sharing
- Booklist pick for its 2008 “Top 10 Sci-Tech Books for Youth”
- Orbis Pictus Honor Book
- International Reading Association Notable Book for a Global Society
- Booklist Top 10 Black History Book
- Jefferson Cup winner (Virginia Library Association)
- Cleveland Public Library Sugarman Award

FDR's Alphabet Soup: New Deal America, 1932-1939

- Chicago Public Library “Best of the Best for 2010”
- IRA-CBC Teachers’ Choices Reading List Pick

Finding Family

- Kirkus Reviews Best Children's Books

Emancipation Proclamation: Lincoln and the Dawn of Liberty

- Bulletin Blue Ribbon Book
- Orbis Pictus Award Recommended Book
- ALSC Notable Children's Book
- NCSS Notable Social Studies Trade Book for Young People
- CCBC Choices, 2014
- Best Book of the Year, Children's Book Committee, Bank Street College of Education
- NCSS Carter G. Woodson Book Award, 2014

Searching for Sarah Rector: The Richest Black Girl in America

- NAACP Image Award Nominee
- Best Multicultural Children's Book, Center for the Study of Multicultural Children's Literature
- California Reading Association Eureka! Honor Book
- Wisconsin Reading Association Recommended Book
- NCSS Carter G. Woodson Honor Award

Beautiful Moon: A Child's Prayer

- NAACP Image Award Nominee
- Charlotte Zolotow Award Honor Book
- ALSC Notable Children's Book
