= Mama, I Want to Sing! (film) =

- Official poster
- Directed by: Charles Randolph-Wright
- Written by: Charles Randolph-Wright
- Based on: Mama, I Want to Sing! by Vy Higginsen and Ken Wydro
- Produced by: Holly Davis Carter; Jeff Clanagan; David Pomier
- Starring: Ciara Harris-Wilson; Lynn Whitfield; Patti LaBelle; Juanita Bynum; Hill Harper; Billy Zane; Ben Vereen
- Cinematography: Keith Smith
- Edited by: John Sitter
- Music by: Vy Higginsen; Ken Wydro
- Production companies: Vision Films; CodeBlack Entertainment
- Distributed by: Fox Faith (through 20th Century Fox Home Entertainment)
- Release date: February 14, 2012
- Running time: 95 minutes
- Country: United States
- Language: English
- Budget: $5 million

Mama, I Want to Sing! is a 2012 musical drama film starring Ciara, written and directed by Charles Randolph-Wright, an adaptation of the 1983 off-Broadway gospel stage musical of the same name written and produced by Vy Higginsen and Ken Wydro. It was the final film produced by Fox Faith prior to its dissolving.

The film is based on the life story of Higginsen's sister, Doris Troy, a preacher's daughter who sang in a church choir before being discovered by James Brown. Ciara made her feature film debut in the lead role of Doris Wine/Amara.

Reportedly completed in June 2009, an official trailer released in September 2009. The film was set to premiere in New York City that month, but was canceled due to technical issues. Following several planned and canceled dates, Mama, I Want to Sing! was finally released straight-to-DVD on February 14, 2012.

== Plot ==
Amara Winter (Ciara), a beautiful and charismatic young singer, is on the verge of stardom. Raised in the church by her father, Reverend Dr. Kenneth Winter (Marvin Winans) and mother, Lillian Winter (Lynn Whitfield), Amara and her younger brother Luke (Kevin Phillips) have a very strong bond. After her father's untimely death, her mother is thrust into the limelight in the role as preacher, a daring move that ultimately catapults her to the top of the gospel world. Paralleling her mother's success, Amara soon becomes a huge star in her own right, taking the R&B world by storm.

Conflict begins to ensue when her mother is confronted with, and unequivocally disapproves of, Amara's secular music and videos. Amara must learn to pursue her dreams while navigating the often treacherous world of celebrity and striving to remain true to herself and family. Amara and her mother must work through their differences realizing that their journeys are not quite so different after all.

== Cast ==
- Ciara as Doris Winter / Amara
  - Mariah Roberson as Young Doris Winter
- Lynn Whitfield as Dr. Lillian Winter, Doris' Mother
- Marvin Winans as Reverend Winter, Doris' Father
- Patti LaBelle as Sister Carrie
- Billy Zane as Dillan, Doris' Producer
- Hill Harper as Jeff Andrews, Doris' Manager
- Kim Porter as Tara
- Ben Vereen as Horace Payne
- Ava Santana as Dr. Winter's Assistant
- Kevin Phillips as Luke Winter, Amara's Brother
  - Michael Josiah Foster as Young Luke Winter
- Alexandra Cheron as Kimberly
- Juanita Bynum as Beverly
- Shonda Farr as Holly
- Courtney Shay Young as Doris Wardrobe
- Geraldine Glenn as Still Photographer
- Marissa D'Onofrio as Sienna
- Gospel For Teens Choir

== Production ==
Tarralyn Ramsey and Paris Bennett auditioned for the role of Amara before CodeBlack Entertainment offered the role to Ciara. Vy Higginsen, the original playwright for the off-Broadway production of "Mama, I Want to Sing!", assisted Charles Randolph-Wright with the script. Shalyric Self was set to portray the younger version of Amara, but due to contract issues, she was replaced by Mariah Roberson.

== Broadcast ==
The film was shown on BET for the first time on August 19, 2012.

== Songs ==
Mama I Want To Sing: The Soundtrack was released on January 18, 2011.

1. Tug of War | Deitrick Haddon
2. Walk Around Heaven | Patti LaBelle
3. I Will | Paris Bennett
4. Living Not in Vain | Fred Hammond feat. Smokie Norful
5. Mama, I Want to Sing! | Kierra Kiki Sheard
6. Be Grateful | Fred Hammond feat. Cynthia Simon
7. U Got Me Through | 21:03 feat. J Moss
8. For Me | B.R.I.G.G. feat. Eric Griggs
9. I'm Gonna Serve the Lord | Johnny B. Williams
10. Jus' 1 of Dem Days | Irocc Williams
11. Sick-n-Tired | Karen Clark Sheard feat. Kierra Kiki Sheard
12. Not Created to Fall | Desiree Coleman

== See also ==
- List of black films of the 2010s
