= Mama, I Want to Sing! (musical) =

1983 musical

- Music: Rudolph V. Hawkins, Wesley Naylor and Doris Troy
- Lyrics: Vy Higginsen; Ken Wydro
- Book: Vy Higginsen; Ken Wydro
- Setting: Harlem, New York,1940s-50s
- Basis: Life story of Doris Troy
- Premiere: 23 March 1983, Heckscher Theatre, NYC
- Productions: Mama, I Want to Sing; 1983: Heckscher Theatre; 1986: America; 1987: Europe; 1988: Japan; 1994: Japan (revival); 1995: Cambridge Theatre (later Gielgud Theatre); 2002: Bermuda, West Indies; Mama, I Want to Sing, Part II; 1990: Heckscher Theatre; 1991: Japan; Mama, I Want to Sing, The Whole Story; 1992: Japan (tour)

Mama, I Want to Sing! is a 1983 musical based on the life and times of African-American singer Doris Troy.

== Production ==
As a tribute to many of the African-American stars' rise to fame in the 1960 and 1970s, Vy Higginsen based her musical on the life of her sister Doris Troy. Troy's 1963 hit "Just One Look" launched her to international fame and a successful career in London, although her roots were in her church choir. This is not unlike the rise of other R&B and jazz singers such as Aretha Franklin, Patti LaBelle and Donna Summer. Vy Higginsen and Ken Wydro, her husband, conceived the play in January 1979 and subsequently wrote the book and lyrics. The musical, however, was rejected by every major producer in New York. The lack of interest was largely due to the doubtfulness that a large enough audience would be attracted to a gospel-based production. The couple persisted without a producer, and invested their life-savings to hire out the 632-seat Heckscher Theatre in East Harlem, which had previously been closed for 15 years. Vy envisioned her audience as being "senior citizens, church groups, school children, and hard-working black mothers and fathers who had spiritual values and loved soul-stirring music."

Mama, I Want to Sing! opened on March 23, 1983, on a very tight budget; however, word of mouth throughout the black community spread the news about the work. Audiences flocked to see the musical, which "presented the passion, spontaneity and emotional uplift of the black church experience along with a universal message for anyone with a dream." Currently, Mama, I Want to Sing! has played 2,500 performances in New York and another 1,000 performances throughout the United States, Europe, and Japan. It has been performed in front of thousands of people, and is the longest running black off-Broadway musical in American history. On January 7, 1985, Time magazine named Mama, I Want to Sing! one of the ten "Best of '84" theater performances. On January 20, 1986, the show hit its 1000th performance milestone. On February 1–6, 1994, Mama, I Want to Sing! played to 40,000 at the Paramount Theater at Madison Square Garden. In 2003–04, Mama, I Want to Sing! celebrated its 20th anniversary at the Williams Institute C.M.E. Baptist Church in Harlem, formerly the Lafayette Theater. 2011 saw the release of the long-awaited premiere of the film adaptation of the musical by 20th Century Fox.

The Encyclopedia of Popular Music noted that, within four years of its 1983 debut, the musical drew an audience of more than 3 million spectators and had grossed £38 million ($62.3 million), equivalent to more than $172 million adjusted for inflation.

== Cast and crew ==
Various actors and actresses have played the roles of the different parts over the years:

=== Doris Winter ===
- Crystal Johnson (singer) 1983
- Tisha Campbell 1983
- Desiree Coleman 1983-85
- Lynda McConnell 1984
- Octavia Lambertis 1984
- Hedreich Guillory 1985-86
- D. K. Dyson 1985
- Catina Boswell (Auditioned)1986
- D'atra Hicks 1986-90
- Ramona Keller 1985-88
- Adrienne Brand 1986-90
- Noreen Crayton 1985-90
- Sharlene Nelson 1989
- Stacy Francis 1992-96
- Lisa Fischer 1996-97
- Kim Summerson 1994
- Ahmaya Knoelle 2004–present

=== Musical Director ===
- Wesley Naylor
- Rudolph Hawkins
- Steve Taylor
- Kevin Mckoy
- Gregory Kelly 2003– Present
- James I. Johnson

=== Mama Winter ===
- Queen Esther Marrow 1983–84
- Doris Troy 1984-2000
- Betina Pennon-Dowtin 2011
- Dejahnee Richardson 1992–93
- Shirley Caesar 1994–96
- LeJuene Thompson 2004

=== Minister of Music ===
- Steven Williams 1983–85
- Charles Stewart 1985–90
- Pierre Cook 1990-2000
- Dejahnee Richardson 1998-2000
- Darryl JoVan 2004
- Elijah Ahmad Lewis 2011–present

=== Reverend Winter ===
- Randy Higginson 1983-1988
- Alexander Plummer, Jr. 1984–88, 2004
- Ronald Grant 1989
- Tyrone Flowers 1992–96
- Craig Wiggins 1995-2004
- Tyrone Flowers 2011

=== Sister Carrie ===
- Peggie Blue 1983
- Carolyn Dennis 1983–84
- Trina Thomas 1985
- Kathleen Murphy-Jackson 1986-2004
- Kellie Evans 1986–88
- Altrinna Grayson 1986–88
- Dejahnee Richardson 1993–95
- Chaka Khan 1995
- Deniece Williams 1996
- Sandra Huff 2011

=== Stage Manager ===
- Troy Naquan Busby 2011
- Otis White 1986-1989
- Marlon Campbell 1993-2004

=== Key Makeup Artist ===
- Orlané "Starr" Benau 2011

=== Wardrobe Mistress (crew member) ===
- Theresa Morris 1984-2003
- Theda Dennis 2011–present

=== Lighting Designer ===
- Sandra Ross
- Earl

=== Production Electrician ===
- Marvin Watkins 1984–85
- Antoinette Tynes 1985–88

=== Sound Engineer ===
- Brian Young 1985–87
- Don Juan Holder 1986–89

=== Stage Crew ===
- Freeman Hawes
- Frank Hawes
- Melody Beal

=== Musicians ===
- Rudolph Hawkins
- Wesley Naylor
- Fred Wells (Guitar)
- Barry Vincent (Guitar) 1985-86
- Al McDowell (Bass)
- Gregory Kelly (keys 1 & 2)
- Justin Lesley (Drums) 2003-11
- Kevin McKoy (keys 1 & 2)
- David McKoy (Drums) 2011
- Andre Cleghorn (Bass) 2000-13
- Evan Rainey (Bass) 2009-11
- Al Carty (Bass) 2003-05
- Robert Bennix (keys 2) 2003-05
- James I. Johnson (Keys) 1986-91 (Road Tour & Home)

== Sequels/adaptions ==
=== Mama, I Want to Sing: Part II ===
Mama, I Want to Sing: Part II follows the courtship, marriage, and birth of the first child of superstar Doris Winter and her husband, Rev. Julian Simmons. In the spring of 1990, Mama, I Want to Sing, Part II opened at the Heckscher Theatre playing in repertory with the original play.

The musical was given an overall positive review from Stephen Holden of The New York Times, saying: "The sequel's romance lends the sequel a warmth and sexiness that the original show lacked." Although the review continued to say, "The dialogue and line readings sometimes go completely flat." Holden added: "But in an odd way, the show's weaknesses seem inseparable from its strengths." He concluded by saying, "To attend either production of Mama with a typical audience made up largely of church groups, some of which have traveled hundreds of miles by chartered bus to be there, is to be indelibly reminded of the enduring power of that tradition."

=== Born to Sing ===
Born to Sing, the finale to the trilogy reveals the behind–the-scenes activities of Doris Winter's international tour along with her 15-year-old daughter.

=== Mama, I Want to Sing, The Whole Story ===
In the autumn of 1992, Mama, I Want to Sing, The Whole Story, a combination show featuring the storylines and music from both the shows, premiered in a 10-week tour in Japan.

=== Mama, I Want to Sing: The Movie ===
The 2011 adaptation of Mama, I Want to Sing! is inspired by the stage play and features brand new music. The story revolves around Amara Winter who enters the pop music scene, causing conflict with her mother. She learns to pursue her dreams while both navigating the often treacherous celebrity world and trying to remain true to herself and her family. The film stars Ciara, Lynn Whitfield, Patti LaBelle, Billy Zane, Juanita Bynum, Hill Harper, and Vy and Ken's daughter, Ahmaya Knoelle. Vy Higginsen plays herself in a cameo role.
