= Vy Higginsen =

American dramatist

- Born: New York City
- Education: Fashion Institute of Technology
- Occupation: Producer • playwright
- Organization: Mama Foundation for the Arts
- Spouse: Ken Wydro
- Website: vy-higginsen.com

Vy Higginsen is an American theater producer, playwright, former disc jockey, and radio and television personality. She is the founder and executive director of the Mama Foundation for the Arts, and the co-writer and co-producer of the 1983 musical Mama, I Want to Sing!, the longest running Black off-Broadway musical in American history.

== Early life and education ==
Higginsen grew up in Bronx, New York City in a musical family; her parents, sister, and grandmother all sang. Her father was a Pentecostal minister. When her sister, singer Doris Troy, won Amateur Night at the Apollo Theater and began touring, Higginsen came along with her. Higginsen graduated from the Fashion Institute of Technology.

== Career ==
Higginsen became the first female advertising executive at Ebony magazine. She later worked as a contributing editor for Essence, then published and edited her own magazine, Unique NY.

Higginsen moved on to work in radio for ten years, hosting shows on WBLS and WWRL, and reporting for WNBC-TV and The Metro Channel.

In 1983, Higginsen co-wrote and co-produced the musical Mama, I Want to Sing! with her husband-to-be, Ken Wydro. The play was based on the life of her sister, Doris Troy. The show opened at the Heckscher Theater in Harlem in 1983 and ran there for eight years, becoming the longest-running off-Broadway Black musical in history. Higginsen played the role of the narrator in the musical. Her brother, Randy, and sister Doris also appeared in Mama. The play was made into a film of the same name, in which Higginsen also appeared along with her daughter, Knoelle.

Higginsen and Wydro wrote and produced two sequels to the successful musical: Sing, Mama 2 and Born to Sing: Mama 3. They also wrote and produced the musical Alive: 55+ and Kickin', which was featured on the newsmagazine 60 Minutes in 2015.

In 1999, Higginsen founded the Mama Foundation for the Arts, a non-profit arts organization in Harlem. In 2006, she created Gospel for Teens, offering free gospel music instruction to teenagers through the foundation. The program was featured on 60 Minutes, in a show that won two Emmy Awards in 2012. The show had previously featured a segment on Higginsen tracing her ancestry, and learning that she was genetically linked with a white cattle rancher from Missouri.

In 2012, Higginsen founded Harlem Records, an independent record label.

== Selected awards and recognition ==
- 1988 – Candace Award, Business
- 2012 – 'Shine A Light' recognition, BET Awards
- 2012 – Thomas A. Dorsey Most Notable Achievement Award, Stellar Gospel Music Awards
