= Keith Mallett =

American artist

- Born: October 7, 1948 (age 76); Roaring Spring, Pennsylvania, U.S.
- Known for: Painting, Etching, Ceramics
- Spouse: Dianne Mallett
- Website: http://www.keithmallett.com/

Keith Duncan Mallett (born October 7, 1948) is an American artist who has worked as a painter, etcher and ceramic artist. His subject matter ranges from figurative to still life and abstracts. Mallett's work has been exhibited worldwide and is featured in corporate and private collections. He has also enjoyed considerable success with numerous sold-out limited-edition prints, and was given the commission to craft the official limited-edition print commemorating the 50th anniversary of Jackie Robinson's breakthrough into major league baseball.

== Biography ==
=== Early life ===
Mallett was born in Roaring Spring, Pennsylvania. His father Boyd Mallett was a veteran of World War II and was an engineer and electrician who died of a heart attack at the age of 33. Mallett was six at the time of his father's death. His mother, Dorothy Williams raised Keith, his two brothers Jason and Ronald Mallett, and his sister Eve, alone. At twelve Mallett began painting as a hobby.

=== Career ===
Keith studied painting at the Art Students League and Hunter College in New York City. Both stints at college led his professors to encourage him to work professionally and he gained positions working for several of his professors. While in New York, Mallett began working for the music industry painting record covers for Virgin Records and creating T-shirts for several well-known music groups.

In 1980 he moved to Los Angeles to continue pursuing his art career. In Los Angeles he began working for Jam Power Records and began to exhibit his work in numerous galleries. Soon after moving to Los Angeles he moved to San Diego to work with Front Line Graphics. He soon began to concentrate on painting fine art and African American art. With the worldwide success of "Generations", Mallett started his own company Keith Mallett Studio Inc.

A partial list of Keith’s clients include: Random House, Lenox China, Franklin Mint, New York Graphic Society, Springs Industries, Icon Shoes and Canadian Art Prints.

=== Movies, television and books ===
A variety of movies and television shows have featured Mallett's work, including Woody Allen's Mighty Aphrodite, Soul Food, Ben Affleck's Gone Baby Gone, and Disney Channel's The Famous Jett Jackson. His art has also been featured in books such as Charlotte Watson Sherman's Sister Fire, Jonah Winter's How Jelly Roll Morton Invented Jazz, and Ray Anthony Shepard's Runaway: The Daring Escape of Ona Judge, and has been featured on the covers of Chicken Soup for the African American Soul and Chicken Soup for the African American Woman's Soul.

== Personal life ==
Mallett currently lives in San Diego with his wife Dianne. They have one son, Christopher, a classical guitarist studying at Yale University.
