= Rachel Renée Russell =

American author (born 1959)

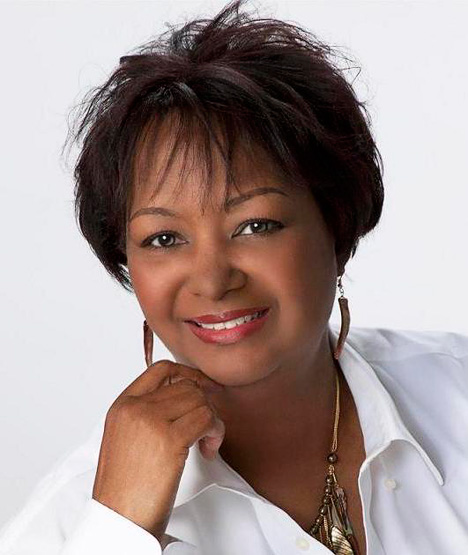
- Born: March 13, 1959 (age 67)
- Occupations: Author, cartoonist, attorney
- Children: 2

Rachel Renée Russell (born March 13, 1959) is an American author of the children's book series Dork Diaries and its spin-off The Misadventures of Max Crumbly.

Russell grew up in Saint Joseph, Michigan, and has four younger siblings, two sisters and twin brothers. She attended Northwestern University, then law school. As of 2013, she lives in Chantilly, Virginia.

Dork Diaries, written in a diary format, uses doodles, drawings, and comic strips to chronicle the daily life of the main character, Nikki Maxwell, as she struggles to fit in and survive middle school. The series is based on Russell's middle school experiences. Her daughter, Nikki, is the illustrator of the series. The main character, Nikki Maxwell, is named after her daughter.

The Misadventures of Max Crumbly is about a character, Maxwell Crumbly, who keeps a diary about his challenges in middle school. He is introduced in Dork Diaries: Tales From A Not-So Perfect Pet Sitter.

As of December 2025, Dork Diaries has sold over 55 million copies worldwide in 52 countries and 45 languages. It has been on the New York Times Best Sellers list in the Children's Series category for 336 weeks.

== Bibliography and awards ==
- Dork Diaries: Tales From a Not-So-Fabulous Life (Book 1) was released on June 2, 2009. It spent 42 weeks on the New York Times bestsellers list and 7 weeks on the USA Today bestsellers list.
- Dork Diaries: Tales From a Not-So-Popular Party Girl (Book 2) was released on June 8, 2010. It spent 42 weeks on the New York Times bestsellers list and 13 weeks on the USA Today Best Sellers list.
- Dork Diaries: Tales From a Not-So Talented Pop Star (Book 3) was released on June 7, 2011 and landed on the New York Times bestsellers list for Children's Series.
- Dork Diaries: How To Dork Your Diary was released in October 2011 and landed on the New York Times bestsellers list for Children's Series.
- Dork Diaries: Tales From a Not-So-Graceful Ice Princess (Book 4) was released in June 2012 and landed on the New York Times bestsellers list for Children's Series. It also won the 2013 Children's Choice Book of the Year Award for the 5th/6th grade division.
- Dork Diaries: Tales From a Not-So-Smart Miss Know-It-All (Book 5) was released in October 2012. It also landed on the New York Times bestsellers list for Children's Series.
- Dork Diaries: Tales From a Not-So-Happy Heartbreaker (Book 6) was released on June 4, 2013, and landed on the New York Times bestsellers list for Children's Series.
- Dork Diaries: OMG! All About Me Diary! was released on October 8, 2013, and landed on the New York Times bestsellers list for Children's Series.
- Dork Diaries: Tales From a Not-So-Glam TV Star (Book 7) was released on June 3, 2014, and landed on the New York Times bestsellers list for Children's Series.
- Dork Diaries: Tales From a Not-So-Happily Ever After (Book 8) was released on September 30, 2014, and landed on the New York Times bestsellers list for Children's Series.
- Dork Diaries: Tales From a Not-So-Dorky Drama Queen (Book 9) was released on June 2, 2015, and landed on the New York Times bestsellers list for Children's Series.
- Dork Diaries: Tales From a Not-So-Perfect Pet Sitter (Book 10) was released on October 20, 2015, and landed on the New York Times bestsellers list for Children's Series.
- The Misadventures of Max Crumbly: Locker Hero (Book 1) was released on June 7, 2016, and landed on the New York Times bestsellers list.
- Dork Diaries: Tales from a Not-So-Friendly Frenemy (Book 11) was released on October 18, 2016, and landed on the New York Times bestsellers list for Children's Series.
- The Misadventures of Max Crumbly: Middle School Mayhem (Book 2) was released on June 16, 2017, and landed on the New York Times bestsellers list.
- Dork Diaries: Tales from a Not-So-Secret Crush Catastrophe (Book 12) was released on October 17, 2017, and landed on the New York Times bestsellers list for Children's Series.
- Crumbly: Masters of Mischief (Book 3) was released on June 4, 2019, and landed on the New York Times bestsellers list for Children's Series.
- Dork Diaries: Tales From a Not-so-Happy Birthday (Book 13) was released on October 16, 2018, and landed on the New York Times bestsellers list for Children's Series.
- Dork Diaries: Tales From a Not-so-Best Friend Forever (Book 14) was released on October 22, 2019, and landed on the New York Times bestsellers list for Children's Series.
- Dork Diaries: Tales From a Not-So Posh Paris Adventure (Book 15) was released on September 24, 2023, and after several delays due to the COVID-19 pandemic it landed on the New York Times bestsellers list for Children's Series.
- Dork Diaries: Tales from a Not-So Bratty Little Sister (Book 16) was released on October 17, 2024, and landed on the New York Times bestsellers list for Children's Series.
- Dork Diaries: Tales From a Not-So Fabulous Life (Book 1 Full Color Edition) was released on November 18, 2025, and landed on the New York Times bestsellers list for Children's Series.

== Personal life ==
Russell was married to her college sweetheart until their divorce in April 2009. They shared two daughters, Erin and Nikki, who helped Russell write and illustrate her books. By 2013, she resided in Chantilly, Virginia.
