= Juanita Bynum =

American singer

- Born: January 16, 1959 (age 67); Chicago, Illinois, United States
- Genres: Gospel; worship
- Occupations: Musician, songwriter
- Years active: 1995–present
- Label: RCA
- Website: www.juanitabynum.com

Juanita Bynum (born January 16, 1959) is an American gospel singer, author, and pastor.

In 2006, she released an album titled Piece of My Passion, which reached No.55 in the Billboard 200 charts. The New York Times described her as "the most prominent black female television evangelist in the country". She is the author of The Threshing Floor.

== Discography ==
- Piece of My Passion (2006)
- Gospel Goes Classical (with Jonathan Butler) (2006)
- Morning Glory (2010)
- Pour my Love on you (2012)

== Bibliography ==
- — (1997). Don't Get Off the Train: En Route to Your Divine Destination. Pneuma Life Pub. ISBN 978-1-56229-121-1.
- — (1997). The Planted Seed: The Immutable Laws of Sowing and Reaping. Pneuma Life Pub. ISBN 978-1-56229-122-8.
- — (1998). No More Sheets: Devotional. Pneuma Life Pub. ISBN 978-1-56229-149-5.
- — (1998). No More Sheets: The Truth about Sex. Pneuma Life Pub. ISBN 978-1-56229-148-8.
- — (1999). Morning Glory: Meditation Scriptures. Morning Glory Series. Pneuma Life Publishing, Incorporated. ISBN 978-1-56229-158-7.
- — (2004). My Spiritual Inheritance. Charisma House. ISBN 978-1-59185-644-3.
- — (2006). Heart Matters: Loving God the Way He Loves You. Charisma Media. ISBN 978-1-59979-058-9.
- — (2010). No More Sheets: Starting Over. Destiny Image Publishers. ISBN 978-0-7684-3284-8.
- — (2011). 40 Days to Starting Over: No More Sheets Challenge. Destiny Image, Incorporated. ISBN 978-0-7684-9054-1.
- — (2017). The Juanita Bynum Topical Bible. CreateSpace Independent Publishing Platform. ISBN 978-1-5431-9887-4.
