= Raymond Obstfeld =

American writer

- Born: January 22, 1952 (age 74); Williamsport, Pennsylvania, U.S.
- Education: Lycoming College; University of California, Santa Barbara; University of California, Davis
- Occupations: Writer; professor

Raymond Obstfeld (born January 22, 1952) is an American writer of poetry, non-fiction, fiction, and screenplays as well as a professor of English at Orange Coast College.

He was born in Williamsport, Pennsylvania on January 22, 1952, and graduated from Loyalsock High School in 1969. His parents and older brother, Roland (b. 1947), were immigrants from Germany. His parents owned and operated Obstfeld's Jewish Delicatessen, which was the target of various hate crimes during Obstfeld's youth, from Nazi swastikas painted on the doors to arson, which gutted the building. His parents rebuilt the store, but these events informed Obstfeld's later political activism as well as his writing.

After a year at the local Lycoming College, Obstfeld attended an experimental college in Redlands, California, (now the Johnston Center at the University of Redlands) from which he graduated in 1972. He then attended the University of California, Santa Barbara for a year, but left to pursue his writing. After a year living in San Francisco working odd jobs, he finished his first novel and got an agent.

In 1974, he returned to graduate school at the University of California, Davis, where he studied poetry under the famed poet Karl Shapiro. After graduating in 1976, he began teaching English at Orange Coast College at the age of 24, where he still teaches today. He has said that when he started teaching he intended to quit as soon as his writing career took off. However, in his first year of teaching he sold his first book of poetry as well as his first novel, with a contract for three additional novels. He decided that he actually loved teaching more than writing and could not give it up.

== Writing career ==
Obstfeld has authored or co-authored nearly 50 books. Since 2007, he has been co-author to eight books with NBA basketball legend, Kareem Abdul-Jabbar. Obstfeld has twice been nominated for the NAACP Image Award, having won once. He has also been nominated for an Edgar Award from the Mystery Writers of America for Dead Heat. His young adult novel, The Joker and the Thief, won a Delacorte Young Adult Award.

Early in his writing career, Obstfeld wrote under several pseudonyms (Pike Bishop, Carl Stevens, Jason Frost) because he wrote different genres. After writing over a dozen thrillers, Westerns, and occult novels, he decided to return to mainstream literary fiction that he had written in graduate school. Because he had already achieved some fame as a mystery writer, he decided to write his new novel under the name Laramie Dunaway. The novel, Hungry Women, was written from the points of view of four women friends. It was published by Warner Books without anyone at the publishing house knowing Obstfeld was a man. The novel went on to great success, being published internationally. Laramie Dunaway published two more novels before informing Warner of his gender. The publisher decided to publish Obstfeld's next novel, Earth Angel, under his real name.

As a screenwriter, Obstfeld has written and sold numerous scripts that have been optioned or sold, though only one has actually been filmed, Whatever It Takes (1999) starring Don “The Dragon” Wilson.

In 2018, he joined the writing staff for the upcoming Veronica Mars revival series.

== Bibliography ==
• The Cat with Half a Face (Leyman & Johnson Press, 1978)

• The Goulden Fleece (Charter Books, 1979)

• Dead-End Option (Charter Books, 1980)

• Dead Heat (Charter Books, 1981)

• Dead Bolt (Charter Books, 1982)

• Mack Bolan: Bloodsport (Executioner, book 46), writing as Don Pendleton (Harlequin, 1982)

• Mack Bolan: Flesh Wounds (Executioner, book 57), writing as Don Pendleton (Harlequin Books, 1983)

• Judgment at Poisoned Well, writing as Pike Bishop (Pinnacle Books, 1983)

• The Dagger Series, book 1: The Centaur Conspiracy, writing as Carl Stevens (Harlequin Enterprises, 1983)

• The Warlord, writing as Jason Frost (Zebra, 1983)

• Dagger Series, book 2: Ride of the Razorback, writing as Carl Stevens (Harlequin Enterprises, 1984)

• The Warlord #2: The Cutthroat, writing as Jason Frost (Zebra, 1984)

• The Warlord #3: Badland, writing as Jason Frost (Zebra, 1984)

• The Warlord #4: Prisonland, writing as Jason Frost (Zebra, 1985)

• The Warlord #5: Terminal Island, writing as Jason Frost (Zebra, 1985)

• The Remington Factor (Charter Books, 1985) reprinted Endeavor, 2017

• Invasion USA (Kensington Publishing Co., 1985)

• Mack Bolan: Savannah Swingsaw (Executioner, book 74), writing as Don Pendleton (Harlequin Books, 1985)

• Masked Dog (Gold Eagle, 1986)

• Mack Bolan: The Fire Eaters (Executioner, book 93), writing as Don Pendleton (Harlequin Books, 1986)

• Brain Wave (Berkley, 1987)

• The Remington Contract (Charter, 1988), reprinted Endeavor, 2017

• The Reincarnation of Reece Erikson (A Tom Doherty Associates Book, 1988)

• Hot Sand: The Beach Volleyball Handbook (Windmill Press, 1989). Co-authored with beach volleyball professional Jon Stevenson.

• Hungry Women, writing as Laramie Dunaway (Warner, 1990)

• Borrowed Lives, writing as Laramie Dunaway (Warner, 1993)

• The Joker and the Thief (Delacorte, 1993)

• Writer’s Digest Handbook of Novel Writing (Writer's Digest Books, 1993)

• Lessons in Survival writing as Laramie Dunaway (Warner, 1994)

• Earth Angel (Warner Books, 1995)

• Kinky Cats, Immortal Amoebas, and Nine-Armed Octopuses: Weird, Wild, and Wonderful Behaviors in the Animal World (HarperCollins, 1997)

• JabberRock (Henry Holt, 1997). Co-authored by Patricia Fitzgerald.

• Napoleon Bonaparte (Greenhaven Press, 2000)

• Novelist’s Essential Guide to Crafting Scenes (Writer's Digest Books, 2000)

• Fiction First Aid (Writer's Digest Books, 2001)

• Writer’s Reference Guide to Writing About Professions (Writer's Digest Books, 2002)

• The Renaissance (Lucent Books, 2002)

• Moby Dick (Lucent Books, 2003)

• Borrowed Lives (reprint by Iota Press, 2007)

• On the Shoulders of Giants: My Journey Through the Harlem Renaissance, with Kareem Abdul-Jabbar (Simon & Schuster, 2007)

• Anatomy Lesson (Iota Press, 2008)

• What Color Is My World? The Lost History of African American Inventors, with Kareem Abdul-Jabbar (Candlewick, 2012)

• Streetball Crew Book One Sasquatch in the Paint, with Kareem Abdul-Jabbar (Disney-Hyperion, 2013)

• Streetball Crew Book Two Stealing the Game, with Kareem Abdul-Jabbar (Disney-Hyperion, 2015)

• Mycroft Holmes and the Apocalypse Handbook, with Kareem Abdul-Jabbar (2017) (graphic novel)

• Writings on the Wall: Searching for a New Equality Beyond Black and White, with Kareem Abdul-Jabbar (Time, 2016)

• Coach Wooden and Me: Our 50-Year Friendship On and Off the Court. editorial advisor to Kareem Abdul-Jabbar (Grand Central, 2017)

• Becoming Kareem: Growing Up On and Off the Court, with Kareem Abdul-Jabbar (Little Brown Books, 2017)

== Awards ==
1992 - Delacorte Young Adult Novel Award for Joker and the Thief

1981 - Nominated for Edgar Allan Poe Award for Dead Heat

2013 - NAACP Image Award for What Color Is My World

2017 - Nominated NAACP Image Award for Becoming Kareem

== Personal life ==
Obstfeld married Loretta Obstfeld, an award-winning poet and English professor at Orange Coast College, in 1990. They have two children: Max (b. 1999) and Harper (b. 2002).
