= Coretta Scott King Award =

American literary award

- Awarded for: The most distinguished portrayal of African American experience in literature for children or teens
- Country: United States
- Presented by: Coretta Scott King Book Award Round Table, a round table of the American Library Association (ALA)
- First award: 1970
- Website: www.ala.org/awards/books-media/coretta-scott-king-book-awards

The Coretta Scott King Award is an annual award presented by the Coretta Scott King Book Award Round Table, part of the American Library Association (ALA). Named for Coretta Scott King, wife of Martin Luther King Jr., this award recognizes outstanding books for young adults and children by African Americans that reflect the African American experience. Awards are given both to authors and to illustrators for universal human values.

The first author award was given in 1970. In 1974, the award was expanded to honor illustrators as well as authors. Starting in 1978, runner-up Author Honor Books have been recognized. Recognition of runner-up Illustrator Honor Books began in 1981. In addition, the Coretta Scott King Awards committee has given the Virginia Hamilton Award for Lifetime Achievement, starting in 2010, and beginning in 1996 an occasional John Steptoe Award for New Talent.

Like the Newbery Medal and Caldecott Medal, the Coretta Scott King Awards have the potential to be used in classroom teaching and projects.

== History ==
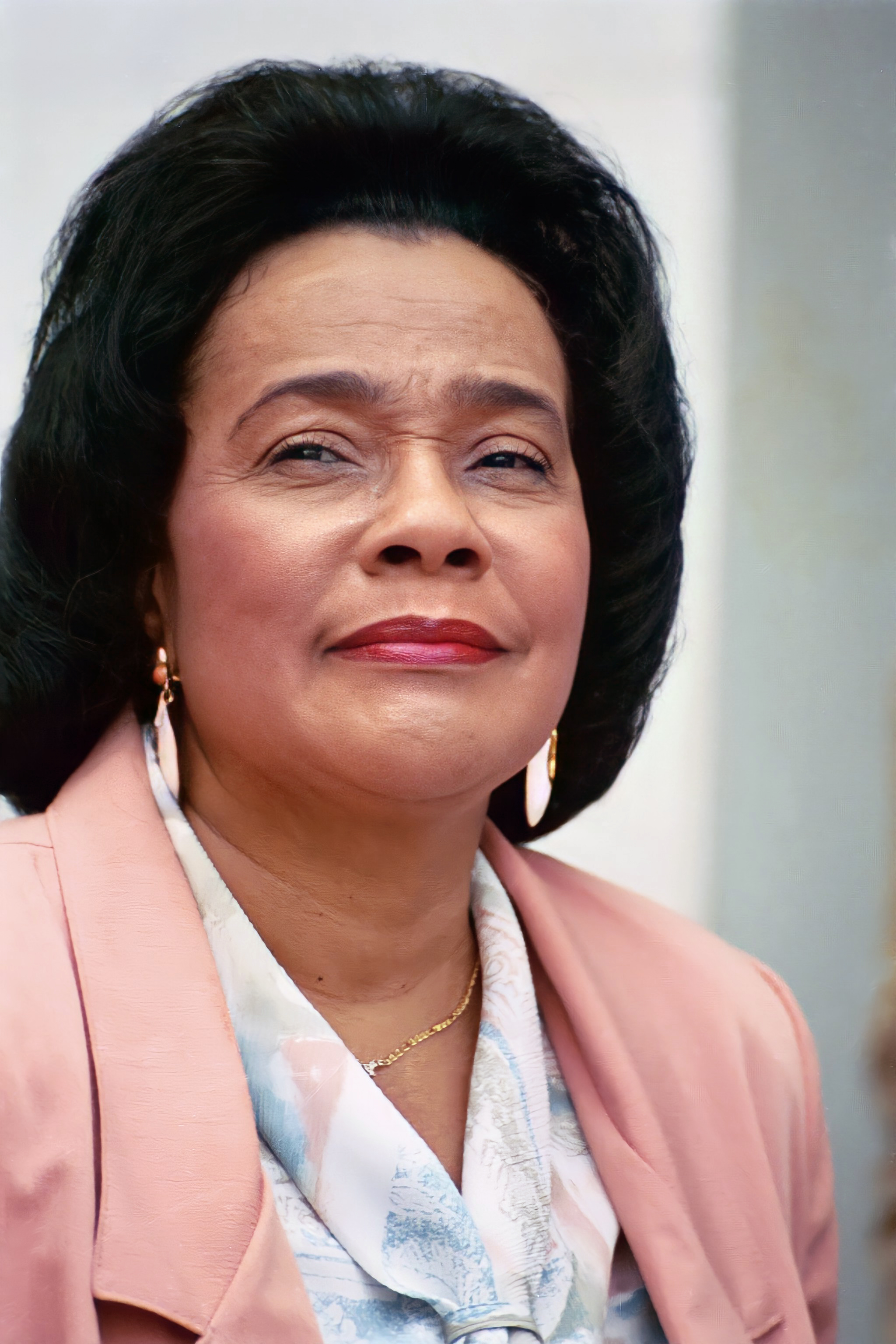
Scott King in 1993

The idea for the Coretta Scott King Award came from Glyndon Flynt Greer, a school librarian in Englewood, New Jersey. At a meeting of the American Library Association in Atlantic City in 1969, Greer, librarian Mabel McKissick, and publisher John M. Carroll, lamented the lack of recognition for minority writers. No person of color had won either the Newbery or Caldecott Medals at that time. Before the conference ended, a group of African American librarians had formed to promote the creation of a new award. Among them were Augusta Braxton Baker, Charlemae Hill Rollins, and Virginia Lacy Jones. The award's name was intentionally chosen to honor recently assassinated Martin Luther King Jr. and his wife, Coretta Scott King. The name also commemorates the life of King Jr. and honors the dedication Coretta Scott King had to making the world a place that welcomes all people. The first Coretta Scott King Award was presented to Lillie Patterson, a librarian in Baltimore, for her elementary level biography Martin Luther King, Jr.: Man of Peace.

Early sponsors of the award included the New Jersey Library Association, and the library councils of the Englewood Middle School and Dwight Morrow High School.With support from Roger McDonough, the third annual Coretta Scott King Award was presented during the American Library Association's 1972 Annual Conference in Chicago, Illinois. The award was briefly sponsored by the School of Library and Information Studies at Atlanta University from 1974 to 1976. In 1976, a separate awards committee and an advisory board of mostly local librarians were formed, co-chaired by Ella Gaines Yates.

In 1974, the award was expanded to honor illustrators as well as authors. The first illustrator to receive the award was George Ford, for his work in illustrating Ray Charles by Sharon Bell Mathis. Starting in 1978, the runner-ups for the author prize were listed as Honor Books, and beginning in 1981 the illustrator runner-ups were also listed as Honor Books.

In 1979, the awards committee and the advisory board merged, forming the Coretta Scott King Award Task Force. With support from E. J. Josey, the new committee became part of the Social Responsibilities Round Table (SRRT) of the American Library Association. Greer served as its first chair until her death on 24 August 1980. Harriet Brown then became acting chair. Brown was succeeded by Effie Lee Morris in 1981. Under Morris' leadership, the Coretta Scott King Awards were officially recognized by the executive board of the ALA. Morris wrote formal selection criteria for the awards to meet ALA's standards, and the Coretta Scott King Awards were accepted as an ALA unit award in 1982, the twelfth year that they had been given.

Winning books receive a medal; honor books receive a certificate. Winning and honor books are identified by the presence on their covers of the Coretta Scott King Award Seal. The original seal was designed by artist Lev Mills in 1974, with a bronze seal on winning books and a pewter seal on honor books. In a later revision of the seal, the colors changed to bronze and black for winners, and pewter and black for honors.

The award eventually changed its ALA affiliation from the SRRT to the Ethnic and Multicultural Information Exchange Round Table (EMIERT), which had previously been a task force of the SRRT and was a closer match for its activities. In 2022 The Coretta Scott King Book Award was designated an official ALA Round Table: the Coretta Scott King Book Awards Round Table.

Dr. Henrietta M. Smith edited four volumes, published by the American Library Association, that provide a history of the award. The Coretta Scott King Awards: 50th Anniversary was published in 2019 on the Award's 50th anniversary.

From 1996 on, the Coretta Scott King Awards program includes the John Steptoe Award for New Talent, optionally awarded to an author, an illustrator, or both.

== Recipients ==
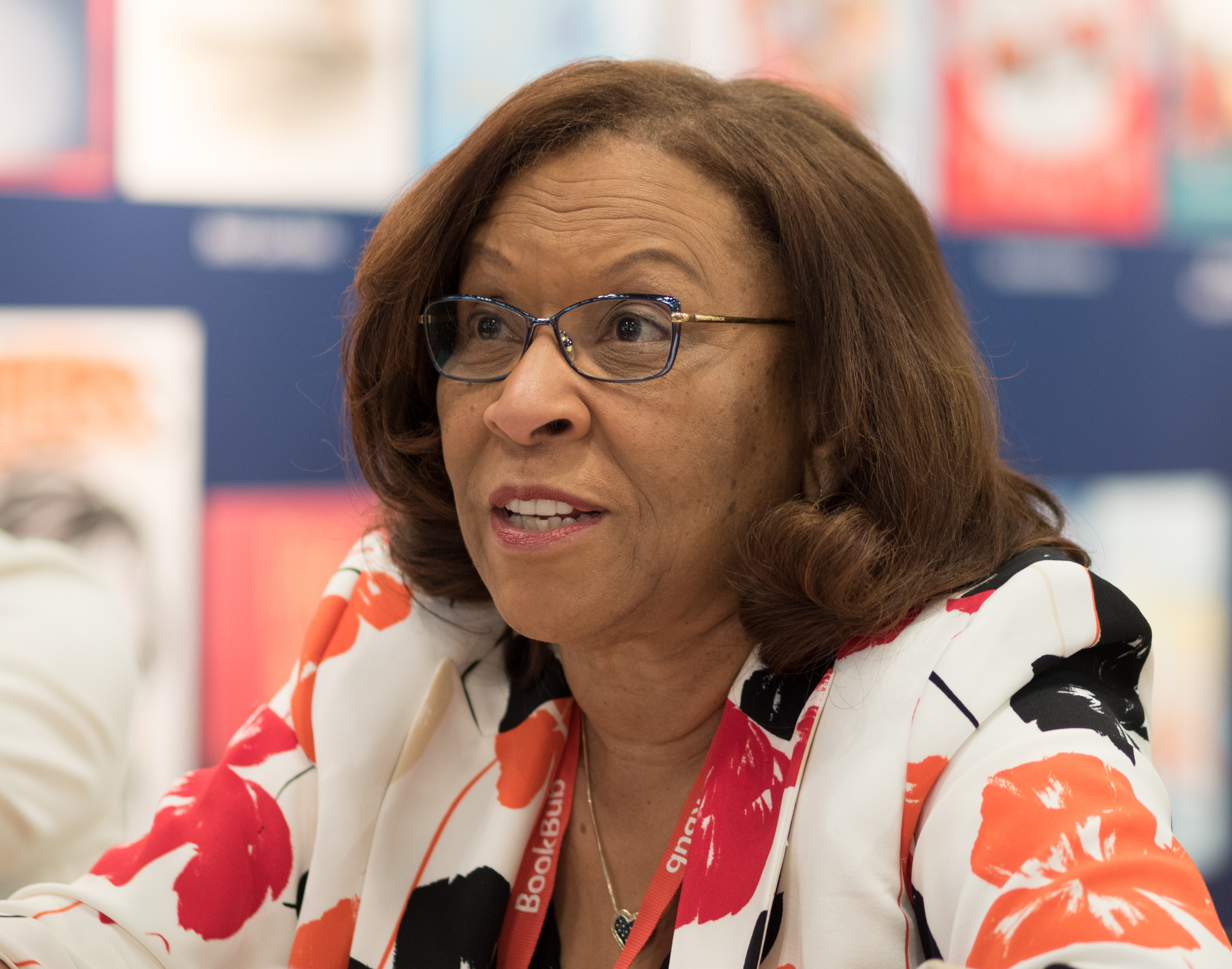
Sharon Draper won the Steptoe Award before going on to win two Coretta Scott King Awards

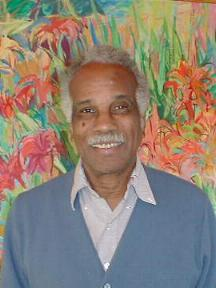
Ashley Bryan has won the award as both an author and illustrator and has been recognized 12 total times

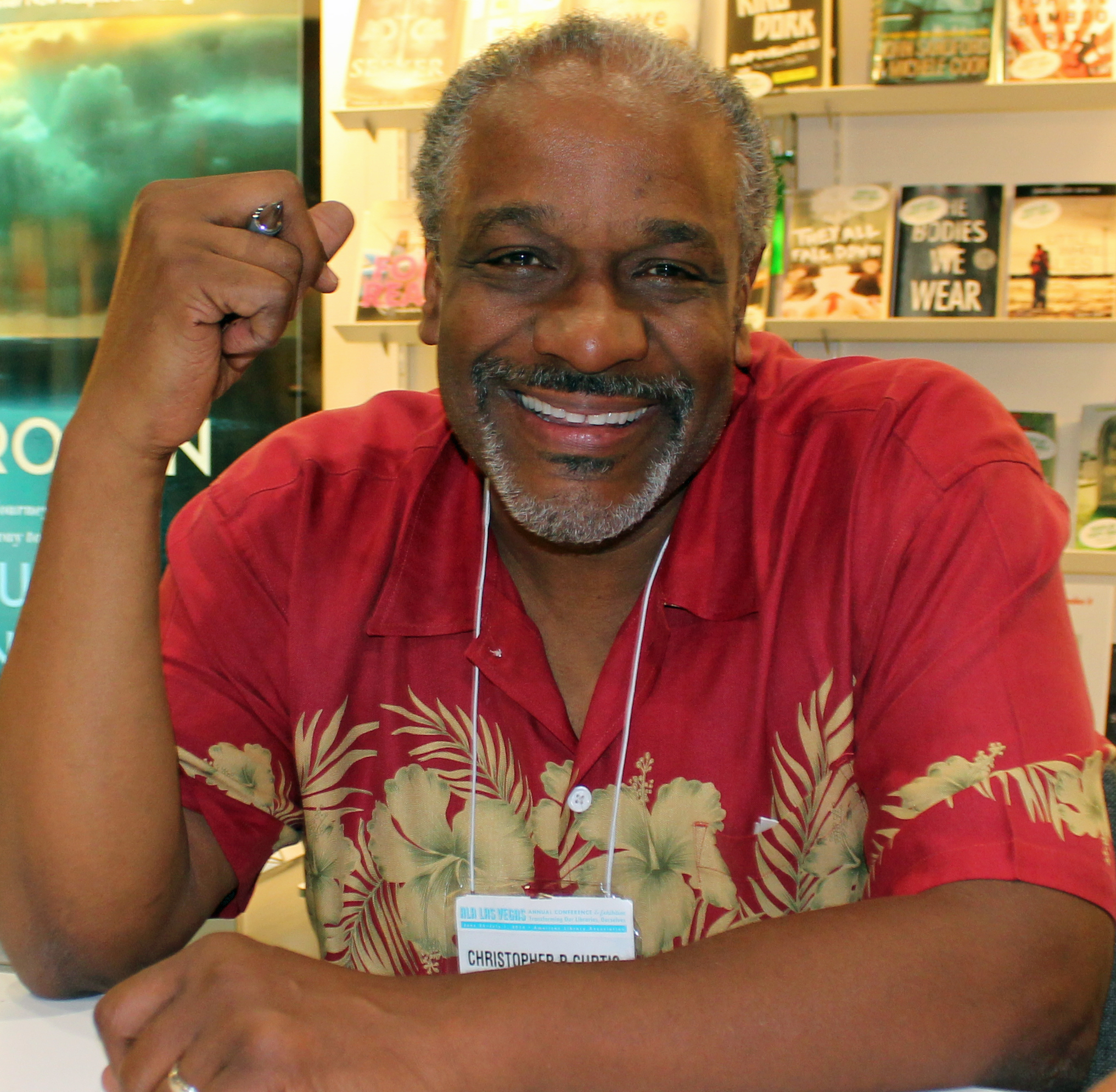
Christopher Paul Curtis became the first author to win the Newbery Medal and Coretta Scott King Award in the same year for Bud, Not Buddy.

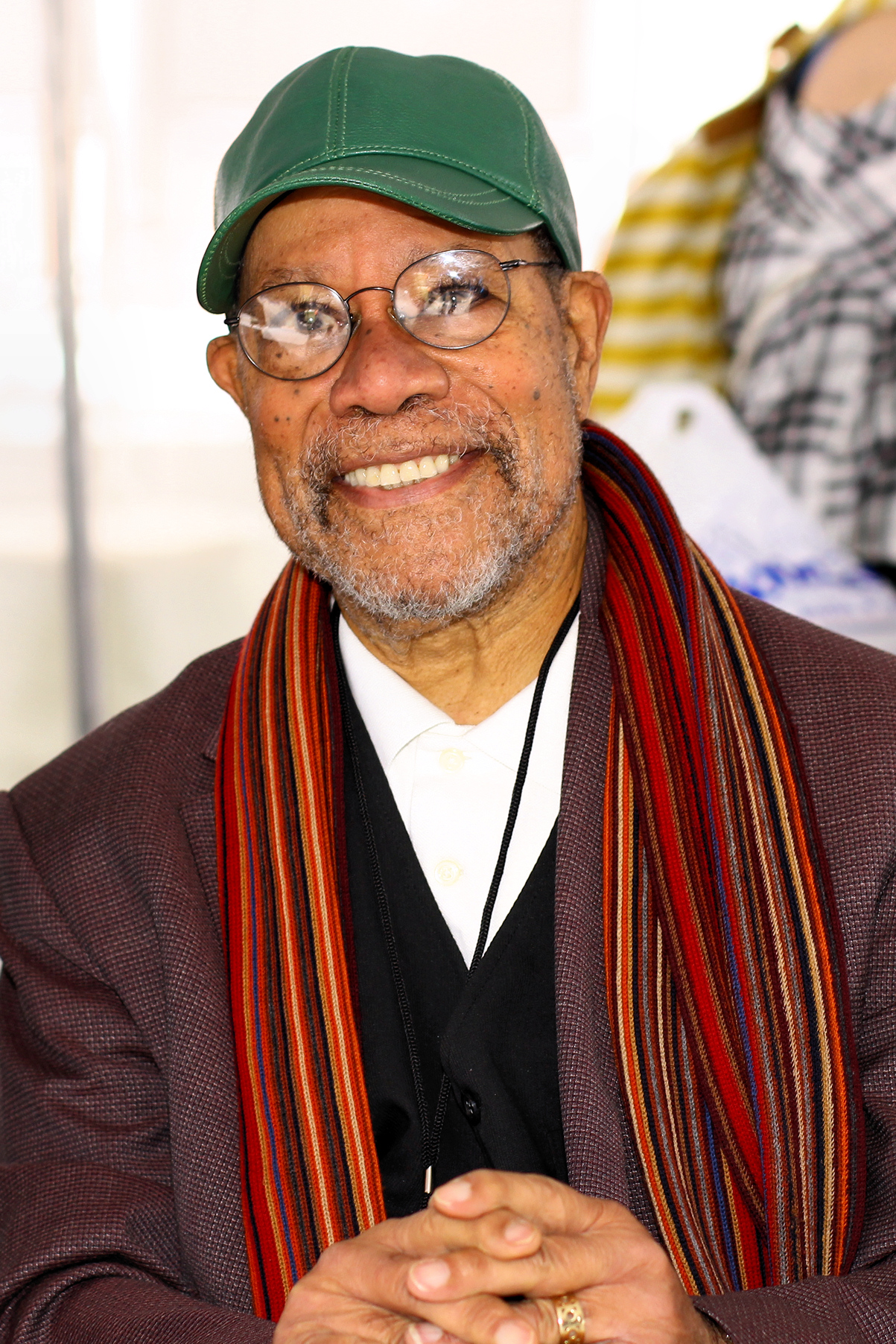
Jerry Pinkney's five wins are the most for any illustrator

Table key
Row color	Meaning
	Indicates a Coretta Scott King author winner
	Indicates a Coretta Scott King illustrator winner
	Indicates a John Steptoe Award for New Talent winner
	Indicates a special recognition

Coretta Scott King Book Awards winners and runners-up
Year	Work	Recipient	Title	Citation
1970	Author	Lillie Patterson	Martin Luther King Jr.: Man of Peace	Winner
1971	Author	Charlemae Rollins	Black Troubadour: Langston Hughes	Winner
1971	Author	Maya Angelou	I Know Why the Caged Bird Sings	Honor
1971	Author	Shirley Chisholm	Unbought and Unbossed	Honor
1971	Author	Mari Evans	I Am a Black Woman	Honor
1971	Author	Lorenz Graham	Every Man Heart Lay Down	Honor
1971	Author	June Jordan and Terri Bush	The Voice of the Children	Honor
1971	Author	Gladys Groom and Barney Grossman	Black Means	Honor
1971	Author	Margaret W. Peters	Ebony Book of Black Achievement	Honor
1971	Author	Janice May Udry	Mary Jo's Grandmother	Honor
1972	Author	Elton Fax	17 Black Artists	Winner
1973	Author	Alfred Duckett	I Never Had It Made: An Autobiography of Jackie Robinson	Winner
1974	Author	Sharon Bell Mathis	Ray Charles	Winner
1974	Author	Alice Childress	A Hero Ain't Nothin' But a Sandwich	Honor
1974	Author	Lucille Clifton	Don't You Remember?	Honor
1974	Author	Louise Crane	Ms. Africa: Profiles of Modern African Women	Honor
1974	Author	Kristin Hunter	Guest in the Promise Land	Honor
1974	Author	John Nagenda	Mukasa	Honor
1974	Illustrator	George Ford	Ray Charles	Winner
1975	Author	Dorothy Robinson	The Legend of Africania	Winner
1976	Author	Pearl Bailey	Duey's Tale	Winner
1976	Author	Shirley Graham	Julius K. Nyerere: Teacher of Africa	Honor
1976	Author	Eloise Greenfield	Paul Robeson	Honor
1976	Author	Walter Dean Myers	Fast Sam, Cool Clyde, and Stuff	Honor
1976	Author	Mildred Taylor	Song of the Trees	Honor
1977	Author	James Haskins	The Story of Stevie Wonder	Winner
1977	Author	Lucille Clifton	Everett Anderson's Friend	Honor
1977	Author	Mildred Taylor	Roll of Thunder, Hear my Cry	Honor
1977	Author	Clarence N. Blake and Donald F. Martin	Quiz Book on Black America	Honor
1978	Author	Eloise Greenfield	Africa Dream	Winner
1978	Author	William J. Faulkner	The Days When the Animals Talked: Black Folk Tales and How They Came to Be	Honor
1978	Author	Frankcina Glass	Marvin and Tige	Honor
1978	Author	Eloise Greenfield	Mary McLeod Bethune	Honor
1978	Author	James Haskins	Barbara Jordan	Honor
1978	Author	Lillie Patterson	Coretta Scott King	Honor
1978	Author	Ruth Ann Stewart	Portia: The Life of Portia Washington Pittman, the Daughter of Booker T. Washington	Honor
1978	Illustrator	Carole Byard	Africa Dream	Winner
1979	Author	Ossie Davis	Escape to Freedom	Winner
1979	Author	Lillie Patterson	Benjamin Banneker	Honor
1979	Author	Jeanne W. Peterson	I Have a Sister, My Sister is Deaf	Honor
1979	Author	Virginia Hamilton	Justice and Her Brothers	Honor
1979	Author	Carol Fenner	Skates of Uncle Richard	Honor
1979	Illustrator	Tom Feelings	Something on My Mind	Winner
1980	Author	Walter Dean Myers	The Young Landlords	Winner
1980	Author	Berry Gordy	Movin' Up	Honor
1980	Author	Eloise Greenfield and Lessie Jones Little	Childtimes: A Three-Generation Memoir	Honor
1980	Author	James Haskins	Andrew Young: Young Man with a Mission	Honor
1980	Author	James Haskins	James Van Der Zee: The Picture Takin' Man	Honor
1980	Author	Ellease Southerland	Let the Lion Eat Straw	Honor
1980	Illustrator	Carole Byard	Cornrows	Winner
1981	Author	Sidney Poitier	This Life	Winner
1981	Author	Alexis De Veaux	Don't Explain: A Song of Billie Holiday	Honor
1981	Illustrator	Ashley Bryan	Beat the Story Drum, Pum-Pum	Winner
1981	Illustrator	Carole Byard	Grandmama's Joy	Honor
1981	Illustrator	Jerry Pinkney	Count on Your Fingers African Style	Honor
1982	Author	Mildred Taylor	Let the Circle Be Unbroken	Winner
1982	Author	Alice Childress	Rainbow Jordan	Honor
1982	Author	Kristin Hunter	Lou In the Limelight	Honor
1982	Author	Mary E. Mebane	Mary: An Autobiography	Honor
1982	Illustrator	John Steptoe	Mother Crocodile: An Uncle Amadou Tale from Senegal	Winner
1982	Illustrator	Tom Feelings	Daydreamers	Honor
1983	Author	Virginia Hamilton	Sweet Whispers, Brother Rush	Winner
1983	Author	Julius Lester	This Strange New Feeling	Honor
1983	Illustrator	Peter Magubane	Black Child	Winner
1983	Illustrator	John Steptoe	All the Colors of the Race	Honor
1983	Illustrator	Ashley Bryan	I'm Going to Sing: Black American Spirituals	Honor
1983	Illustrator	Pat Cummings	Just Us Women	Honor
1984	Author	Lucille Clifton	Everett Anderson's Goodbye	Winner
1984	Author	Virginia Hamilton	The Magical Adventures of Pretty Pearl	Honor
1984	Author	James Haskins	Lena Horne	Honor
1984	Author	Joyce Carol Thomas	Bright Shadow	Honor
1984	Author	Mildred Pitts Walter	Because We Are	Honor
1984	Author	Coretta Scott King (editor)	The Words of Martin Luther King, Jr	Special
1984	Illustrator	Pat Cummings	My Mama Needs Me	Winner
1985	Author	Walter Dean Myers	Motown and Didi	Winner
1985	Author	Candy Dawson Boyd	Circle of Gold	Honor
1985	Author	Virginia Hamilton	A Little Love	Honor
1986	Author	Virginia Hamilton	The People Could Fly: American Black Folktales	Winner
1986	Author	Virginia Hamilton	Junius Over Far	Honor
1986	Author	Mildred Pitts Walter	Trouble's Child	Honor
1986	Illustrator	Jerry Pinkney	The Patchwork Quilt	Winner
1986	Illustrator	Leo and Diane Dillon	The People Could Fly: American Black Folktales	Honor
1987	Author	Mildred Pitts Walter	Justin and the Best Biscuits in the World	Winner
1987	Author	Ashley Bryan	Lion and the Ostrich Chicks and Other African Folk Tales	Honor
1987	Author	Joyce Hansen	Which Way Freedom	Honor
1987	Illustrator	Jerry Pinkney	Half a Moon and One Whole Star	Winner
1987	Illustrator	Ashley Bryan	Lion and the Ostrich Chicks and Other African Folk Tales	Honor
1987	Illustrator	Pat Cummings	C.L.O.U.D.S.	Honor
1988	Author	Mildred Taylor	The Friendship	Winner
1988	Author	Alexis De Veaux	An Enchanted Hair Tale	Honor
1988	Author	Julius Lester	The Tales of Uncle Remus: The Adventures of Brer Rabbit	Honor
1988	Illustrator	John Steptoe	Mufaro's Beautiful Daughters: An African Tale	Winner
1988	Illustrator	Ashley Bryan	What a Morning! The Christmas Story in Black Spirituals	Honor
1988	Illustrator	Joe Sam	The Invisible Hunters: A Legend from the Miskito Indians of Nicaragua	Honor
1989	Author	Walter Dean Myers	Fallen Angels	Winner
1989	Author	James Berry	A Thief in the Village and Other Stories	Honor
1989	Author	Virginia Hamilton	Anthony Burns: The Defeat and Triumph of a Fugitive Slave	Honor
1989	Illustrator	Jerry Pinkney	Mirandy and Brother Wind	Winner
1989	Illustrator	Amos Ferguson	Under the Sunday Tree	Honor
1989	Illustrator	Pat Cummings	Storm in the Night	Honor
1990	Author	Patricia C. and Fredrick L. McKissack	A Long Hard Journey: The Story of the Pullman Porter	Winner
1990	Author	Eloise Greenfield	Nathaniel Talking	Honor
1990	Author	Virginia Hamilton	The Bells of Christmas	Honor
1990	Author	Lillie Patterson	Martin Luther King, Jr., and the Freedom Movement	Honor
1990	Illustrator	Jan Spivey Gilchrist	Nathaniel Talking	Winner
1990	Illustrator	Jerry Pinkney	The Talking Eggs: A Folktale from the American South	Honor
1991	Author	Mildred Taylor	The Road to Memphis	Winner
1991	Author	James Haskins	Black Dance in America	Honor
1991	Author	Angela Johnson	When I Am Old with You	Honor
1991	Illustrator	Leo and Diane Dillon	Aida	Winner
1992	Author	Walter Dean Myers	Now is Your Time: The African American Struggle for Freedom	Winner
1992	Author	Eloise Greenfield	Night on Neighborhood Street	Honor
1992	Illustrator	Faith Ringgold	Tar Beach	Winner
1992	Illustrator	Ashley Bryan	All Night, All Day: A Child's First Book of African American Spirituals	Honor
1992	Illustrator	Jan Spivey Gilchrist	Night on Neighborhood Street	Honor
1993	Author	Patricia C. McKissack	The Dark-Thirty: Southern Tales of the Supernatural	Winner
1993	Author	Patricia C. and Fredrick L. McKissack	Sojourner Truth: Ain't I a Woman?	Honor
1993	Author	Walter Dean Myers	Somewhere in the Darkness	Honor
1993	Author	Mildred Pitts Walter	Mississippi Challenge	Honor
1993	Illustrator	Kathleen Atkins Wilson	The Origin of Life on Earth: An African Creation Myth	Winner
1993	Illustrator	Wil Clay	Little Eight John	Honor
1993	Illustrator	Brian Pinkney	Sukey and the Mermaid	Honor
1993	Illustrator	Carole Byard	Working Cotton	Honor
1994	Author	Angela Johnson	Toning the Sweep	Winner
1994	Author	Joyce Carol Thomas	Brown Honey in Broomwheat Tea	Honor
1994	Author	Walter Dean Myers	Malcolm X: By Any Means Necessary	Honor
1994	Illustrator	Tom Feelings	Soul Looks Back in Wonder	Winner
1994	Illustrator	Floyd Cooper	Brown Honey in Broom Wheat Tea	Honor
1994	Illustrator	James Ransome	Uncle Jed's Barbershop	Honor
1995	Author	Patricia C. and Fredrick L. McKissack	Christmas in the Big House, Christmas in the Quarters	Winner
1995	Author	Joyce Hansen	The Captive	Honor
1995	Author	Jacqueline Woodson	I Hadn't Meant to Tell You This	Honor
1995	Author	Patricia C. and Fredrick L. McKissack, Jr.	Black Diamond: The Story of the Negro Baseball Leagues	Honor
1995	Illustrator	James Ransome	The Creation	Winner
1995	Illustrator	Teresa Shaffer	The Singing Man	Honor
1995	Illustrator	Floyd Cooper	Meet Danitra Brown	Honor
1995	Steptoe author	Sharon Draper	Tears of a Tiger	Winner
1996	Author	Virginia Hamilton	Her Stories: African American Folktales, Fairy Tales, and True Tales	Winner
1996	Author	Christopher Paul Curtis	The Watsons Go to Birmingham - 1963	Honor
1996	Author	Rita Williams-Garcia	Like Sisters on the Homefront	Honor
1996	Author	Jacqueline Woodson	From the Notebooks of Melanin Sun	Honor
1996	Illustrator	Tom Feelings	The Middle Passage	Winner
1996	Illustrator	Leo and Diane Dillon	Her Stories	Honor
1996	Illustrator	Brian Pinkney	The Faithful Friend	Honor
1997	Author	Walter Dean Myers	Slam	Winner
1997	Author	Patricia C. and Fredrick L. McKissack	Rebels Against Slavery: American Slave Revolts	Honor
1997	Illustrator	Jerry Pinkney	Minty: A Story of Young Harriet Tubman	Winner
1997	Illustrator	R. Gregory Christie	The Palm of My Heart: Poetry by African American Children	Honor
1997	Illustrator	Reynold Ruffins	Running the Road to ABC	Honor
1997	Illustrator	Synthia Saint James	Neeny Coming, Neeny Going	Honor
1997	Steptoe author	Martha Southgate	Another Way to Dance	Winner
1998	Author	Sharon Draper	Forged By Fire	Winner
1998	Author	James Haskins	Bayard Rustin: Behind the Scenes of the Civil Rights Movement	Honor
1998	Author	Joyce Hansen	I Thought My Soul Would Rise and Fly: The Diary of Patsy, a Freed Girl	Honor
1998	Illustrator	Javaka Steptoe	In Daddy's Arms I am Tall: African Americans Celebrating Fathers	Winner
1998	Illustrator	Ashley Bryan	Ashley Bryan's ABC of African American Poetry	Honor
1998	Illustrator	Christopher Myers	Harlem	Honor
1998	Illustrator	Baba Wagué Diakité	The Hunterman and the Crocodile	Honor
1999	Author	Angela Johnson	Heaven	Winner
1999	Author	Nikki Grimes	Jazmin's Notebook	Honor
1999	Author	Joyce Hansen and Gary McGowan	Breaking Ground, Breaking Silence: The Story of New York's African Burial Ground	Honor
1999	Author	Angela Johnson	The Other Side: Shorter Poems	Honor
1999	Illustrator	Michele Wood	I See the Rhythm	Winner
1999	Illustrator	Floyd Cooper	I Have Heard of a Land	Honor
1999	Illustrator	E. B. Lewis	The Bat Boy and His Violin	Honor
1999	Illustrator	Brian Pinkney	Duke Ellington: The Piano Prince and His Orchestra	Honor
1999	Steptoe author	Sharon Flake	The Skin I'm In	Winner
1999	Steptoe illustrator	Eric Velasquez	The Piano Man	Winner
2000	Author	Christopher Paul Curtis	Bud, Not Buddy	Winner
2000	Author	Karen English	Francie	Honor
2000	Author	Patricia C. and Fredrick L. McKissack	Black Hands, White Sails: The Story of African-American Whalers	Honor
2000	Author	Walter Dean Myers	Monster	Honor
2000	Illustrator	Brian Pinkney	In the Time of the Drums	Winner
2000	Illustrator	E. B. Lewis	My Rows and Piles of Coins	Honor
2000	Illustrator	Christopher Myers	Black Cat	Honor
2001	Author	Jacqueline Woodson	Miracle's Boys	Winner
2001	Author	Andrea Davis Pinkney	Let It Shine! Stories of Black Women Freedom Fighters	Honor
2001	Illustrator	Bryan Collier	Uptown	Winner
2001	Illustrator	Bryan Collier	Freedom River	Honor
2001	Illustrator	R. Gregory Christie	Only Passing Through: The Story of Sojourner Truth	Honor
2001	Illustrator	E. B. Lewis	Virgie Goes to School with Us Boys	Honor
2002	Author	Mildred Taylor	The Land	Winner
2002	Author	Sharon G. Flake	Money-Hungry	Honor
2002	Author	Marilyn Nelson	Carver: A Life in Poems	Honor
2002	Illustrator	Jerry Pinkney	Goin' Someplace Special	Winner
2002	Illustrator	Bryan Collier	Martin's Big Words	Honor
2002	Steptoe illustrator	Jerome Lagarrigue	Freedom Summer	Winner
2003	Author	Nikki Grimes	Bronx Masquerade	Winner
2003	Author	Brenda Woods	The Red Rose Box	Honor
2003	Author	Nikki Grimes	Talkin' About Bessie: The Story of Aviator Elizabeth Coleman	Honor
2003	Illustrator	E. B. Lewis	Talkin' About Bessie: The Story of Aviator Elizabeth Coleman	Winner
2003	Illustrator	Bryan Collier	Visiting Langston	Honor
2003	Steptoe author	Janet McDonald	Chill Wind	Winner
2003	Steptoe author / illustrator	Randy DuBurke	The Moon Ring	Winner
2004	Author	Angela Johnson	The First Part Last	Winner
2004	Author	Patricia C. and Fredrick L. McKissack	Days Of Jubilee: The End of Slavery in the United States	Honor
2004	Author	Sharon Draper	The Battle of Jericho	Honor
2004	Illustrator	Ashley Bryan	Beautiful Blackbird	Winner
2004	Illustrator	Colin Bootman	Almost to Freedom	Honor
2004	Illustrator	Kadir Nelson	Thunder Rose	Honor
2004	Illustrator	Leo and Diane Dillon	Rap a Tap Tap: Here's Bojangles	Honor
2004	Steptoe author	Hope Anita Smith	The Way a Door Closes	Winner
2004	Steptoe illustrator	Elbrite Brown	My Family Plays Music	Winner
2005	Author	Toni Morrison	Remember: The Journey to School Integration	Winner
2005	Author	Shelia P. Moses	The Legend of Buddy Bush	Honor
2005	Author	Sharon G. Flake	Who Am I without Him?: Short Stories about Girls and the Boys in Their Lives	Honor
2005	Author	Marilyn Nelson	Fortune's Bones: The Manumission Requiem	Honor
2005	Illustrator	Kadir Nelson	Ellington Was Not a Street	Winner
2005	Illustrator	Jerry Pinkney	God Bless the Child	Honor
2005	Illustrator	Leo and Diane Dillon	The People Could Fly: The Picture Book	Honor
2005	Steptoe author	Barbara Hathaway	Missy Violet and Me	Winner
2005	Steptoe illustrator	Frank Morrison	Jazzy Miz Mozetta	Winner
2006	Author	Julius Lester	Day of Tears: A Novel in Dialogue	Winner
2006	Author	Tonya Bolden	Maritcha: A Nineteenth-Century American Girl	Honor
2006	Author	Nikki Grimes	Dark Sons	Honor
2006	Author	Marilyn Nelson	A Wreath for Emmett Till	Honor
2006	Illustrator	Bryan Collier	Rosa	Winner
2006	Illustrator	R. Gregory Christie	Brothers in Hope: The Story of the Lost Boys of Sudan	Honor
2006	Steptoe author	Jaime Adoff	Jimi & Me	Winner
2007	Author	Sharon Draper	Copper Sun	Winner
2007	Author	Nikki Grimes	The Road to Paris	Honor
2007	Illustrator	Kadir Nelson	Moses: When Harriet Tubman Led Her People to Freedom	Winner
2007	Illustrator	Christopher Myers	Jazz	Honor
2007	Illustrator	Benny Andrews	Poetry for Young People: Langston Hughes	Honor
2007	Steptoe author	Traci L. Jones	Standing Against the Wind	Winner
2008	Author	Christopher Paul Curtis	Elijah of Buxton	Winner
2008	Author	Sharon Draper	November Blues	Honor
2008	Author	Charles R. Smith Jr.	Twelve Rounds to Glory: The Story of Muhammad Ali	Honor
2008	Illustrator	Ashley Bryan	Let it Shine: Three Favorite Spirituals	Winner
2008	Illustrator	Nancy Devard	The Secret Olivia Told Me	Honor
2008	Illustrator	Leo and Diane Dillon	Jazz on a Saturday Night	Honor
2008	Steptoe author	Sundee T. Frazier	Brendan Buckley's Universe and Everything In It	Winner
2009	Author	Kadir Nelson	We Are the Ship: The Story of Negro League Baseball	Winner
2009	Author	Hope Anita Smith	Keeping the Night Watch	Honor
2009	Author	Joyce Carol Thomas	The Blacker the Berry	Honor
2009	Author	Carole Boston Weatherford	Becoming Billie Holiday	Honor
2009	Illustrator	Floyd Cooper	The Blacker the Berry	Winner
2009	Illustrator	Kadir Nelson	We Are the Ship: The Story of Negro League Baseball	Honor
2009	Illustrator	Jerry Pinkney	The Moon Over Star	Honor
2009	Illustrator	Sean Qualls	Before John Was a Jazz Giant	Honor
2009	Steptoe illustrator	Shadra Strickland	Bird	Winner
2010	Author	Vaunda Micheaux Nelson	Bad News for Outlaws: The Remarkable Life of Bass Reeves, Deputy U.S. Marshal	Winner
2010	Author	Tanita S. Davis	Mare's War	Honor
2010	Illustrator	Charles R. Smith Jr.	My People	Winner
2010	Illustrator	E. B. Lewis	The Negro Speaks of Rivers	Honor
2010	Steptoe author	Kekla Magoon	The Rock and the River	Winner
2011	Author	Rita Williams-Garcia	One Crazy Summer	Winner
2011	Author	Walter Dean Myers	Lockdown	Honor
2011	Author	Jewell Parker Rhodes	Ninth Ward	Honor
2011	Author	G. Neri	Yummy: The Last Days of a Southside Shorty	Honor
2011	Illustrator	Bryan Collier	Dave the Potter: Artist, Poet, Slave	Winner
2011	Illustrator	Javaka Steptoe	Jimi Sounds Like a Rainbow: A Story of the Young Jimi Hendrix	Honor
2011	Steptoe author	Victoria Bond and T. R. Simon	Zora and Me	Winner
2011	Steptoe illustrator	Sonia Lynn Sadler	Seeds of Change	Winner
2012	Author	Kadir Nelson	Heart and Soul: The Story of America and African Americans	Winner
2012	Author	Eloise Greenfield	The Great Migration: Journey to the North	Honor
2012	Author	Patricia C. McKissack	Never Forgotten	Honor
2012	Illustrator	Shane W. Evans	Underground: Finding the Light to Freedom	Winner
2012	Illustrator	Kadir Nelson	Heart and Soul: The Story of America and African Americans	Honor
2013	Author	Andrea Davis Pinkney	Hand in Hand: Ten Black Men Who Changed America	Winner
2013	Author	Jacqueline Woodson	Each Kindness	Honor
2013	Author	Vaunda Micheaux Nelson	No Crystal Stair: A Documentary Novel of the Life and Work of Lewis Micheaux, Harlem Bookseller	Honor
2013	Illustrator	Bryan Collier	I, Too, Am America	Winner
2013	Illustrator	Daniel Minter	Ellen's Broom	Honor
2013	Illustrator	Christopher Myers	H.O.R.S.E.	Honor
2013	Illustrator	Kadir Nelson	I Have a Dream: Martin Luther King Jr.	Honor
2014	Author	Rita Williams-Garcia	P.S. Be Eleven	Winner
2014	Author	John Lewis and Andrew Aydin	March: Book One	Honor
2014	Author	Walter Dean Myers	Darius & Twig	Honor
2014	Author	Nikki Grimes	Words with Wings	Honor
2014	Illustrator	Bryan Collier	Knock Knock: My Dad's Dream for Me	Winner
2014	Illustrator	Kadir Nelson	Nelson Mandela	Honor
2014	Steptoe illustrator	Theodore Taylor III	When the Beat Was Born: DJ Kool Herc and the Creation of Hip Hop	Winner
2015	Author	Jacqueline Woodson	Brown Girl Dreaming	Winner
2015	Author	Kwame Alexander	The Crossover	Honor
2015	Author	Marilyn Nelson	How I Discovered Poetry	Honor
2015	Author	Kekla Magoon	How It Went Down	Honor
2015	Illustrator	Christopher Myers	Firebird	Winner
2015	Illustrator	Christian Robinson	Josephine: The Dazzling Life of Josephine Baker	Honor
2015	Illustrator	Frank Morrison	Little Melba and Her Big Trombone	Honor
2015	Steptoe author	Jason Reynolds	When I Was the Greatest	Winner
2016	Author	Rita Williams-Garcia	Gone Crazy in Alabama	Winner
2016	Author	Jason Reynolds and Brendan Kiely	All American Boys	Honor
2016	Author	Jason Reynolds	The Boy in the Black Suit	Honor
2016	Author	Ilyasah Shabazz and Kekla Magoon	X: A Novel	Honor
2016	Illustrator	Bryan Collier	Trombone Shorty	Winner
2016	Illustrator	R. Gregory Christie	The Book Itch: Freedom, Truth & Harlem's Greatest Bookstore	Honor
2016	Illustrator	Christian Robinson	Last Stop on Market Street	Honor
2016	Steptoe author	Ronald L. Smith	Hoodoo	Winner
2016	Steptoe illustrator	Ekua Holmes	Voice of Freedom: Fannie Lou Hamer, Spirit of the Civil Rights Movement	Winner
2017	Author	John Lewis and Andrew Aydin	March: Book Three	Winner
2017	Author	Jason Reynolds	As Brave as You	Honor
2017	Author	Ashley Bryan	Freedom Over Me: Eleven Slaves, Their Lives and Dreams Brought to Life by Ashley Bryan	Honor
2017	Illustrator	Javaka Steptoe	Radiant Child: The Story of Young Artist Jean-Michel Basquiat	Winner
2017	Illustrator	R. Gregory Christie	Freedom in Congo Square	Honor
2017	Illustrator	Ashley Bryan	Freedom Over Me: Eleven Slaves, Their Lives and Dreams Brought to Life by Ashley Bryan	Honor
2017	Illustrator	Jerry Pinkney	In Plain Sight	Honor
2017	Steptoe author	Nicola Yoon	The Sun Is Also a Star	Winner
2018	Author	Renée Watson	Piecing Me Together	Winner
2018	Author	Derrick Barnes	Crown: An Ode to the Fresh Cut	Honor
2018	Author	Jason Reynolds	Long Way Down	Honor
2018	Author	Angie Thomas	The Hate U Give	Honor
2018	Illustrator	Ekua Holmes	Out of Wonder: Celebrating Poets and Poetry	Winner
2018	Illustrator	Gordon C. James	Crown: An Ode to the Fresh Cut	Honor
2018	Illustrator	James Ransome	Before She Was Harriet: The Story of Harriet Tubman	Honor
2018	Steptoe author	David Barclay Moore	The Stars Beneath Our Feet	Winner
2018	Steptoe illustrator	Charly Palmer	Mama Africa! How Miriam Makeba Spread Hope with Her Song	Winner
2019	Author	Claire Hartfield	A Few Red Drops: The Chicago Race Riot of 1919	Winner
2019	Author	Lesa Cline-Ransome	Finding Langston	Honor
2019	Author	Varian Johnson	The Parker Inheritance	Honor
2019	Author	Kekla Magoon	The Season of Styx Malone	Honor
2019	Illustrator	Ekua Holmes	The Stuff of Stars	Winner
2019	Illustrator	Laura Freeman	Hidden Figures: The True Story of Four Black Women and the Space Race	Honor
2019	Illustrator	Frank Morrison	Let the Children March	Honor
2019	Illustrator	R. Gregory Christie	Memphis, Martin, and the Mountaintop	Honor
2019	Steptoe author	Tiffany D. Jackson	Monday's Not Coming	Winner
2019	Steptoe illustrator	Oge Mora	Thank You, Omu!	Winner
2020	Author	Jerry Craft	New Kid	Winner
2020	Author	Junauda Petrus	The Stars and the Blackness Between Them	Honor
2020	Author	Kwame Mbalia	Tristan Strong Punches a Hole in the Sky	Honor
2020	Author	Jason Reynolds	Look Both Ways: A Tale Told in Ten Blocks	Honor
2020	Illustrator	Kadir Nelson	The Undefeated	Winner
2020	Illustrator	James Ransome	The Bell Rang	Honor
2020	Illustrator	Ashley Bryan	Infinite Hope: A Black Artist's Journey from World War II to Peace	Honor
2020	Illustrator	Vashti Harrison	Sulwe	Honor
2020	Steptoe author	Alicia D. Williams	Genesis Begins Again	Winner
2020	Steptoe illustrator	April Harrison	What is Given from the Heart	Winner
2021	Author	Jacqueline Woodson	Before the Ever After	Winner
2021	Author	Mildred Taylor	All the Days Past, All the Days to Come	Honor
2021	Author	Kacen Callender	King and the Dragonflies	Honor
2021	Author	Evette Dionne	Lifting as We Climb: Black Women's Battle for the Ballot Box	Honor
2021	Illustrator	Frank Morrison	R-E-S-P-E-C-T: Aretha Franklin, the Queen of Soul	Winner
2021	Illustrator	Kaylani Juanita	Magnificent Homespun Brown: A Celebration	Honor
2021	Illustrator	Cozbi A. Cabrera	Exquisite: The Poetry and Life of Gwendolyn Brooks	Honor
2021	Illustrator	Cozbi A. Cabrera	Me & Mama	Honor
2021	Steptoe author	Tracy Deonn	Legendborn	Winner
2022	Author	Carole Boston Weatherford	Unspeakable: The Tulsa Race Massacre	Winner
2022	Author	Safia Elhillo	Home Is Not a Country	Honor
2022	Author	Kekla Magoon	Revolution in Our Time	Honor
2022	Author	Ibi Zoboi	The People Remember	Honor
2022	Illustrator	Floyd Cooper	Unspeakable: The Tulsa Race Massacre	Winner
2022	Illustrator	Christian Robinson	Nina: A Story of Nina Simone	Honor
2022	Illustrator	Raissa Figueroa	We Wait for the Sun	Honor
2022	Illustrator	C.G. Esperanza	Soul Food Sunday	Honor
2022	Steptoe author	Amber McBride	Me (Moth)	Winner
2023	Author	Amina Luqman-Dawson	Freewater	Winner
2023	Author	Ibi Zoboi	Star Child: A Biographical Constellation of Octavia Estelle Butler	Honor
2023	Author	Alicia D. Williams	The Talk	Honor
2023	Author	Tommie Smith and Derrick Barnes	Victory. Stand!: Raising My Fist for Justice	Honor
2023	Illustrator	Frank Morrison	Standing in the Need of Prayer: A Modern Retelling of the Classic Spiritual	Winner
2023	Illustrator	April Harrison	Me and the Boss: A Story of Mending and Love	Honor
2023	Illustrator	Johnnie Christmas	Swim Team	Honor
2023	Illustrator	Dawud Anyabwile	Victory. Stand!: Raising My Fist for Justice	Honor
2023	Steptoe author	Jas Hammonds	We Deserve Monuments	Winner
2023	Steptoe illustrator	Janelle Washington	Choosing Brave: How Mamie Till-Mobley and Emmett Till Sparked the Civil Rights Movement	Winner
2024	Author	Ibi Zoboi	Nigeria Jones	Winner
2024	Author	Vashti Harrison	Big	Honor
2024	Author	Carole Boston Weatherford	How Do You Spell Unfair?: MacNolia Cox and the National Spelling Bee	Honor
2024	Author	Carole Boston Weatherford	Kin: Rooted in Hope	Honor
2024	Illustrator	Dare Coulter	An American Story	Winner
2024	Illustrator	Vashti Harrison	Big	Honor
2024	Illustrator	Shannon Wright	Holding Her Own: The Exceptional Life of Jackie Ormes	Honor
2024	Illustrator	Jerome Pumphrey and Jarrett Pumphrey	There Was a Party for Langston	Honor
2024	Steptoe author	Jade Adia	There Goes the Neighborhood	Winner
2024	Steptoe illustrator	Briana Mukodiri Uchendu	We Could Fly	Winner
2025	Author	Jason Reynolds	Twenty-four Seconds from Now...	Winner
2025	Author	Renée Watson	Black Girl You Are Atlas	Honor
2025	Author	Kwame Alexander	Black Star	Honor
2025	Author	Lesa Cline-Ransome	One Big Open Sky	Honor
2025	Illustrator	C. G. Esperanza	My Daddy Is a Cowboy	Winner
2025	Illustrator	Ekua Holmes	Coretta: The Autobiography of Mrs. Coretta Scott King	Honor
2025	Illustrator	E. B. Lewis	Everywhere Beauty Is Harlem: The Vision of Photographer Roy DeCarava	Honor
2025	Illustrator	April Harrison	Go Forth and Tell: The Life of Augusta Baker, Librarian and Master Storyteller	Honor
2025	Steptoe author	Craig Kofi Farmer	Kwame Crashes the Underworld	Winner
2025	Steptoe illustrator	Jamiel Law	Jimmy's Rhythm & Blues	Winner
2026	Author	Jewell Parker Rhoades	Will's Race for Home	Winner
2026	Author	Derrick Barnes	The Incredibly Human Henson Blayze	Honor
2026	Author	Calvin Alexander Ramsey	The Library in the Woods	Honor
2026	Author	Marie Arnold	Split the Sky	Honor
2026	Illustrator	R. Gregory Christie	The Library in the Woods	Winner
2026	Illustrator	Lamont O’Neal	André: André Leon Talley–A Fabulously Fashionable Fairy Tale	Honor
2026	Illustrator	Alexis Franklin	City Summer, Country Summer	Honor
2026	Steptoe author	Arriel Vinson	Under the Neon Lights	Winner

== Hamilton Award for Lifetime Achievement ==
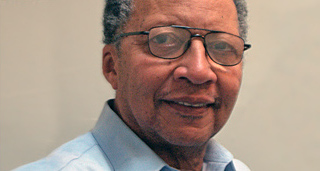
Walter Dean Myers has the most Coretta Scott King Awards wins as an author with five, and was the inaugural recipient of the Hamilton Award for Lifetime achievement

From 2010 the Coretta Scott King Awards include the Coretta Scott King–Virginia Hamilton Award for Lifetime Achievement, or Virginia Hamilton Award. It is presented to creators and practitioners alternately: in even years, to an African American writer or illustrator of books for children or young adults; in odd years, to a practitioner for "active engagement with youth using award-winning African American literature for children and/or young adults, via implementation of reading and reading related activities/programs."

- 2010: Walter Dean Myers, author
- 2011: Dr. Henrietta Mays Smith, professor emerita, University of South Florida, School of Information.
- 2012: Ashley Bryan, storyteller, artist, author, poet, and musician
- 2013: Demetria Tucker, family and youth services librarian for the Pearl Bailey Library, a branch of the Newport News (Va.) Public Library System
- 2014: Patricia and Fredrick McKissack, children's authors
- 2015: Deborah D. Taylor, young adult librarian
- 2016: Jerry Pinkney, illustrator
- 2017: Dr. Rudine Sims Bishop, professor emerita of education at Ohio State University
- 2018: Eloise Greenfield, author
- 2019: Dr. Pauletta Brown Bracy, professor of library science and director of the Office of University Accreditation at North Carolina Central University
- 2020: Mildred Taylor, author
- 2021: Dorothy L. Guthrie, retired librarian, district administrator, author and school board member
- 2022: Nikki Grimes, author
- 2023: Dr. Claudette McLinn, retired librarian and bookseller
- 2024: Christopher Paul Curtis, author
- 2025: Carolyn L. Garnes, public library director and founder of Aunt Lil's Reading Room
- 2026: Kadir Nelson, author and illustrator

== See also ==
- Timeline of African-American children's literature
