= Pat Cummings (illustrator) =

American writer and illustrator (born 1950)

- Born: November 9, 1950 (age 74); Chicago, Illinois, United States
- Education: Pratt Institute
- Known for: Children's books illustrator
- Awards: NAACP Image Award for Outstanding Literary Work; Coretta Scott King Award (1984); Horn Book-Boston Globe Award

Patricia Marie Cummings (born November 9, 1950) is an American writer and illustrator of children's books.

== Early life ==
Cummings' father was in the Army, and her family lived in different locations from Europe to Asia when she was growing up. She remembered "My brother and sisters and I were always the 'new kids', but I found that art helped me to get to know my classmates." Growing up, her parents would read them stories about fairytales, which fueled her imagination as she explored castles on the Rhine River and villages in Okinawa.

She attended Pratt Institute in New York City. After graduation, Cummings initially freelanced for editorial and advertising clients before focusing exclusively on children's books.

== Career ==
Cummings is the creator of over 30 books for children, including titles that have won the Horn Book-Boston Globe Award and the Orbis Pictus Award for nonfiction. She won the Coretta Scott King Award in 1984 for the illustrations in My Mama Needs Me (written by Mildred Pitts Walter), and was a finalist for Just Us Women (written by Jeannette Caines) and C.L.O.U.D.S., which she wrote and illustrated. As one of the illustrators for Our Children Can Soar (Bloomsbury, 2009) she received the NAACP Image Award for Outstanding Literary Work: Children.

She worked as a producer and writer for Gullah Gullah Island, a Nickelodeon children's show and cohosted Cover to Cover, a cable TV talk show about children's books and the people who create them.

Pat serves as National Secretary of The Authors Guild and sits on the Boards of The Authors Guild Foundation, The Authors League Fund, The Society of Children's Book Writers and Illustrators (SCBWI) and The Eric Carle Museum of Picture Book Art. She is also a member of The Writer's Guild and teaches children's book illustration at Pratt and Parsons, the New School for Design. Pat's goal is to prepare students for a career in children's books. Her well-published former students include Julian Hector, Hiroe Nakata, and David Ezra Stein, recipient of the 2011 Caldecott Honor Award. She lives in Brooklyn, New York with her husband.

== Works ==
Written "Trace' [HarperCollins] [New York City|New York] 2019.

=== Written and illustrated ===
- Jimmy Lee Did It, Lothrop (New York, NY), 1985.
- C.L.O.U.D.S., Lothrop (New York, NY), 1986. (Coretta Scott King Award Illustrator Honor 1987)
- Clean Your Room, Harvey Moon, Bradbury (New York, NY), 1991.
- Petey Moroni's Camp Runamok Diary, Bradbury (New York, NY), 1992.
- Purr, HarperFestival (New York, NY), 1999.
- Angel Baby, Harper (New York, NY), 2000.
- Ananse and the Lizard, Henry Holt (New York, NY), 2002.
- Harvey Moon, Museum Boy, HarperCollins (New York, NY), 2008.

=== Illustrated ===
- Eloise Greenfield, Good News, Coward-McCann (New York, NY), 1977.
- Jeanette Caines, Just Us Women, Harper (New York, NY), 1982. (Coretta Scott King Award Illustrator Honor 1983)
- Mildred Pitts Walter, My Mama Needs Me, Lothrop, Lee and Shepard Books, 1984. (Coretta Scott King Award Illustrator Winner 1984)
- Jeanette Caines, Chilly Stomach, Harper (New York, NY), 1986.
- Jeanette Caines, I Need a Lunch Box, Harper (New York, NY), 1988.
- Mary Stolz, Storm in the Night, Harper (New York, NY), 1988.
- Mildred Pitts Walter, Mariah Loves Rock, Bradbury (New York, NY), 1988.
- Joyce Durham Barrett, Willie's Not the Hugging Kind, Harper (New York, NY), 1989.
- Mildred Pitts Walter, Two and Too Much, Bradbury (New York, NY), 1990.
- Mary Stolz, Go Fish, Harper (New York, NY), 1991.
- Margaret Read MacDonald, Pickin' Peas, HarperCollins (New York, NY), 1998.
- Elizabeth Fitzgerald Howard, Lulu's Birthday, Greenwillow (New York, NY), 2001.
- Elizabeth Winthrop, Squashed in the Middle, Henry Holt (New York, NY), 2005.
- Michelle Cook, Our Children Can Soar, Bloomsbury (New York, NY), 2012.
