= Kadir Nelson =

American painter, illustrator, and author (born 1974)

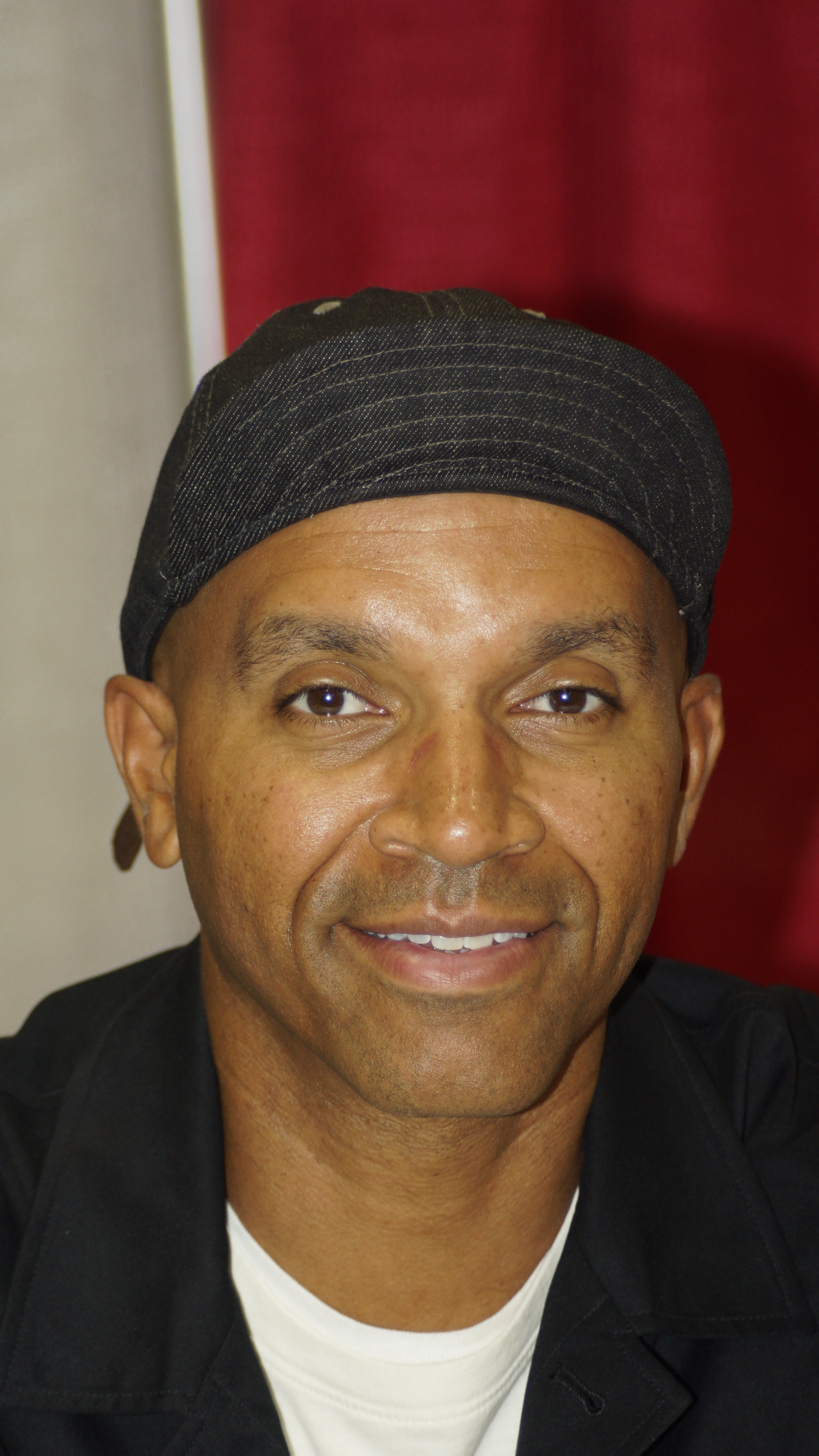
- Nelson in 2026
- Born: May 15, 1974 (age 52); Washington, DC
- Education: Pratt Institute
- Known for: Magazine cover illustrations
- Style: Conceptual artist
- Parents: Lenwood Nelson (educator) (father); Emily Gunther (author) (mother)

Kadir Nelson (May 15, 1974) is a Los Angeles-based painter, illustrator, and author who is best known for his paintings often featured on the covers of The New Yorker magazine, and album covers for Michael Jackson and Drake. His work is focused on African-American culture and history. The New York Times described his work as "sumptuous, deeply affecting work. Nelson’s paintings are drenched in ambience, and often overt symbolism. He has twice been a Caldecott honor recipient and won the 2020 Caldecott Medal for his illustrations in The Undefeated.

== Career ==
In 1996, Nelson began his career as a conceptual artist for Steven Spielberg's feature film Amistad, and the animated feature film Spirit: Stallion of the Cimarron. Nelson has since designed several commemorative postage stamps for the United States Postal Service including stamps featuring Wilt Chamberlain, Joe Dimaggio, and Richard Wright. He has also authored and/or illustrated over 30 picture books including, Brothers of the Knight by actress Debbie Allen, WE ARE THE SHIP: The Story of Negro League Baseball, which was featured on the cover of Sports Illustrated magazine, and Heart and Soul: The Story of America and African Americans. In 2013, Nelson was commissioned to paint his first cover for The New Yorker magazine, a portrait of Nelson Mandela. Nelson has since created several memorable covers for the magazine including, Eustace Negro, Schomburg Center, Harlem, New York, and A Day at the Beach.

== Early life and education ==
Nelson was born in Washington D.C., and grew up in Atlantic City, New Jersey and San Diego, California, the son of author Emily Gunter and educator Lenwood Nelson. He received his early training in art from his uncle, Michael Morris, who is an artist and art instructor. Both his uncle and his high school art teacher taught him important artistic principles and techniques, including how to paint with oils. After developing an impressive portfolio during high school, Crawford High in San Diego, Kadir Nelson earned a partial scholarship to the prestigious Pratt Institute in Brooklyn, New York. Nelson earned his BFA from Pratt Institute in Brooklyn, New York in 1996.

== Works ==
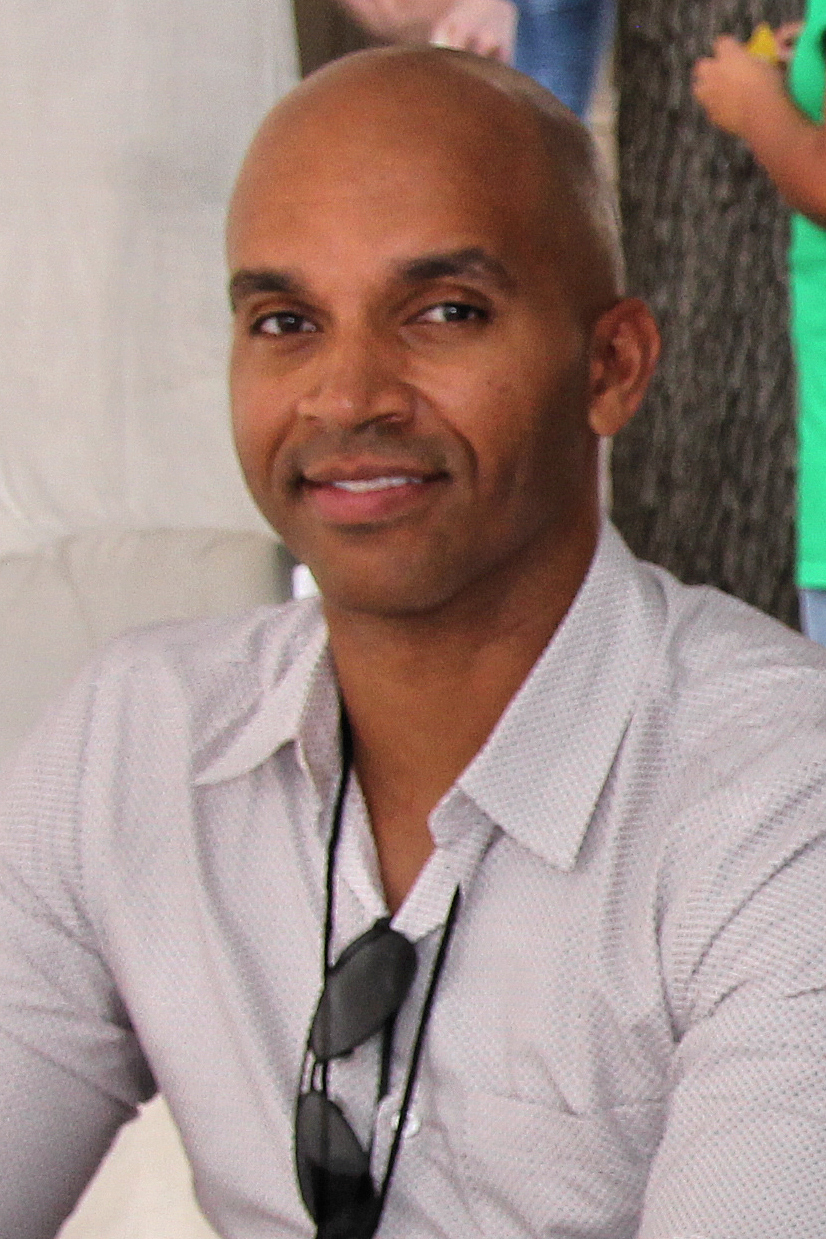
Nelson at the 2017 Texas Book Festival

In August 1999, Nelson’s paintings depicting Negro league baseball scenes were featured in Sports Illustrated magazine on its opening Leading Off pages. They were some of the first paintings in a series of works that led to Nelson writing and illustrating a book commemorating the history of the Negro Baseball Leagues entitled, We Are the Ship: The Story of Negro Leagues Baseball, published by Jump at the Sun in 2008. Nelson’s critically acclaimed authorial debut was created over the span of seven years and earned Nelson the Sibert Medal, a Coretta Scott King Author Award and Illustrator Honor. We Are the Ship was released by Brilliance Audio as an audiobook in 2009, narrated by voice actor Dion Graham.

In 2008, Nelson was commissioned by the US House of Representatives to paint the official portrait of Representative Shirley Anita Chisholm. The original painting hangs in the US Capitol Building in Washington DC.

In 2017, Nelson was commissioned to paint a portrait of Henrietta Lacks to promote HBO’s upcoming film, The Immortal Life of Henrietta Lacks, based on the book by Rebecca Skloot. The painting was exhibited at the Reginald F. Lewis Museum in Baltimore, Maryland and other venues. The painting was later co-acquired by the Smithsonian museums National Portrait Gallery and the National Museum of African American History and Culture.

=== Album cover art ===
Nelson created the mural used as cover art for Swizz Beatz's 2002 album Swizz Beatz Presents G.H.E.T.T.O. Stories.

In 2005, Nelson was contacted by Michael Jackson to create a commissioned painting of the King of Pop’s life story. The commission was delayed and shelved for several years until the untimely death of the singer in 2009. Upon which Nelson was tapped to resume the portrait to be used later for the posthumously released album titled Michael. On Friday, December 10, 2010, a 29,070-square-foot (2,701 m^{2}) poster depicting the Michael album artwork was erected at the Rectory Farm in Middlesex, England, which broke a Guinness World Record for the largest poster in the world.

In 2013, Nelson was contacted by recording artist Drake to create two covers for his album Nothing Was the Same. The album artwork became a signature work for the recording artist, and the subject of multiple internet memes. The album remained on the Billboard 200 sales chart for more than 400 weeks after its release in 2013.

== Recognition and honors ==
Nelson has received multiple Gold and Silver Medals from the New York Society of Illustrators. In February 2014, Nelson was awarded the Hamilton King Award for best illustration of the year. Nelson is also the recipient of three NAACP Image Awards for his illustrated picture books, and the New York Times Best Illustrated Book for We Are The Ship: The Story of Negro League Baseball.

Nelson won the Coretta Scott King Illustrator Award three times, in 2005, 2007, and 2020. He also won the Caldecott Honor twice, in 2007 and 2008. For his book We Are the Ship: The Story of Negro League Baseball he received the 2008 CASEY Award for best baseball book, the 2009 Coretta Scott King Author Award, and the 2009 Robert F. Sibert Informational Book Award. He won the Coretta Scott King Author Award again in 2012 for Heart and Soul: The Story of America and African Americans. In 2020, Nelson won the Caldecott Medal and Coretta Scott King Award for his illustrations in The Undefeated.

In January 2026, the American Library Association honoured Nelson with the Coretta Scott King – Virginia Hamilton Award for Lifetime Achievement for his extensive body of work in children's literature.

== Exhibitions ==
Nelson has had exhibitions in galleries and museums throughout the United States and the world, including the Muskegon Museum of Art, Chicago Art Institute, and The Studio Museum in Harlem.

Kadir Nelson's portrait of Henrietta Lacks was jointly acquired by The Smithsonian's National Portrait Gallery and the National Museum of African American History and Culture. Lacks' portrait was commissioned by HBO. His portrait of José Andrés is in the collection of the Smithsonian National Portrait Gallery.

== Bibliography ==
Illustrations only unless otherwise indicated.

- Brothers of the Knight by Debbie Allen. Dial, 1999.
- Big Jabe by Jerdine Nolen. HarperCollins, 2000.
- Salt in His Shoes: Michael Jordan in Pursuit of a Dream by Deloris and Roslyn Jordan. Simon & Schuster, 2000.
- Dancing in the Wings, Debbie Allen. Dial, 2000.
- Just the Two of Us by Will Smith. Scholastic, 2001.(NAACP Image Award)
- Please, Baby, Please by Spike and Tonya Lee. Simon & Schuster, 2002.
- Under the Christmas Tree by Nikki Grimes. HarperCollins, 2002.
- The Village that Vanished by Ann Grifalconi. Dial, 2002.
- Thunder Rose by Jerdine Nolen. Harcourt, 2003.
- Ellington Was Not a Street by Ntozake Shange. Simon & Schuster, 2004
- He’s Got the Whole World in His Hands, illustrated by Kadir Nelson, based on the traditional song lyrics. Dial, 2005.
- The Real Slam Dunk by Charisse Richardson. Dial, 2005.
- Hewitt Anderson’s Great Big Life by Jerdine Nolen. Simon & Schuster, 2005.
- Please, Puppy, Please by Spike and Tonya Lee. Simon & Schuster, 2005.
- Moses: When Harriet Tubman Led Her People to Freedom, by Carole Boston Weatherford, Hyperion/Jump at the Sun, 2006 (2007 Caldecott Honor book)
- Henry's Freedom Box: A True Story from the Underground Railroad, Ellen Levine. Scholastic, 2007.(2008 Caldecott Honor book)
- Michael's Golden Rules by Deloris Jordan, introduction by Michael Jordan. Simon & Schuster, 2007.
- We Are the Ship:The Story of Negro League Baseball, written and illustrated by Kadir Nelson, foreword by Hank Aaron, Hyperion/Jump at the Sun, 2008.
- Abe's Hones Words, by Doreen Rappaport. Hyperion, 2008. ISBN 978-142310408-7
- Change Has Come: An Artist Celebrates Our American Spirit, quotations from Barack Obama, black and white line drawings by Kadir Nelson. New York: Simon & Schuster, 2009. ISBN 978-1-4169-8955-4
- Testing the Ice: A True Story About Jackie Robinson, by Sharon Robinson, Scholastic, 2009; ISBN 978-0-545-05251-1
- All God's Critters, song lyrics by Bill Staines, Simon & Schuster, 2009
- Mama Miti: Wangari Maathai and the Trees of Kenya, by Donna Jo Napoli, Simon & Schuster/Paula Wiseman Books, 2010, ISBN 978-1-4169-3505-6
- A Nation's Hope: The Story of Boxing Legend Joe Louis, by Matt de la Peña, Dial Books, 2011, ISBN 978-0-8037-3167-7
- Nelson Mandela, written and illustrated by Kadir Nelson, 2013, ISBN 0061783749
- Baby Bear, written and illustrated by Kadir Nelson, 2014, ISBN 0062241729
- If You Plant a Seed, written and illustrated by Kadir Nelson, 2015, ISBN 0062298895
- Taylor, Mildred D. (2016). Roll of thunder, hear my cry. Introduction by Jacqueline Woodson; illustration by Kadir Nelson (40th Anniversary Special ed.). New York: Dial Books for Young Readers.
- Blue Sky, White Stars, written by Sarvinder Naberhaus and illustrated by Kadir Nelson, 2017, ISBN 0803737009
- The Undefeated, written by Kwame Alexander and illustrated by Kadir Nelson, 2019, ISBN 1328780961
