= Twelve Rounds to Glory =

Book by Charles R. Smith Jr.

Twelve Rounds to Glory: The Story of Muhammad Ali
- First edition
- Author: Charles R. Smith Jr.
- Illustrator: Bryan Collier
- Language: English
- Subject: Muhammad Ali
- Genre: Children's illustrated biography
- Publisher: Candlewick Press
- Publication date: 2007
- Publication place: United States
- Pages: 80
- ISBN: 978-0-7636-1692-2

Twelve Rounds to Glory: The Story of Muhammad Ali is a 2007 illustrated biography of Muhammad Ali for children written by Charles R. Smith Jr. and illustrated by Bryan Collier. Smith won an author honor at the 2008 Coretta Scott King Book Awards for this book.
