= Stephanie Borges (poet) =

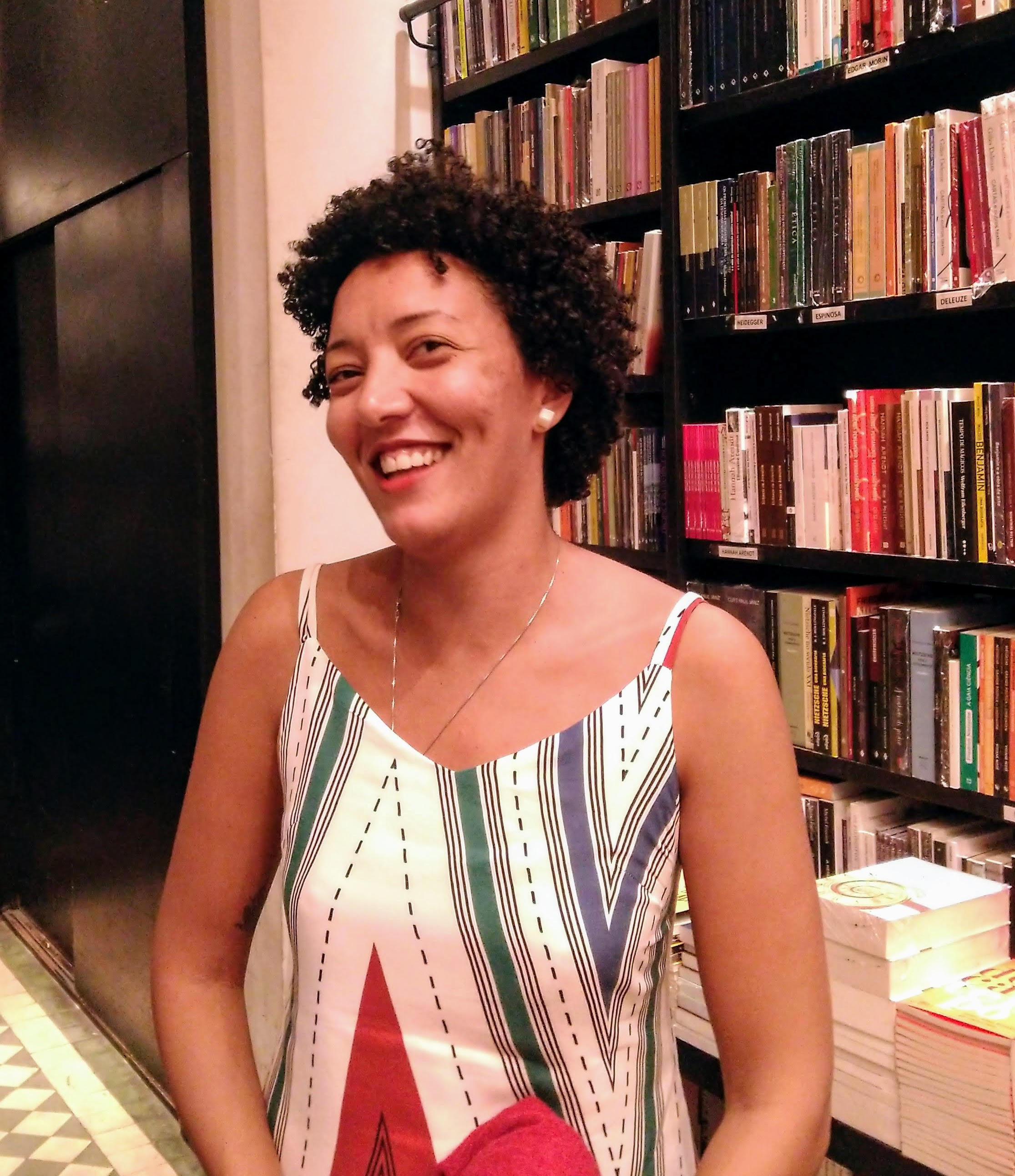
- Stephanie Borges, 2019
- Born: 29 October 1984 (age 41); Rio de Janeiro, Brazil
- Education: Fluminense Federal University
- Occupations: Poet, translator, journalist
- Writing career
- Notable awards: Prêmio Cepe Nacional de Literatura- poesia (2018)

Stephanie Borges (born 29 October 1984) is a Brazilian journalist, poet, and translator.

== Biography ==
Stephanie Borges was born in Rio de Janeiro. She graduated in Social Communication at the Fluminense Federal University. She worked for communication agencies and for the publishing houses Cosac Naify and Globo Livros. She translated into Portuguese works by bell hooks, Claudia Rankine and Audre Lorde.

She wrote poems for magazines Escamandro, Ruído Manifesto, Garupa and Pessoa. Her first book, Talvez precisemos de um nome para isto, a reflection on the subjectivity of Black women based on their relationship with their hair, won the Prêmio Cepe Nacional de Literatura in 2018 in the Poetry category.

She participated in the podcast Benzina together with the anthropologist Orlando Calheiros.

== Works ==
=== Poetry ===
- Talvez Precisemos de um Nome Para Isso. Recife: Cepe, 2019. ISBN 9788578587741

=== Translation ===
- VERKAIK, Robert. Jihadi John: Como nasce um terrorista. [Jihadi John: The Making of a Terrorist] Tradução de Stephanie Borges. São Paulo: HarperCollins Brasil, 2017. ISBN 9788595080898.
- MOORE, Darvid Barclay. As estrelas sob os nossos pés [The Stars Beneath Our Feet] Tradução de Stephanie Borges. São Paulo: Plataforma 21, 2018. ISBN 9788592783754
- CLAYTON, Dhonielle. Belles [The Belles]. Tradução de Stephanie Borges. São Paulo: Plataforma 21, 2018. ISBN 9788592783921.
- HOOKS, bell. Olhares negros: raça e representação. [Black Looks: Race and representation] Tradução de Stephanie Borges. São Paulo: Elefante, 2019. ISBN 9788593115219
- LORDE, Audre. Irmã outsider: ensaios e conferências. [Sister Outsider: Essays and Speeches] Tradução de Stephanie Borges. São Paulo: Autêntica, 2019. ISBN 9788551304341
- WOODSON, Jacqueline. Um outro Brooklyn. [Another Brooklyn] Tradução de Stephanie Borges. São Paulo: Todavia, 2020. ISBN 978-65-5114-007-5
