= Hope Anita Smith =

American poet and children's book author

- Born: Akron, Ohio, U.S.
- Education: La Sierra University
- Writing career
- Language: English
- Years active: 1999–present
- Genres: Poetry, middle grade fiction, picture books
- Notable work: Keeping the Night Watch
- Notable awards: Coretta Scott King Award (2004)

Hope Anita Smith is an American poet and author of children's books, best known for winning the Coretta Scott King Honor for her middle grade novel Keeping the Night Watch.

== Biography ==
Smith was born in Akron, Ohio. She was introduced to the children's publishing industry via fellow author and teacher Myra Cohn Livingston, whose class she attended and ultimately discovered her voice and interest in writing for children there. She attended La Sierra University from 1980 to 1983, studying English, but ultimately did not graduate.

Smith wrote her second picture book My Daddy Rules the World: Poems about Dads, with the intention of celebrating fathers all over the world because she cites to have always had a soft spot for the way fathers interact with their children, also intending to give credit to fathers.

== Selected works ==
Picture books

- Mother Poems (Henry Holt, 2009)
- My Daddy Rules the World: Poems about Dads (Henry Holt, 2017)

Middle grade

- The Way a Door Closes, illustrated by Shane W. Evans (Henry Holt, 2003)
- Keeping the Night Watch (Henry Holt, 2008)
- It Rained Warm Bread, co-authored with Gloria Moskowitz-Sweet, illustrated by Lea Lyon (Henry Holt, 2019)

== Awards and honors ==
- 2004 John Steptoe New Talent Author Award for The Way a Door Closes, illustrated by Shane W. Evans
- 2004 Judy Lopez Memorial Award for Children's Literature for The Way a Door Closes, illustrated by Shane W. Evans
- 2004 Claudia Lewis Award for The Way a Door Closes, illustrated by Shane W. Evans
- 2008 School Library Journal's Best Books of 2008 for Keeping the Night Watch
- 2009 Coretta Scott King Honor for Keeping the Night Watch
- 2009 American Library Association Notable Children's Books for Keeping the Night Watch
