= Dave the Potter: Artist, Poet, Slave =

2010 book by Laban Carrick Hill

- Author: Laban Carrick Hill
- Illustrator: Bryan Collier
- Genre: Children's picture book
- Publisher: Little, Brown and Company
- Publication date: 2010
- Publication place: United States
- Media type: Print (hardcover)
- Pages: 40
- Awards: Coretta Scott King Award Caldecott Medal Honor Book
- ISBN: 978-0-316-10731-0
- OCLC: 51699

Dave the Potter: Artist, Poet, Slave is a 2010 picture book written by Laban Carrick Hill. Illustrator Bryan Collier won the Coretta Scott King Award and Caldecott Medal in 2011 for his artwork in the book. It was originally published by Little, Brown and Company.

== Synopsis ==
This picture book tells the story of David Drake who was an enslaved potter in South Carolina in the 1800s. The book is written in simple free verse poetry. It begins with comparisons on how everyday people viewed dirt, while Dave knew it would make beautiful pots for flowers, storing food, and memories. Dave takes clay from Big Horse Creek and puts it on his potter's wheel, eventually shaping it into a jar. Details like Dave's chapped thumbs, his clay covered palms, and the warm feelings he had towards pottery are explored. After the jar's sides are smoothed with water, he starts to mix wood ash and sand to make a brown glaze. Before the jar completely dried, he inscribes a poem into the clay and signs his name and date. After the story is finished, there are pictures of Dave's work, as well as a longer biography about him. Details of his life are explored the different poems he inscribed into his pots.

== Background ==
Laban Carrick Hill conceptualized the book after stumbling upon a talk given by Vassar College art professor Lisa Gail Collins. She spoke about African influences on African American art, and mentioned one of Dave's pots and poems. This stuck with the author, finally deciding to write a book after watching an episode of Antiques Roadshow that showed one of Dave's artworks. Hill researched online and obtained a catalog from an exhibition of his work held at the McKissick Museum at the University of South Carolina. He began writing as he realized his amazement for the artistry of Dave.

To prepare for illustrating this book, Bryan Collier traveled to where Dave had lived – an area right outside Edgefield, South Carolina, called Pottersville. He met with local potter Stephen Ferrell, who showed Collier one of Dave's works and explained his lasting influence on pottery in the area. Illustrations in the book are done with watercolor and collage on 400lb Arches watercolor paper. He shows readers a step-by-step process of how Dave would create a pot. There are not any photographs of him, so Collier used a model as reference. Though the words in the book do not mention that Dave is a slave explicitly, the illustrator attempted to show viewers this reality through shackles and other slaves in the fields. Collier was moved by his story, as he felt Dave's artwork represents dignity despite unimaginable hardships.

== Reception ==
Dave the Potter: Artist, Poet, Slave was received favorably. One review from Kirkus praises the "playful" way Hill writes, as well as the visual imagery in the book. Another from Booklist mentions how Collier's illustrations are "infused with pride, and always catching his subjects in the most telling of poses." Book Links added it to their list of great books for teaching African-American history in the classroom. A starred review from School Library Journal calls it "perfect in every way." They compare Hill's short poetry to Dave's own words and comment on the "rural imagery" the author uses to show setting. The review also mentions awe at the detail Collier spent on Dave's hands and eyes.

The book won many awards. In 2011, illustrator Bryan Collier won both the Coretta Scott King Award, and was a Caldecott Medal Honor Book. In 2011, it. made the list of Orbis Pictus Award recommended books.
