= Poetry for Young People: Langston Hughes =

Children's poetry collection

Poetry for Young People: Langston Hughes is a 2006 children's poetry collection by Langston Hughes edited by David Roessel and Arnold Rampersad and illustrated by Benny Andrews, originally published by Sterling Publishing Company.

== Synopsis ==
Selected poems of African American poet Langston Hughes are compiled accompanied by illustrations representing elements of the poems.

== Background and development ==
Rampersad is the author of a two volume biography of Langston Hughes. Roessel has also shown interest in Hughes' life and co-edited other collections of Hughes poetry.

== Reception ==
The book received an honor award for the 2007 Coretta Scott King Award for illustration.
