= Deborah D. Taylor =

American librarian

Deborah D. Taylor is a librarian and coordinator of school and student services at Enoch Pratt Free Library in Baltimore, Maryland. In 2015, she received the Coretta Scott King-Virginia Hamilton Award for Lifetime Achievement.

Taylor received her Bachelor of Arts and master's degree from the University of Maryland, College Park.

Taylor has worked at the Enoch Pratt Free Library since 1974, performing different roles such as branch librarian and head of the Office of Children and Youth.

Taylor specializes in introducing young people and her professional colleagues, including university professors, to high quality works created by African Americans. She is a member of the Voice of Youth Advocates Editorial Advisory Board and the board of the Institute of Museum and Library Services, and has served as the president of the Young Adult Library Services Association, and chair of the Coretta Scot King Book Awards.

The award chair of the American Library Association, Loretta Dowell, claimed that "Deborah D. Taylor is an extraordinary youth librarian and literacy advocate."
