= Heart and Soul: The Story of America and African Americans =

2011 children's picture book by Kadir Nelson

- First edition
- Author: Kadir Nelson
- Language: English
- Genre: Picture book
- Publisher: HarperCollins
- Publication date: 2011
- Publication place: United States

Heart and Soul: The Story of America and African Americans is an American illustrated picture book for young adult readers, originally published by HarperCollins in 2011. Kadir Nelson, both the author and illustrator, writes from the perspective of an unnamed narrator and reviews significant events in African-American history. The book received a 2012 Coretta Scott King Author Award.

== Synopsis ==
Nelson begins the story with an emotional introduction that talks about the many triumphs and hardships African Americans have overcome in America. Nelson then writes individual mini chapters about significant events such as slavery, the Revolutionary War, the Civil War, Jim Crow laws, emancipation, the Civil Rights Movement, and the vote for women. Each section discusses significant members of the African American community and their contributions.

== Reception ==
The book received positive critical reviews. Common Sense Media wrote that the book's "epic narrative" was "compelling, complex, and deeply personal." The New York Times wrote that the book "cries out for a teacher or parent to expand and deepen the experience."

The book won a 2012 Coretta Scott King Author Award.
