= Jas Hammonds =

American writer

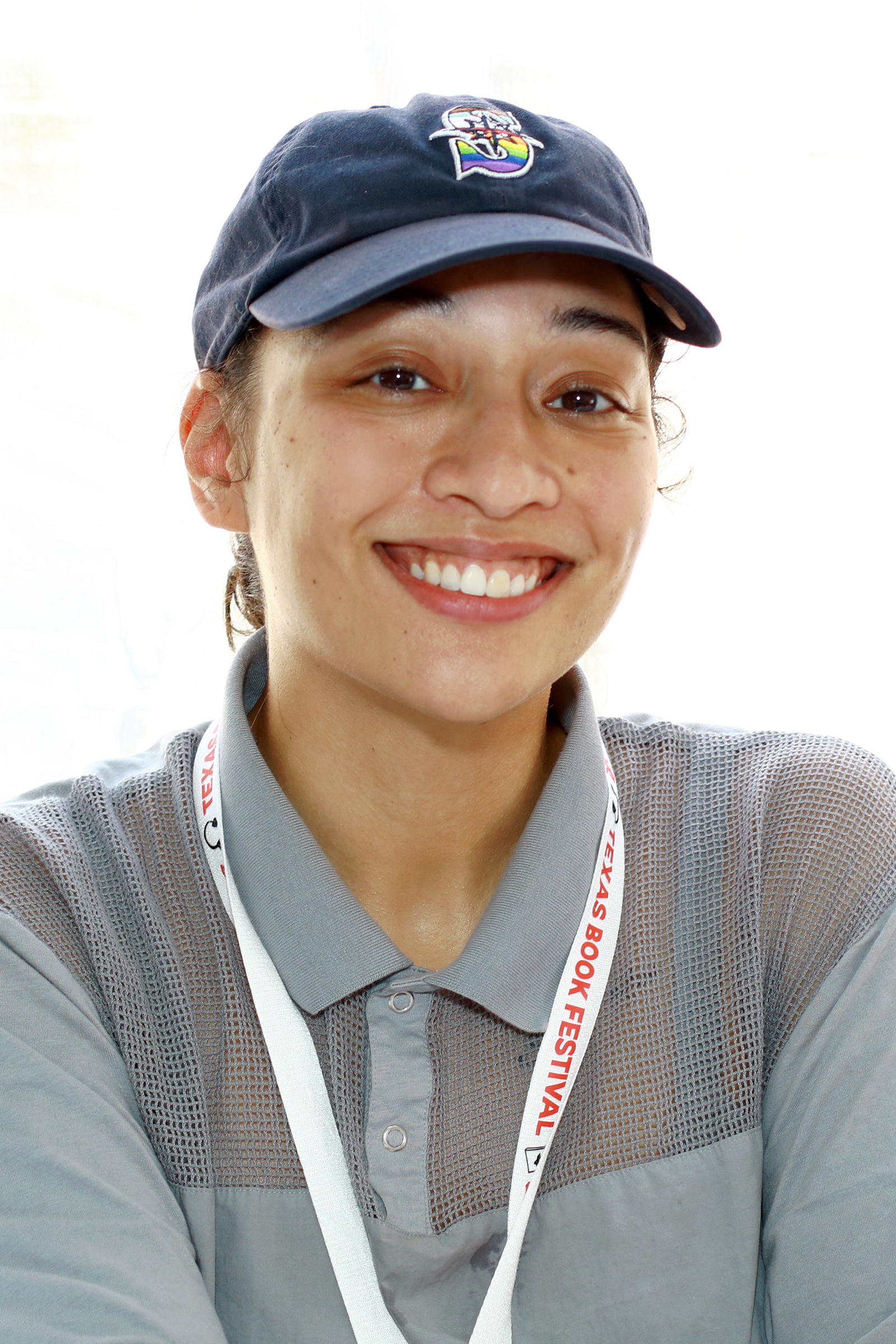
- Hammonds at the 2024 Texas Book Festival.
- Occupation: Novelist
- Writing career
- Language: English
- Years active: 2020–present
- Genre: Young adult
- Notable awards: Coretta Scott King-John Steptoe Award (2023)
- Website: www.jashammonds.com

Jas Hammonds is an American writer of young adult fiction, best known for their Coretta Scott King Award-winning debut We Deserve Monuments.

== Personal life ==
Hammonds says they enjoys writing about themes of mental health, queerness, exploration of mixed-raced identities and Blackness, complicated family and friendship dynamics, and bittersweet endings, which always an appearance in their works.

The first book they remember reading is There’s a Wocket in My Pocket by Dr. Seuss and the book that made them want to be a writer is Alice in Rapture, Sort of by Phyllis Reynolds Naylor.

Hammonds identifies as a Black, queer non-binary writer and has lived in the Pacific Northwest.

Before becoming an author, they were a flight attendant.

== Career ==
Hammonds is a recipient of the 2020 James Baldwin fellowship at MacDowell. They have also been awarded multiple fellowships by Highlights Foundation, Lambda Literary Review, and Baldwin for the Arts.

=== We Deserve Monuments ===
We Deserve Monuments is set in a fictional town in Georgia and tells the story of a Black biracial girl moving there to aid her aging, sick grandmother. The story explores the themes of love, family, generational trauma, and racism. They wrote the first draft in 2016 and originally envisioned it as a ghost story. It was published by Roaring Brook, an imprint of Macmillan, in Summer 2022.

It was critically well-received, becoming a Summer/Fall 2022 Indies Introduce YA selection, and a Best Book of 2022 as chosen by Kirkus Reviews and School Library Journal, as well as garnering starred reviews from Kirkus Reviews, Booklist, School Library Journal, BookPage, and Shelf Awareness.

We Deserve Monuments also was the 2023 Coretta Scott King-John Steptoe Award for New Talent Winner.

=== Thirsty ===
Their second novel, Thirsty, is about a mixed-race lesbian girl that joins an exclusive sorority in her first year of college that promises to help her build valuable connections to powerful women of color, and uses alcohol to cope with the financial pressure, her anxiety, and her lack of social status. It was published in May 2024. Hammonds says their aim was to explore the themes of the connection between alcohol and societal pressure in a college setting.
