= I See the Rhythm =

1998 children's book by Michele Wood

- Author: Michele Wood
- Publisher: Children's Book Press
- Publication date: 1998
- Pages: 32
- Awards: Coretta Scott King Illustrator Award
- ISBN: 0-516-21191-9
- OCLC: 37513013

I See the Rhythm, illustrated by Michele Wood with text by Toyomi Igus, was published in 1998 by Lee & Low Books. It won the Coretta Scott King Award for Illustrator in 1999.

== Synopsis ==
Michele Wood's paintings represent genres from the history of African-American music. Poems by Toyomi Igus accompany the paintings and describe the genre using varied rhythms, fonts, and font sizes. Captions provide additional information and historical context for the music genre.

== Background ==
After reviewing historical accounts and interviewing participants in African-American music, Wood created the paintings in the book. Igus used Wood's paintings as inspiration for the poems in the book. Children's Book Press, now Lee & Low Books, published the book in 1998.

== Criticism ==
Publishers Weekly wrote that the book was a "lyrically memorable tour de force" and "impeccably crafted." At Kirkus Reviews, the reviewer complimented the illustrations for "broadcast[ing] joy, innovation, and exuberance in the face of systematic oppression." Multicultural Education wrote that it was an "inspiring celebration of African American music." Booklist wrote that Wood's illustrations enliven Igus's prose poems, but that readers who understand the text might not be drawn to a picture book.

The book won the Skipping Stones 1999 award for Multicultural and International books.
