= Memphis, Martin, and the Mountaintop =

First edition

Memphis, Martin, and the Mountaintop: The Sanitation Strike of 1968 is a 2018 children's picture book told in poetry and prose by writer Alice Faye Duncan and illustrator R. Gregory Christie, published by Calkins Creek.

== Synopsis ==
In February 1968, two African American sanitation workers were killed by unsafe garbage truck equipment in Memphis, Tennessee. Discouraged and outraged, sanitation workers formed a labor union to advocate their rights to higher pay and safer working conditions. Mayor Loeb and the city refused to recognize the labor union, the American Federation of State, County and Municipal Employees (AFSCME) Local 1733 and 1,300 sanitation workers organized a labor strike on February 12, 1968. The strike lasted two months, successfully crippling garbage collection and bringing Dr. Martin Luther King Jr. to Memphis to help with the protests in his nonviolent way. With his presence the community was greatly inspired, and he delivered his infamous "I've Been to the Mountaintop" sermon in the Mason Temple Church, rallying behind the protesters "I may not get there with you. But I want you to know tonight, that we, as a people, will get to the promised land." Dr. King was assassinated the next day. On April 8, 1968 Coretta Scott King flew to Memphis for a nonviolent memorial march to honor Dr. King's life. With 40,000 people, the marchers silently raised protest signs and remembered the man and the cause. Finally, on April 16, 1968 the Memphis Sanitation Strike ended with the help of James Reynolds, a top US labor official. Author Alice Faye Duncan describes the history of the Memphis strike through a child's perspective.

== Reception ==
The book received the 2019 Coretta Scott King Honor Award for Illustration. In its starred review, Kirkus Reviews praised the ability of how the "strong historical details back up the organizing feat…(t)he narrative is set in vignettes that jump between verse and prose, set against Christie’s bold paintings… encapsulates the bravery, intrigue, and compassion that defined a generation, presenting a history that everyone should know: required and inspired." The School Library Journal noted the book as a "a superbly written and illustrated work. A first purchase for public and school libraries.”
