= R. Gregory Christie =

American writer (born 1971)

- Born: July 26, 1971 (age 55); Plainfield, New Jersey, U.S.
- Education: School of Visual Arts (B.F.A.)
- Writing career
- Language: English
- Years active: 1990-present
- Genres: picture books, chapter books, middle grade fiction non-fiction
- Notable works: No Crystal Stair: A Documentary Novel of the Life and Work of Lewis Michaux, Harlem Bookseller, Bad News for Outlaws: The Remarkable Life of Bass Reeves, Deputy U. S. Marshal, Our Children Can Soar: A Celebration of Rosa, Barack, and the Pioneers of Change, Brothers in Hope: The Story of the Lost Boys of Sudan
- Notable awards: Caldecott Honor, Golden Kite Award for Picture Book Text, Golden Kite Award for Picture Book Illustration, Coretta Scott King Award, NAACP Image Award
- Website: www.rgregorychristie.com

Richard Gregory Christie (born July 26, 1971) is an American author and illustrator of picture books, chapter books, middle grade novels, and album covers. He wrote the Coretta Scott King Award-winning books No Crystal Stair: A Documentary Novel of the Life and Work of Lewis Michaux, Harlem Bookseller, Bad News for Outlaws: The Remarkable Life of Bass Reeves, Deputy U. S. Marshal, and Brothers in Hope: The Story of the Lost Boys of Sudan, Only Passing Through, and the NAACP Image Award-winning Our Children Can Soar: A Celebration of Rosa, Barack, and the Pioneers of Change.

He has illustrated more than 60 books.

== Personal life ==
Christie was born on July 26, 1971, in Plainfield, New Jersey, to Ludra V. St. Amant Christie and Gerard A. Christie. His mother was a Louisiana Creole and his father was a pharmacist. He was raised in Scotch Plains, New Jersey, close to the Jerseyland Resort.

He went to St. Bartholomew the Apostle Elementary School. Christie recalls always having an interest in art and drawing characters from comic books from age 5. Christie began painting illustrations of public broadcasting service shows when he was eight years old. While attending Fanwood High School in 1985, he worked for Commercial Art and Supply, formerly known as Art Mart in Plainfield.

He graduated from Fanwood High School in 1989 and attended New York City's School of Visual Arts. During that time, he worked at the Solomon R. Guggenheim museum bookshop in Manhattan and again after its renovation, as a security guard. During his time on the nightshift it took him six months to complete what would become his debut picture book. Christie graduated from the School of Visual Arts in 1993, with a BFA.

Christie currently lives and paints in Atlanta, Georgia.

== Career ==
His first illustration was published in the Star Ledger, the largest circulated newspaper in New Jersey, in 1990, while he was still attending university.

Christie started his career working on album covers for several record companies, including Moserobie Music, Impulse Records, and MCA Records, mostly working on jazz records. His preferred medium is working with acrylics.

His first official illustration job for a book was for a volume of poetry called The Palm of My Heart: Poetry by African American Children, with text by Davida Adedjouma, was published by Lee & Low in 1996 and inspired by the works of the painters Ernie Barnes, Pablo Picasso, and Egyptian art. It won him the Coretta Scott King Award at age 25.

Since then, many of the books he has worked on have gone on to win major awards, including six more Coretta Scott King Honors, a Caldecott Honor, the Schneider Family Book Award, the NAACP Image Award, and the Boston Globe-Horn Book Award. His illustrations have also appeared on HBO Kids and the PBS children's show Between the Lions. As a freelance illustrator, some of his clients include The New Yorker, Rolling Stone, Vibe Magazine, The Wall Street Journal, The New York Times, The Kennedy Center, Reading Is Fundamental, Marlo Thomas, and Pete Seeger.

He cites the works of American artists William H. Johnson and Romare Bearden and Ezra Jack Keats' children's books as the sources of some of his inspiration. Many of Christie's works center on mostly African American historical figures and he has worked on picture book biographies of Muhammad Ali, Sojourner Truth, Billie Holiday, Langston Hughes, Louis Armstrong and Richard Wright, among others.

In 2012, Christie launched a Kickstarter campaign for a combined children's bookstore and arts literary center called GAS ART GIFTS, planned to open in North DeKalb Mall in Decatur, Georgia, but was ultimately unable to meet the goal. After the campaign failed, Christie relaunched the campaign on Indiegogo with a lower goal, reached success and ended up opening the store shortly after. Today it is an online combination of bookstore and art studio specializing in products and services originating from Christie's artwork. Also in 2012, Christie's art was displayed on New York City's subway lines in the form of a poster named "The Subway Soiree". It was up for the entire year as a part of the MTA Arts & Design program. 2013 brought more major commissions for Christie. The biggest of all was the United Postal Service's commission of this artist for the Kwanzaa stamp. Additionally in that year, Christie did the Congo Square New Orleans Jazz Festival poster showcasing Louisiana legend, Buckwheat Zydeco.

In 2017, Christie was attached as the illustrator for the Sweet Blackberry Foundation's animated shorts based on African American pilot Bessie Coleman, inventor Garrett Morgan and ballet dancer Janet Collins, in collaboration with The Fresh Prince of Bel-Air actress Karyn Parsons.

== Selected bibliography ==
Picture books

- text by Patricia Hruby Powell
  - Lift as You Climb: The Story of Ella Baker (McElderry, 2019)
- text by Sudipta Bardhan-Quallen
  - The United States v. Jackie Robinson (Balzer + Bray, 2018)
- text by Alice Faye Duncan
  - Memphis, Martin, and the Mountaintop: The Sanitation Strike of 1968 (Calkins Creek, 2018)
- text by Nikki Grimes
  - One Last Word: Wisdom from the Harlem Renaissance (Bloomsbury, 2017)
- text by Carole Boston Weatherford
  - Freedom in Congo Square (Little Bee Books, 2016)
  - Sugar Hill: Harlem's Historic Neighborhood (Holiday House, 2014)
- text by Vaunda Micheaux Nelson
  - The Book Itch: Freedom, Truth & Harlem's Greatest Bookstore (Carolrhoda, 2015)
  - Bad News for Outlaws: The Remarkable Life of Bass Reeves, Deputy U. S. Marshal (Carolrhoda, 2009)
- self-authored and self-illustrated
  - Mousetropolis (Holiday House, 2015)
- text by Steven Sellers Lapham
  - Philip Reid Saves the Statue of Freedom (Sleeping Bear Press, 2013)
- text by J. Patrick Lewis
  - When Thunder Comes: Poems for Civil Rights Leaders (Chronicle Books, 2012)
- text by Arnold Adoff
  - Roots and Blues: A Celebration (Clarion, 2011)
- text by Don Tate
  - It Jes' Happened: When Bill Traylor Started to Draw (Lee & Low, 2010)
- text by Michelle Cook
  - Our Children Can Soar: A Celebration of Rosa, Barack, and the Pioneers of Change (Bloomsbury, 2009)
- text by Anne Rockwell
  - Open the Door to Liberty!: A Biography of Toussaint L'Ouverture (HMH, 2009)
  - Only Passing Through (Dragonfly Books, 2000)
- text by Muriel Harris Weinstein
  - When Louis Armstrong Taught Me Scat (Chronicle, 2008)
- text by Liza Wheeler
  - Jazz Baby (HMH, 2007)
- text by Dinah Johnson
  - Black Magic (Henry Holt, 2007)
- text by Pete Seeger and Paul DuBois Jacobs
  - The Deaf Musicians (G.P. Putnam's Sons Books for Young Readers, 2006)
- text by Carole Boston Weatherford
  - Dear Mr. Rosenwald (Scholastic, 2006)
- text by Steve Seskin and Allen Shamblin
  - A Chance to Shine (Tricycle Press, 2006)
- text by Beah E. Richards
  - Keep Climbing, Girls (Simon & Schuster, 2006)
- text by Mary Williams
  - Brothers in Hope: The Story of the Lost Boys of Sudan (Lee & Low, 2005)
- text by Pat Sherman
  - The Sun's Daughter (Clarion, 2005)
- text by Tonya Bolden
  - The Champ (Dragonfly Books, 2004)
  - Rock of Ages: A Tribute to the Black Church (Knopf, 2001)
- text by Barbara M. Joosse
  - Hot City (Philomel, 2004)
  - Stars in the Darkness (Chronicle, 2001)
- text by Rukhsana Khan
  - Ruler of the Courtyard (Viking, 2003)
- text byt Tony Medina
  - Love to Langston (Lee & Low, 2002)
  - Deshawn Days (Turtleback Books, 2001)
- text by William Miller
  - Richard Wright and the Library Card (Lee & Low, 1997)
- text by W. Nikola-Lisa
  - America: My Land, Your Land, Our Land (Lee & Low, 1997)
- text by Davida Adedjouma
  - The Palm of My Heart: Poetry by African American Children (Lee & Low, 1996)

Chapter books

- text by Nikki Grimes
  - Dyamonde Daniel Series
    1. Make Way for Dyamonde Daniel (G.P. Putnam's Sons Books for Young Readers, 2000)
    2. Rich (G.P. Putnam's Sons Books for Young Readers, 2009)
    3. Almost Zero (G.P. Putnam's Sons Books for Young Readers, 2010)
    4. Halfway to Perfect (G.P. Putnam's Sons Books for Young Readers, 2012)

Middle grade

- text by Gretchen Woelfle
  - Answering the Cry for Freedom: Stories of African Americans and the American Revolution (Calkins Creek, 2016)
- text by Vaunda Micheaux Nelson
  - No Crystal Stair: A Documentary Novel of the Life and Work of Lewis Michaux, Harlem Bookseller (Carolrhoda, 2012)

Album covers

- Justice System's Summer in the City and Rooftop Soundcheck (1994)
- John Coltrane's Coltrane: The Complete 1961 Village Vanguard Recordings (GRP, 1997)
- Joe Sample's Old Places Old Faces (1996)
- George Benson's A Song for My Brother (1997)

== Awards ==
Nominee

- 2015 Lee & Low New Voices Award It Jes' Happened: When Bill Traylor Started to Draw, text by Don Tate
- 2015 Bluestem Book Award for Rich, text by Nikki Grimes
- 2013 Ezra Jack Keats Book Award for Writer for It Jes' Happened: When Bill Traylor Started to Draw, text by Don Tate
- 2013 CLEL Silver Bell Award for Sing for Jazz Baby, text by Liza Wheeler
- 2012 Ohioana Book Award for Juvenile for Roots and Blues: A Celebration, text by Arnold Adoff
- 2010 Spur Award for Best Storyteller (Illustrated Children's Book) for Bad News for Outlaws: The Remarkable Life of Bass Reeves, Deputy U. S. Marshal, text by Vaunda Micheaux Nelson
- 2008 Theodor Seuss Geisel Award for Jazz Baby, text by Liza Wheeler
- 2008 Charlotte Zolotow Award for Highly Commended Title for Jazz Baby, text by Liza Wheeler

Won

- 2019 Coretta Scott King Award for Illustrator Honor for Memphis, Martin, and the Mountaintop, text by Alice Faye Duncan
- 2017 Coretta Scott King Award for Illustrator Honor Freedom in Congo Square, text by Carole Boston Weatherford
- 2017 Caldecott Honor Freedom in Congo Square, text by Carole Boston Weatherford
- 2016 Coretta Scott King Award for Illustrator Honor The Book Itch: Freedom, Truth & Harlem’s Greatest Bookstore, text by Vaunda Micheaux Nelson
- 2016 New York Times Best Illustrated Children's Books Award, Freedom in Congo Square, text by Carole Boston Weatherford
- 2013 Coretta Scott King Award for Author Honor for No Crystal Stair: A Documentary Novel of the Life and Work of Lewis Michaux, Harlem Bookseller, text by Vaunda Micheaux Nelson
- 2012 Boston Globe-Horn Book Award for No Crystal Stair: A Documentary Novel of the Life and Work of Lewis Michaux, Harlem Bookseller, text by Vaunda Micheaux Nelson
- 2010 Coretta Scott King Award for Author for Bad News for Outlaws: The Remarkable Life of Bass Reeves, Deputy U. S. Marshal, text by Vaunda Micheaux Nelson
- 2009 NAACP Image Award for Children for Our Children Can Soar: A Celebration of Rosa, Barack, and the Pioneers of Change, text by Michelle Cook
- 2007 Schneider Family Book Award for Young Children's Book for The Deaf Musicians, text by Pete Seeger and Paul DuBois Jacobs
- 2006 Coretta Scott King Award for Illustrator Honor for Brothers in Hope: The Story of the Lost Boys of Sudan, text by Mary Williams
- 2002 New York Times Best Illustrated Children's Books Award, Stars in the Darkness, text by Barbara M. Joosse
- 2001 Coretta Scott King Award for Illustrator Honor for Only Passing Through: The Story of Sojourner Truth, text by Anne Rockwell
- 2000 New York Times Best Illustrated Children's Books Award, Only Passing Through: The Story of Sojourner Truth, text by Anne Rockwell
- 1997 Coretta Scott King Award for Illustrator Honor for The Palm of My Heart: Poetry by African American Children, edited by Davida Adedjouma
