= Tanita S. Davis =

American author

- Born: San Francisco, California, U.S.
- Education: Mills College
- Occupation: Author
- Writing career
- Language: English
- Years active: 1999–present
- Genre: Young adult fiction
- Notable work: Mare's War (2009)
- Notable awards: 2010 Coretta Scott King Award
- Website: tanitasdavis.com

Tanita S. Davis is an American author of young adult novels, best known for her NAACP Image Award-nominated and Coretta Scott King Award-winning novel Mare's War, about two teens going on a roadtrip with her WWII veteran grandmother who tells them about her rebellious past.

== Personal life ==
Davis was born in San Francisco, California, and is the youngest of her biological siblings. She has two adopted siblings. She studied Creative Writing with an emphasis in Prose at Mills College, originally not setting out to write for children, but ultimately she wrote an early draft of what would become her fourth published novel, Mare's War, as her thesis. She states that the works of Victor LaValle, Ginu Kamani, and Micheline Aharonian Marcom taught her more about writing than her degree. After graduating from Mills College with an MFA in 2004, she spent five years living in Scotland, where her husband completed his PhD, before moving back to Northern California.

Davis is married and lives in Northern California with her husband.

== Works ==
- Camp Chronicles Series
  1. Summer of Friends (Review & Herald Publishing, 1999)
  2. Summer of Memories (Review & Herald Publishing, 2000)
- A la Carte (Knopf Books for Young Readers, 2008)
- Mare's War (Knopf Books for Young Readers, 2009)
- Happy Families (Knopf Books for Young Readers, 2012)
- Peas and Carrots (Knopf Books for Young Readers, 2016)
- Serena Says (Katherine Tegen Books, 2020)
- Partly Cloudy (Katherine Tegen Books, 2021)
- Figure It Out, Henri Weldon (HarperCollins US, 2023)

== Awards ==
Won

- 2010 Coretta Scott King Honor for Mare's War

Nominated

- 2010 NAACP Image Award in Outstanding Literary Work – Youth/Teens category for Mare's War
