= Jeannette Caines =

American author of children's books

Jeannette Franklin Caines (1937/1938-2004) was an American author of children's books and an advocate for racial minority representation in children's literature. She is best known for her first book, Abby (1973), as well as Chilly Stomach (1986) and Just Us Women (1982), a Reading Rainbow book. She received the National Black Child Developmental Institute's Certificate of Merit and Appreciation and the Charlottesville Lifetime Achievement Award (2004). Caines was also the owner/operator of a small book store located in Charlottesville named The Purple Alligator.

Jeannette Franklin Caines was born in New York in 1937 or 1938, and was raised in Harlem, New York. In 1989, Caines retired and relocated to Charlottesville, Virginia. In 2004, she was diagnosed with cancer and died on July 11. She had two children, one of whom died in 2015.

== Bibliography ==
=== Books ===
- Abby (Harper & Row, 1973).
- Daddy (Harper & Row, 1977)
- Window Wishing (Harper & Row, 1980)
- Just Us Women, illustrated by Pat Cummings (Harper & Row, 1982)
- Chilly Stomach, illustrated by Pat Cummings (HarperCollins, 1986)
- I Need a Lunch Box (Harper & Row, 1988)
