= The Road to Paris =

2006 children's book by Nikki Grimes

The Road to Paris is a 2006 children's fiction chapter book by American writer Nikki Grimes, originally published by G. P. Putnam's Sons.

== Synopsis ==
Paris is a nine-year old, biracial girl who is placed in the foster system. Her white father left the family while she was young, and her mother has problems with alcohol. She and her older brother Malcolm are placed in different homes after running away from an abusive foster family. She is finally placed with the Lincolns, she has two brothers, a sister, and a dog. Here she faces racism and loneliness, yet also learns what it is like to have a loving family.

== Reception ==
The Road to Paris received the Coretta Scott King Award Author Honor in 2007. Kirkus Reviews wrote that Paris's growth was "perfectly paced," even if supporting characters were "not all perfectly realized." Deborah Stevenson at The Bulletin of the Center for Children's Books, disagreed, writing that "the book tells rather than shows and does so episodically, so Paris jerks along from stage to stage without any clear indication of how she gets there."
