= Underground: Finding the Light to Freedom =

2011 children's picture book by Shane W. Evans

Underground
- Author: Shane W. Evans
- Illustrator: Shane W. Evans
- Cover artist: Evans
- Language: English
- Genre: children's books picture books
- Publisher: Roaring Brook Press
- Publication date: January 18, 2011
- Publication place: United States
- Awards: Coretta Scott King Award for Illustrators
- ISBN: 9781596435384

Underground: Finding the Light to Freedom is a children's picture book written and illustrated by Shane W. Evans. It was published by Roaring Brook Press in 2011 and received the Coretta Scott King Award for Illustrators in 2012. The book depicts a 19th-century African-American family of slaves as they escape from a plantation and navigate the Underground Railroad to freedom.

== Awards and honors ==
- School Library Journal's Best Nonfiction Books of 2011
- Coretta Scott King Award for Illustrators (2012)
- American Library Association Notable Children's Books (2012)
- NCTE/CLA Notable Children's Books in the Language Arts (2012)
