= Moses: When Harriet Tubman Led Her People to Freedom =

2006 children's book by Carole Boston Weatherford

- First edition cover (pub. Hyperion Books for Children)
- Author: Carole Boston Weatherford
- Illustrator: Kadir Nelson
- Publication date: September 1, 2006
- Awards: Caldecott honor (2007); Coretta Scott King Award (2007)

Moses: When Harriet Tubman Led Her People to Freedom is a 2006 children's picture book by Carole Boston Weatherford and illustrated by Kadir Nelson, originally published by Hyperion Books for Children. It has received both a Caldecott Honor and the Coretta Scott King Award.

== Synopsis ==
Moses: When Harriet Tubman Led Her People to Freedom is an awarded picture book about Harriet Tubman, one of the most inspiring figures of the Underground Railroad. Harriet leaves her family and plantation behind, led by God, to find free land in the north. She takes nothing but her faith and travels through woods to safety. Along her tiring and long journey, she trusts people who could easily turn her in, sleeps in fear, and most importantly, relies on God. Harriet ultimately escapes the brutal practice of forced servitude and then, after missing and thinking about her family, bravely returns to help many others make the same journey to find freedom.

== Reception ==
Moses was well-received. It has been awarded as a Caldecott Honor book and with the Coretta Scott King Award.

A starred review in Publishers Weekly compliments the book's "elegant design" and the illustration's "intense portraits" and their ability to "convey all the emotion of Tubman's monumental mission." It also applauds the author for the way in which the text was framed, as "an ongoing dialogue between Tubman and God."

Kirkus awarded it a starred review, praising "Nelson’s double-page, full-bleed paintings" that "illuminate both the dire physical and transcendent spiritual journey" that Harriet endures. Kirkus also commends the "elegant free verse" done by author Carole Boston Weatherford.

The New York Times similarly celebrated the three-voice narrative and rich illustrations.
