= Lillie Patterson =

American writer (1917–1999)

Lillie Patterson

Lillie Patterson (May 3, 1917 – March 11, 1999) was an American writer who worked as a school and college librarian in Baltimore, Maryland. She wrote 17 books for children and young adults including Martin Luther King, Jr.: Man of Peace about Rev. Martin Luther King Jr. It won the first Coretta Scott King Award. She also wrote books about the Statue of Liberty, Coretta Scott King, Frederick Douglass, and Booker T. Washington.

She grew up listening to her grandmother telling stories in Hilton Head, South Carolina.

Patterson was African-American. She received a bachelor's degree in elementary education from Hampton University in Hampton, Virginia in the 1940s and a graduate degree in library services from the Catholic University of America in Washington D.C. in the 1950s. She also studied at the Johns Hopkins University and New York University. In 1963 she received the Living Maker of Negro History Award from the Iota Phi Lambda sorority. She also won a Professional Award from the National Association of Negro Business and Professional Women's Clubs in Baltimore and the Helen Keating Award in 1985 from the Church and Synagogue Library Association.

== Works ==
- Booker T. Washington: Leader of His People (1962)
- Meet Miss Liberty (1962)
- Halloween: A Holiday Book (1963)
- Frederick Douglass: Freedom Fighter (1965)
- Birthdays: A Holiday Book (1965)
- Lumberjacks of the North Woods (1967)
- Christmas Feasts and Festivals: A Holiday Book (1968)
- Christmas in America: A Holiday Book (1969)
- Christmas in Britain and Scandinavia (1970)
- Christmas Trick or Treat (1979)
- Jenny, the Halloween Spy (1979)
- The Jack-O'Lantern Trick (1979)
- Sure Hands, Strong Heart: The Life of Daniel Hale Williams (1981)
- David: The Story of a King (1985)
- Martin Luther King, Jr. and the Freedom Movement (1989)
