= Ebele Oseye =

African-American poet and fiction writer

- Born: Ellease Southerland; 1943 (age 82–83); Brooklyn, New York
- Education: BA, MFA
- Alma mater: Columbia University
- Occupations: Writer, Professor
- Writing career
- Notable works: Let the Lion Eat Straw, 1979

Ellease Ebele N. Oseye (formerly known as Ellease Southerland; born 1943, Brooklyn, New York) is an African-American poet and author who received the Gwendolyn Brooks Award for Poetry. She teaches African Literature at Pace University.

== Early life ==
While Oseye was born Ellease Southerland in Brooklyn, New York, her parents were recent transplants from the American South. Her father was Monroe Penrose Southerland who worked as a lay preacher, while her mother, Ellease Dozier, worked in the home, tending to Ellease and her fourteen siblings. Her uncle read poetry at her father's services on Sundays, and her family regularly encouraged reading and writing.

== Education and career ==
Oseye graduated from Queens College in 1965, writing "White Shadows" while a student there. She earned her degree then began social work to support her family after her mother's death from cancer, also in 1965.

Oseye earned her masters in fine arts at Columbia University in 1974. During her masters, and until 1976, Oseye wrote and taught at Columbia University.

By 2015, Oseye was a faculty member in Pace University's Dyson College of Arts and Sciences.

== Writing themes ==
Oseye's work has been seen as "spiritual", as well as connected to her family.

== Selected works ==
- The Magic Sun Spins (1975, poetry collection)
- Let the Lion Eat Straw (1979, autobiographical novel)

== Awards ==
- John Golden Award for Fiction (1964) for White Shadows (novella)
- Gwendolyn Brooks Poetry Award (1972) for “Warlock” (poem)
- Best books of 1979 by the American Library Association for Let the Lion Eat Straw
- Coretta Scott King Award (1980 honor) for Let the Lion Eat Straw
