= Keeping the Night Watch =

2008 poetry book by Hope Anita Smith

- Author: Hope Anita Smith
- Illustrator: E. B. Lewis
- Cover artist: Lewis
- Language: English
- Publisher: Henry Holt and Company
- Publication date: March 18, 2008
- Publication place: United States
- Awards: Coretta Scott King Author Honor Book
- ISBN: 9780805072020
- Preceded by: The Way a Door Closes

Keeping the Night Watch is a children's poetry book written by Hope Anita Smith and illustrated by E. B. Lewis. Published by Henry Holt and Company as the sequel to Smith's The Way a Door Closes, it was a Coretta Scott King Author Honor Book and appeared on several best children's book lists in 2009.

== Summary ==
The book is a series of poems from the perspective of thirteen-year-old C.J. Washington III, the narrator from Smith's 2003 poetry book The Way a Door Closes. While the prequel captures the experiences and emotions of a family abandoned by their father, Keeping the Night Watch explores C.J.'s subsequent struggles with the unexpected return of his father and expands on intersecting issues of adolescence, poverty, and urban life.

== Awards and honors ==
- Coretta Scott King Author Honor Book (2009)
- School Library Journal’s Best Books of 2008
- American Library Association Notable Children's Books (2009)
