= Mildred Pitts Walter =

American children's book writer (1922–2026)

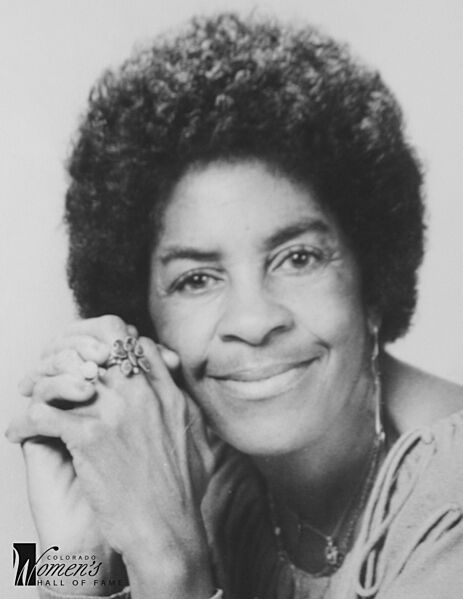
- Pitts Walter in 1996
- Born: Mildred Pitts; September 9, 1922; Sweetville, Beauregard Parish, Louisiana, U.S.
- Died: May 19, 2026 (aged 103); Redwood City, California, U.S.
- Education: Southern University at New Orleans
- Occupations: Educator; writer
- Spouse: Earl Walter (m. 1947; died 1965)
- Children: 2
- Writing career
- Genre: Children's literature

Mildred Pitts Walter (September 9, 1922 – May 19, 2026) was an American children's book writer, known for her works featuring African-American protagonists. Walter has written more than 20 books for young readers, including fiction and nonfiction. Several of her books have won or been named to the honor list of the Coretta Scott King Awards. A native of Louisiana who later moved to Denver, Walter was inducted into the Colorado Women's Hall of Fame in 1996. She published her autobiography, Something Inside So Strong: Life in Pursuit of Choice, Courage, and Change, in 2019.

== Life and career ==
Mildred Pitts was born on September 9, 1922, the youngest of seven children to Paul Pitts, a log cutter, and Mary Pitts, a beautician and midwife. She was born in Sweetville, Louisiana, and raised in nearby Gaytine, both small, segregated sawmill communities in Beauregard Parish, Louisiana, near the city of DeRidder.

She earned a bachelor's degree in English from Southern University at New Orleans. She earned money for tuition by working in the defense industry during World War II. In 1944, following graduation, Walter moved to Los Angeles and worked as a school clerk. She completed certification requirements in elementary education at what is now California State University, Los Angeles.

In Los Angeles, she met her husband, Earl Walter, to whom she was married from 1947 until his death in 1965. Both Mildred and Earl were active in civil rights activism as members of the Congress of Racial Equality (CORE), of which Earl eventually became national vice chairman. They had two sons.

Walter moved to Denver, Colorado, in 1970. She earned a master's degree in education from the Antioch College extension in Denver. Walter worked as a consultant at Western Interstate Commission of Higher Education in Denver, and as a consultant teacher and lecturer at Metro State College in Denver.

Walter turned 100 in September 2022, and died in Redwood City, California, on May 19, 2026, at the age of 103.

== Writing ==
Walter began writing when she realized there were few books for young readers about Black children written by Black authors. Since the publication of her first book in 1969 (Lillie of Watts, about a girl growing up in the Watts neighborhood of Los Angeles), Walter has published over 20 books for children. Lillie of Watts was followed by a sequel, Lillie of Watts Takes a Giant Step (1971). Walter's other works of fiction include Ty's One-Man Band (1980), Justin and the Best Biscuits in the World (1986), and Mariah Loves Rock (1988).

Her nonfiction works include Mississippi Challenge (1992), which describes the history of African Americans in Mississippi from slavery, through the Civil War, Reconstruction, and civil rights activists' efforts to overturn racist voting laws in the state. Publishers Weekly wrote that "Walter's heavily footnoted text may prove somewhat slow going for the general reader, but she has uncovered much eye-opening material." Kirkus called it a "compelling account", and a "sobering message about the real cost of democracy".

Walter's 2011 historical fiction novel, The Second Daughter: The Story of a Slave Girl, is based on the true story of Mum Bett, a former slave who successfully sued for her freedom.

In a 2019 article in The Lion and the Unicorn, Karen Chandler calls The Second Daughter (along with Joyce Hansen's novels that foreground young Black protagonists) "just as relevant, arguably, as they were when they first appeared fifteen or twenty years ago". She adds that these books "offer a much-needed antidote to a U.S. popular culture that conveys the assumption that white persons' actions, beliefs, and values are standard".

The University Press of Mississippi published Walter's autobiography, Something Inside So Strong: Life in Pursuit of Choice, Courage, and Change, in 2019.

== Awards and honors ==
Walter was inducted into the Colorado Women's Hall of Fame in 1996. Her books have earned the following prizes:

- Coretta Scott King Award Winner: Justin and the Best Biscuits in the World (1986)
- Coretta Scott King Award Honors: Because We Are (1983); Trouble's Child (1985); Mississippi Challenge (1992)
- Jane Addams Children's Book Award Honors: Second Daughter: The Story of a Slave Girl (1996)

== Selected works ==
=== Children's fiction ===
- Ty's One-Man Band (1980), ISBN 9780590075800
- My Mama Needs Me (1983), ISBN 9780688016708
- Because We Are (1983), ISBN 9780688022877
- Brother to the Wind (1985), ISBN 9780688038113
- Justin and the Best Biscuits in the World (1986), ISBN 9780688066451
- Second Daughter: The Story of a Slave Girl (1996), ISBN 9780590482820

=== Children's nonfiction ===
- Mississippi Challenge (1992), ISBN 9780027923018
- Kwanzaa: A Family Affair (1995), ISBN 9780688115531

=== Autobiography ===
- Something Inside So Strong: Life in Pursuit of Choice, Courage, and Change (2019), ISBN 9781496825834
