= David Barclay Moore =

American filmmaker and writer

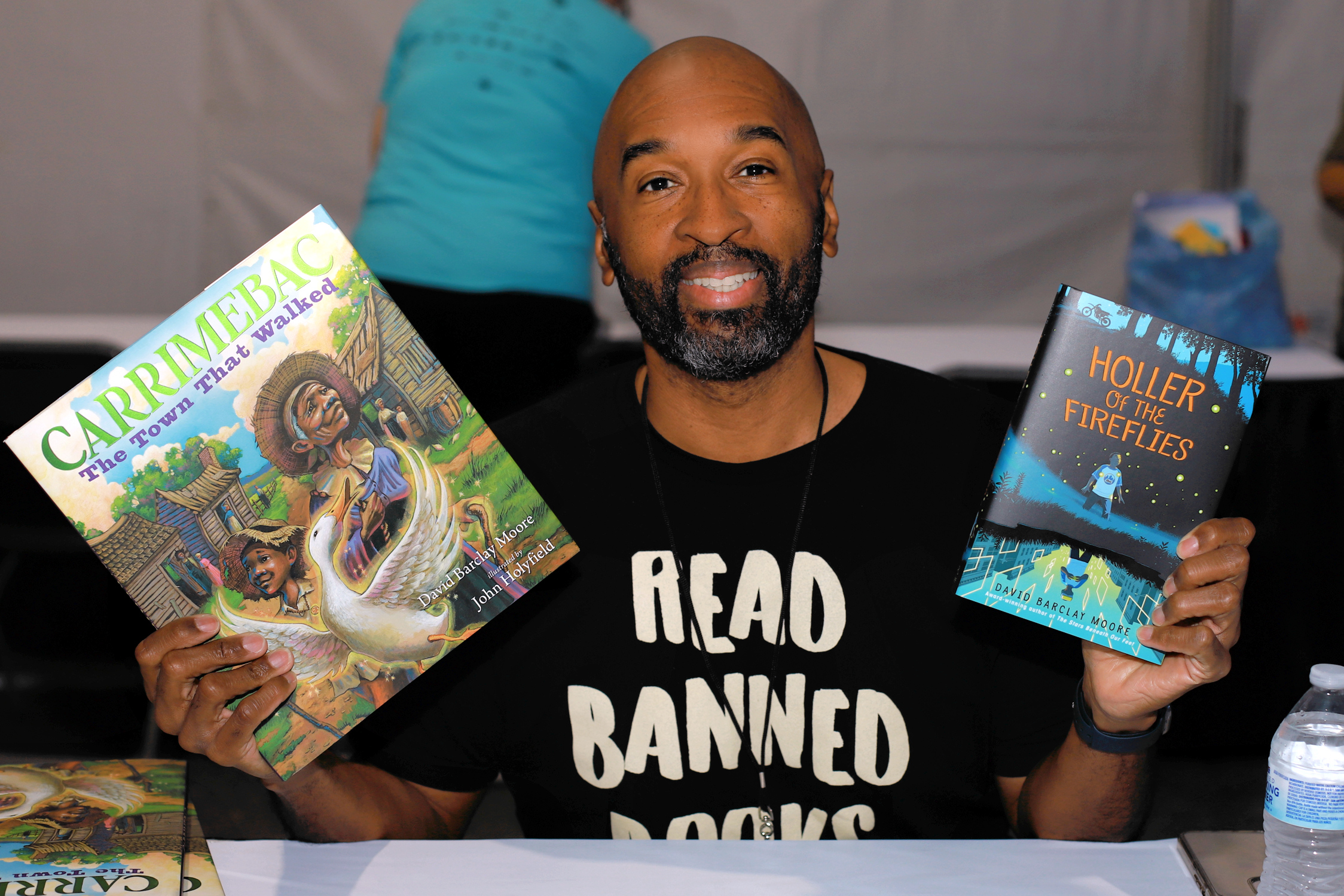
- Moore at the 2022 Texas Book Festival.
- Born: Missouri, U.S.
- Education: Iowa State University; Howard University; L' Universite de Montpellier
- Occupation: Writer
- Writing career
- Language: English
- Genre: children's literature
- Notable work: The Stars Beneath Our Feet
- Notable awards: Coretta Scott King-John Steptoe Author Award for New Talent (2018)
- Website: davidbarclaymoore.com

David Barclay Moore is an American filmmaker and writer. Moore splits his time between Brooklyn, New York and Los Angeles, California. He received the 2018 Coretta Scott King-John Steptoe Author Award for New Talent for his middle grade novel, The Stars Beneath Our Feet.

== Career ==
Moore was raised in Missouri. He studied film at Howard University in Washington, D.C., creative writing at Iowa State University, and language at L'Universite de Montpelier. Early in his career he produced films and did communication work for nonprofit organizations.

Moore's debut novel, The Stars Beneath Our Feet, was published on September 19, 2017, by Knopf Books. It tells the story of a 12-year-old boy from Harlem who is dealing with the aftermath of his older brother's death. The book received recognition from ALA, Booklist, The New York Times, and Publishers Weekly. Moore received the 2018 Coretta Scott King-John Steptoe Author Award for New Talent. The book is being adapted into a screenplay by Michael B. Jordan's production company, Outlier Society Productions, with Moore as the screenwriter and executive producer.

== Personal life ==
Moore is queer.
