= Nikki Grimes =

American writer and illustrator (born 1950)

- Born: October 20, 1950 (age 75); Harlem, New York, U.S.
- Occupations: Writer, artist
- Writing career
- Period: 1977–present
- Genres: Children's picture books and novels
- Notable works: Bronx Masquerade; Barack Obama: Son of Promise, Child of Hope; Danitra Brown
- Notable awards: Coretta Scott King Award (2002); Children's Literature Legacy Award (2017)
- Website: nikkigrimes.com

Nikki Grimes (born October 20, 1950) is an American author of books written for children and young adults, as well as a poet and journalist.

== Background and career ==
Grimes was born on October 20, 1950, in Harlem, New York. In a conversation with a Reading Is Fundamental interviewer, she stated: "Books were my survival tools. They were how I got by, and how I coped with things. Books carried me away."

Grimes has been a guest lecturer at international schools in Sweden, Tanzania, China, and Russia. She has written articles for magazines such as Today's Christian Woman and Essence. Grimes' interests and talents are diverse and include photography, fiber art, and beading.

Grimes currently resides in Corona, California, and continues to write poetry and books for children and young adults. She is on the board of directors for the National Children's Book and Literacy Alliance. Grimes' work has earned her honors and recognition from a number of prestigious organizations.

Grimes' novel Bronx Masquerade was named the Coretta Scott King Award book in 2002. The Coretta Scott King Award is "given to African-American authors and illustrators for outstanding inspirational and educational contributions."

In January 2017, Grimes was awarded the Laura Ingalls Wilder Award, which "honors an author or illustrator whose books, published in the United States, have made, over a period of years, a substantial and lasting contribution to literature for children." Following controversy surrounding Laura Ingalls Wilder's stereotypical portrayals of Indigenous peoples and the subsequent changing of the medal's name to the Children's Literature Legacy Award. However, Grimes' work was criticized for alleged antisemitism.

== Works ==
=== Published works ===
- Growin': a novel (1977), illustrated by Charles Lilly
- Something on My Mind (1978), art by Tom Feelings
- Malcolm X: A Force for Change (1992)
- From a Child's Heart (1993), illustrated by Brenda Joysmith
- Meet Danitra Brown (1994), illustrated by Floyd Cooper (Coretta Scott King Illustrator Honor Book)
- Portrait of Mary (1994)
- Come Sunday (1996), illustrated by Michael Bryant
- Wild, Wild Hair (1997), illustrated by George Cephas Ford
- Jazmin's Notebook (1998) (Coretta Scott King Author Honor Book)
- A Dime a Dozen (1998), illustrated by Angelo
- My Man Blue (1999), illustrated by Jerome Lagarrigue (Marion Vannett Ridgway Award)
- Hopscotch Love (1999), illustrated by Melodye Benson Rosales
- At Break of Day (1999), illustrated by Paul Morin
- Aneesa Lee and the Weaver's Gift (2000), illustrated by Ashley Bryan
- Is It Far to Zanzibar? (2000), illustrated by Betsy Lewin
- Shoe Magic (2001), illustrated by Terry Widener
- A Pocketful of Poems (2001), illustrated by Javaka Steptoe
- Under the Christmas Tree (2002), illustrated by Kadir Nelson
- Danitra Brown Leaves Town (2002), illustrated by Floyd Cooper
- Stepping Out with Grandma Mac (2002), illustrated by Angelo
- C Is for City (2002), illustrated by Pat Cummings
- When Daddy Prays (2002), illustrated by Tim Ladwig
- Bronx Masquerade (2002), (Coretta Scott King Author Award) (Best Children's Book of 2002, Association of Theological Booksellers)
- Talkin' About Bessie (2002), illustrated by E.B. Lewis (Coretta Scott King Illustrator Award, Author Honor Book)
- Tai Chi Morning (2004), illustrated by Ed Young
- A Day with Daddy (2004), illustrated by Nicole Tadgell
- What Is Goodbye? (2004), illustrated by Raul Colón (ALA Notable Book)
- It's Raining Laughter, photographs by Myles C. Pinkney
- At Jerusalem's Gate, illustrated by David Frampton
- Danitra Brown, Class Clown (2005), illustrated by E.B. Lewis
- Dark Sons (2005, reissued 2010), (Coretta Scott King Author Honor Book)
- Thanks a Million (2006), illustrated by Cozbi A. Carrera
- Welcome, Precious (2006), illustrated by Bryan Collier
- The Road to Paris (2006), (Coretta Scott King Author Honor Book)
- When Gorilla Goes Walking (2007), illustrate by Shane Evans
- Oh, Brother! (2007), illustrated by Mike Benny
- Barack Obama: Son of Promise, Child of Hope (2008), illustrated by Bryan Collier (NY Times Bestseller)
- Out of the Dark: Nikki Grimes, Author at Work (2009)
- Make Way for Dyamonde Daniel (2009), illustrated by R. Gregory Christie
- Rich: a Dyamonde Daniel Book (2009), illustrated by R. Gregory Christie
- Voices of Christmas (2009), illustrated by Eric Velasquez
- A Girl Named Mister (2011)
- Almost Zero: a Dyamonde Daniel Book (2010), illustrated by R. Gregory Christie
- Planet Middle School (2011)
- Halfway to Perfect (2012)
- Words with Wings (2013), Coretta Scott King Honor book
- Chasing Freedom (2015), illustrated by Michele Wood
- Poems in the Attic (2015), illustrated by Elizabeth Zunon
- Garvey's Choice (2016)
- One Last Word: Wisdom from the Harlem Renaissance (2017), various artists
- The Watcher (2017), illustrated by Bryan Collier
- Ordinary Hazards: a Memoir (2019)
- Bedtime for Sweet Creatures (2020), illustrated by Elizabeth Zunon
- Southwest Sunrise (2020), illustrated by Wendell Minor
- Kamala Harris: Rooted in Justice (2020), illustrated by Laura Freeman
- Off to See the Sea (2021), illustrated by Elizabeth Zunon

== Awards and honors ==
- 1993 NAACP Image Award Finalist for Malcolm X: a Force for Change
- 2003 Coretta Scott King Author Award for Bronx Masquerade
- 2006 NCTE Award for Excellence in Poetry for Children
- 2011 Horace Mann Upstanders Award for Almost Zero: a Dyamonde Daniel Book
- 2012 NAACP Image Award for Barack Obama: Son of Promise, Child of Hope
- 2016 Virginia Hamilton Literacy Award
- 2017 Myra Cohn Livingston Award for Poetry for Garvey's Choice
- 2017 Laura Ingalls Wilder Medal
- 2017 Children's Literature Legacy Award
- 2018 Arnold Adoff Poetry Award for Middle Graders for One Last Word
- 2018 Claudia Lewis Poetry Award for One Last Word
- 2018 Lee Bennett Hopkins Poetry Award for One Last Word
- 2020 Arnold Adoff Poetry Award for Teens for Ordinary Hazards
- 2026 Young People's Poet Laureate

Grimes has received numerous Honor Awards and book lists including Coretta Scott King Honors; Arnold Adoff Poetry Honor; ALA Notable Books; Lee Bennett Hopkins Poetry Award Honor; Boston Globe-Horn Book Honor; Horn Book Fanfare; VOYA Non-Fiction Honor; The Lion & The Unicorn Award for Excellence in North American Poetry; International Youth Library White Ravens List; Notable Books for a Global Society.
