= Dorothy Robinson =

Canadian missionary teacher and Girl Guide leader

- Robinson from a 1952 newspaper
- Born: Dorothy Lydia Robinson; 30 January 1916; Carleton County, Ontario, Canada
- Died: May 1998; Chichester, England
- Education: Anglican Teachers Training College, Toronto; Trinity College, Toronto
- Occupation: Teacher

Dorothy Robinson (30 January 1916 – May 1998) was a Canadian missionary, teacher and Girl Guide and Boy Scout leader. She taught in Inuit communities across the Arctic for over 25 years, opening the first all-Inuit day school in Tuktoyaktuk, Northwest Territories in 1948, where she ran "the world's most northernmost company of Girl Guides" and Boy Scouts and possibly "the most northernly school in the world." She also taught in Nazareth and Uganda.

== Personal life and education ==
Robinson was the only child of Ernest Walter Payne Robinson, a surveyor, and mother Mercy Fitch McLaughlin. As a child she was heavily involved in the Girl Guides. Robinson graduated from the Anglican Teachers Training College and earned a degree in theology from Trinity College, Toronto in 1952, where she also won the James Scott prize for "outstanding work". In 1953, Robinson received the Queen Elizabeth II Coronation Medal for her educational work. In the 1960s she studied at the Bossey Ecumenical Institute in Switzerland.

== Career ==
=== Arctic ===
Robinson was fascinated by Inuit culture from a very young age. In a 1956 interview she said, "I remember seeing [the silent film] Nanook of the North when I was very young and that influenced me to a great extent.

From 1938 she spent over 25 years teaching in Inuit communities at Anglican mission schools across the Arctic, including James Bay, Aklavik, Tuktoyaktuk, Moose Factory and Pangnirtung on Baffin Island. From 1938 to 1941 she taught at Bishop Horton Memorial School at Moose Factory, Hudson Bay. Between 1942 and 1946 she taught at All Saints' School in Aklavik. In 1952 she was on the staff of the Education and Welfare Services of the Department of Northern Affairs and National Resources. In this role she was based at a school with 27 students in Tuktoyaktuk. The school, situated at the mouth of the Mackenzie River, received supplies only once a year. As well as teaching, Robinson was also a nurse, having received training from St John Ambulance. In 1952 she was interviewed by the BBC's In Town Tonight about her experience in the Arctic. In 1958 she moved to a school on Baffin Island.

In the 1960s she was diocesan director of religious education at Sir Alexander Mackenzie School in Sarnia, Ontario. In 1961 Robinson and Prudence Hockin, a nurse, were the only two women to attend the first Arctic Diocesan Synod in Aklavik and in 1964 she was Diocesan president for Inuvik.

Robinson provided line drawings to accompany Kaare Rodahl's books The Last of the Few (1963) and Between Two Worlds: A Doctor's Log-Book of Life Among the Alaskan Eskimos (1964).

=== Nazareth ===
In 1965 Robinson was invited by the Archbishop of Jerusalem to Nazareth to train teachers in the Evangelical Episcopal Church. She lived there for five years and experienced the 1967 Six-Day War first-hand.

=== Uganda ===
In 1971 she was invited to Mbale, Uganda, to provide healthcare and a Christian education and to teach English to 18 men from the Sudan who were preparing for their ordination into the Episcopal Church of Sudan. After Idi Amin began "making menacing moves towards Christian missionaries" she returned to Canada in late 1972.

=== Retirement ===
After spending six months travelling across Canada giving talks about her missionary life, she retired to Kyrenia, Cyprus. She died in Chichester, England in 1998.

== Guides, Scouts and Sea Scouts ==
In his 1956 book The Mysterious North, the Canadian author Pierre Berton wrote about meeting Robinson – together with her mother who was visiting at the time – at her Tuktoyaktuk school. He quoted Robinson's mother as saying, "Dorothy was always a great one for the Girl Guides."

As a member of the 18th Guide company, Ottawa, Robinson was the first member to earn a First Class badge in 1932. In 1935 she received an award for having not missed a Guide meeting in five years. She held a certificate in woodworking, a bronze medal in life saving and a medallion from St John Ambulance. In 1937 she became Brown Owl of 26th Brownie pack, Ottawa and was also an active member of the Sea Scouts.

In 1948 Robinson established a Scout troop and Girl Guide company at the Tuktoyaktuk school, making them the world's most northerly Scout and Guide groups, the title previously having been held by groups in Aklavik. Robinson subsequently became "one of the few women in the world to wear the Boy Scout medal" which was awarded "in the extraordinary case where a woman has taken over Cubmaster and Scoutmaster duties." By 1950 there were 20 children involved in the Guide and Scout activities in Tuktoyaktuk, when a newspaper article noted that "Camping out to them is less of a novelty. They are accustomed to following their parents on their periodic hunting trips in the Arctic snows."
