= Demetria Tucker =

American youth services librarian

Demetria Renee Tucker is Senior Family and Youth Librarian at Newport News Public Library, known for her youth programming work. In 2013, she was honored at the White House with the 2013 National Arts and Humanities Youth Program Award for her work with the Pearl Bailey Library Youth Program. The program was designed to "expand knowledge of literature and engage youth as stakeholders in the library".

She was the winner of the Virginia Hamilton Award for Lifetime Achievement from the American Library Association in 2013 and was a 2007 Forest Park Elementary School Teacher of the Year in Roanoke, Virginia.

Tucker was born in Greenville, North Carolina to William A. Tucker and Helen Hemby Tucker, and had four siblings. She earned a BA in Sociology from North Carolina Agricultural and Technical State University in Greensboro in 1972 and is a member of Lamba Omega chapter of Alpha Kappa Alpha sorority.

Tucker attended library school at University of North Carolina at Chapel Hill School of Information and Library Science where she received her MLIS in 1978. The school awarded her with their Distinguished Alumna Award in 2014. She worked for the Roanoke public library system from 1972 through 2004, when she went to work for City of Roanoke Public Schools. She has been at the Newport News Public Library since 2008.
