= Bryan Collier =

American writer and illustrator (born 1967)

Bryan Collier (born 1967) is an American writer and illustrator known best for illustrating children's books. He won both the Coretta Scott King Award as an illustrator and the Ezra Jack Keats New Illustrator Award for Uptown (Holt, 2000), the first book he both wrote and illustrated. He has won six Coretta Scott King Awards as illustrator and he is a four-time Caldecott Honor recipient.

For his lifetime contribution as a children's illustrator, Collier was the U.S. illustrator nominee for the biennial, international Hans Christian Andersen Award in 2014.

== Biography ==
Bryan Collier was raised in Pocomoke City near the southern border of Maryland Eastern Shore. As a child he had a great collection of quality children's books that his mom, a Head Start teacher, would bring home. Some of his favorites were Whistle for Willie and The Snowy Day by Ezra Jack Keats, Harold and the Purple Crayon by Crockett Johnson, and Where the Wild Things Are by Maurice Sendak. He said that he wouldn't read the books at first; he would only look at the images to tell him the story.

Collier started working with watercolors and photo collage when he was 15 years old. He said it was something that sort of clicked in him overnight and the next day he starting painting.

While in high school he won first place in a Congressional Competition and his painting was displayed in the Capitol Building in Washington D.C. for a year.

Collier received a scholarship through a national talent competition through the Pratt Institute in New York City, one of the leading art schools in the United States. He later graduated from Pratt with honors.

While at Pratt, he was a volunteer at the Harlem Horizon Art Studio located within the Harlem Hospital Center. The center is open to the children of the hospital as well as the children of the community. He later became the Program Director, a position he held for twelve years.

Collier said that one of the biggest reasons for wanting to become a part of children's books was because of an experience he had in 1995 at a book store where the books he saw did not look or feel or sound like him or his children. He thought that he could do better, so that's what he worked towards.

Collier continues to be active at the Harlem Horizon Art Studio but now as a volunteer. He believes it's important to be a positive role model for kids. He says, "It gives the community, the schools, the kids, and the parents the opportunity to come together for a very positive uplifting cause—the building and re-building of self-esteem, teaching the appreciation of art, and keeping the kids connected and involved and away from negative influences." He also spends time visiting schools to talk with teachers, librarians, and students about books and art.

== Illustration style ==
Collier uses a unique technique of combining watercolors with collage.

The first thing he does before creating the illustrations is a photo shoot of either his family or friends acting out the story. Sometimes he uses up to ten rolls of film. He believes that by having people act out the story, it shows him the important gestures that illuminate the scenes.

Next, he carefully selects some of the photographs that best fit the text and begins sketching. After the sketching is complete, he begins painting in watercolor and the collage follows. He gets pieces for his collage mostly from magazines like Elle.

== Awards ==
Collier is a four-time recipient of a Caldecott Honor: Martin's Big Words, Rosa, Dave the Potter, and Trombone Shorty. Those four books are among nine for which Collier has received Coretta Scott King Award recognition as the winner or honor recipient. The annual Coretta Scott King Awards, one for an illustrator and one for a writer, recognize the year's "most distinguished portrayal of African American experience in literature for children or teens".

Coretta Scott King Award, Illustrator, winner or honor recipient (9):

- 2001 Uptown by Bryan Collier
- 2001 honor recipient, Freedom River by Doreen Rappaport
- 2002 honor recipient, Martin's Big Words: The Life of Martin Luther King, Jr. by Doreen Rappaport
- 2003 honor recipient, Visiting Langston by Willie Perdomo
- 2006 Rosa by Nikki Giovanni
- 2011 Dave the Potter: Artist, Poet, Slave by Laban Carrick Hill
- 2013 I, Too, Am America by Langston Hughes
- 2014 Knock Knock: My Dad's Dream for Me, written by Daniel Beaty
- 2016 Trombone Shorty, written by Troy Andrews and Bill Taylor

For Uptown, which he also wrote, Collier won the Ezra Jack Keats New Illustrator Award.

== Books illustrated ==
- My Country, 'Tis of Thee, written by Claire Rudolf Murphy, 2014
- Knock Knock: My Dad's Dream for Me written by Daniel Beaty, 2013
- Fifty Cents and a Dream: Young Booker T. Washington (written by Jabari Asim), 2012
- I, Too, Am America by Langston Hughes, 2012
- Dave the Potter: Artist, Poet, Slave by Laban Carrick Hill, 2011
- Your Moon, My Moon: to a Faraway Child (written by Patricia MacLachlan), Simon & Schuster, 2011
- Dave the Potter: Artist, Poet, Slave (written by Laban Carrick Hill), Little, Brown 2010
- Doo-Wop Pop (written by Roni Schotter), Amistad, 2008
- Lincoln and Douglass: An American Friendship (written by Nikki Giovanni), Henry Holt and Co., 2008
- Barack Obama: Son of a Promise, Child of Hope (written by Nikki Grimes), Simon & Schuster, 2008
- Lift Every Voice and Sing (written by James Weldon Johnson), Amistad, 2007
- Cherish Today: A Celebration of Life's Moments (written by Kristina Evans), Jump at the Sun, 2007
- 12 Rounds to Glory: The Story of Muhammad Ali (written by Charles R. Jr Smith), Candlewick 2007
- Welcome, Precious (written by Nikki Grimes), Orchard Books / a division of Scholastic Press, 2006
- Rosa (written by Nikki Giovanni), Henry Holt and Company, 2005
- John's Secret Dreams: The Life of John Lennon (written by Doreen Rappaport), Jump at the Sun / Hyperion Books for Children, 2004
- Skull Talks Back and Other Haunting Tales (written by Zora Neale Hurston), HarperCollins Publishers, 2004
- What's the Hurry Fox?: And Other Animal Stories (collected by Zora Neale Hurston; adapted by Joyce Carol Thomas), HarperCollins Publishers, 2004
- I'm Your Child, God: Prayers for Children and Teenagers (written by Marian Wright Edelman), Jump at the Sun / Hyperion Books for Children, 2002
- Kiss it Up to God (selected poems by Nadine Mozon), Fly By Night Press, 2002
- Visiting Langston(written by Willie Perdomo), Henry Holt and Company, 2002
- Jump at the Sun Treasury: An African American Picture Book Collection (an anthology compiled by Andrea Davis Pinkney), Jump at the Sun / Hyperion Books for Children, 2001
- Martin's Big Words: The Life of Dr. Martin Luther King, Jr. (written by Doreen Rappaport), Jump at the Sun / Hyperion Books for Children, 2001
- A Freedom River (written by Doreen Rappaport), Jump at the Sun / Hyperion Books for Children, 2000
- Uptown (written by Bryan Collier), Henry Holt and Company, 2000
- These Hands (written by Hope Lynn Price), Hyperion Books for Children, 1999
