= The Tomfoolery Show =

1970–1971 British-American animated comedy television series

The Tomfoolery Show is a 1970–1971 American animated comedy television series, based on the works of Edward Lear which aired on NBC. The animation was done at the Halas and Batchelor Studios in London and Stroud. Though the works of other writers were also used, notably Lewis Carroll and Ogden Nash, Lear's works were the main source, and characters like the Yongy-Bonghy-Bo and the Umbrageous Umbrella Maker were all Lear creations. Other characters included the Enthusiastic Elephant, the Fizzgiggious Fish, and the Scroobious Snake. The show's writing was credited to Lear, Carroll, and Romeo Muller, the latter being responsible for the adaptations of the earlier writers' works. Some original material was also written based on characters created by Lear, although much of the material was a straight recital of poems and limericks or songs using Lear's poems set to music. A recurring joke had a delivery boy running around, trying to deliver a large plant and shouting, "Plant for Mrs Discobolus!"

The show also included characters from Gelett Burgess' work, including "The Purple Cow" and the Goops.

Some of the gags were based on Abbott and Costello skits which involved one of the regular characters in troubling situations.

A cooking lesson for a silly recipe was also presented in each episode. Two memorable examples were:-

- "Baked Alaska" where a map of the US state of Alaska was cut out of an atlas and placed in the oven.
- "Upside-down cake" where the entire cartoon image was literally turned upside-down in order to carry out the cooking lesson.

The series was produced by Rankin/Bass, (formerly Videocraft International), who also made the Rudolph the Red-Nosed Reindeer and Frosty the Snowman television specials.

17 episodes were broadcast from September 12, 1970 to September 4, 1971, featuring the voices of Peter Hawkins, Bernard Spear, and the Maury Laws Singers.

== Reception ==
In Children's Television: The First Thirty-five Years, George W. Woolery said, "A bit too literary and lofty, Tomfoolery was a noble failure." David Perlmutter agreed in The Encyclopedia of American Animated TV Shows, saying that the show was "a failed attempt... The problem was that the approach to the material did not do it justice — the program was structured in the style of a revue à la Rowan & Martin's Laugh-In rather than a proper narrative...The odd mélange lasted only a year on the air despite its noble intent."
