= Montgomery Block =

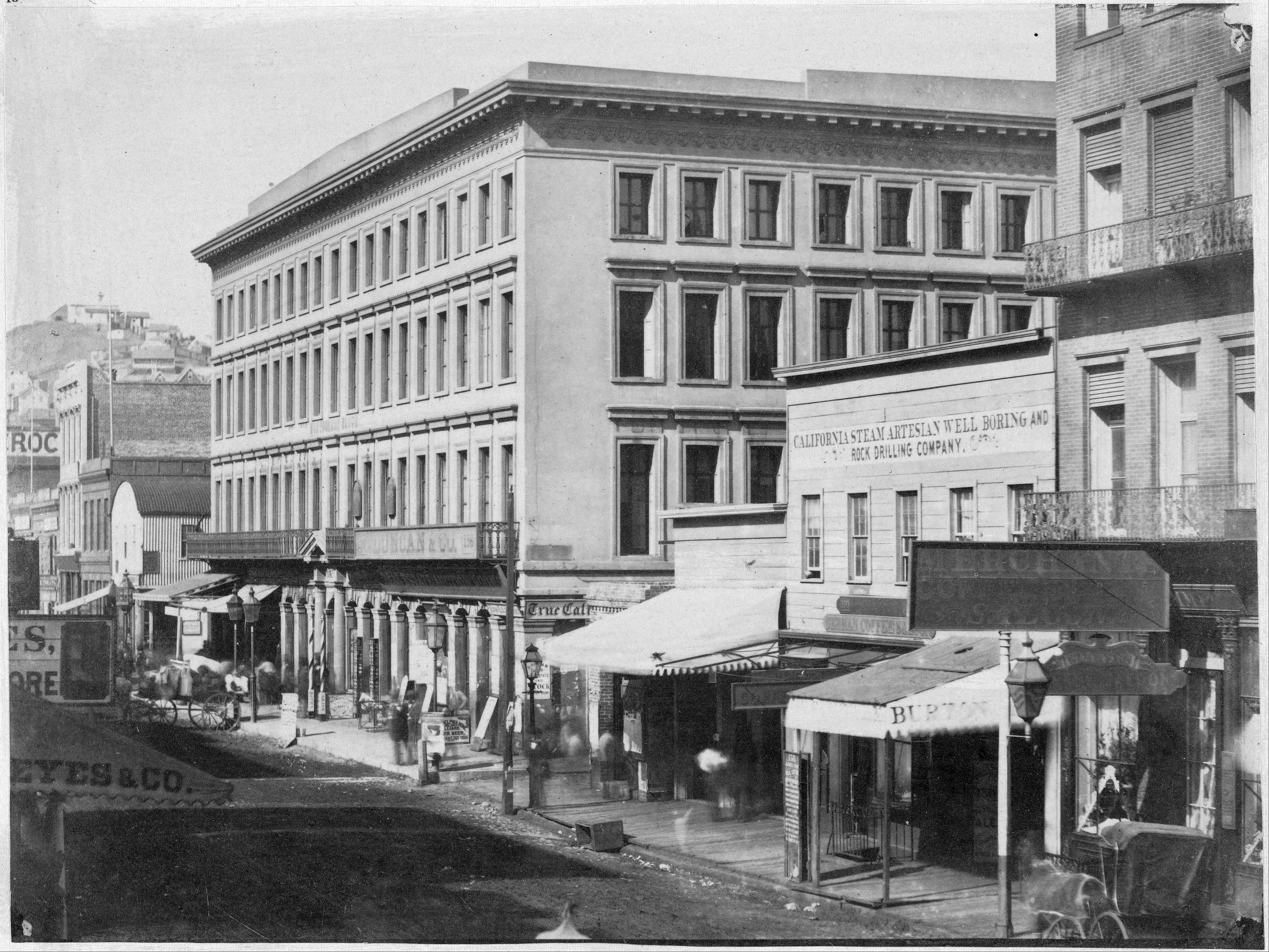
- The Montgomery Block in 1862

- Location within San Francisco County
- 37.795047°N 122.403122°W
- Location: 628 Montgomery Street, San Francisco, California, U.S.

California Historical Landmark
- Designated: March 29, 1933
- Reference no.: 80

The Montgomery Block, also known as Monkey Block and Halleck's Folly, was a historic building active from 1853 to 1959, and was located in San Francisco, California. It was San Francisco's first fireproof and earthquake resistant building. It came to be known as a Bohemian center, from the late 19th to the middle of the 20th century.

Montgomery Block and later the site has been a registered California Historical Landmark since March 29, 1933.

== History ==
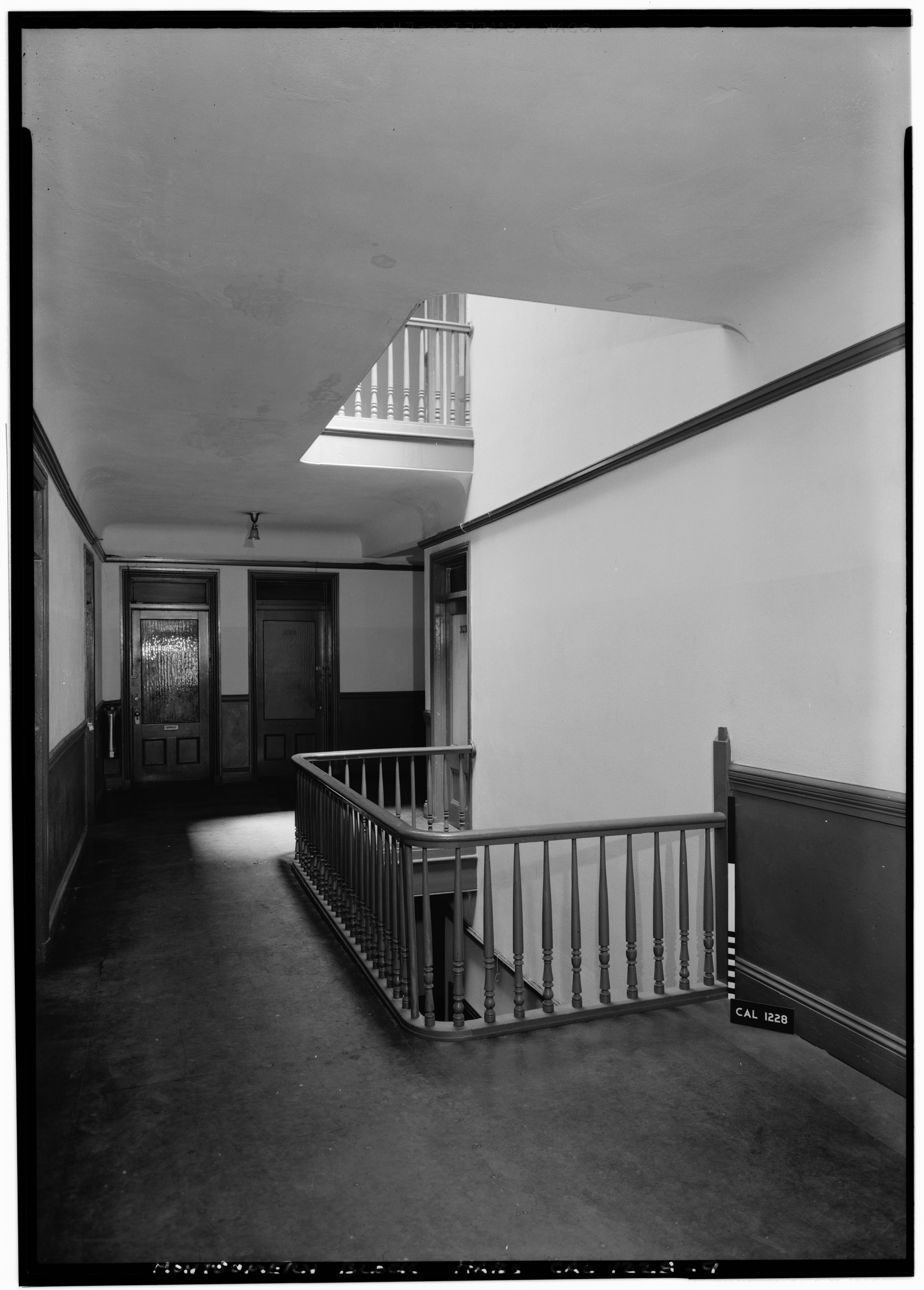
The interior of the building in 1958

It was located at 628 Montgomery Street, on the southeast corner of its intersection with Washington Street, today the location of the Transamerica Pyramid.

The four-story building was erected in 1853 by Henry Wager Halleck, later general in chief of the Union Army in the Civil War, in the "Barbary Coast" red-light district. The four-stories Montgomery Block was the tallest building west of the Mississippi River when it was built in 1853. It was designed by architect G.P. Cummings. San Franciscans called it "Halleck's Folly" because it was built on a raft of redwood logs.

Also known as the Monkey Block, from 'Monty', it housed many well-known lawyers, financiers, writers, actors, and artists. It also hosted many frequenters of Coppa's restaurant, site of Goops murals, and illustrious visitors, among them The Crowd literary group, Jack London, George Sterling, Lola Montez, Lotta Crabtree, Gelett Burgess (and 'Les Jeunes'), Maynard Dixon, Frank Norris, Ambrose Bierce, Bret Harte, the Edwin Booths, and Mark Twain.

On May 14, 1856, the editor of the Daily Evening Bulletin, James King of William, died in the Montgomery Block, having been shot by James P. Casey, a city supervisor who felt slighted by King's anti-corruption crusading journalism.

For a short time in 1878, the California Supreme Court was located on the Montgomery Block.

The building survived the 1906 earthquake and fire.

== Demolition and legacy ==
The Montgomery Block was demolished in 1959, even though a preservation movement had begun to emerge in San Francisco. It was replaced by a parking lot and later, the Transamerica Pyramid.

Historian Robert O’Brien had warned "Anyone who tears down the Montgomery Block is tearing down more than four stories of bricks: he is destroying one of the last monuments to a brave city, and many are the reproachful ghosts that would haunt him". Author Helen Holdredge said "it is incredible to me that San Franciscans should be so little regardful of their past - every room of that building is filled with history".

The building is remembered for its historic importance as a bohemian center of the city. At his inauguration as Poet Laureate of San Francisco in 1998, Lawrence Ferlinghetti mentioned "the classic old Montgomery Block building, the most famous literary and artistic structure in the West".
