= Modernist Journals Project =

Online database of periodicals

The Modernist Journals Project (MJP) was created in 1995 at Brown University in order to create a database of digitized periodicals connected with the period loosely associated with modernism. The University of Tulsa joined in 2003. The MJP's website states:

The Modernist Journals Project is a multi-faceted project that aims to be a major resource for the study of modernism and its rise in the English-speaking world, with periodical literature as its central concern. The historical scope of the project has a chronological range of 1890 to 1922, and a geographical range that extends to wherever English language periodicals were published. With magazines at its core, the MJP also offers a range of genres that extends to the digital publication of books directly connected to modernist periodicals and other supporting materials for periodical study.

We end at 1922 for both intellectual and practical reasons. The practical reason is that copyright becomes an issue with publications from 1923 onward. The intellectual reason is that most scholars consider modernism to be fully fledged in 1922, a date marked by the publication of James Joyce's Ulysses, Virginia Woolf’s Jacob’s Room, and T. S. Eliot's The Waste Land. We believe the materials on the MJP website will show how essential magazines were to modernism's rise.

The journals that the MJP has digitized are all available to the public, for free, on its website, where PDFs of the following magazines can be downloaded:

== Magazines covered ==
- BLAST 1 & 2 (1914–1915)
- The Blue Review (1913) Initially called Rhythm)
- Camera Work (1903–1917)
- Coterie (1919–1921)
- The Crisis: A Record of the Darker Races (1910–1922)
- Dana: An Irish Magazine of Independent Thought (1904–1905)
- The Dome: A Quarterly Containing Examples of All the Arts (1897–1898)
- The Egoist (1914–1919)
- The English Review (1908–1910)
- The Freewoman (1911–1912)
- The Little Review (1914–1922)
- The Masses (1911–1917)
- McClure's Magazine (1900–1910)
- The New Age (1907–1922)
- The New Freewoman (1913)
- Others: A Magazine of the New Verse (1915–1919)
- The Owl (1919–1923)
- Le Petit Journal des Refusees (1896)
- Poetry: A Magazine of Verse (1912–1922)
- Rhythm: Art Music Literature Quarterly (1911–1912)
- Scribner's Magazine (1910–1922)
- The Seven Arts (1916–1917)
- The Smart Set (1913–1922)
- The Tyro: A Review of the Arts of Painting Sculpture and Design (1921–1922)
- Wheels: An Anthology of Verse (1916–1921)
- The 1910 Collection (single issues of 24 magazines published "on or about December 1910")
