= Gelett Burgess Children's Book Award =

- Awarded for: Presented annually to family-friendly books that inspire imagination and creativity.
- Country: United States
- Presented by: The Gelett Burgess Center for Creative Expression
- First award: 2011
- Website: Gelett Burgess Children's Book Award - official page

The Gelett Burgess Children's Book Award is an annual award presented by the Gelett Burgess Center for Creative Expression. Named for Gelett Burgess, an artist and writer famous for his humorous Goops series (1900-1950), this award recognizes outstanding books that inspire imagination and creativity, and helps support childhood literacy and lifelong reading.

== History ==
The first award was granted in 2011 when Pat Mora won Book of the Year with Gracias Thanks. In addition to the Book of the Year and several Burgess Honors, awards are granted each year in 40 categories, within 4 distinct groups: Lifestyle, Arts and Letters, Society and Culture, and Education. The resulting list of award-winning titles is promoted throughout the year with additional activity and lesson plan resources made available.

The Gelett Burgess Children's Book Award seal was designed by the artist himself as a child. He made an early mark on the world by carving his initials, in the form of a monogram based on the Phoenician alphabet, on nearly every church steeple in Boston. (Author's full name is Frank Gelett Burgess)

== Eligibility and Criteria ==
- All English-language titles, North American or International may be submitted as long as the books are available to the general public (i.e., retail outlets, catalog, Amazon or manufacturer websites). Non-English language titles may be submitted to the "Foreign Language Title" category.
- Self-published and small press titles are permitted as long as they meet these guidelines.
- Books may be submitted by the publisher, author, illustrator, publicist, or anyone else working with the title.
- All items submitted for review must be of a family-friendly nature, and suitable for general audiences.
- Entries must be published during the preceding three years.

== Recipients ==
A number of international celebrities have received the Gelett Burgess Children's Book award, including figure skater Kristi Yamaguchi, comedic actor Jim Carrey, and film director John Fusco.

Year	Work	Recipient	Title	Citation
2017	author	Pamela Zagarenski	The Whisper	Winner
2016	author	Vaunda Micheaux Nelson	The Book Itch	Winner
2016	author	Elly Mackay	Butterfly Park	Honor
2016	author	David Miles	Book	Honor
2016	author	JonArno Lawson	Sidewalk Flowers	Honor
2016	author	Betsy R. Rosenthal	An Ambush of Tigers	Honor
2014	author	Marla Frazee	The Farmer and the Clown	Winner
2014	author	Jen Bryant	The Right Word: Roget and His Thesaurus	Honor
2014	author	Kobi Yamada	What Do You Do With An Idea?	Honor
2013	author	Emily Winfield Martin	Dream Animals	Winner
2013	author	Jim Carrey	How Roland Rolls	Honor
2013	author	Roberto Aliaga	A Night Time Story	Honor
2013	author	Madelain Westermann	Island of the Invisible Being	Honor
2013	author	Karina Wolf	The Insomniacs	Honor
2012	author	Helen Ward	Snutt the Ift	Winner
2012	author	Naoko Stoop	Red Knit Cap Girl	Honor
2012	author	John Fusco	Little Monk and the Mantis	Honor
2011	author	Pat Mora	Gracias Thanks	Winner
2011	author	Vaunda Micheaux Nelson	Bad News for Outlaws	Honor
2011	author	Laura Purdie Salas	Bookspeak! Poems About Books	Honor

== See also ==
- Caldecott Medal
- Newbery Medal
