= Le Petit Journal des Refusées =

Le Petit Journal des Refusées (French, “The Little Journal of Rejects”) was a San Francisco-based literary magazine published in 1896. Though the magazine intended to be a quarterly publication, it only produced one issue during its short existence.

Front cover of Le Petit Journal des Refusées, 1896.

== Background ==
Deliberately amateurish and playful in content and design, this independent magazine was created by the humorist Gelett Burgess under the pseudonym of James Marrion 2nd. Other known contributors included Burgess’ artist friends Ernest Peixotto, Porter Garnett, and Bruce Porter, all of whom were familiar with the popular print culture of their day, as well as the experimental trends being spearheaded by UK- and US-based little magazines.

Le Petit Journal des Refusées was published on July 1, 1896. It was part of a wave of over two hundred other short-lived little magazines that surfaced in the United States during the 1890s. Its publication was announced in issue six of The Lark (October 1895), another magazine founded by Burgess, in a call for submissions:

The Century is Coming to a Close! Hurry Up and Get Your Name in Print or You’ll be Left. There are 63,250,000 people in the United States. 50,000 have suffered amputation of both hands. For the remaining 63,200,000 writers, there are only 7000 periodicals.

Though critics today have remarked upon the magazine's innovative graphical language and potential proto-modernist influence, Burgess himself was dismissive of the magazine's accomplishments. In a 1904 letter to Houghton Library benefactor Thomas Newell Metcalf, Burgess wrote that he was “rather ashamed of the thing”, suggesting his work was part of “the riot of foolish magazinelets then prevalent”.

== Format ==
Le Petit Journal des Refusées was printed on trapezoidal-shaped pieces of old wallpaper, resulting in unique copies with page colours ranging from primarily black-and-white to gold and greens. Cutting of the pages is estimated to have occurred after printing and binding. When opened, the magazine resembled a butterfly.

Each copy consisted of 16 pages and featured a mixture of hand-drawn and typeset fonts. Its letterpress text was an offshoot of Clarendon, which was a commonly preferred font in the nineteenth century. Le Petit Journal des Refusées is illustration-heavy, and all of its images were hand-drawn. Each page features thick-set, decorative borders crowded with an array of aesthetic choices considered highly inventive for its time. Examples of the magazine's graphic innovation include a "cubist" sketch in the border of “The Naughty Archer”, a series of animals with textile-patterned bodies surrounding the poem “Abstrosophy”, and a chain of vibrating heads joined by their long, curling tongues on the back page of the poem “The Ghost of a Flea”.

According to the magazine's editorial page, single copies were priced at 16 cents each, whereas subscriptions, curiously, were priced at $16 a year.

== Content: jokes and jests ==
“Portrait du rédacteur en chef” from Le Petit Journal des Refusées, 1896.

As suggested by its title, Le Petit Journal des Refusées masquerades as a compilation of works by women authors that have been rejected by a minimum of three other publications. In reference to the women authors he claims to publish in his magazine, Burgess writes, in his editorial:

… Some of their productions that have been ruthlessly rejected by less large-hearted and appreciative editors than myself are permitted to witness the light of day for the first and last time…I take pleasure in opening to their crushed and despairing spirits this opportunity to get into print.

The magazine also conveys much of its humor through its graphic properties. For example, the page titled “Portrait du rédacteur en chef” (“Portrait of the Editor”) does not actually identify the editor in question. Instead, it depicts a youth in silhouette, a comic rendering which simultaneously conceals Burgess’ identity. This silhouette is bordered by alternating images of rejection letters and the thick tears presumably shed by female authors whose works were refused by other editors.

Critics have argued that even the magazine's trapezoidal shape allows it to literally stand apart from other books on a bookshelf.

== Influences ==
“The Ghost of a Flea” from Le Petit Journal des Refusées, 1896.

Le Petit Journal des Refusées parodies the high-art literary magazines of the Decadent Era by imitating and exaggerating their graphic style through the hand-drawn techniques of popular print culture. In addition to European literary and artistic works, Burgess was also influenced by a range of publications from the United States – and in particular, the San Francisco Bay Area. The Bay Area publications that influenced Le Petit Journal des Refusées include “college year-books, popular lifestyle magazines, business…catalogues, news journals and…literary art publications”.

Some of the references in Le Petit Journal des Refusées are clearly explicit. The poem titled “The Ghost of a Flea”, for example, is a direct reference to the miniature painting by William Blake. The border for “The Ghost of a Flea” features the iconic cats from Le Chat Noir, the Parisian cabaret and its namesake journal. Meanwhile, the border of “Our Clubbing List” is filled with intertwining “Goops”, the bald-headed characters Burgess created and popularized in The Lark.

Back cover of Le Petit Journal des Refusées, 1896.

Burgess also explicitly names his influencers in "Our Clubbing List", an alphabet of the magazine's "admired and disdained contemporaries". He credits illustrator Aubrey Beardsley amongst his admired contemporaries as "the idol supreme, / Whose drawings are not half so bad / as they seem". Beardsley's influence is visible in the bold black-and-white graphics of the magazine's cover. The woman on the far right of the cover is reminiscent of the women of Beardsley's The Yellow Book, while the Japanese actor on her left resembles the figures in the Japanese prints popular in the nineteenth century. The Native American figure next to the Japanese actor belongs to the world of the “Old West” prints produced by Karl Bodmer and his contemporaries. On the left of the Native American figure is a skeleton, a regular figure in the “sophomoric humor world”, which also re-appears on the magazine's back cover in a humorous take on the female-centric, period bicycle posters created by Georges Massias and Will H. Bradley.

== Cultural impact ==
Le Petit Journal des Refusées drew readers from subscribers of The Wave, The Lark and The Wasp, the San Francisco publications for which Burgess also wrote. The magazine's impact, however, should not be assessed solely by its short publication life. Critics have argued for the magazine's awareness and skillful manipulation of nineteenth century print cultural values, as well as its contributions as an early predictor of modernist trends.

=== Literary criticism ===
Johanna Drucker has argued that Le Petit Journal des Refusées exemplifies both the middle-brow and the modern. While the magazine's cubist borders and self-conscious engagement with mass print culture reflect modernist innovation, the magazine is not fully modern because it does not care to “resist…the culture of which it is a part.”

Drucker argues, however, that Le Petit Journal des Refusées does achieve its middle-brow quality by referencing publications typically consumed by a middle-brow audience – such as The Salvation Army’s The War Cry, The Chap-Book and the American Journal of Insanity (now the American Journal of Psychiatry). Drucker argues that Le Petit Journal des Refusées’ unabashed association with these works allows it to remain comfortably “situated in that bourgeois milieu, branded with being insufficiently critical, complacently consumable, happily aiming for a broader audience.”

Other critics attribute a more significant outcome to the magazine's agenda. Brad Evans acknowledges Le Petit Journal des Refusées’ “carefree spirit”, but suggests that it may be less middle-brow than Drucker purports. The magazine's numerous references to other literary and artistic works, both textually and through its re-representations of images, reveal a critical awareness that makes the magazine seem closer to “the first aesthetic salvo of the modernist movement”. Le Petit Journal des Refusées’ “proto-Cubist and proto-Dadaist visuals” provided a lead-in for other little magazines to carry the trend further, even though Burgess may have been unaware of this effect at the time. Evans further argues that Le Petit Journal des Refusées introduced a new aesthetic by elevating the concept of parody to a formal convention. After all, the magazine's status as a “refused” publication set it aside from other periodicals of the time, signaling its potential to help re-shape the existing “aesthetic public sphere”.
