= Vaunda Micheaux Nelson =

American writer

Vaunda Micheaux Nelson is an American writer known for her fiction and nonfiction books for children and young adults. She was the winner of the 2010 Coretta Scott King Award and Gelett Burgess Children's Book Honor for her non-fiction book Bad News for Outlaws: The Remarkable Life of Bass Reeves, Deputy U.S. Marshal about the life of Bass Reeves. Nelson is also the author of The Book Itch: Freedom, Truth & Harlem's Greatest Bookstore. Her book Who Will I Be, Lord? received a Charlotte Zolotow Award Commendation in 2010.

She is a youth services librarian at the public library in Rio Rancho, New Mexico, where she lives with her husband. She is the grand-niece of brothers Solomon Lightfoot Michaux, better known as Elder Michaux, minister and advisor to presidents, and Lewis H. Michaux, the pioneer Harlem bookseller.
