= Bad News for Outlaws =

2009 children's book by Vaunda Micheaux Nelson

- Author: Vaunda Micheaux Nelson
- Illustrator: R. Gregory Christie
- Language: English
- Genre: Children's literature
- Publisher: Lerner Publishing Group
- Publication date: 2009
- Publication place: United States
- Awards: 2010 Coretta Scott King Author Award
- ISBN: 9780822567646

Bad News for Outlaws is a 2009 children's book written by Vaunda Micheaux Nelson and illustrated by R. Gregory Christie, originally published by Lerner Publishing Group. It chronicles the life of Bass Reeves, a 19th-century black deputy marshal for the United States government who worked in the Arkansas and Oklahoma Territories.

== Synopsis ==
Bad News for Outlaws chronicles the life of Bass Reeves, a black deputy marshal for the United States government who worked in the Arkansas and Oklahoma Territories for 32 years. Each page tells a different story about him, ranging from his youth in slavery to clever ways he brought wanted outlaws into custody, through the day he stopped working as a peace officer (when the territory reached statehood). The story ends with his death from Bright's disease.

== Background ==
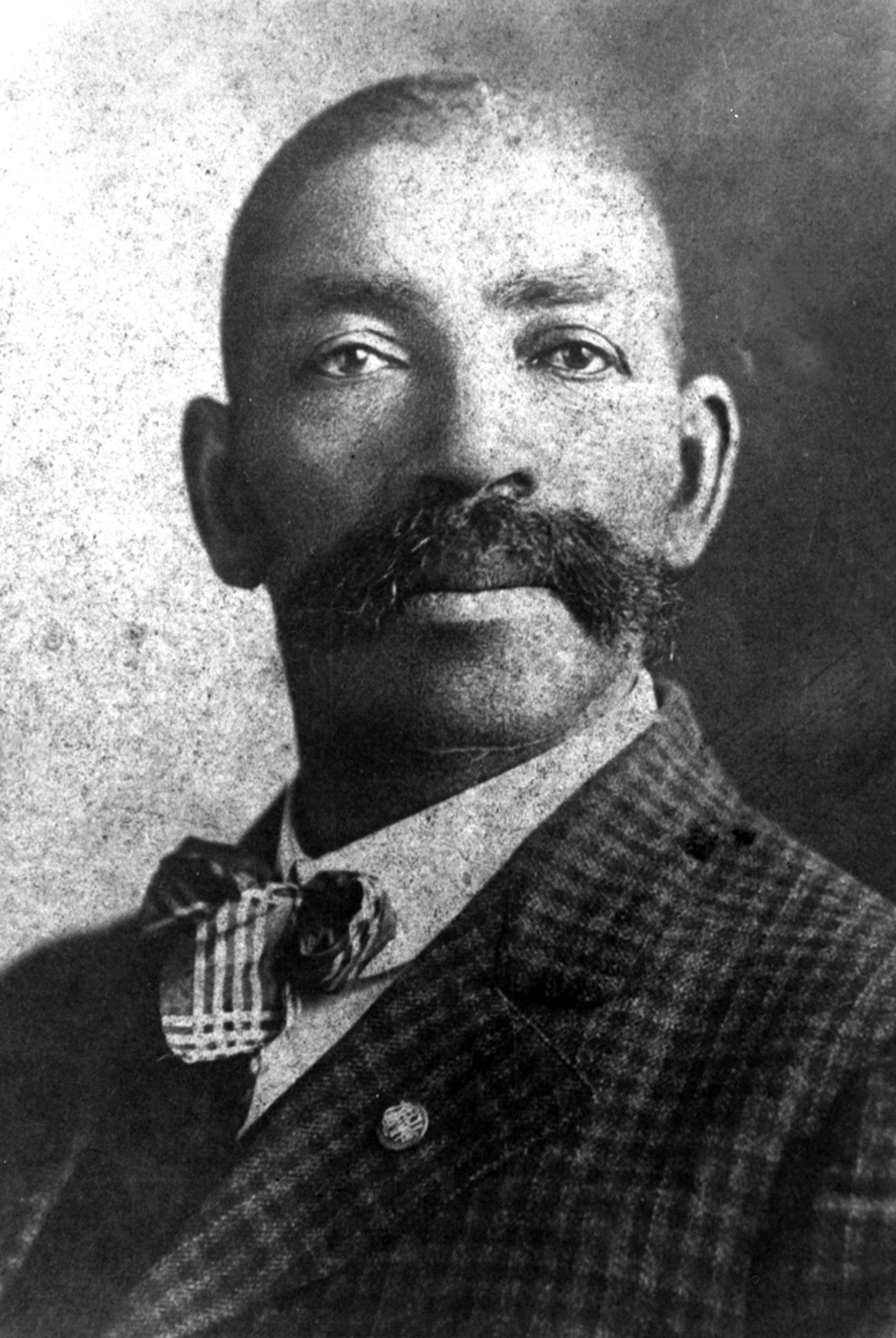
Bass Reeves

Nelson first heard about Bass Reeves through a documentary on blacks in the West that her husband Drew had found. The documentary made a small reference to Reeves, and Nelson researched his story. She consulted with Art T. Burton, a historian who has published on Reeves. Nelson reviewed drafts of illustrations for historical accuracy. In one case, the draft of the illustration of Reeves pulling a steer out of the mud showed him fully clothed, pulling the steer with a rope. Nelson gave the additional information that he went into the mud with the steer without his clothes, a fact which the final illustration reflects.

== Reception ==
Bad News for Outlaws was one of Lerner's best-selling books. Kirkus Reviews called it "a narrative that hits the bull's-eye". Publishers Weekly's starred review congratulates Nelson for "chronicl[ing] the life of African-American lawman Bass Reeves in a biography that elevates him to folk hero". Junior Library Guild praised the "dramatic" artwork and treatment of gun violence.

At Booklist, Ian Chipman described how the book described Reeves's life "with narrative panache and visual swagger". Abby McGanney Nolan at The Washington Post wrote that the book "seamlessly blends moral uplift (he used his gun only when he was forced to), entertaining anecdotes (he used disguises to catch fleeing criminals), an appealing design (the paper looks like weathered 19th-century parchment) and spare but spirited language".

== Honors and awards ==
The book appeared on the National Endowment for the Humanities Nonfiction Booklist for Young Readers in 2014, and was an ALA Notable Children's Book in 2010. It won the 2010 Coretta Scott King Author Award, the New Mexico-Arizona Book Award, and the Once Upon a World Children's Book Award, both in 2010.
