= The Mysterious Miss Terry =

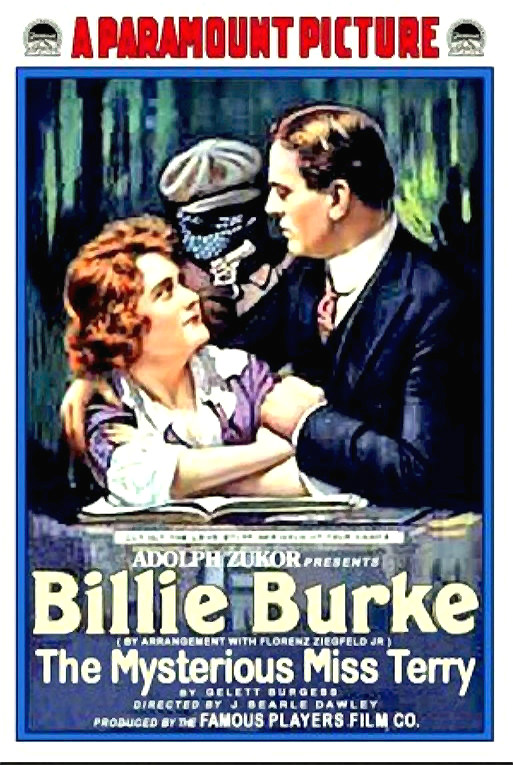
- Film poster
- Directed by: J. Searle Dawley
- Written by: Gelett Burgess
- Produced by: Adolph Zukor
- Starring: Billie Burke
- Cinematography: H. Lyman Broening
- Distributed by: Paramount Pictures
- Release date: September 1917
- Running time: 5 reels
- Country: United States
- Language: Silent (English intertitles)

The Mysterious Miss Terry is a 1917 American silent drama film produced by Famous Players–Lasky and distributed through Paramount Pictures. The film stars Billie Burke, who at the time was a famous stage actress, married to Florenz Ziegfeld Jr. This particular story was adapted special to the screen for Burke by writer Gelett Burgess. It is a lost film.

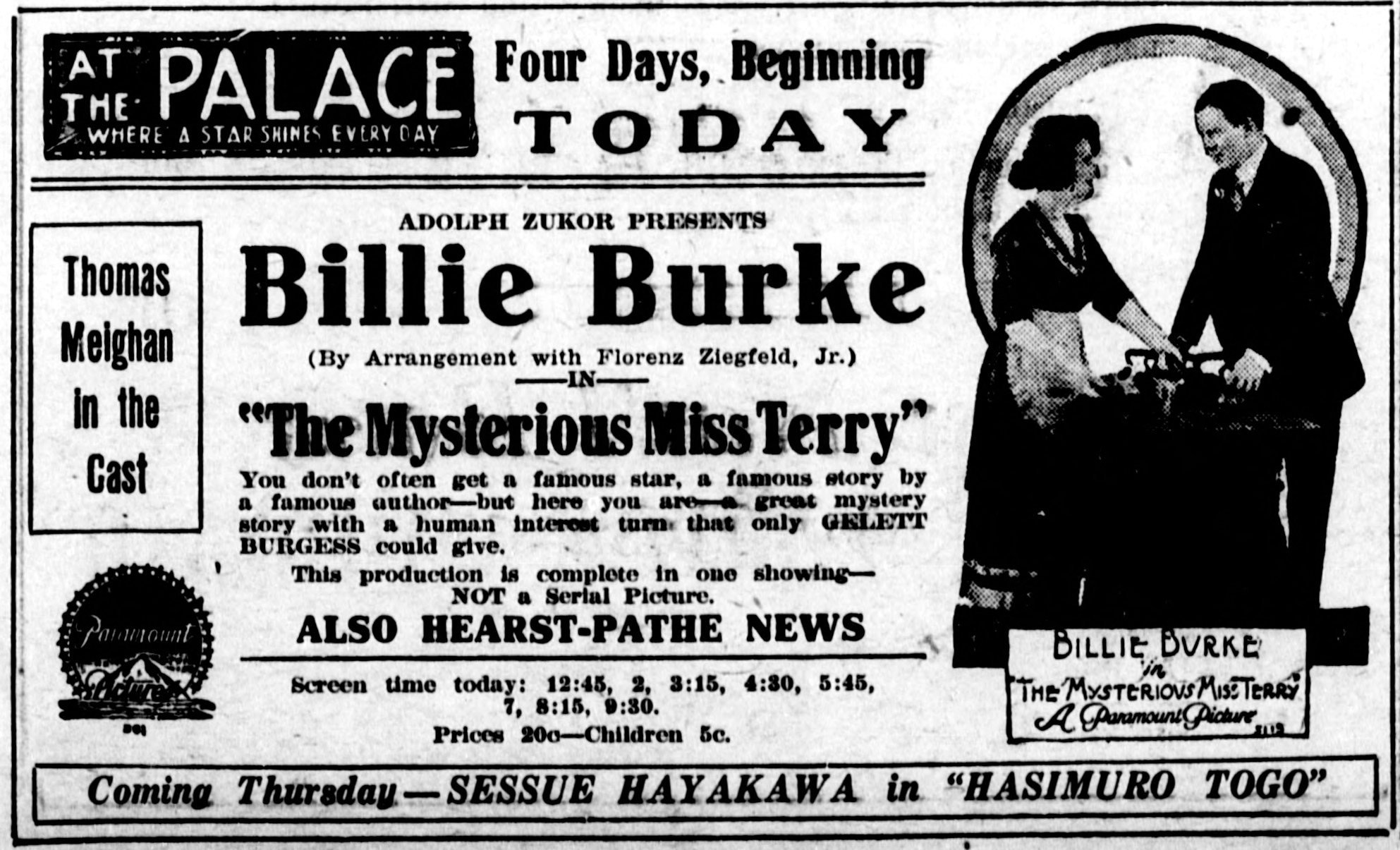
Newspaper Advertisement.

== Plot ==
As described in a film magazine, a fascinating young heiress takes rooms at a cheap boarding house and assumes the name Miss Terry. The male boarders immediately fall in love with her and, when she secures a temporary position in a hardware store as a bookkeeper, they all help her keep the books. As a test of the bravery of one of the young men, she arranges for two others to dress as burglars and break into the store at night when she and Gordon True are there. Professional burglars, however, overhear the plan and break into the store first, where they steal the money and shoot Gordon. Miss Terry nurses the boy back to health, arranges to have his book published, and assists the other male boarders to better themselves. Miss Terry discloses her identity, and the film ends with wedding bells for her and Gordon.

== Cast ==
- Billie Burke - Mavis Terry
- Thomas Meighan - Gordon True
- Gerald Oliver Smith - John Quig
- Walter Hiers - Freddie Bollen
- George A. Wright - Mr. Pennyquick
- Bessie Hearn - Clara Pennyquick

== Reception ==
Like many American films of the time, The Mysterious Miss Terry was subject to cuts by city and state film censorship boards. The Chicago Board of Censors ordered the cutting of a scene of a policeman looking up at a statue, seven holdup scenes, a shooting scene, and a scene of a man looking up at a statue.
