= Louis Fancher =

Louis D. Fancher
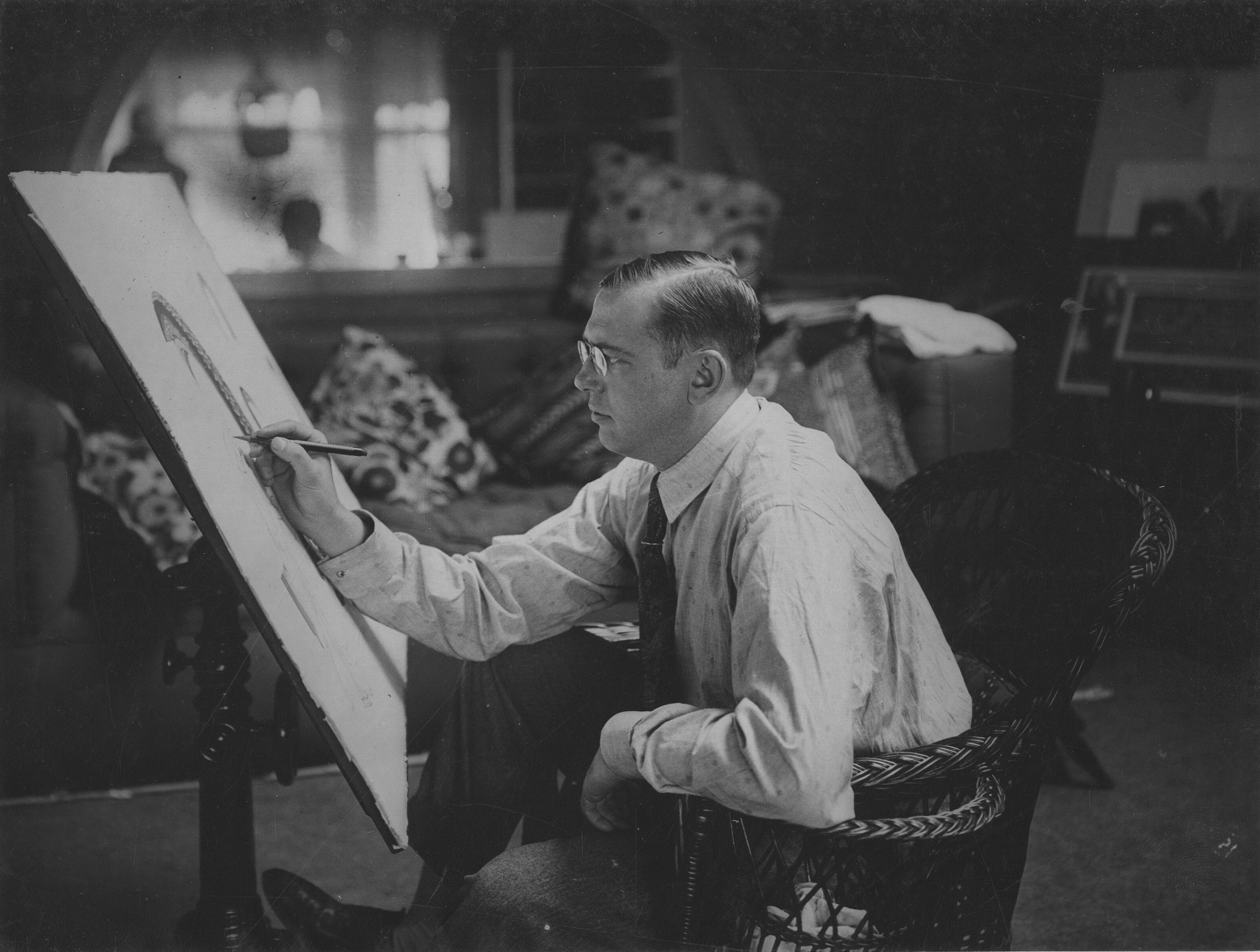
- Fancher at work, 1918
- Born: December 25, 1884; Minneapolis, Minnesota, US
- Died: March 2, 1944 (aged 59); New York City
- Known for: Illustrator, painter

Louis Delton Fancher (December 25, 1884 – March 2, 1944) was an American artist and illustrator, notable for his drawings that appeared in books, in magazines, and on propaganda posters during World War I.

Fancher was born in Minneapolis, Minnesota. He was a student of Harry Siddons Mowbray, Robert Henri, and Kenyon Cox. He was active in San Francisco as well as in New York, where he lived most of his life.

He also served in military intelligence with the US Army. He is buried at Arlington National Cemetery.

== Notable works ==
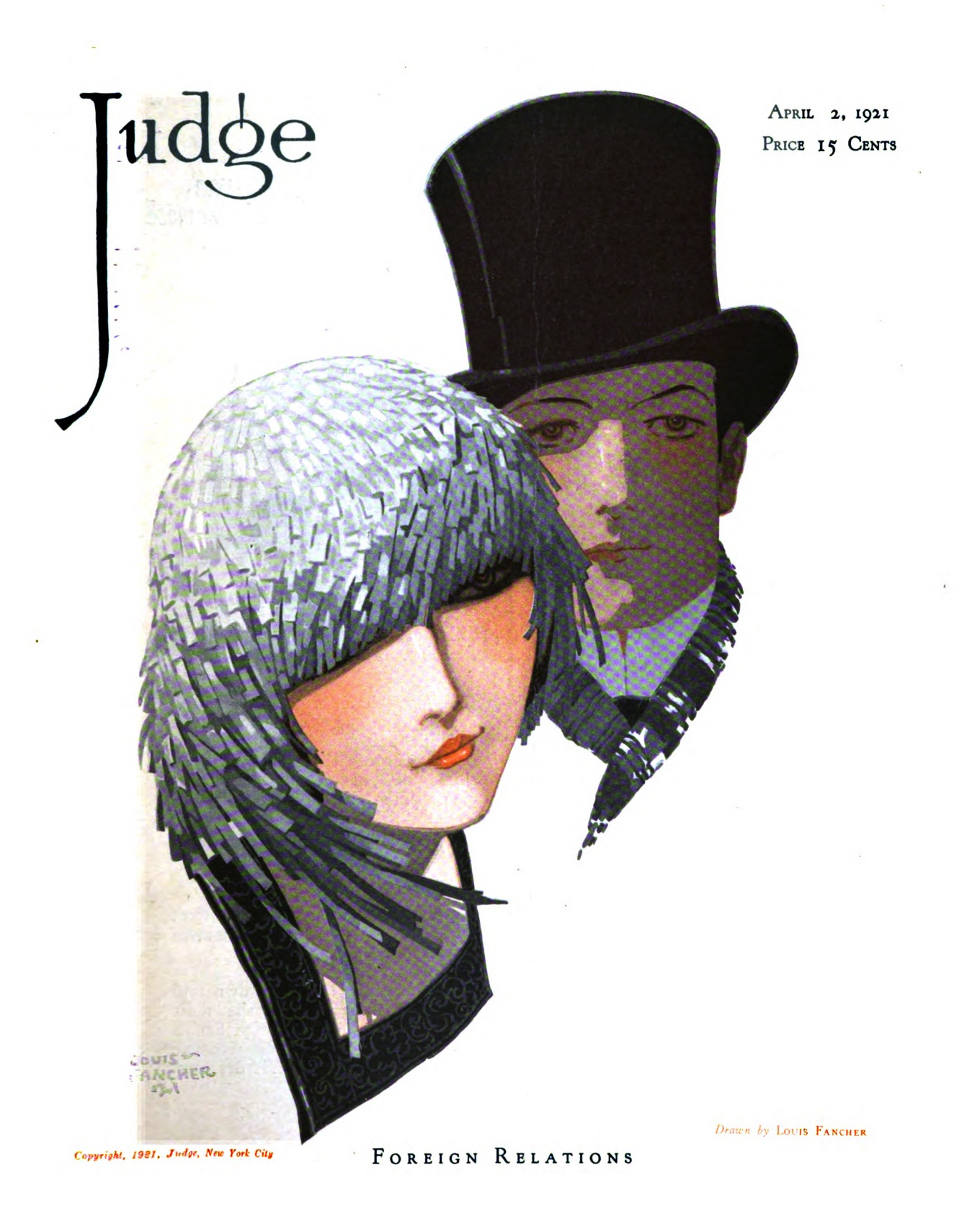
Judge cover by Fancher, 2 Apr 1921

Fancher illustrated two books of humorous maxims by Gelett Burgess, The Maxims of Methuselah and The Maxims of Noah. He also created well-known propaganda and recruitment posters for the aviation section of the United States Army Signal Corps and the Committee on Public Information. Two of his oil paintings were Price 10 Cents, which had a winter sleigh theme, and Moving Lumber, which followed an exotic theme with an elephant carrying a tree trunk through a jungle. He also created postcards for automobile companies, including Pierce-Arrow Motor Car Company, and Packard. His illustrations for the latter featured the Packard "38" Runabout in Holland, the "38" Phaeton in Paris and the "48" touring car at the Grand Canyon.

In 1933, Fancher painted and produced a large map depicting the history of food production in Iowa, including details of specific crops and foodstuffs, for an exhibit operated by The Great Atlantic & Pacific Tea Company at the Century of Progress. The following year, he produced a series of posters depicting the details of retail food distribution during the growth of the United States; these were displayed in Great Atlantic & Pacific Tea Company grocery stores as a special exhibit for their 75th anniversary.

Illustrations by Louis Fancher for car advertisements
Pierce Arrow advertisement (1909)

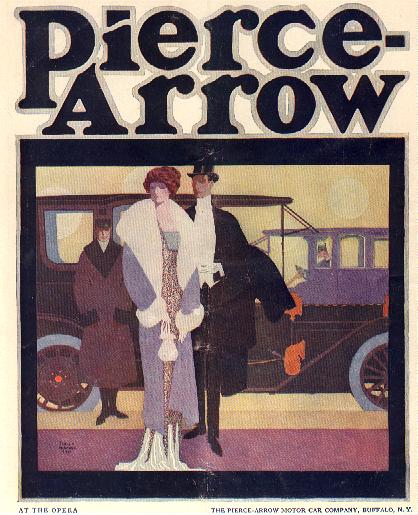
Pierce Arrow advertisement (1911)

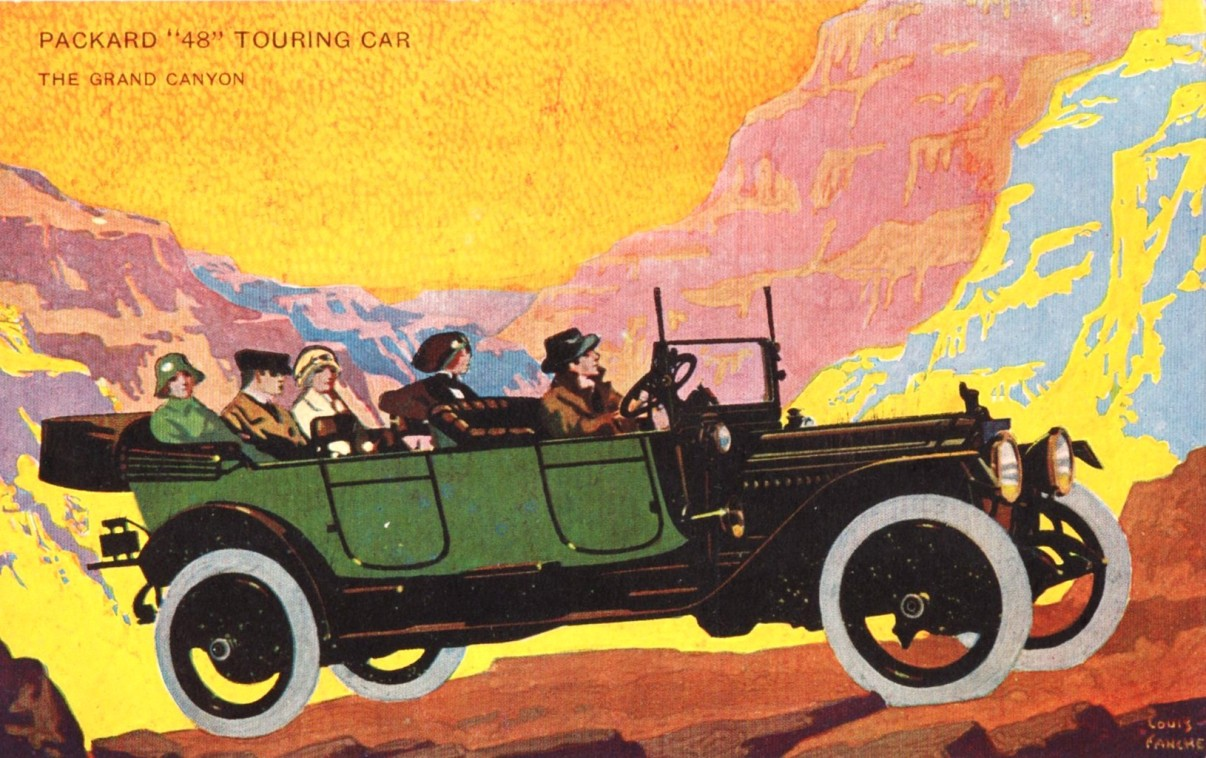
Packard 48 Touring Car at the Grand Canyon (1914)

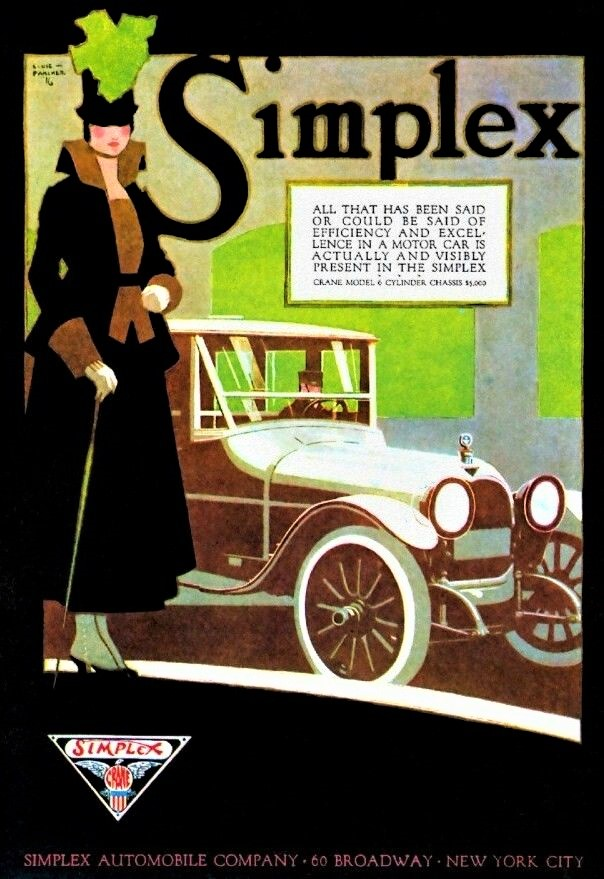
Simplex Crane Model (1915)
Illustrations by Louis Fancher for The Maxims of Methuselah by Gelett Burgess (1907)
Frontispiece

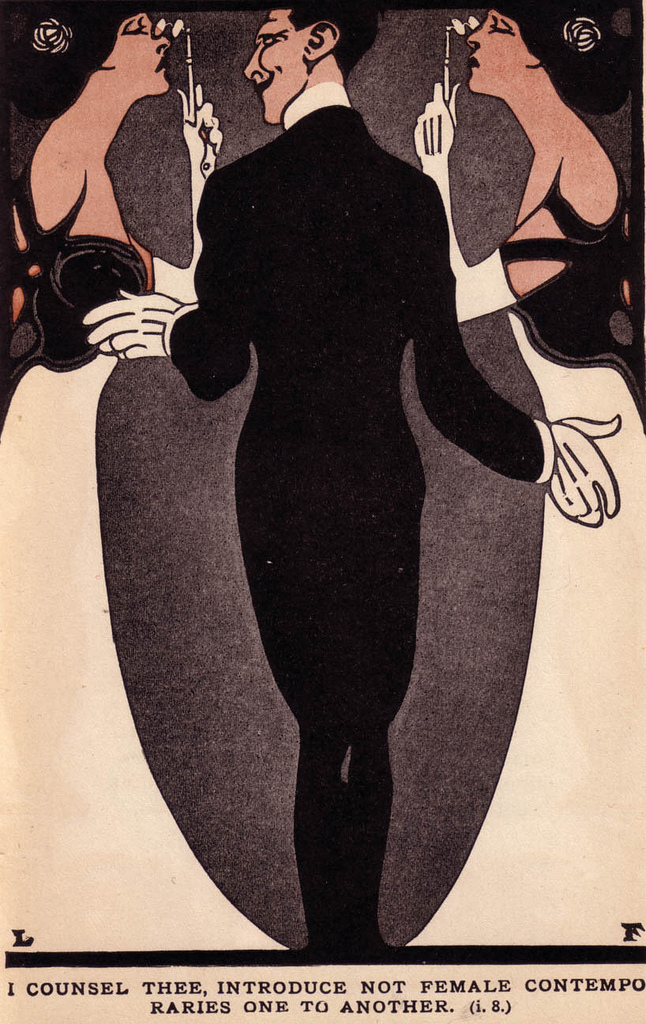
"I counsel thee, introduce not female contemporaries one to another."

"The sun must not see what the moon seeth."

"The Damsel yearneth for chivalry, but the matron desireth impertinence."
