= Stanley Littlejohn =

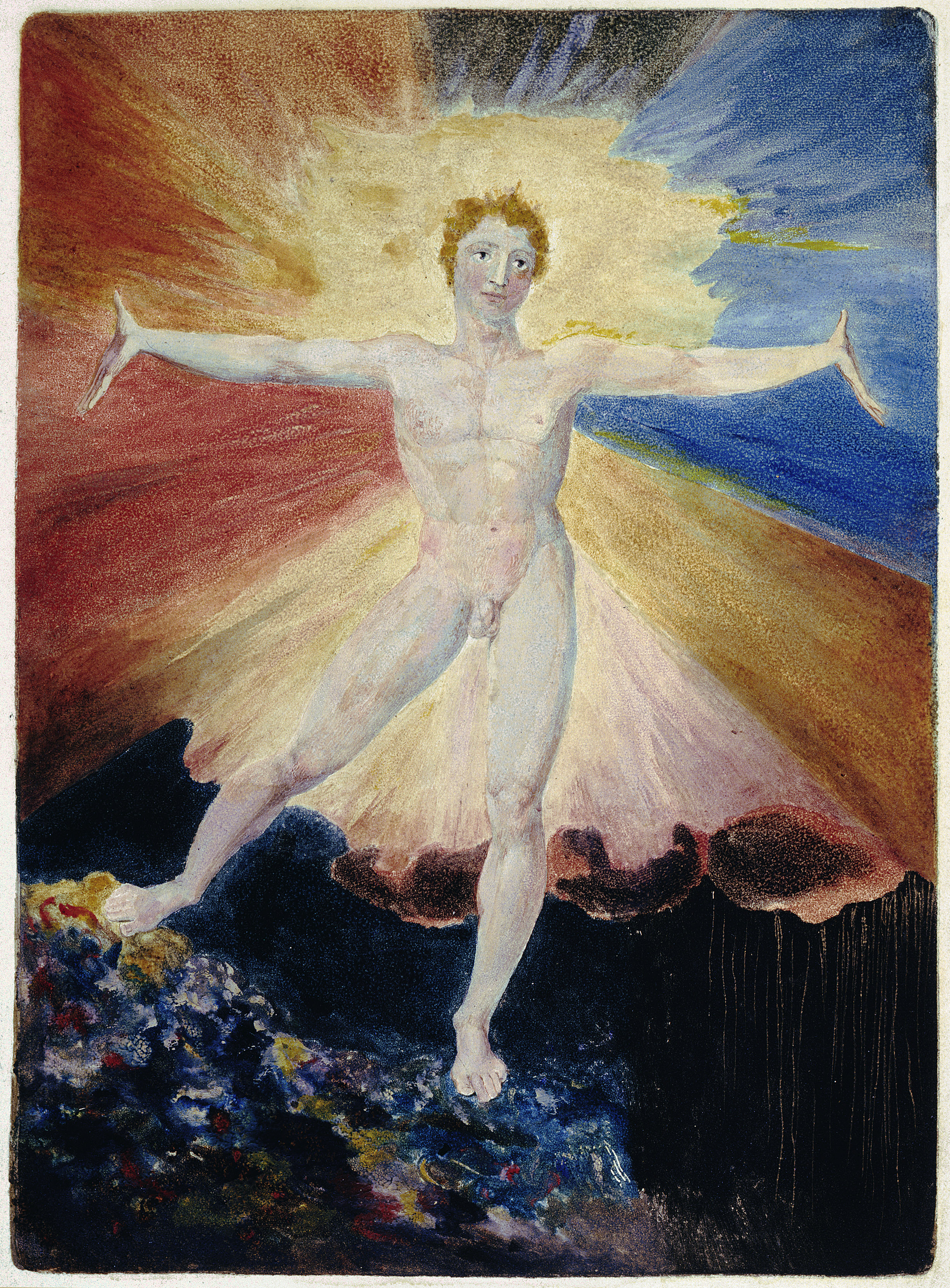
Littlejohn's work on William Blake's Glad Day is one of the restorer's most regarded achievements.

Stanley Littlejohn (1876–1917) was an English painting conservator and restorer. He is best known for his work on Tintoretto's sketches, and for his restoration of a number of paintings and drawings by William Blake, including Glad Day and The Ghost of a Flea.

Born in Camberwell, London, Littlejohn began his career as an engraver. In 1904, he was appointed to the staff of the British Museum repairing and restoring workshop, and became its head in 1908. He had a deep interest in Oriental painting and employed many of the techniques of master Japanese methods of mounting, and advised on work on the Aurel Stein Collection. He was employed by the National Portrait Gallery on two occasions, when he worked on pieces by John Constable, George Richmond and Alfred Stevens. He served with the Royal Engineers during the First World War. On his eighth day of active combat, he was killed when he was struck on the head by shrapnel from a shell which had exploded close to him.

On his death, he was described as a "uniquely gifted craftsman and valuable public servant", who in his field "had no rival anywhere". In 1918, The Burlington Magazine wrote that "each artist of this rank leaves an actual void which can never be filled by anyone else".

== Bibliography ==
- Binyon, Laurence and Colvin, Sidney. "The Late Stanley William Littlejohn". The Burlington Magazine for Connoisseurs, Volume 32, No. 178, January 1918.
- Veitch, H. N. "The 'Jerusalem Dish' at Sotheby's". The Burlington Magazine for Connoisseurs, Volume 33, No. 184, July 1918.
