= The Ghost of a Flea =

Painting by William Blake

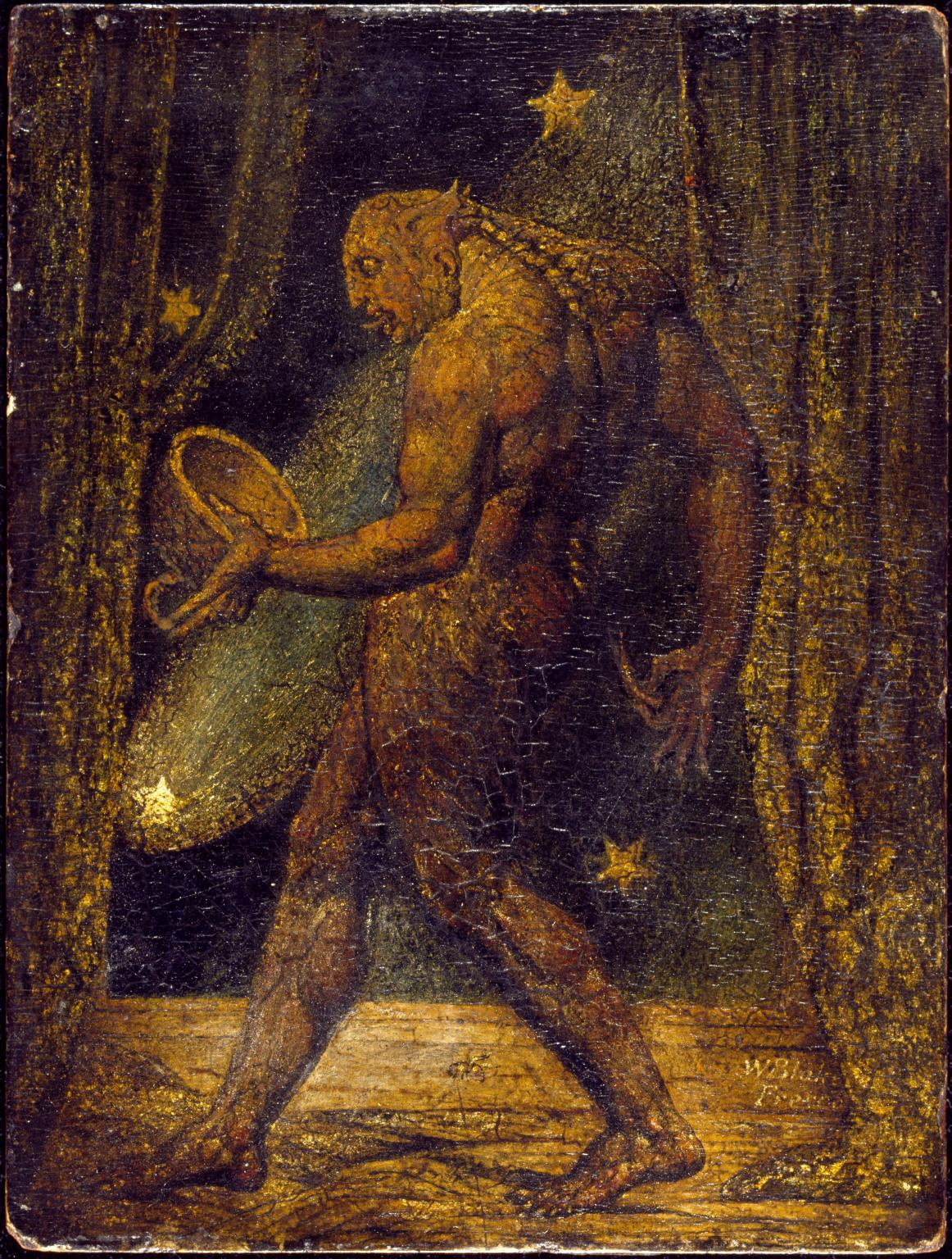
The Ghost of a Flea, c. 1819–20. Tate. Tempera mixture panel with gold on mahogany, 21.4 cm × 16.2 cm (painting), 38.2 mm × 32.4 mm × 5.0 mm (frame)

The Ghost of a Flea is a miniature painting by the English poet, painter and printmaker William Blake, held in the Tate Gallery, London. Measuring only 8.42 by 6.3 inches (21.4 by 16.0 centimetres), it is executed in a tempera mixture with gold, on a mahogany-type tropical hardwood panel. It was completed between 1819 and 1820, as part of a series depicting "Visionary Heads" commissioned by the watercolourist and astrologist John Varley (1778–1842). Fantastic, spiritual art was popular in Britain from around 1770 to 1830, and during this time Blake often worked on unearthly, supernatural panels to amuse and amaze his friends.

At 21.4 cm × 16.2 cm the work is a greatly reduced miniature portrait. Blake generally worked on a small scale; most of his illuminated pages, engravings and many of his paintings are only inches high. Although Ghost of a Flea is one of Blake's smallest works, it is monumental in its imagination. Its tiny scale achieves drama in contrasting the muscular bulk and apparent power of the creature against its incarnation in the panel as an insect.

== Background ==
Blake first met John Varley in the autumn of 1818. Varley was 21 years younger than the artist, and has been described as a "genial 17-stone bear of a man." A student of astrology and zodiacal physiognomy, Varley held a strong belief in the existence of spirits, but was frustrated by his inability to see them. Thus he was drawn to Blake, who claimed to have seen visions daily since when, as a small child, he had seen a tree "filled with angels, bright angelic wings bespangling every bough like stars." The two would often gather late at night in Varley's house, and played a game in which Varley would attempt to summon the spirit of a historical or mythological person. On the appearance of the spirit, Blake would then attempt to sketch their likeness.

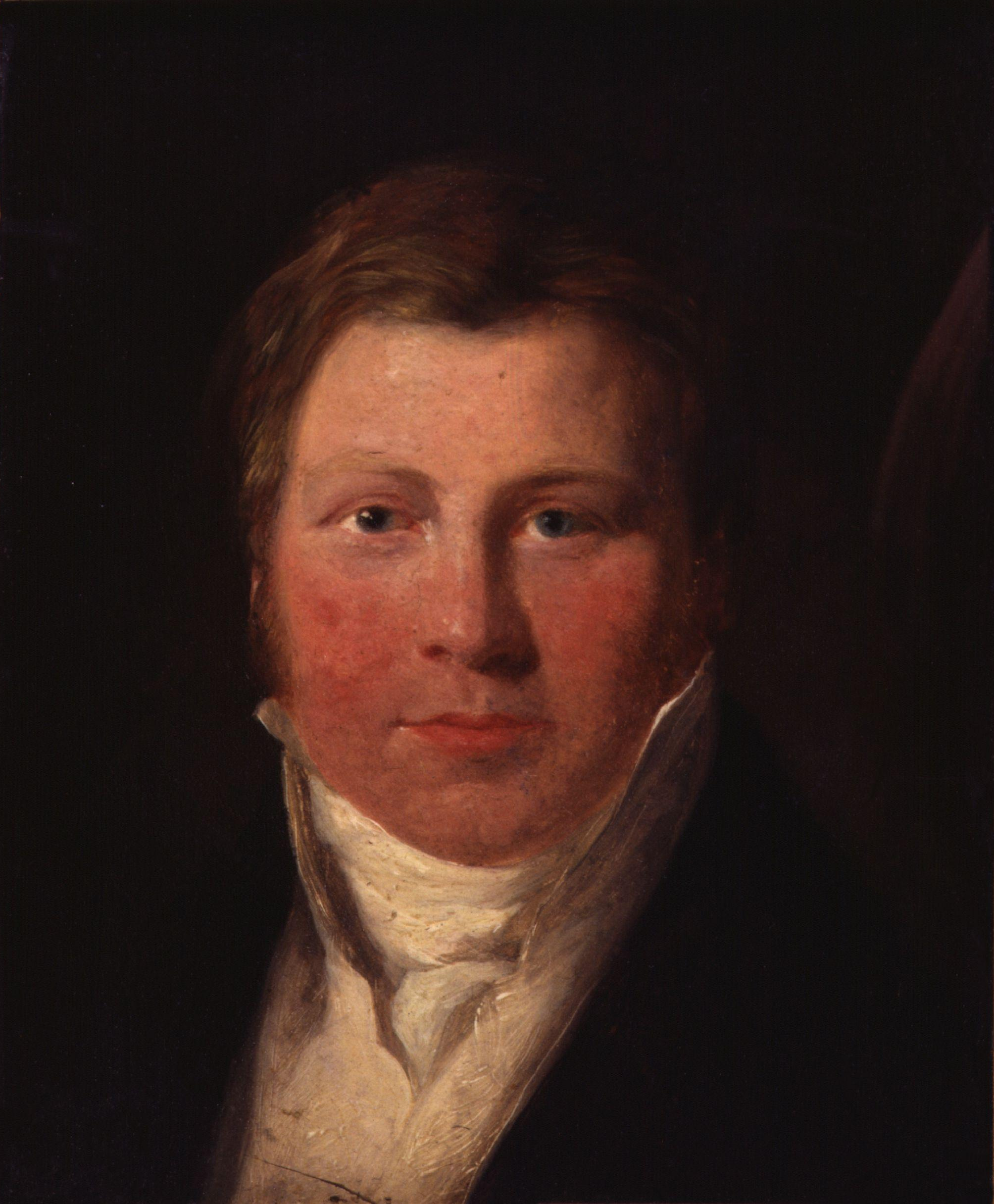
John Varley portrayed by William Mulready, 1814. National Portrait Gallery, London

According to Varley, the imagery of a Flea came to Blake during an 1819 séance. Varley described the scene:

"As I was anxious to make the most correct investigation in my power, of the truth of these visions, on hearing of this spiritual apparition of a Flea, I asked him if he could draw for me the resemblance of what he saw: he instantly said, 'I see him now before me.' I therefore gave him paper and a pencil with which he drew the portrait... I felt convinced by his mode of proceeding, that he had a real image before him, for he left off, and began on another part of the paper, to make a separate drawing of the mouth of the Flea, which the spirit having opened, he was prevented from proceeding with the first sketch, till he had closed it."

Blake's Victorian biographer Alexander Gilchrist (1828–1861) wrote that, three decades earlier in 1790, "Blake, for the only time in his life, saw a ghost... Standing one evening at his garden-door in Lambeth, and chancing to look up, he saw a horrible grim figure, 'scaly, speckled, very awful,' stalking downstairs towards him. More frightened than ever before or after, he took to his heels, and ran out of the house."

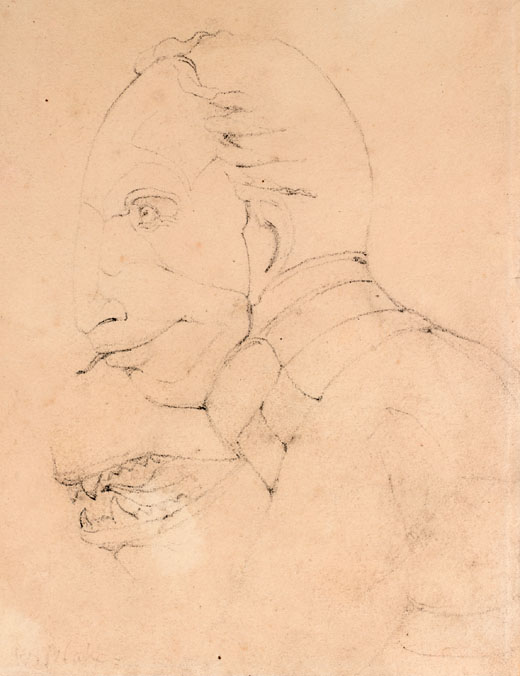
Blake's The Head of the Ghost of a Flea, (Verso: A Profile and a Reduced Drawing of Milton's First Wife circa 1819). Pencil on paper, 189 mm × 153 mm, c. 1819. Tate, London

Although not directly stated by Gilchrist, there is a close connection between the ghost and the later The Head of the Ghost of a Flea.

Blake often said that he was joined by invisible sitters as he drew them, including, he claimed, a number of angels, Voltaire, Moses and the Flea, who told him that "fleas were inhabited by the souls of such men as were by nature blood thirsty to excess." One of Blake's obituaries stated that "the flea communicated to Mr. Blake what passed, as related to himself, at the Creation. 'It was first intended,' said he (the flea) 'to make me as big as a bullock; but then when it was considered from my construction, so armed—and so powerful withal, that in proportion to my bulk, (mischievous as I now am) that I should have been a too mighty destroyer; it was determined to make me—no bigger than I am."

In both his artwork and poetry, Blake often gave personality and human form to such abstractions as time, death, plague and famine. Fleas are often associated with uncleanliness and degradation; in this work, the artist sought to magnify a flea into "a monstrous creature whose bloodthirsty instinct was imprinted on every detail of its appearance, with 'burning eyes which long for moisture', and a 'face worthy of a murderer'."

== Description ==
The muscular and nude Flea is depicted using its jutting tongue to gorge on a bowl of blood. Part human, part vampire and part reptile, the beast strides from right to left between heavy and richly patterned curtains. In his left hand he holds an acorn and in his right a thorn, both items drawn from the tradition of fairy iconography. His massive neck is similar to that of a bull and holds a disproportionally small head, marked by glaring eyes and open jaws, and a venomous slithering tongue. According to the art critic Jonathan Jones, the flea is depicted as an "evil, gothic, grotesque stalking through a starry realm between stage curtains."

Ghost of a Flea is distinguished by its innovative use of gold leaf. Beneath the curtain folds, the flesh of the flea and bright stars, Blake placed a thin foil of "white" gold which he made from gold-silver alloy. He then used a brush and powdered gold foil made into paint to colour much of the minute detail. Blake overlaid it using thick brown paint derived from sugar, gum and glue.

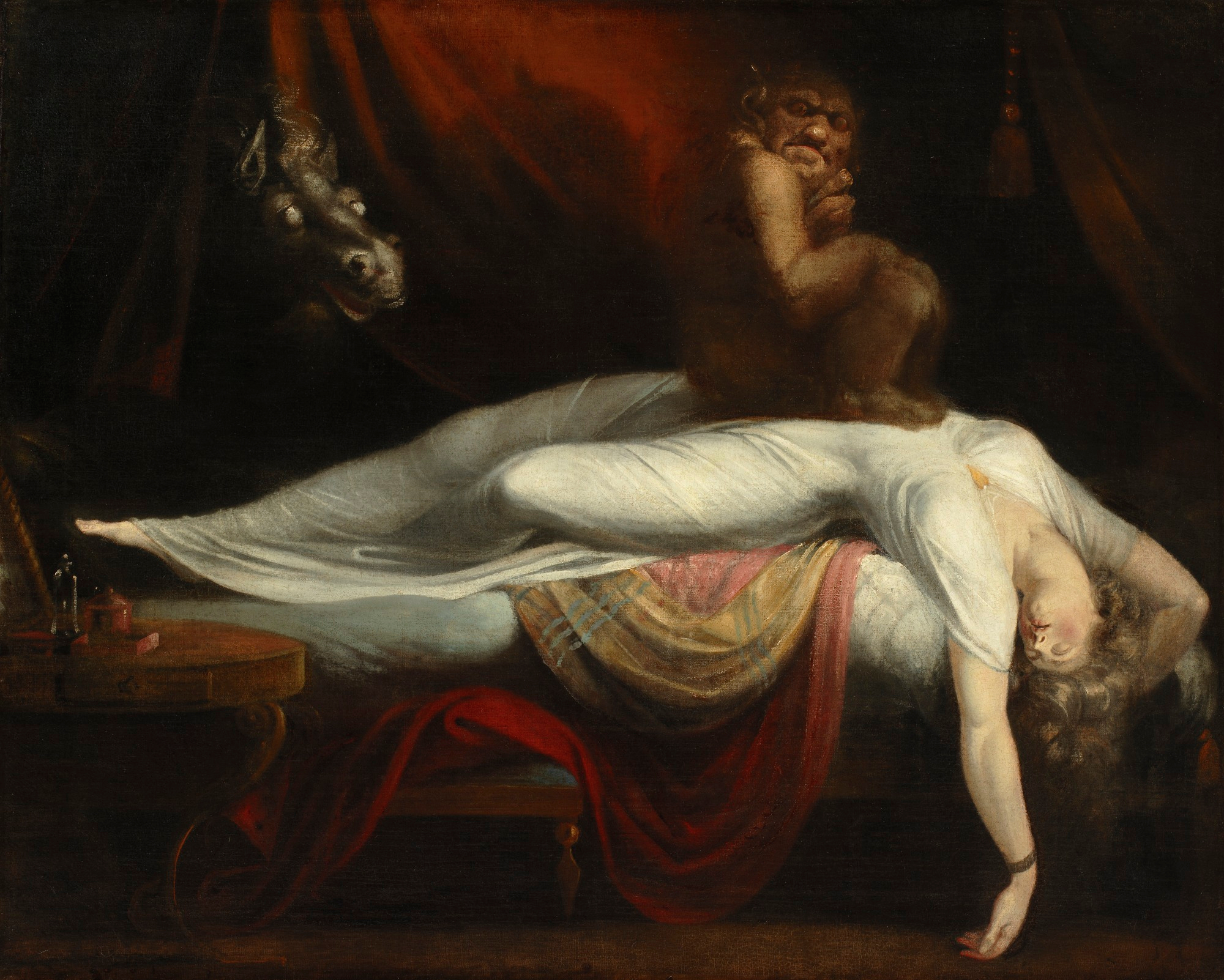
Henry Fuseli, The Nightmare. Oil on canvas, c. 1781. Detroit Institute of Arts

The painting was created using Blake's distinctive tempera technique, which he describes in the lower right of the panel, beneath the shell gold signature, as "fresco". On the reverse of the panel is written, "The Vision of the Spirit that inhabits the body of a Flea, and which appeared to the late Mr. Blake, the Designer of the vignettes for Blair Grave and the Book of Job. The Visions first appeared to him in my presence and afterwards, till he had finished this picture. The Flea drew blood on this." Today the work is in relatively poor condition, partly due to the technique employed by Blake. Areas of the surface have cracked and dulled with age.

Although Blake was singular in his ability to directly transcribe visions onto canvas or paper, a number of visual and literary sources can be detected in this work. The art historian Hope Werness suggested that The Flea may be inspired by a 1665 work by early microscopist Robert Hooke (1635–1703), whose Micrographia includes a drawing of a flea microscopically observed.

Comparisons have been made to Henry Fuseli's monstrous imps, while the image of the flea echos figures in Blake's earlier work, and his scaly body is similar to the monster in his 1805 pen and ink drawing Pestilence: Death of the First Born. In 2006, the Tate hung The Ghost of a Flea and William Raddon's 1827 engraving after Fuseli's The Nightmare side by side in "The Nightmare in Modern Culture" room of their "Gothic Nightmares: Fuseli, Blake and the Romantic Imagination" exhibition.

== Reception ==
During his lifetime, Blake's prints were described as the work of a madman. This view was reinforced when word spread that Blake was inspired through visions, and, according to G. E. Bentley, "So plain was Blake's madness to some that they assumed he must have been confined in a madhouse" and few were willing to believe that the artist actually saw anything.

In 2006, the painting was described by The New York Times as Blake's "quite strangest and certainly most Gothic work".

== Provenance ==
The Ghost of a Flea was purchased by Varley around 1820, and later passed to his son Albert Varley. A label on the reverse of the canvas states that the panel was sold by Albert in February 1878, a fact confirmed by an inscription written by the poet and artist William Bell Scott (1811–1890) on the inside back cover of the Blake-Varley Sketchbook which reads, "I have since getting this book [in 1870], bought the painting of the "Ghost" of the Flea, from Mr Varley of Oakley St. Chelsea, son of John Varley". On 14 July 1892, it was sold at Sotheby's to W. Graham Robertson for £10.50.

It was first exhibited at Carfax, Oxford, in 1906. In preparation for this showing, the panel was partially cleaned of dust. It was further treated when the exhibition ended by Stanley Littlejohn (1877–1917), who, in the words of the Blake collector W. Graham Robertson, lifted "the veil of darkness...from it without any impairing of the surface, and the picture now appears exactly as described by Allan Cunningham. The colours, though deep, are clear and brilliant; the gold, used to heighten the lights, shines with its old power, and on the floor, between the feet of the striding." It was first displayed at the Tate on loan in 1913, and donated to the gallery by Robertson in 1948. The sketch, along with several other of Blake's drawings and watercolours, had been donated to the gallery in 1940 by Alice G. E. Carthew.

== Sources ==
- Bentley, G.E. The Stranger From Paradise. New Haven: Yale University Press, 2003. ISBN 0-300-10030-2
- Bentley, G.E. Blake Records Oxford: Clarendon, 1969
- Butlin, Martin. William Blake 1757–1827. London: Tate Gallery Collections, V, 1990. ASIN B00188DELU
- Kuijsten, Marcel. Reflections on the Dawn of Consciousness: Julian Jaynes's Bicameral Mind Theory Revisited. Julian Jaynes Society, 2007. ISBN 0-9790744-0-1
- Myrone, Martin. The Blake Book. London: Tate Gallery, 2007. ISBN 978-1-85437-727-2
- Raine, Kathleen. William Blake. London: Thames and Hudson, 1970. ISBN 0-500-20107-2
- Robertson, Graham. The Blake Collection of W. Graham Robertson. London: Faber and Faber Limited, 1952
- Spencer, Terence. The Iconography of Crabtree. The Crabtree Orations 1954–1994. London: Crabtree Foundation, 1997
- Townsend, Joyce (ed.). William Blake: The Painter at Work. London: Tate Publishing, 2003. ISBN 1-85437-468-0
- Werness, Hope D. The Continuum Encyclopaedia of Animal Symbolism in World Art. Continuum International Publishing Group, 2004. ISBN 0-8264-1525-3
- "William Blake" (obituary). Literary Chronicle, 1 September 1827
