= Purple Cow =

1895 poem by Gelett Burgess

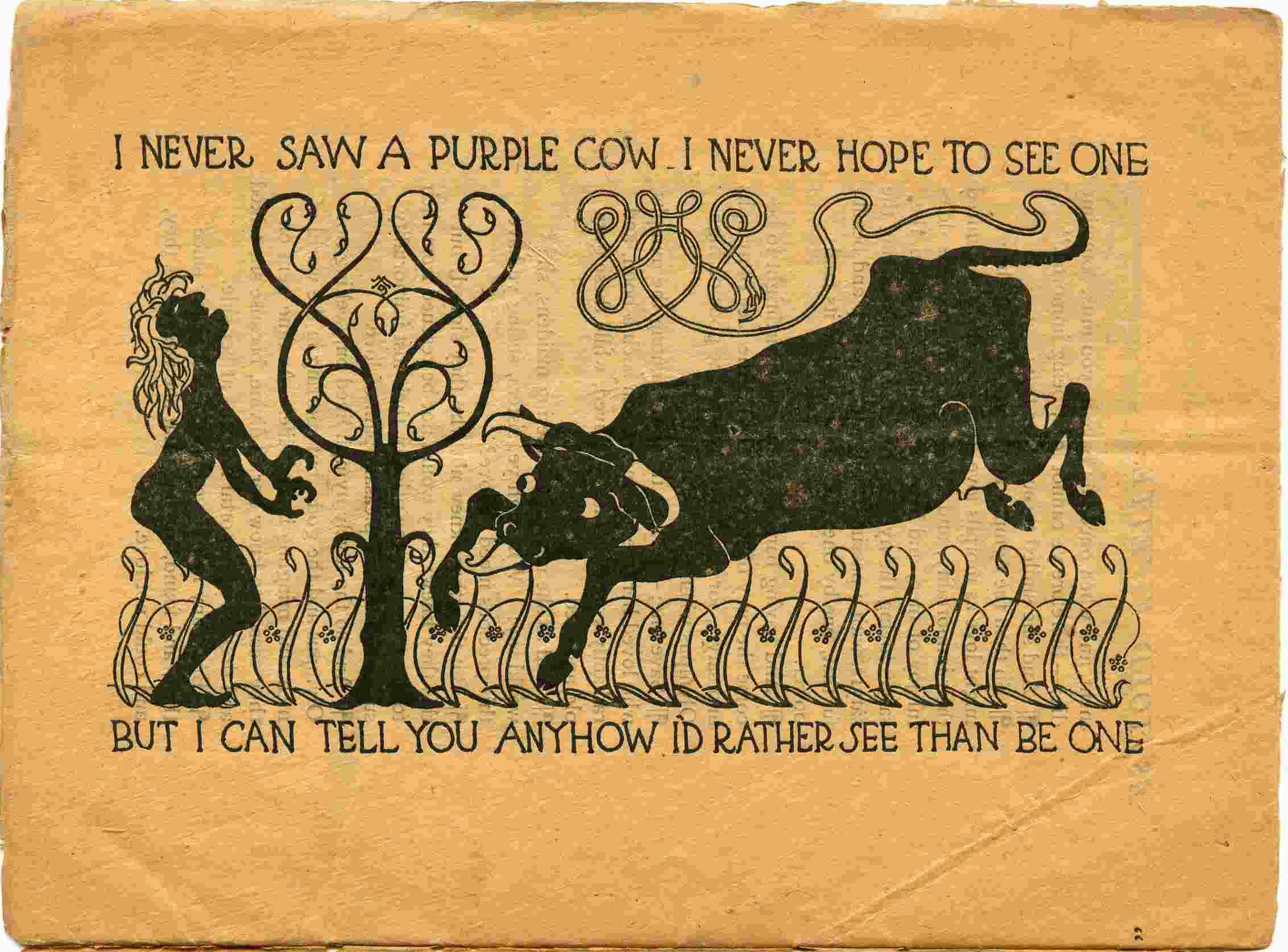
The original "Purple Cow", from 1895

"Purple Cow" is a short nonsense poem by American writer Gelett Burgess. It was first published in 1895.

== Poem ==
The Purple Cow by Gelett Burgess

I never saw a Purple Cow,
I never hope to see one;
But I can tell you, anyhow,
I'd rather see than be one.

== Publication history ==
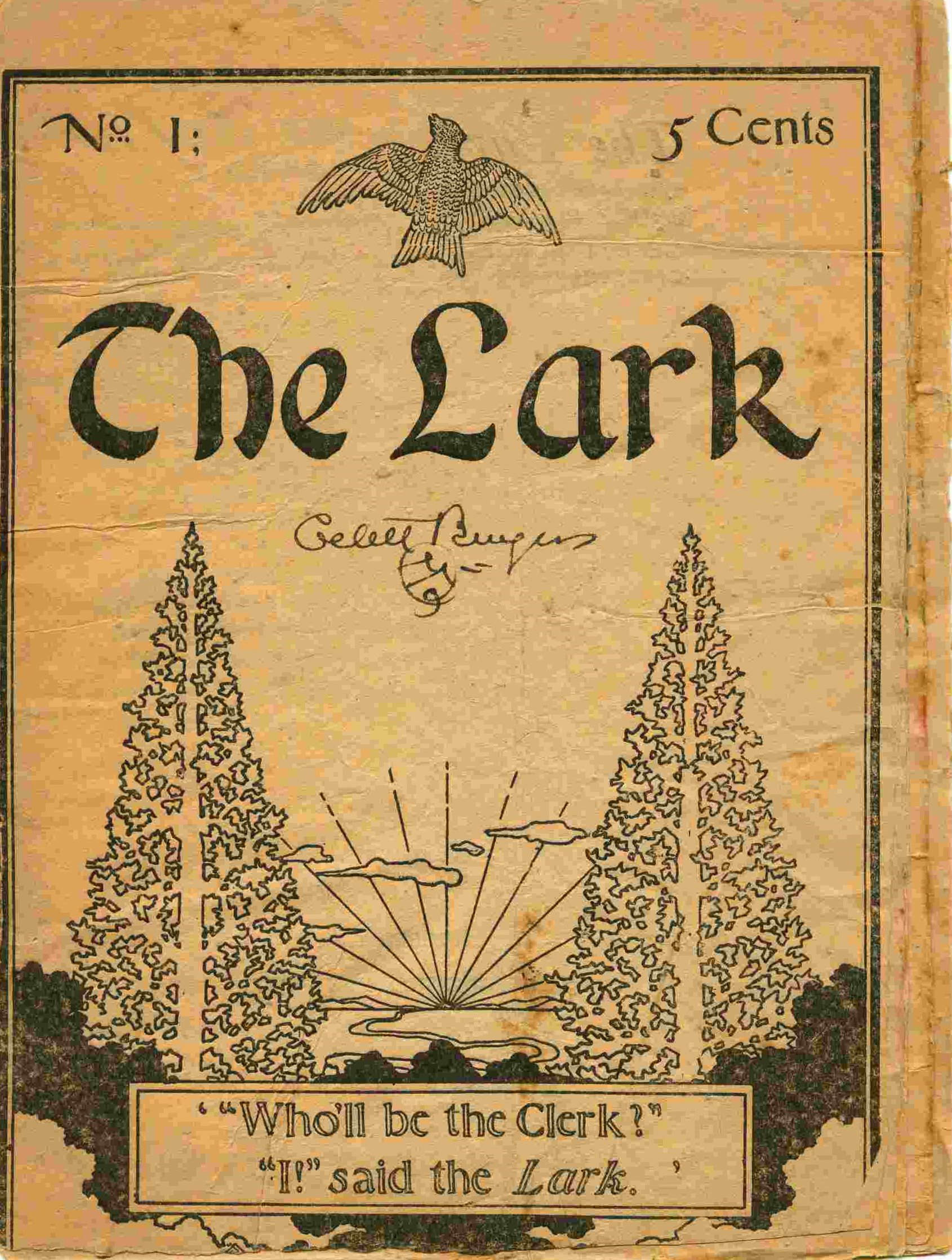
The May 1895 issue of The Lark in which Burgess's "Purple Cow" first appeared

The poem was first published in the first issue of Burgess's magazine The Lark in May 1895 and became his most widely known work. It originally had the longer title "The Purple Cow's projected feast/Reflections on a Mythic Beast/Who's Quite Remarkable, at Least". This publication of the poem also included an illustration by Burgess featuring a cow jumping over an art nouveau fence heading towards a naked human, with both the cow and the human filled in black. A poster version of his illustration is part of the collection of the Metropolitan Museum of Art.

The poem became popular, eventually becoming what one commentator called "[t]he most quoted poem in twentieth-century America, after 'The Night Before Christmas'". In addition to being widely anthologized, it was often transmitted orally without credit to Burgess. Many years after its appearance, publicist Jim Moran appeared at Burgess's home with a cow he had painted purple.

Burgess came to resent its popularity. A few years after writing the poem, Burgess wrote another short poem in response, titled "Confession: and a Portrait Too, Upon a Background that I Rue", which appeared in the final issue of The Lark in April 1897:

Ah, yes, I wrote the "Purple Cow"—
I'm Sorry, now, I wrote it;
But I can tell you Anyhow
I'll Kill you if you Quote it!

== Afterlife of the poem ==
Several parodies of "The Purple Cow" have been written by others, including O. Henry. Ogden Nash wrote a take-off of this poem, "The Abominable Snowman", beginning "I've never seen an abombinable snowman, I'm hoping not to see one..."

United States President Harry S. Truman was once asked by UFO researcher and publisher James W. Moseley if he'd ever seen a UFO. Truman reportedly responded by reciting lines from Burgess's poem.

"Purple Cow Creamery" is also the name of the creamery owned by Meijer stores which creates their Purple Cow brand ice cream. The Purple Cow brand started in 1934 and was an ice cream shop inside of Meijer stores starting in the 1960s. The name is based on Burgess's poem shared by founder Fred Meijer to his three sons. Fred Meijer handed out cards for free ice cream at any Meijer Purple Cow ice cream shop to customers as part of a promotional campaign.

The "Purple Cow Drive-In" ice-cream stand in Crimora, Virginia has a purple cow head on a post. Its status as a local landmark led to the naming of Purple Cow Road.

Marketer Seth Godin has used the phrase "Purple Cow" for the concept of marketing a product as "intrinsically different" in his book, Purple Cow: Transform Your Business by Being Remarkable. The phrase has also been used for the marketing concept of choosing a name which "makes your audience stop in their tracks and wonder why the title was chosen."

A purple cow is the mascot of Williams College, a private liberal arts college in Williamstown, Massachusetts, which was named after the college's humor magazine Purple Cow, which, in turn, took its name from Burgess's poem.

A slightly modified version of the final line of the poem is referenced in the book Fletch and the Man Who (1983) by Gregory Mcdonald in the line

"Irwin!" Roy Filby echoed. "I'd rather see one than be one!"

in which Filby is making fun of not only Fletch but his albatross of a first name, which is a recurring theme in the series of books.

Purple Cow is a pipe tobacco blend manufactured by Cornell & Diehl blended by the late Bob Runowski and crafted for the Chicago Pipe Show years ago.
