= Gelett Burgess =

American artist (1866–1951)

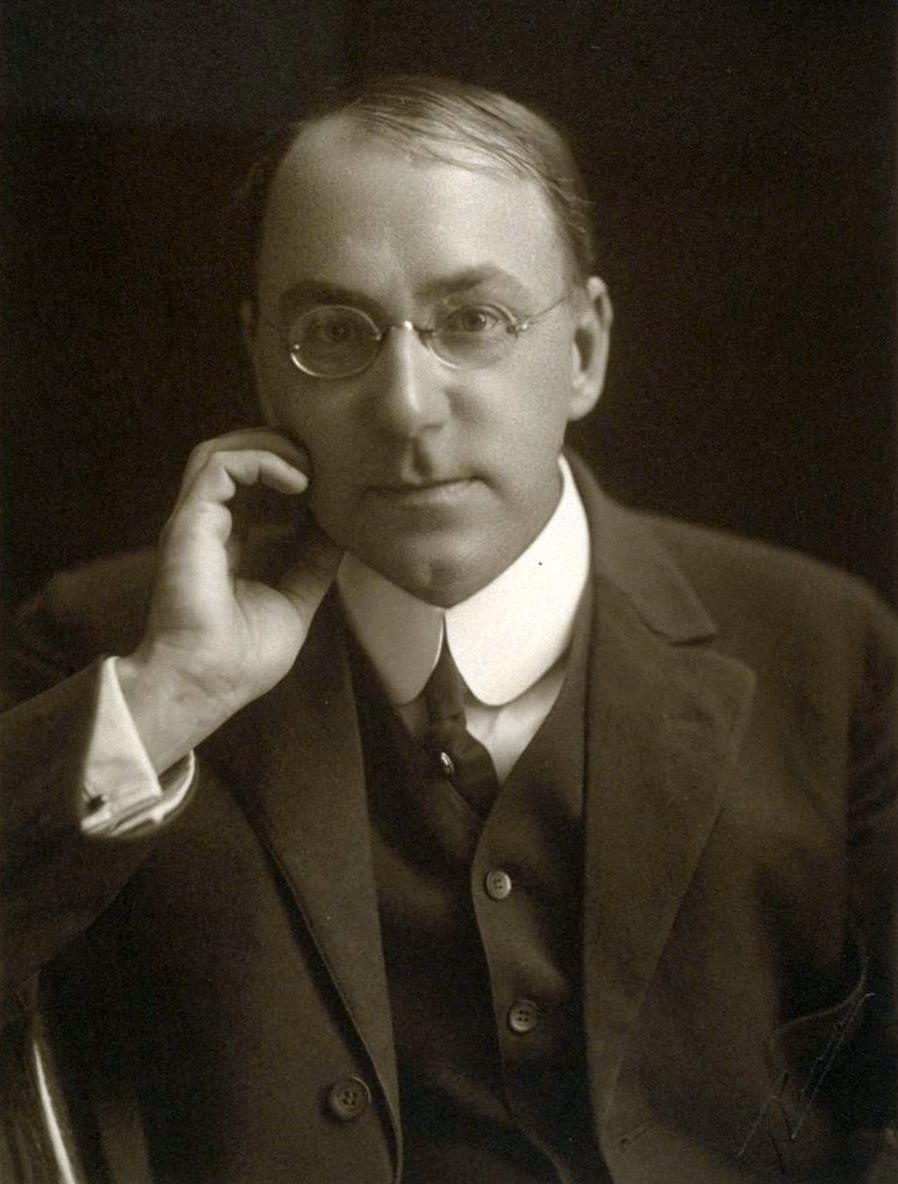
- Circa 1910
- Born: Frank Gelett Burgess; January 30, 1866; Boston, Massachusetts, US
- Died: September 18, 1951 (aged 85); Carmel-by-the-Sea, California, US
- Occupations: Novelist, Engineer
- Writing career
- Notable works: The Purple Cow, The Wild Men of Paris
- Movement: West Coast Response to the European Decadent movement

Frank Gelett Burgess (January 30, 1866 – September 18, 1951) was an American artist, art critic, poet, author and humorist. He was an important figure in the San Francisco Bay Area literary renaissance of the 1890s, particularly through his iconoclastic little magazine, The Lark, and association with The Crowd literary group. He is best known as a writer of nonsense verse, such as "The Purple Cow", and for introducing French modern art to the United States in an essay titled "The Wild Men of Paris." He was the illustrator of the Goops murals, in Coppa's restaurant, in the Montgomery Block and author of the popular Goops books. Burgess coined the term "blurb."

== Early life ==
Born in Boston, Burgess was "raised among staid, conservative New England gentry". He attended the Massachusetts Institute of Technology, graduating with a B.S. in 1887. After graduation, Burgess fled conservative Boston for the livelier bohemia of San Francisco, where he worked as a draftsman for the Southern Pacific Railroad. In 1891, he was hired by the University of California at Berkeley as an instructor of topographical drawing.

== Cogswell fountain incident ==
In 1894, Burgess lost his job at Berkeley as a result of his involvement in an attack on one of San Francisco's three Cogswell fountains, free water fountains named after the pro-temperance advocate Henry Cogswell who had donated them to the city in 1883. As The San Francisco Call noted a year before the incident, Cogswell's message, combined with his enormous image, irritated many:

It is supposed to convey a lesson on temperance, as the doctor stands proudly on the pedestal, with his whiskers flung to the rippling breezes. In his right hand he holds a temperance pledge rolled up like a sausage, and the other used to contain a goblet overflowing with heaven's own nectar. But wicked boys shattered the emblem of teetotalism with their pea-shooters and now the doctor's heart is heavy within him.

In response, numerous acts of minor vandalism had been inflicted upon the fountain.

Four iron posts with ornate lamps at the top originally graced the corners of this gurgling example of temperance, but now they lean and lurch and pitch like a drunken quadrille. Beer wagons heavy laden humped into the posts, shattered the stained-glass lamps and destroyed their equilibrium. Some of the lamps are canted over like a tipsy man's hat, and the whole group presents a most convivial aspect.

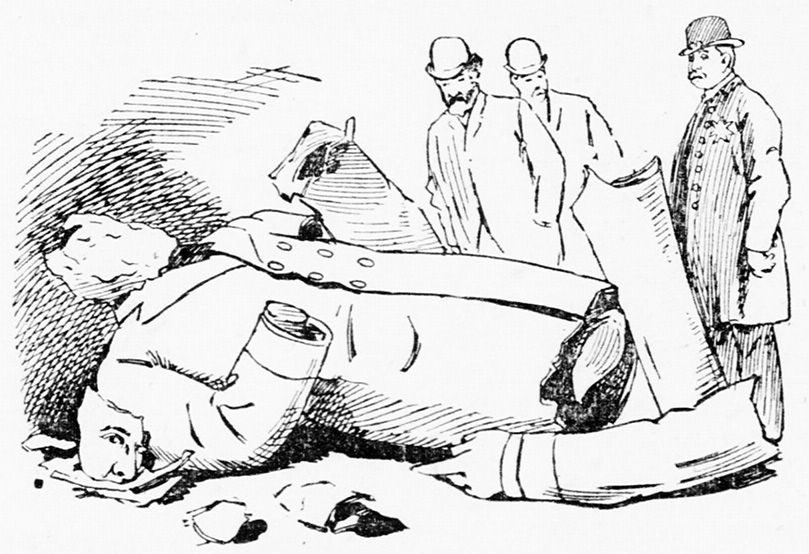
1894 illustration of the fountain after the incident, from The San Francisco Call

The toppling incident took place in the early hours of January 1, 1894. As the Call reported,

Some iconoclastic spirits, probably made bold by too freely indulging in the convivialities of New Year's day, found vent for their destructive proclivities in the small hours of the morning yesterday. With the greatest deliberation, apparently, a rope was coiled around the mock presentment of Dr. Cogswell and with a strong pull, and all together, he was toppled from his fountain pedestal at the Junction of California and Market streets.

The newspaper noted that "no one professes to have knowledge of the perpetrators of the outrage," and no arrests had been, or were, made. However, Burgess's involvement was suspected and is generally viewed as the reason for his resignation from the university, reported by the Call on March 10, 1894, with the note that the resignation was "to take effect with the close of the year."

Burgess is now held in high regard at the University of California, Berkeley as a former professor and literary talent. A selection of his original works and his papers are housed in the Bancroft Library on the Berkeley campus.

== The Lark and its descendants ==
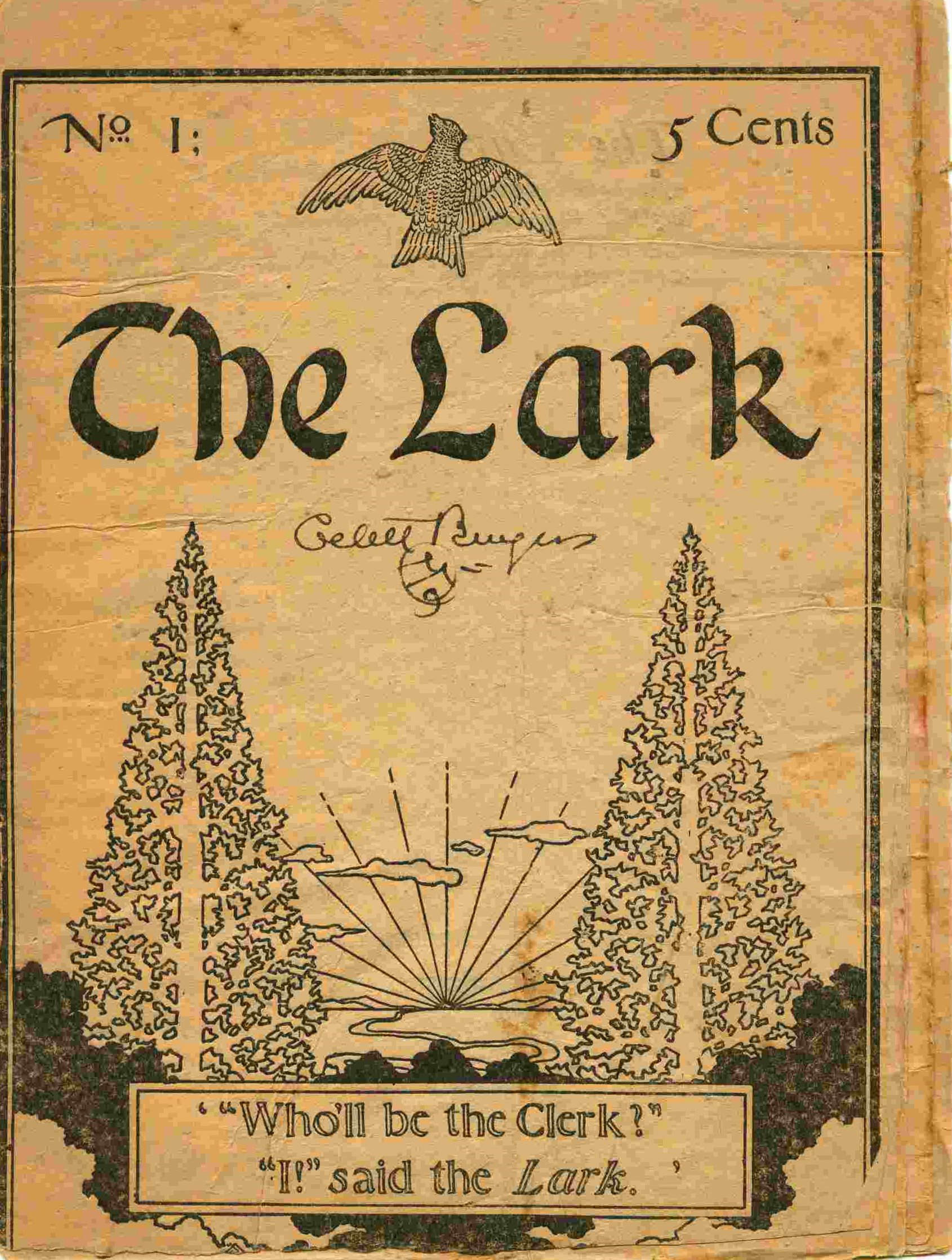
The 1895 issue of The Lark in which Burgess's "Purple Cow" first appeared

Burgess's departure from the university became an opportunity to reconsider his professional aspirations. With a group of like-minded associates, he founded in 1895 a humorous little magazine entitled The Lark. "The double meaning of its name was intended. While it would sing at heaven's gate, it would do so as a merry adventure and have fun with the little-magazine movement."

The Lark was more successful than its makers intended, eventually reaching a circulation of over 3,000. Before the official publication date, local publisher/bookseller William Doxey, intrigued by the first number, agreed to act as official publisher of the venture. Volume 1, number 1 of the 16-page monthly appeared on May Day: May 1, 1895.

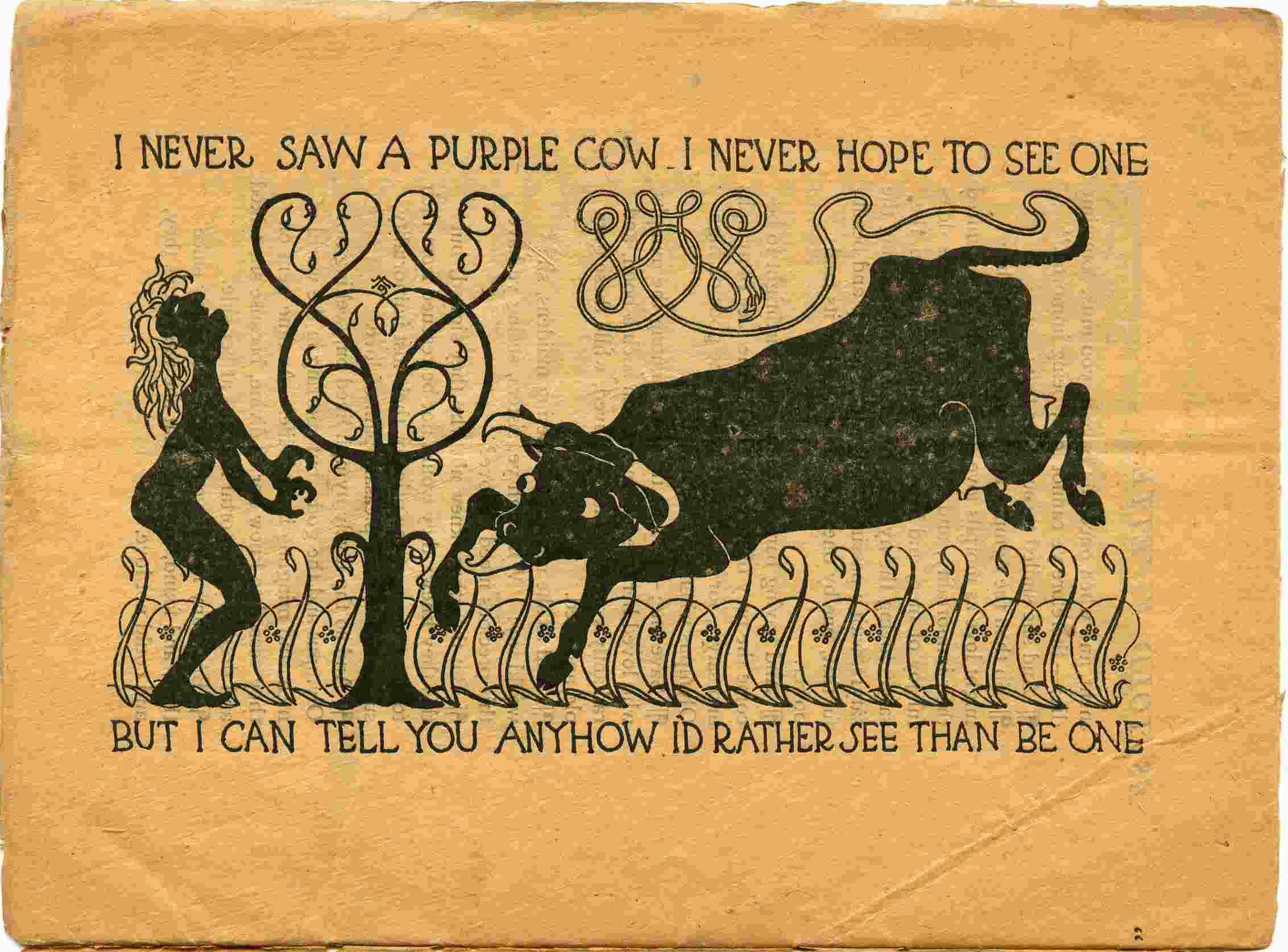
The original "Purple Cow" from 1895

I never saw a purple cow
I never hope to see one;
But I can tell you, anyhow,
I'd rather see than be one!

"The Purple Cow" (the full title was "The Purple Cow: Reflections on a Mythic Beast Who's Quite Remarkable, at Least"), an illustrated four-line poem that appeared in the first number of The Lark, was to remain the ne plus ultra of nonsense verse that Burgess would spend his life unsuccessfully attempting to surpass.

At first, the magazine was edited and written primarily by Burgess, who took great delight in creating pseudonyms for himself. For example, in volume 1, four of the other "authors" are Burgess writing under different names.

The magazine soon attracted an eclectic group of contributors who hung out at the Montgomery Block building, who became known as "Les Jeunes" (English: the youth). Burgess was initially assisted by writer-artist Bruce Porter. These included Porter Garnett (who also took on editorial responsibilities), Carolyn Wells, Willis Polk, Yone Noguchi, and others. Local artists, including Ernest Peixotto, Florence Lundborg and Maynard Dixon, contributed illustrations and cover designs.

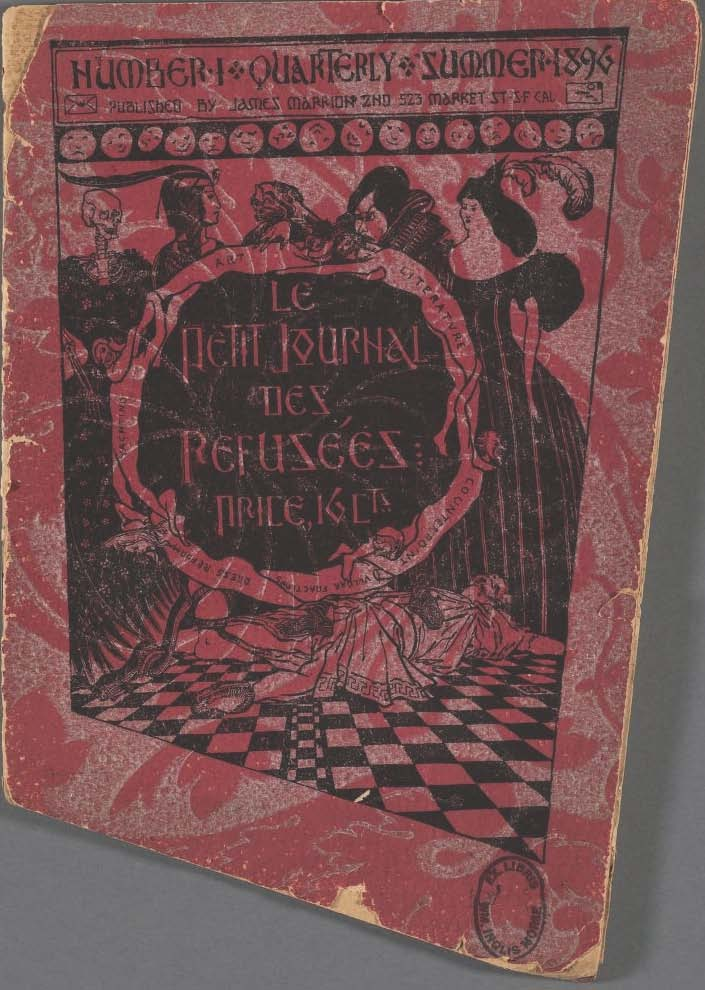
Le Petit journal des refusées, 1896

Number 24 of The Lark (April 1897) was declared to be the last, but a final issue, number 25 entitled The Epi-Lark, was published May 1, 1897.

By this point, Burgess had become thoroughly sick of "The Purple Cow", and wrote the following "Confession: and a Portrait Too, Upon a Background that I Rue" in The Lark, number 24 (April 1, 1897).

Ah, yes, I wrote the "Purple Cow"—
I'm Sorry, now, I wrote it;
But I can tell you Anyhow
I'll Kill you if you Quote it!

"Purple Cow" has been used as a brand name.

Subsequently, Burgess and publisher William Doxey recycled Burgess's contributions in such productions as The Purple Cow (1899) and The Lark Almanack (1899).

Another Lark spinoff, created by Burgess and friends one night in 1896, is Le Petit Journal des Refusées. Purporting to be composed of material written by women and rejected by other magazines, Le Petit Journal des Refusées was printed on wallpaper and cut to an irregular shape. It was announced with a mock call for submissions in the sixth issue of The Lark.

== New York, France, later life ==
Burgess moved to New York City, where he wrote several books and articles for magazines including The Smart Set, Collier's, and Century. He made several trips to France and was evidently fluent in French. Eventually he returned to California, where he died in Carmel-by-the-Sea in 1951.

In 1919, Rollin Lynde Hartt published an article about Burgess as one of "the funniest men who ever lived," which appeared in newspapers nationwide.

Burgess married Estelle Loomis at a Unitarian church in New York City in June 1914, and they were honeymooning in France when World War I broke out. A writer in her own right, Estelle Loomis worked on a number of literary projects throughout her marriage with Burgess, the two conferring together on each other's work. She was also an actress and a beauty contest winner. She was photographed shortly before their marriage by Arnold Genthe. Burgess and Loomis remained married until her death in 1947; however, she frequently suffered from illness and fatigue. They had no children.

== The Wild Men of Paris ==
Leading up to 1910, one year before the scandalous group exhibiting that brought "Cubism" to the attention of the general public, Burgess wrote an influential article titled, The Wild Men of Paris. This illustrated text introduced Proto-Cubist art in the United States for the first time. It included the first reproduction of Pablo Picasso's Les Demoiselles d'Avignon.

Written after his visit to the 1910 Salon des Indépendants—the well-established anti-establishment art exhibition in Paris—the article drew from interviews with Henri Matisse, Pablo Picasso, Georges Braque, André Derain, Othon Friesz, Jean Metzinger, Auguste Herbin and Béla Czóbel. The Wild Men of Paris was partly humorous but partly serious.

Burgess wrote of Matisse's 1907 painting Blue Nude (Souvenir de Biskra) in humorist fashion:

There were no limits to the audacity and the ugliness of the canvasses. Still-life sketches of round, round apples and yellow, yellow oranges, on square, square tables, seen in impossible perspective; landscapes of squirming trees, with blobs of virgin color gone wrong, fierce greens and coruscating yellows, violent purples, sickening reds and shuddering blues.

But the nudes! They looked like flayed Martians, like pathological charts—hideous old women, patched with gruesome hues, lopsided, with arms like the arms of a Swastika, sprawling on vivid backgrounds, or frozen stiffly upright, glaring through misshapen eyes, with noses or fingers missing. They defied anatomy, physiology, almost geometry itself!

== Other literary works ==
Burgess's completely serious writings include "War the Creator", an account of a young man he had met in Paris in July 1914, and saw again as a wounded soldier a few months later: "a boy who, in two months, became a man."

Burgess wrote and illustrated several children's books about the habits of strange, baldheaded, idiosyncratic childlike creatures he called the Goops. He created the syndicated comic strip Goops in 1924, and worked on it to its end in 1925.

His books The Maxims of Methuselah and The Maxims of Noah were illustrated by Louis D. Fancher.

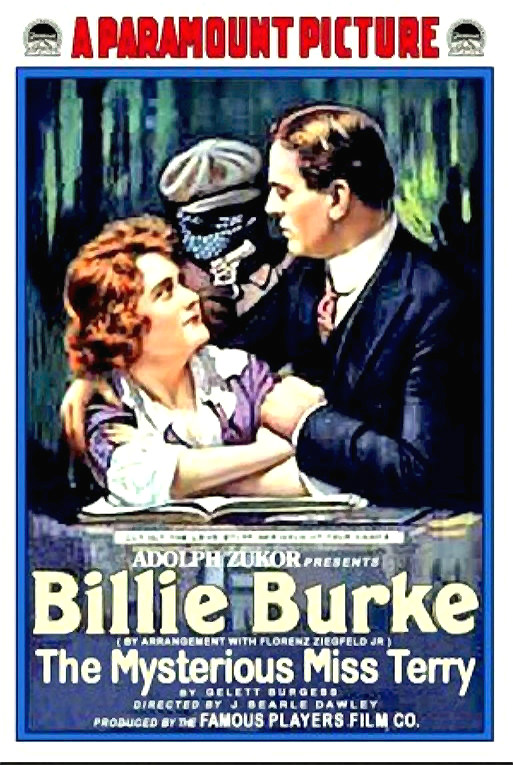
1917 silent drama film The Mysterious Miss Terry, based on a story by Burgess

== Film adaptations ==
Many of Burgess's works were adapted for the screen, beginning with The Persistent Mr. Prince, a short film released by Vitagraph in 1914. Two films based on Burgess's stories were released in 1917, The Mysterious Miss Terry and The Countess Charming. Burgess's novel The White Cat (1907) was adapted into two films, The Two-Soul Woman (1918) and The Untameable (1923). A Manhattan Knight (1920) was adapted from Burgess's novel Find the Woman. The Heart Line (1921) was based on Burgess's novel of the same name. The Caveman (1926) was adapted from Burgess's 1915 play. All of these were silent films.

In the sound film era, Burgess's novel Two O'Clock Courage was adapted into the 1936 film Two in the Dark and the 1945 movie Two O'Clock Courage.

== Legacy ==
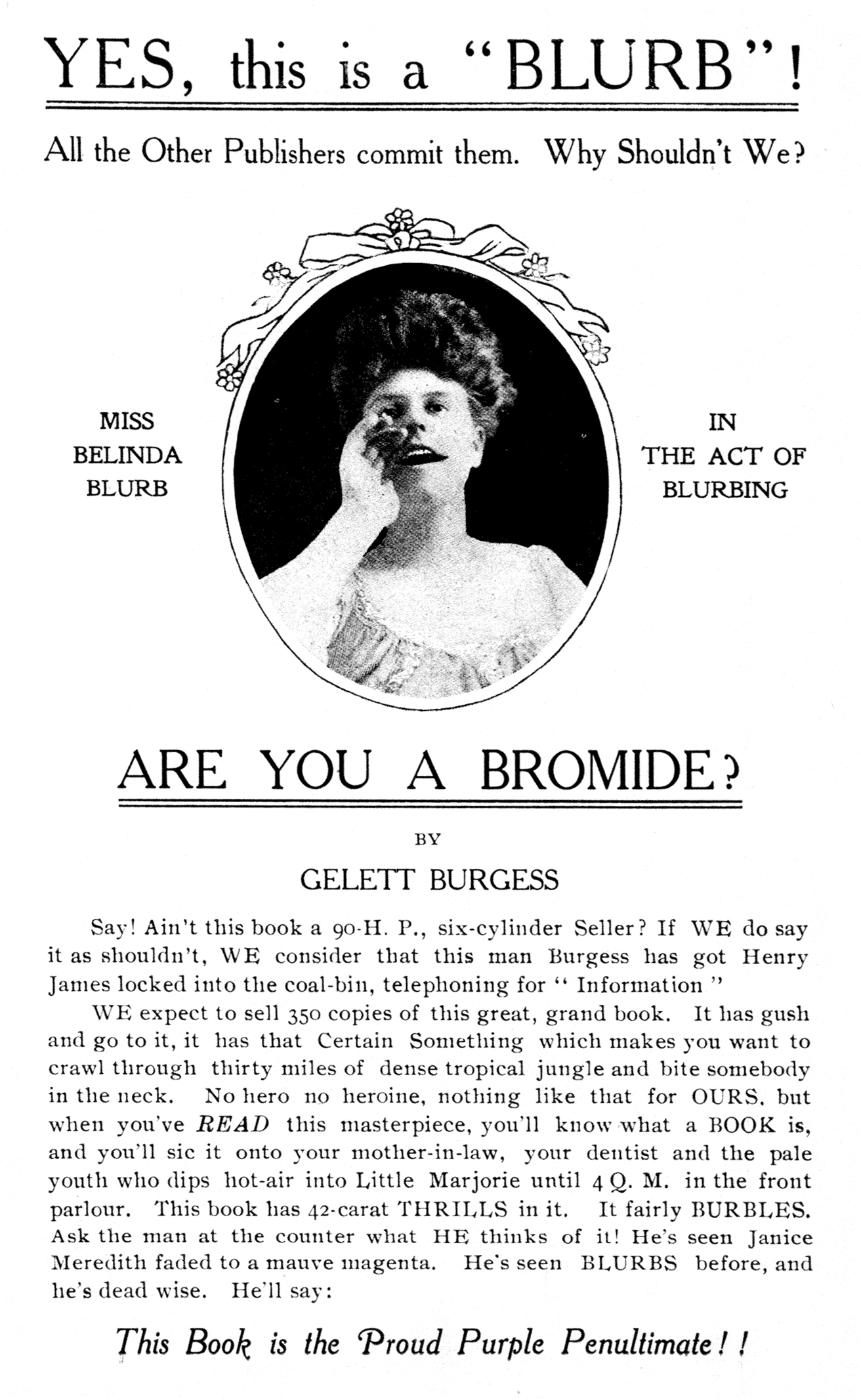
The 1906 front dust jacket of Burgess's Are You a Bromide? coins the word "blurb".

The word "blurb", meaning a short description of a book, film, or other product written for promotional purposes, was coined by Burgess in 1906, in attributing the dust jacket of his book, Are You a Bromide?, to a "Miss Belinda Blurb" depicted "in the act of blurbing". His definition of "blurb" is "a flamboyant advertisement; an inspired testimonial".

In that book "Are You a Bromide?" and related essay "The Sulphitic Theory", Burgess is credited for coining the usage of the word "bromide" as a personification of a sedate, dull person who said boring things. Bromide meant either the boring person himself or the trite statement of that person.

In his blurb for Are You a Bromide?, Burgess mentions a popular book titled Janice Meredith, which was written by Paul Leicester Ford, and published in 1899 by Dodd Mead. Janice Meredith happens to be one of the first books to have a blurb on its dust jacket. It was originally printed with a blue cover, and Burgess' humorous mention (in 1906) that its cover has "faded to a mauve magenta", seems to be a suggestion that it is time for a new book.

The Gelett Burgess Center for Creative Expression was formed in Burgess's name in Portland, Oregon, in December 2011 to promote "family-friendly books" to parents and educators. Annually, the Gelett Burgess Children's Book Award is given in his honor to the top children's books of the year.

Burgess founded the San Francisco Boys' Club Association, now the Boys & Girls Clubs of San Francisco, in 1891 and became its first president. The club was the first of its kind west of the Mississippi River.

Burgess was a friend of the British writer Oliver Onions, and encouraged Onions to write fiction.

== Works ==
- "Vivette" (1897); novelette
- The Lively City O'Ligg (1899); juvenile
- Goops, and How to be Them (1900); juvenile
- A Gage of Youth (1901); poems, chiefly from The Lark
- The Burgess Nonsense Book (1901); prose and verse
- The Romance of the Commonplace (1901)
- More Goops, and How Not to Be Them (1903); juvenile
- The Reign of Queen Isyl (1903); short stories in collaboration with Will Irwin
- The Picaroons (1904); short stories in collaboration with Will Irwin
- The Rubaiyat of Omar Cayenne (1904); satire
- Goop Tales Alphabetically Told (1904); juvenile
- A Little Sister of Destiny (1904); short stories
- Are You a Bromide? (1906); short book, Open source e-book (California Digital Library)
- The White Cat (1907); novel
- The Heart Line (1907); novel, e-book (Internet Archive)
- The Maxims of Methuselah (1907); satire
- Blue Goops and Red (1909); juvenile
- Lady Mechante (1909); novel
- Find the Woman (1911); novel
- The Master of Mysteries (1912)
- The Maxims of Noah (1913)
- The Goop Directory (1913); juvenile
- "War, the Creator" (magazine essay 1915, book 1916)
- Mrs. Hope's Husband (1917)
- The Goop Encyclopedia: Containing Every Child's Every Fault (1916); juvenile
- My maiden effort; being the personal confessions of well-known American authors as to their literary beginnings, authors noted with their books explaining their first literary success
- Have You an Educated Heart? (1923)
- Ain't Angie Awful (1923)
- Why Be a Goop? (1924); juvenile
- Why Men Hate Women (1927)
- Two O'Clock Courage (1934)
- Look Eleven Years Younger (1937)
- The Goop Song Book (1941), music by Elizabeth Merz Butterfield
- New Goops and How To Know Them (1951); juvenile
