= Goops =

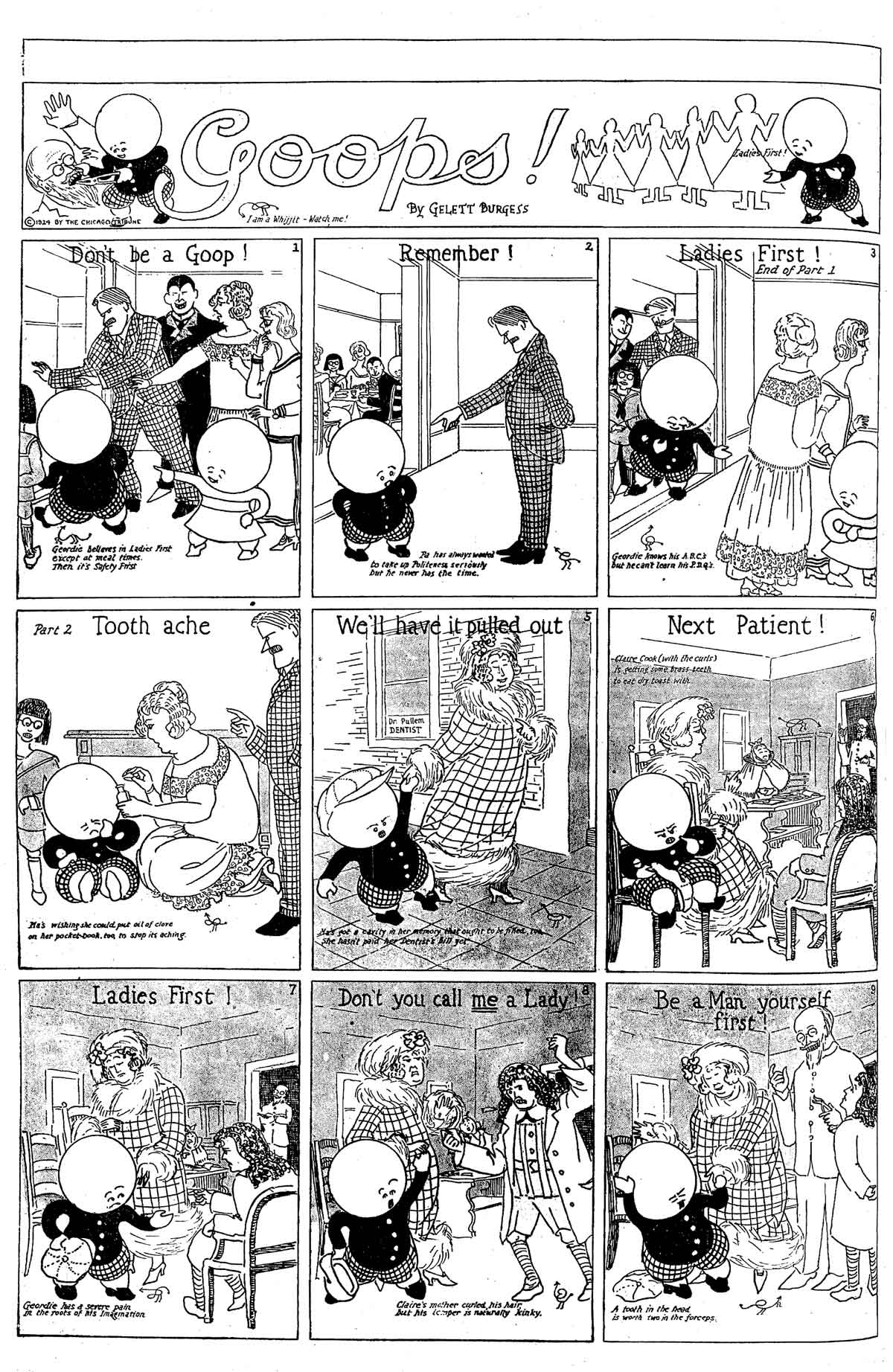
Gelett Burgess' Goops (April 6, 1924)

The Goops books, originally published between 1900 and 1950, were created by the artist, art critic, poet, author and humorist Gelett Burgess. The characters debuted, conceptually, in the illustrations of Burgess' publication The Lark, in the late 19th century. The Goops also appeared in panels in the popular monthly children's publication St. Nicholas, as early as 1898. The Goops series is among his most famous works.

Since the publication of the original Goops book, Goops and How to Be Them, in 1900, the series has come to be seen as the quintessential series on teaching children the importance of manners and polite behavior. A librarian in 1927 observed that adults recommend the Goops books to children but that children do not care for the preaching or the pictures.

Though widely circulated during the height of Burgess' popularity, some of the Goops books have become difficult to find. Goops and How to Be Them and More Goops and How Not to Be Them are still widely available. Out-of-print titles such as Goops Encyclopedia and Blue Goops and Red may be found in rare book rooms and antiquarian bookstores.

In addition to the books, Burgess created the syndicated comic strip Goops in 1924 and worked on it through its end in 1925.

Elizabeth Metz Butterfield of Jamestown, N.Y. set a number of Burgess' Goop poems to music. They were published under the name The Goop Songbook.

== Books ==
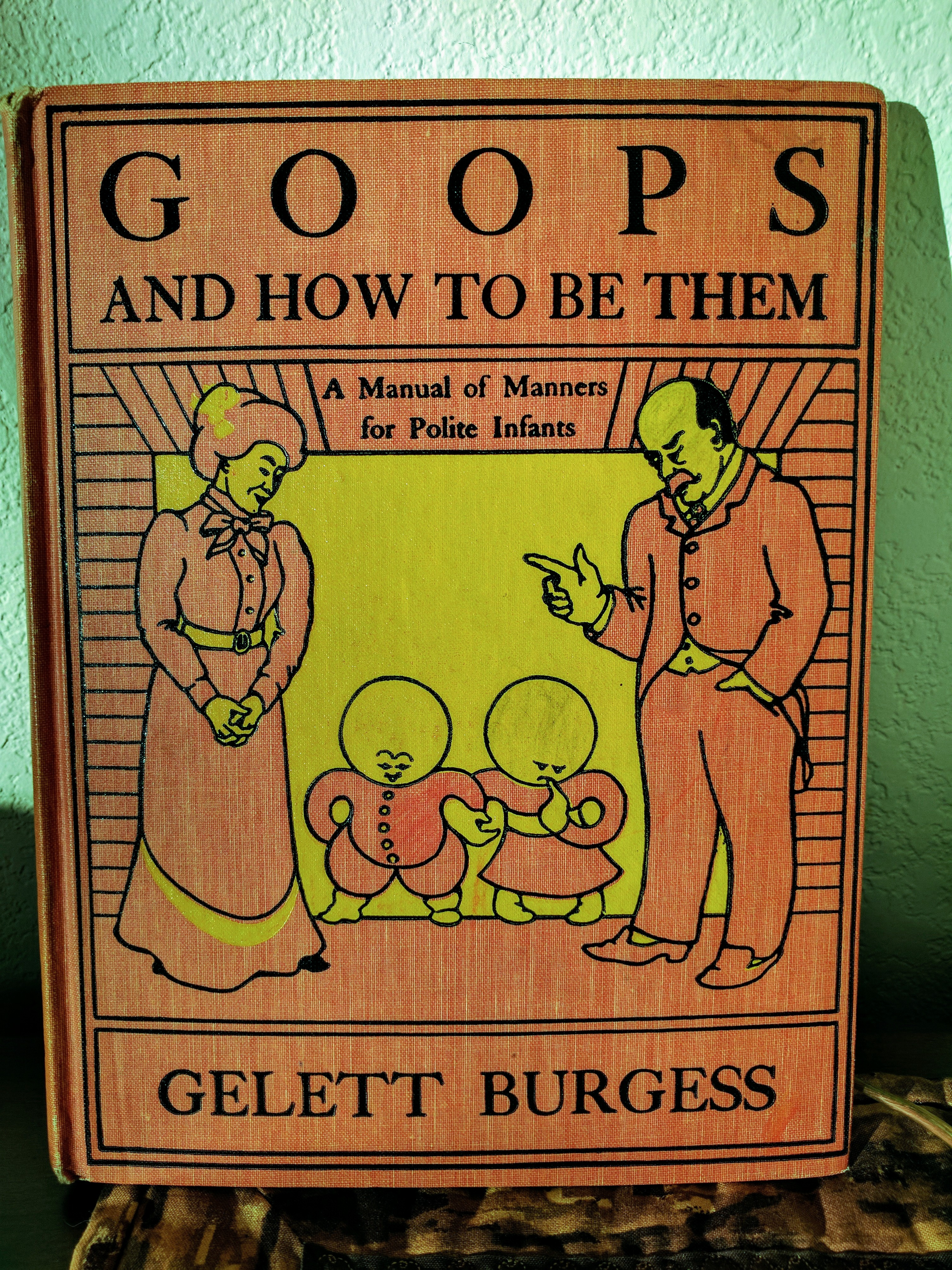
Goops and How to Be Them: A Manual of Manners for Polite Infants (1900) book cover

- Goops and How to Be Them (1900) Juvenile
- More Goops and How Not to Be Them (1903) Juvenile
- Goop Tales Alphabetically Told (1904) Juvenile
- Blue Goops and Red (1909) Juvenile
- The Goop Directory of Juvenile Offenders (1913) Juvenile
- The Goop Encyclopedia: Containing Every Child's Every Fault (1916) Juvenile
- Why Be a Goop? (1924) Juvenile
- New Goops and How to Know Them (1951) Juvenile

== Sources ==
- Bleiler, Everett (1948). The Checklist of Fantastic Literature. Chicago: Shasta Publishers. p. 65.
- Strickler, Dave. Syndicated Comic Strips and Artists, 1924-1995: The Complete Index. Cambria, California: Comics Access, 1995. ISBN 0-9700077-0-1.
