= The Road to Memphis (novel) =

1990 novel by Mildred D. Taylor

- First edition (US)
- Author: Mildred D. Taylor
- Language: English
- Subject: Race relations
- Genre: Historical fiction
- Publisher: Dial (US); Gollancz (UK)
- Publication date: 1990
- Publication place: United States
- Media type: Hardcover and Paperback
- Pages: 304
- Awards: 1991 Coretta Scott King Author Award
- ISBN: 978-0140360776
- Preceded by: The Gold Cadillac
- Followed by: The Land

The Road to Memphis is a historical fiction novel written by Mildred D. Taylor. It was first published in 1990 by Dial Press. It is the fifth book in the saga following: Song of the Trees (1975), Roll of Thunder, Hear my Cry (1976), Let the Circle Be Unbroken (1981), and The Gold Cadillac (1987). Chronologically, this is the second to last book in the series to focus on the Logans. A prequel, The Land, was released in 2001. Taylor then released the final book in the entire saga, a sequel to The Road to Memphis titled, All the Days Past, All the Days to Come, in January 2020.

== Summary ==
The Road to Memphis begins in 1941 and the saga's narrator, Cassie Logan, is now 17 years old. While Cassie continues her education, her older brother Stacey has started working. He surprises the family with a brand new car, a '38 wine-colored Ford. The brand new car attracts unwanted attention from Charlie Simms who attempts to force Stacey to use his new car to pull his car out of a ditch. Jeremy Simms, a tentative friend of Stacey, is too afraid of his father to help deescalate the situation. Ultimately Stacey avoids damaging his car by pushing the car out manually.

Later, Cassie goes on a coon hunting trip with her brothers and their friends, Little Willie, Clarence, and Harris. While hunting, they run into Jeremy Simms and his cousins, the Aames brothers. Harris, one of Cassie's friends, is chased by Aames brothers' dogs until he suffers a broken leg and is knocked unconscious. Jeremy Simms tries apologizing but Stacey refuses to forgive him, thinking that Jeremy has indeed changed just as his father and uncle have long warned.

Cassie leaves for school in Jackson only to return in November for the funeral of Great Faith Church's preacher. At the funeral, Cassie learns that one of her friends, Sissy, is pregnant. Sissy refuses to reveal the identity of the child's father and teases that it may be anyone in Stacey's friend group. Sissy leaves the funeral and Cassie runs after her, trying to solve the mystery. Sissy confides in Cassie that she knows it is in fact Clarence, her lover, who is on an overnight pass from the Army and refuses to marry her. On Cassie's way back to the church, the Aames brothers driving along the road catcall and attempt to trap her along the road. David Logan gets to Cassie just in time and reminds Cassie that she cannot walk roads alone. When she gets back to the church, Cassie ultimately betrays Sissy and tells Clarence her plan. Clarence confronts Sissy and without resolution, catches a ride with Stacey and the rest of his friends. He asks Stacey to stop in the town of Strawberry for some BC Powder. While in Strawberry, Stacy must stop to make his car payments to Wade Jamison, a friendly white attorney and must also repair a low tire. As the group runs their errands, they once again encounter the Aames brothers, who claim Clarence has lost his manners since being in the Army. They demand Clarence let them rub his head for "good luck" and Clarence has no choice but obey. Later, as the group picks up Stacey's car from the garage and run into Sissy, Harris, Little Man, and Christopher-John, the Aames brothers attempt to subject Moe to the same embarrassing treatment. Moe snaps when the Aames brothers make more suggestive comments towards Cassie, hitting two of the brothers with a crowbar. The brothers threaten to lynch Moe. Jeremy, who had been accompanying his cousins, lets Moe hide in the back of his truck. To make up for the past, he agrees to drop Moe off in Jackson until the group can decide what to do next.

When Cassie, Stacey, Clarence, Little Willie, and cousin Oliver get to Jackson, Moe and Jeremy are nowhere to be found. Stacey tells Cassie to stay behind at the local restaurant while they look for Moe. Cassie encounters a man named Solomon Bradley, a lawyer, who she finds both attractive and challenging. Later, Moe and Jeremy are finally found. Mr. Jamison tells the group that Moe should leave Mississippi or face criminal offense charges. Stacey, Clarence, Little Willie, and Cassie decide to drive Moe to Memphis where he can take a train to Chicago.

On their way to Memphis, they stop at a rest stop and white men harass them. Cassie is also assaulted when caught using a whites only indoor restroom. Stacey must drive away in a hurry and in the process, the car breaks down in the forest. The group rests in the broken down car for the night. In the morning, they awake to find not only that white men at the rest stop made a gash in the side of Stacey's car, but that the Ford still will not start. Little Willie and Stacey go to look for a spare part while Moe and Cassie stay behind to look after an ailing Clarence. Moe, who has harbored a conspicuous crush on Cassie, kisses her. Soon after, men in the woods find them and assist them with getting a spare part for Stacey's car. Before they can continue their journey, Clarence begins screaming about the pain of his headache, running out of the car knocking himself unconscious. The area's white hospital refuses to admit him but they get help from a local Black woman who agrees to care for him while the rest of the group continues the journey.

Once they get to Memphis, they learn of the Attack on Pearl Harbor. As they wait in Memphis for a train and Stacey gets maintenance on the car, they stay at the home of Solomon Bradley. It turns out that Solomon Bradley also works for a newspaper. Cassie and Solomon's romance develops, which Moe discovers. When Moe finally gets a train ticket to Chicago, he tells Cassie what he did not get the chance to do in the woods: that he has loved her for a long time and he wanted to marry her after he gets a better education.

With Moe on his way to Chicago, Cassie, Stacey, and Little Willie return to Mississippi. They stop to pick up Clarence but learn that he has died from the headache, leaving behind a letter for Sissy. They go back to Mississippi broken-hearted, only to find more trouble. Harris is being arrested for suspicion that he helped Moe escape. Jeremy Simms eventually reveals that he was in fact the culprit and is disowned by his father for being a "nigger lover."

Later, the group attempts to tell Sissy that Clarence is dead but she refuses to believe it, crying and screaming in the woods. Stacey and Cassie go home. Jeremy comes over and tells Stacey he is sorry for his part in injuring Harris and that he is leaving Mississippi to join the army. He tells Stacey he will never forget him or the fun times they had as children. Stacey listens and forgives Jeremy. The next day, Stacey returns to Jackson, with Cassie following a day later. The story closes with the fact that they never see Jeremy again.

== Characters ==
=== The Logan family ===
- Cassie Logan: A 17-year-old girl who narrates this story. She is spunky and witty. She feels she has no time for love and wants to finish school before thinking about men. However, she starts to fall for Solomon Bradley.
- Stacey Logan: Cassie's 20-year-old brother. He is protective of his little sister as well as prideful.
- Christopher-John Logan: Cassie and Stacey's second younger brother who is 15 years old. He has a good sense of hearing and doesn't like to go against his parents' wishes.
- Clayton Chester "Little Man" Logan: Cassie, Stacey, and Christopher-John's youngest brother. He is a year younger than Christopher-John and likes to have his clothes neat and clean.
- David Logan: The head of the Logan household and father of the children above. He is strong and the proud owner of over 400 acres (1.6 km^{2}) of land, a rarity for a black man in Mississippi.
- Mary Logan: David's wife and mother of the Logan children.
- Caroline "Big Ma" Logan: David's mother who lives on the 400-acre (1.6 km^{2}) land plot with her son and grandchildren.
- Oliver Reams: Cassie and Stacey's cousin who lives in Jackson. He is a year older than Stacey and is apprehensive about putting so much trust in a white boy like Jeremy.
- Uncle Hammer Logan: David's brother who lives in Chicago who Stacey advises Moe to go live with him.

=== Other characters ===
- Moe Turner: Stacey's friend from childhood. He is not as talkative as his other friends but his opinion is well respected. Later in the book he tells Cassie he is in love with her.
- Jeremy Simms: A white boy who has been a secret friend to the Logan family for years. He is often whipped by his father for associating with black people. He joined the army later on, and never came back, presumably dead.
- Clarence Hopkins : One of Stacy's friends from childhood who is often humorous and good-natured. He suffers from a severe headache and eventually dies during the book.
- Harris Mitchum: A neighbor boy who is the same age as Cassie. He is slightly shy and timid. He has a fear of the Aames brothers.
- Aames Brothers: They include Statler, Leon and Troy. They are cousins of Jeremy and like to cause trouble especially with people of color in the community. They are injured severely after Moe hits them with a crowbar.
- Charlie Simms: Father of Jeremy and uncle to the Aames brothers. Like the Aames brothers he is not very fond of people of color in the community.
- Little Willie Wiggins (Willie): Stacy's friend from childhood. He is also very humorous and not as tall as any of his other friends.
- Solomon Bradley: A man in his mid to late 20s whom Cassie meets back in Jackson. He is handsome and works for a newspaper in Memphis. He is also a graduate from Harvard University.
- Wade Jamison: A white lawyer who is known throughout the community for helping people of color. He is the one who advises them about what to do about Moe.
- Sissy Mitchum: Clarence's girlfriend and Harris's twin sister who Cassie's grandmother says is a lot like Cassie. She does not approve of Cassie's constant hanging around with boys like her brother and Clarence. Later on it is learned she is pregnant with Clarence's child.
- Ma Dessie: A woman that Cassie, Stacy, Moe, Little Willie, and Clarence meet on their way to Memphis who tries to take care of Clarence's headache.

== Awards ==
- Coretta Scott King Award

== See also ==
- Mildred D. Taylor
- The Land
- Roll of Thunder, Hear My Cry
- Let the Circle Be Unbroken
