= Andrew Glass =

Andrew Glass may refer to:

== Sportspeople ==
- Andrew Glass (born 1989), American ice hockey player drafted in 2007, on List of Washington Capitals draft picks
- Andrew Glass (born 1989), Australian hockey goaltender with the Australia men's national inline hockey team

== Others ==
- Andrew Glass, builder of McRaven House
- Andrew Glass, illustrator of Graven Images (book)
- Andrew Glass, journalist for Politico
- Andrew Glass, musician and founding member of Solstice (progressive rock band)
- Andrew Glass, scholar who has published fragments of the Gandhāran Buddhist texts
