= Bad Girls from Valley High =

2005 comedy film by John T. Kretschmer

- Directed by: John T. Kretchmer
- Written by: Robert Locash; Andrew Lane
- Based on: A Fate Totally Worse than Death novel by Paul Fleischman
- Produced by: Sid Sheinberg; Jon Sheinberg; Bill Sheinberg
- Starring: Julie Benz; Monica Keena; Nicole Bilderback; Janet Leigh; Christopher Lloyd; Jonathan Brandis
- Cinematography: Suki Medencevic
- Edited by: Ross Albert
- Music by: Shawn K. Clement; Sean Murray
- Production company: The Bubble Factory
- Distributed by: Universal Studios Home Video
- Release date: March 22, 2005
- Running time: 84 minutes
- Country: United States
- Language: English

Bad Girls from Valley High is a 2005 American direct-to-video teen comedy body horror film starring Julie Benz, Monica Keena, Nicole Bilderback, Jonathan Brandis, Janet Leigh, Christopher Lloyd and Suzanna Urszuly. The film is based on the book A Fate Totally Worse than Death and it marked the final film roles of Leigh and Brandis.

== Plot ==
Danielle, Tiffany, and Brooke are the three richest, most popular girls in their high school, nicknamed "The Huns" due to their exclusive housing estate, Hundred Pines. Danielle and Tiffany are cruel and spiteful, whereas Brooke is kind but is easily intimidated and manipulated by Danielle and Tiffany. While the leader Danielle is used to getting what she wants, she is unable to attract lonesome ex-jock Drew due to his mourning over the death of his girlfriend Charity Chase. Although Charity was believed to have committed suicide, this wasn't the case as Danielle, Tiffany, and Brooke lured Charity to a cliff, hoping to terrorize her into breaking up with Drew, but ended up killing her by accident.

A year to the day of Charity's death, Romanian foreign exchange student Katarina arrives during the class of clumsy Media Arts Professor, Mr. Chauncey. Katarina and Drew immediately become friends. Jealous of this, Danielle tries to do everything in her power to stop this friendship from developing into love. In an attempt to get close to Drew, Danielle works at the elderly home where Drew is also working. While there, she is assigned to look after an old lady whom she believes is catatonic. Danielle, Tiffany, and Brooke use this opportunity to raid the old lady's cupboard and eat her box of chocolates.

In the following two weeks, the three girls begin to notice that something strange is happening to them, they are receiving back pains and their hair is turning gray - to their horror they discover that they are aging at a rapid speed. Danielle is suffering from bladder atrophy which leads to her constantly wetting herself and eventually wearing adult diapers, while Brooke has a chronic gas problem on account of her fiber diet. Tiffany's eyesight is also damaged and she is forced to wear glasses. They believe this has something to do with Katarina whom they now think is, in fact, Charity's ghost coming back to seek revenge. The three decide the only way to regain their youth is to kill Drew to let his spirit be with Charity. At Danielle's 18th birthday party, the three lure Drew to the same gorge where Charity died and attempt to shoot him. Katarina shows up and says she is not Charity's ghost. Danielle briefly ponders this but decides to shoot them both anyway. However, Brooke finally stands up for herself and says that they have gone too far, admitting that she lived in poverty and managed to join the Huns after winning US$56M in the local lottery. She tries to prevent Danielle from pulling the trigger to which Drew disarms her. Danielle shoots Katarina's wrist and she bleeds, meaning she is not a ghost. Unfortunately, due to Danielle being frail and also distracted by a party guest dressed in a clown suit from her party (who is secretly Chauncey eavesdropping on them the whole time) who she shoots along with Katarina, both Tiffany and Danielle are overcome from exhaustion.

Now in the old age home, Tiffany is hooked on a life support machine and Danielle is barely alive, implying it is far too late to be cured. At that moment, Mrs. Witt (the old woman who Danielle was meant to be caring for) shows up and reveals that she is Charity's grandmother. Also, while she had been briefly unable to speak due to a stroke, she had very good hearing and sight and overheard Danielle bragging about Charity's murder. Witt then reveals she poisoned the chocolate box (knowing that the girls would eat it) with an aging chemical (thanks to her late roommate's husband who worked with biological warfare technology); Brooke wasn't dying as she demonstrated self-control while Danielle and Tiffany had eaten most of the poisoned chocolate. Tiffany presumably dies during Witt's revelation, and Danielle flips the bird to Witt in response and then dies shortly afterwards.

At Danielle and Tiffany's funeral, everyone is in attendance, including Drew and Katarina (now an official couple). Brooke is also in attendance after a plastic surgeon's operation to try and improve her appearance, but only so much could be done and she still looks fifty years old. Chauncey forgives her as he knows she wasn't as cruel as Danielle and Tiffany, and she regrets what she has done. Danielle and Tiffany are then revealed to be in a luxurious room with their youth restored and are convinced that they are in heaven. But it is revealed that they are actually in hell as they are forced to forever endure the company of their school's most annoying dork, Jonathan Wharton, who is completely devoted to Danielle's every move. As such, he reveals that he committed suicide just to be with her forever and briefly morphs into the devil, much to her and Tiffany's chagrin and horror.

== Cast ==
- Julie Benz as Danielle
- Monica Keena as Brooke
- Nicole Bilderback as Tiffany
- Jonathan Brandis as Drew
- Aaron Paul as Jonathan Wharton
- Suzanna Urszuly as Katarina
- Chris D'Elia as Gavin
- Janet Leigh as Edwina Witt
- Christopher Lloyd as Mr. Chauncey

== Production ==
The movie was filmed from March to May 2000 and shelved for years. Originally titled A Fate Totally Worse than Death, the screenplay was based on the novel of the same name. The film was shot on location in Vancouver, British Columbia. Several scenes were filmed at the Cleveland Dam.

== Development and production ==
The film is an adaptation of Paul Fleischman's 1995 young adult novel "A Fate Totally Worse Than Death". Andrew Lane penned the initial adaptation for the screen, followed by subsequent rewrites from the team of Jason Friedberg & Aaron Seltzer. Screenwriter Larry Block, having read the novel independently, later approached producers Sid, Jon, and Bill Sheinberg of The Bubble Factory regarding the film rights. Block was subsequently hired to perform script revisions, which moved the project into active pre-production under director John Kretchmer. Following the film's completion, a Writers Guild of America credit arbitration resulted in Block not receiving final on-screen screenwriting credit, with final billing going to Lane and Robert LoCash.

== Reception ==
Daniel Kelly of DVD Talk said, "Really, the film isn't unwatchable, just don't expect anything intense or worthy of a second look (other than Janet Leigh's performance)."
