= Kevin Hawkes =

Kevin Hawkes may refer to:

- Kevin Hawkes (illustrator) on Weslandia and Marven of the Great North Woods
- Kevin Hawkes, character in Last Resort (U.S. TV series)
