= Janet Taylor Lisle =

American writer (1947–2023)

- Born: February 13, 1947; Englewood, New Jersey, U.S.
- Died: October 5, 2023 (aged 76); Boston, Massachusetts, U.S.
- Education: Ethel Walker School; Smith College; Georgia State University
- Occupation: Writer
- Spouse: Richard Lisle
- Children: 1
- Writing career
- Genres: Children's literature; young adult fiction
- Website: www.janettaylorlisle.com

Janet Taylor Lisle (February 13, 1947 – October 5, 2023) was an American author of children's books and young adult novels that range between fantasy and reality.

== Early years ==
Lisle was born on February 13, 1947, in Englewood, New Jersey. She grew up in rural Farmington, Connecticut, and spent her summers in Rhode Island. Growing up with four younger brothers, Lisle and the rest of her siblings were all passionate readers. She was educated at local schools until age fifteen when she entered the Ethel Walker School, a girl's boarding school in Simsbury, Connecticut.

== Higher education, career, and life ==
Lisle attended Smith College in Northampton, Massachusetts and graduated in 1969 with a degree in English. Following graduation, she married and joined VISTA (Volunteers in Service to America) in Atlanta, Georgia. In 1971, she returned to college at Georgia State University to take journalism classes. After an internship at The Atlanta Journal-Constitution, she worked as a reporter for local newspapers in the Atlanta area and later in Westchester County, New York.

With a new marriage and the birth of her daughter in 1977, Lisle changed her career path and began to write children's books at home. Her first book, The Dancing Cats of Applesap, was inspired by her own childhood memories. Following this book, she continued to write for a diverse audience and produced over seventeen children and young adult books, as well as several works of history for adults.

Lisle lived on the Rhode Island coast with her husband, Richard Lisle. She died in Boston, Massachusetts, on October 5, 2023, at the age of 76.

== Works ==
- The Dancing Cats of Applesap, illustrated by Joelle Shefts, Bradbury Press (Scarsdale, NY), 1984.
- Sirens and Spies, Bradbury Press (Scarsdale, NY), 1985.
- The Great Dimpole Oak, illustrated by Stephen Gammell, Orchard Books (New York, NY), 1987.
- Afternoon of the Elves, Orchard Books (New York, NY), 1989.
- The Lampfish of Twill, illustrated by Wendy Anderson Halperin, Orchard Books (New York, NY), 1991.
- Forest, Orchard Books (New York, NY), 1993.
- The Gold Dust Letters, Orchard Books (New York, NY), 1994.
- Looking for Juliette, Orchard Books (New York, NY), 1994.
- A Message from the Match Girl, Orchard Books (New York, NY), 1995.
- Angela's Aliens, Orchard Books (New York, NY), 1996.
- The Lost Flower Children, Philomel Books (New York, NY), 1999.
- The Art of Keeping Cool, Atheneum (New York, NY), 2000.
- How I Became a Writer and Oggie Learned to Drive, Philomel Books (New York, NY), 2002.
- The Crying Rocks, Atheneum (New York, NY), 2003
- Black Duck, Penguin Group (New York, NY), 2007
- Highway Cats, Penguin Group (New York, NY), 2008
- Quicksand Pond, Atheneum Books for Young Readers (May 16, 2017)

== Selected awards ==
- 1990 Newbery Honor Book - Afternoon of the Elves
- 2001 Scott O'Dell Award for Historical Fiction - The Art of Keeping Cool
