= Song of the Trees =

1975 novel by Mildred D. Taylor

- First edition
- Author: Mildred D. Taylor
- Illustrator: Jerry Pinkney
- Language: English
- Genre: Children's literature, historical fiction
- Publisher: Dial Press
- Publication date: 1975
- Publication place: United States
- Pages: 48
- ISBN: 9780553275872
- OCLC: 83446854
- Followed by: Roll of Thunder, Hear My Cry

Song of the Trees is a 1975 story by author Mildred Taylor and illustrator Jerry Pinkney. It was the first of her highly acclaimed series of books about the Logan family. The novella follows the time Mr. Anderson tried to cut down the trees on the Logan family's land. The story revolves around Cassie Logan who tries to save the trees on her Big Ma's land. Even though Cassie's family needed some money, something told Cassie the trees were just as valuable.

Song of the Trees is followed by four sequels: Roll of Thunder, Hear My Cry (1976), Let the Circle Be Unbroken (1981), The Road to Memphis (1990), All the Days Past, All the Days to Come (2020), and a prequel, The Land (2001).

== Characters ==
=== The Logan family ===
The Logan family consists of David (Papa), Mary (Mama), Caroline (Big Ma, David's mother and the children's grandmother), and Paul-Edward (Big Ma's husband and David's father). Their children are Stacey, Cassie, Christopher-John, and Clayton Chester ("Little Man").

=== The lumbermen ===
Mr. Anderson, Tom (Mr. Andersen's partner), and the lumbermen. They make a deal with the Logan family to cut down their trees at first, but are later stopped by David (Papa of the Logan family).

== Awards ==
Song of the Trees won the Coretta Scott King Author Honor Award 1976.
