= Carolyn Reeder =

American writer (1937-2012)

Carolyn Reeder (November 16, 1937 – January 20, 2012) was an American writer best known for children's historical novels. She also wrote three non-fiction books about Shenandoah National Park for adults together with her husband. She won the Scott O'Dell Award for Historical Fiction. During the last year of her life she wrote a column for children in The Washington Post (KidsPost) about Civil War history.

Carolyn Bruce Owens was born in Washington, D.C. She studied organ and voice at American University where she graduated in 1959 with a degree in music. She lived in Glen Echo, Maryland. She was afflicted by kidney cancer and died in a Washington hospital.

== Works ==
- Shades of Grey (1989). Shades of Gray. Simon and Schuster. 1999. ISBN 978-0-689-82696-2.
- Moonshiner's Son. HarperCollins Children's Books. 1995. ISBN 978-0-380-72251-8.
- Foster's War. Scholastic Inc. 2000. ISBN 978-0-590-09856-4.
- Across the Lines. HarperCollins. 1998. ISBN 978-0-380-73073-5.
- Grandpa's Mountain. Turtleback Books. 1993. ISBN 978-0-7857-0623-6.
- Captain Kate, Avon Books, 1999, ISBN 978-0-380-97628-7
- Before the Creeks Ran Red, HarperCollins, 2003, ISBN 978-0-06-623616-2
- The Secret Project Notebook, Los Alamos Historical Society, 2005, ISBN 0-941232-33-6

Non-fiction

- Shenandoah Heritage,
- Shenandoah Vestiges,
- Shenandoah Secrets, Potomac Appalachian Trail Club, 1991
