= Jip, His Story =

1996 children's book by Katherine Paterson

- First edition
- Author: Katherine Paterson
- Language: English
- Genre: Children's Historical novel
- Publisher: Dutton Juvenile
- Publication date: October 24, 1996
- Publication place: United States
- Media type: Print (Hardcover)
- Pages: 192 pp (hardcover edition)
- ISBN: 978-0-575-06399-0 (hardback edition)
- OCLC: 36122563

Jip, His Story is a 1996 children's book written by American novelist Katherine Paterson. Set in Vermont during the 1850s, it focuses on a 12-year-old orphan named Jip, who was abandoned as an infant and mistaken for a gypsy because of his skin color. Jip works at a poor farm where mentally ill residents are housed. Jip discovers that he is the part-black child of an escaped slave, and that he has been claimed as the property of a slave-owning farmer.

Jip, His Story, won the 1997 Scott O'Dell Award for Historical Fiction. In 2005, the book was turned into a musical by Danny Duncan and Emily Klion and performed at The Marsh. This adaptation won the 2008 American Harmony Prize.
