= Mercenaries (2014 film) =

- Directed by: Christopher Ray
- Written by: Edward DeRuiter
- Produced by: David Michael Latt; David Rimawi; Paul Bales
- Starring: Kristanna Loken; Brigitte Nielsen; Vivica A. Fox; Zoë Bell; Cynthia Rothrock
- Cinematography: Alexander Yellin
- Edited by: Maureen Murphy; Bobby K. Richardson
- Music by: Chris Ridenhour
- Distributed by: The Asylum
- Release date: August 5, 2014
- Running time: 90 minutes
- Country: United States
- Language: English

Mercenaries (also known as The Female Expendables) is a 2014 American action thriller film directed by Christopher Ray. The film stars Kristanna Loken, Brigitte Nielsen, Vivica A. Fox, with Zoë Bell, Nicole Bilderback, and Cynthia Rothrock.

== Plot ==
During a visit to Kazakhstan, the daughter of the U.S. President is captured and held for ransom by Ulrika, a female warlord. The CIA tasks agent Mona Kendall to create a team to rescue the first daughter from Ulrika's base, a former Soviet prison nicknamed "The Citadel". The team Kendall puts together were all serving time in U.S. prisons, but are offered full pardons for taking part in the operation.

With the help of a local girl, the four-woman team gains access to The Citadel, but just as they are about to escape after rescuing the first daughter, one of their number turns against them.

== Cast ==
- Brigitte Nielsen as Ulrika, A Ruthless Female Kazakh Warlord.
- Kristanna Loken as Kat Morgan, Ex-Marine Corps Scout Sniper
- Vivica A. Fox as Donna "Raven" Ravena, Former CIA Operative
- Zoë Bell as Cassandra Clay, Ex-Delta Force Soldier
- Cynthia Rothrock as CIA Agent Mona Kendall
- Nicole Bilderback as Mei-Lin Fong, Explosives Expert & Pilot
- Tim Abell as Grigori Babishkov, Ulrika's Second-In-Command.
- Tiffany Panhilason as Elise, Daughter of The U.S. President
- Gerald Webb as Bobby
- Alexis Raich as Lexi
- Damion Poitier as Webber
- Morgan Benoit as Stefan
- Bernard Babish as Pavel
- Dmitri S. Boudrine as Luko
- Kevin Fry as Jerrod
- Antonio Cullari as Pigmatelli
- Zedric Harris as Max
- Jenna Stone as Rebekah
- Alicia Vigil as Kristina
- Scott Thomas Reynolds as CIA Agent Reynolds
- Alyma Dorsey as "Tuffy"
- Nick Gracer as "Toad"
- Edward DeRuiter as "Vez"
- Emily Lopato as Prostitute
- Adam Dorsey as Guard
- Nickolai Stoilov as Ozgur
- Bill Voorhees as Kierk
- Eric D'Agostino as John
- Carl Ciarfalio as Driver

== Casting ==
Cynthia Rothrock recalled in an interview that she was originally to have played the Brigitte Nielsen role, but another appointment led her to miss the start of filming. The role she was later offered was to have been originally played by Rebecca DeMornay.

== Reviews ==
Mercenaries received overwhelmingly negative reviews from critics, with its dialogue and production values being criticized the most.
