= Nikolay Stoilov =

American actor

- Николай Стоилов
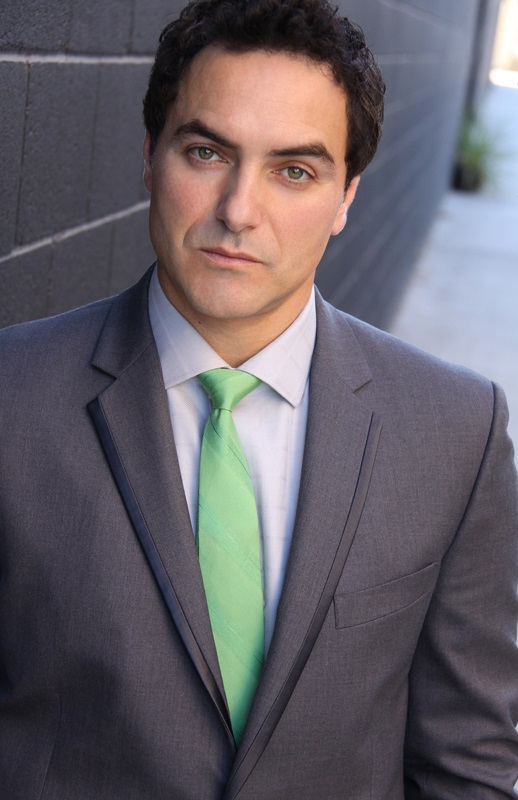
- Born: 2 June 1968 (age 58); Sofia, Bulgaria
- Citizenship: American, Bulgarian
- Education: Master of Arts in Acting
- Alma mater: Krastyo Sarafov National Academy for Theatre and Film Arts
- Occupation: actor
- Years active: 1992 – present
- Agent: DPN Talent
- Notable work: Despicable Me 2, Lana's Rain
- Awards: Timmy Award (2005)
- Website: nickolaistoilov.com

Nikolay Stoilov (Bulgarian: Николай Стоилов) is a Bulgarian-American film and stage actor, and writer.

He is best known for his performance as Darco Lucev in the American film Lana's Rain (2002), as well as his roles in NCIS: Los Angeles, Alias, and voice in Despicable Me 2. He is also skiing competitively in the Far West Masters League.

== Biography and career ==
Nikolay Stoilov graduated from the First English Language School in Sofia in 1987.

He served for two years in the Bulgarian military as a parachutist.

Stoilov received his Master of Arts degree in acting from the Bulgarian Academy for Theater and Film Arts in Sofia in 1992 (graduating one year earlier!), and then continued to study at the Guildford School of Acting until 1994. He also graduated in the Advanced Acting Program of the British American Drama Academy at Stanford University.

American film critic Roger Ebert describes Stoilov in his role of Darko in Lana's Rain as

" ... a low-life Scarface, with a stable of hookers, a big cigar, and a bottle and gun under his coat ...

On the basis of his work as the brother, Nikolay Stoilov has a future as a Bond villain."

Nikolay Stoilov has also co-written and published a book, The Ph.D. Horror Story.

Stoilov speaks Bulgarian, English, French and Russian, and plays piano and accordion. He is married, with one child.

== Filmography ==
=== Film ===
- Vampires, Goblins (in Bulgarian) - 1992
- Sabrina the Teenage Witch (1996)
- Lana's Rain - 2002
- Alias - 2005
- El Padrino 2 - 2008
- General Hospital (TV series) - 2010
- NCIS: Los Angeles (TV series) - 2011
- Mercenaries - 2014

=== Theater ===
- The Idiot by Fyodor Dostoevsky - Kniaz Mishkin
- The Resurrection by W. B. Yeats - The Syrian
- Hamlet by William Shakespeare - Hamlet

=== Voice Over ===
- Despicable Me 2 (voice) - 2013

=== Video games ===
- Medal of Honor: European Assault (voice) - 2005
- Call of Duty: Black Ops (voice) - 2010
- Call of Duty: Modern Warfare 3 (voice) - 2011
- Ace Combat: Assault Horizon (voice) - 2011
- Tom Clancy's Ghost Recon: Future Soldier (voice) - 2012
- Battlefield 4 (voice) - 2013
- Call of Duty: Modern Warfare (voice) - 2019

=== Commercials ===
- Strepsils (Europe)
- BBB - Juice (Europe)
