= The Honorable Prison =

Young adult novel

- First edition
- Author: Lyll Becerra de Jenkins
- Language: English
- Genre: Young adult novel
- Published: 1988 (Dutton)
- Publication place: USA
- Media type: Print (hardback)
- Pages: 199
- ISBN: 9780525672388
- OCLC: 16831389

The Honorable Prison is a 1988 young adult novel by Lyll Becerra de Jenkins. Based on de Jenkins' life, it tells the story of a young girl named Marta and her family who are placed under house arrest due to her newspaper editor father's criticism of a Latin American government. It won the 1989 Scott O'Dell Award for Historical Fiction.

== Reception ==
The Honorable Prison has been compared to The Diary of a Young Girl.

Kirkus Reviews wrote "Not just another child-in-war novel, this first novel strikes a particularly contemporary note in its unsentimental portrayal of the abuses of power and of a family's attempt to remain intact in adversity.", and Publishers Weekly called it "An eloquent first novel.".

The Honorable Prison has also been reviewed by The New York Times, School Library Journal, and The Horn Book Magazine.

It is a 1988 CCBC Choices book, and won the 1989 Scott O'Dell Award for Historical Fiction.
