= The Land (Taylor novel) =

2001 novel by Mildred D. Taylor

- Author: Mildred D. Taylor
- Language: English
- Series: Logan Family saga #6
- Genre: Historical fiction Children's literature
- Publisher: Scholastic
- Publication date: 2001
- Publication place: United States
- Media type: Print
- Pages: 375 pp.
- Awards: 2002 Coretta Scott King Award
- ISBN: 9780803719507
- OCLC: 44469121
- LC Class: PZ7.T21723 Lan 2001
- Preceded by: The Road to Memphis
- Followed by: All the Days Past, All the Days to Come

The Land is a novel written by American author Mildred D. Taylor and published in 2001 by Scholastic. It is the sixth and penultimate book of the Logan Family saga that began with Song of the Trees (1975). It is a prequel to the whole series, recounting the life of Cassie Logan's grandfather, Paul-Edward, as he grows from a nine-year-old boy into a man in his mid-twenties. The novel was well-received and won the 2002 Coretta Scott King Award and the 2002 Scott O'Dell Award for Historical Fiction.

This was originally the final book in the series before the release of All the Days Past, All the Days to Come, in 2020, which continues the story of the Logan family chronologically from the last book, The Road to Memphis, set twenty years later.

== Synopsis ==
The Land follows the life of Paul-Edward Logan. Paul is the child of a white man and a woman with Black and Native American ancestry. Paul has three entries from Paul's journal, after the main story ends. The dialogue uses the Southern dialect from the 1870s and 1880s.

=== Childhood ===
The novel begins with Paul-Edward, as a nine-year-old. It describes how Paul's life has been different from that of most freed slaves. The book is narrated from Paul's perspective, and quickly introduces his three brothers, his sister, and Mitchell Thomas, a black boy whose father works for Paul's father and who becomes a vital member of the story-line. In the beginning, Mitchell continually bullies Paul for being multiracial. Paul's father and brothers' only advice for Paul is to "use his head," and come up with a solution by himself. In "Childhood," Paul's parents are constant reminders of the trials of being born biracial. After several months of incessant bullying, Paul strikes a deal with Mitchell. Their deal states that if Paul teaches Mitchell to "read English, write English, and figure," then Mitchell will teach Paul how to fight and to fend for himself; but as he reminded Paul, Mitchell "can't teach him how to win."

Paul and Mitchell soon grow tired of obeying Edward Logan (Paul's Father). Paul comes across the opportunity to race another man's horse. Edward Logan forbids it, saying that it would be unwise of Paul to ride, let alone race, a horse with whom he is not acquainted. Paul wins the race but has trouble collecting his pay. The owner of the horse will not give Paul his pay. Due to Paul being of mixed heritage, the owner of the horse doesn't even have to give Paul his earned money. If Mitchell hadn't used violent force to ensure that the white man kept his word by paying Paul his money, Paul would have never seen any dime of "four times a rider's pay." After this incident, the two flee aboard a train with the help of a white woman.

=== Manhood ===
Paul and Mitchell are working in a lumber camp and wish to escape. The pair start their journey together, but they decide to separate to avoid drawing attention to themselves. While they are separated, Mitchell goes to more lumber camps, and Paul's eyes land upon J. T. Hollenbeck's land. Upon seeing this land, Paul knows that this is "The Land". His land. The book then goes on to describe life in different types of work camps. The story follows Paul as he works at a general store owned by Luke Sawyer, and as a woodworker in a small town called Vicksburg.

Eventually, Paul and Mitchell meet a man by the name of Filmore Granger and make a deal to work for the possession of 40 acres. Although it is not The Land, clearing the forty will help Paul obtain the money needed for J. T. Hollenbeck's land. A deal was struck between Paul and Mr. Granger that stated, if Paul could clear the forty within about two years, Paul and Mitchell would own the forty.

After a few months of working hard at the forty, Paul realizes that he needs the help of some hired hands. Mitchell suggests Tom Bee, with whom he had worked a lumber camp. A white boy Paul had met before, and a young black boy named Nathan Perry, who later becomes Paul's brother-in-law are also hired hands. For a while, a white boy by the name of Wade Jamison helps Paul clear the forty.

Mitchell marries Caroline, who soon becomes pregnant, while Paul continues to work for his land. To disrupt this happiness, Digger Wallace fulfills his promise to get Mitchell back for embarrassing him. One day while Mitchell is working on Filmore Granger's land, the drunken Digger shoots Mitchell from behind. Mitchell was in the middle of felling a tree when shot. Being paralyzed with searing pain, Mitchell is crushed by the tree. When Paul gets back from The Land, he arrives on the scene; Mitchell is almost dead. Mitchell's last request of Paul is that he marry Caroline and take care of their unborn child. After Mitchell dies, Paul tries to hunt down Digger, but is unsuccessful. Later, Digger is found dead, face down in a river, with a bottle of moonshine floating next to him.

Later that year, their work of clearing the forty is almost completed and should soon be in Paul's possession, even with all of the extra conditions that Granger adds to the deal in a last-ditch attempt to keep his land. When Granger claims that they cut trees outside of the perimeter, he declares that he wants Paul off of the land; unless he wishes to sharecrop. Cassie, Paul's sister, sends their brother Robert up to deliver an envelope with the money he needs to purchase J. T. Hollenbeck's land. His brother tells Paul of the family's condition and gives Paul the envelope. Enclosed is the money and two letters. Paul's sister explains in her letter that their mother owned the patch of land that they lived on as children, and that ten years after their mother's death, she sold the land to their father for $500, much more than it was worth. This combined with his sister's savings made more than enough money to pay for the land. After burying Mitchell's body, Paul asks Caroline to marry him, and confessing that she too, loves him, Caroline says yes. From this point in the story, Paul purchases the land, moves onto it, and lives the life he wants.

=== Legacy ===
In Legacy, Paul's father was sick when Paul takes his boys back to see his family. He saw Robert, Hammond, Cassie, and Cassie's husband Howard. Though Paul had visited Hammond in his store several times over the years, Paul had never heard from brothers Robert and George. No one had heard from George in years. The day after Paul arrived home, his father died. Paul then bought the other 200 acres of Hollenbeck land, from Wade Jamison.

== Characters ==
- Paul-Edward Logan: Multi-racial, son of a white landowner, is the main character and narrator of the story.
- Deborah Logan (Mom): The mother of Cassie and Paul. Also the love of Edward's life.
- Mitchell: Paul's best friend. He is a son of one of the workers on Paul's father's farm. As a child, Mitchell hates Paul and his privileged life.
- Edward Logan (Dad): The father of Paul, Cassie, George, Hammond, and Robert. Paul and Cassie are one-quarter black because Edward had an affair with a slave he owned who was half black and half Native American.
- Cassie Logan Millhouse: Paul's older sister. Cassie moves and marries a man named Howard Millhouse. She helps Paul to cope with being multiracial.
- Robert Logan: Youngest of Paul's brothers. Since they are about the same age, they spend their whole childhood playing together and learning from each other. Once Robert goes against Paul their relationship falls apart.
- George Logan: Paul's second oldest white brother. He doesn't have any racial bias towards Paul. He seems passionate and quick-tempered.
- Hammond Logan: Paul's eldest white brother. He doesn't have any racial bias towards Paul. He seems to be smart and gentle. He also stands up for his brother and appears at the end of the book to meet Paul.
- Luke Sawyer: A shop owner. Paul builds furniture for him and, in return, learns many things.
- Caroline Perry: A spirited, capable, hardworking, beautiful black woman with deeply held principles whom both Paul and Mitchell are attracted to.
- Tom Bee: A black man. John Wallace follows him, he helps on the 40.
- Digger Wallace: A white man. Coward, always drunk. Jealous of Paul's Thunder and killed Mitchell and Thunder while Paul went to Strawberry to bank loan. Fled with his brother after killing them.
- John Wallace: A white man. Digger's brother, follows Tom Bee, fled with Digger to Alabama after Digger killed Mitchell and Thunder.
- J. T. Hollenbeck: A white landowner who is willing to sell land to Paul for a reasonable price, he is a Yankee.
- Ray Sutcliffe: A racist man who use Paul to win a horse race but refuses to give money promised.
- Sam Perry: The father of Caroline. He is a father type figure to Paul.
- Filmore Granger: A racist landowner who makes a written agreement with Paul to give him 40 acres (160,000 m^{2}) but after making a series of difficult conditions, he finally trumps up a false reason refuse to do so when the land is cleared, knowing that Paul as a "man of color" has no legal recourse against a white man.
- Harlan Granger: The racist son of Filmore Granger.
- Wade Jamison: The son of Charles Jamison who is white and a friend of Nathan. Wade is willing to help Paul get the 40 acres (160,000 m^{2}) from Filmore Granger.
- Rachel Perry: Caroline and Nathan's mother and Sam's wife. Rachel is a devout Christian woman who has raised her family in her faith. Rachel is an excellent cook and homemaker who is devoted to her husband and family. She does not like Paul at first because he looks white, but comes to recognize his exceptional character.
- Nathan Perry: Caroline's younger brother. His father, Sam Perry, brings Nathan to apprentice as a woodworker with Paul and help him log and clear "The Forty" 40 acres (160,000 m^{2}) of land. Nathan idolizes Mitchell and Paul.

== Autobiographical elements ==
Mildred D. Taylor's novels are often based on stories that she read, heard, or was told about her family's history. "I remember my grandparents' house, the house my great-grandfather had built at the turn of the century, and I remember the adults talking about the past. As they talked, I began to visualize all the family who had once known The Land and I felt as if I knew them too," Taylor explained.

== Works cited ==
- Taylor, Mildred (2001). The Land. New York: Penguin. ISBN 9780803719507.
