= Meshack Asare =

Ghanaian writer (born 1945)

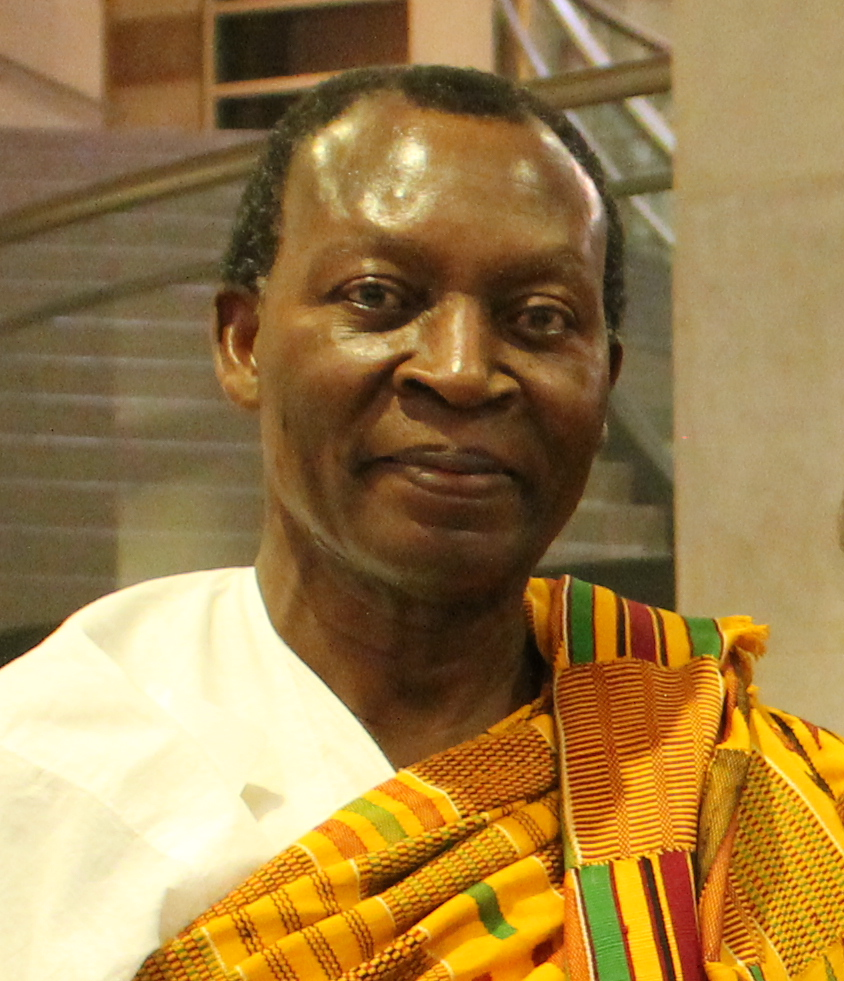
Asare at Neustadt banquet in 2015

Meshack Asare (born 1945) is a popular African children's author. He was born in Ghana and currently resides in Degenfeld, Germany. On 15 July 2014, he was announced as a finalist for the prestigious international award, the 2015 NSK Neustadt Prize for Children's Literature, which he won on 24 October 2014, becoming the first African to receive the award. The Brassman's Secret was his representative text read by the nominating jury, and the award honors his entire body of work.

== Life ==
Meshack Asare was born on 18 September 1945 in Nyankumasi, Ghana. His mother Agatha Adoma Afram was a trader and his father Joseph K. Asare was an accountant. Asare was the second of six children. Asare studied Fine Arts at the College of Art in Kumasi, and between 1967 and 1979 he was a teacher in Ghana. During this time he began to write and illustrate children's books, including the much translated Tawia Goes to Sea, which received the Ghana National Book Award and the UNESCO citation "Best picture book from Africa".

After a period of ten years during which he did not publish any work, Asare returned in 1981 with a new book, The Brassman's Secret, which was translated into many languages, and won the Noma Award in 1982 as the best book published in Africa in the preceding year. Many further successes followed. In 1984, Asare's Cat in Search of a Friend won the Austrian National Prize (1985) and a BIB Golden Plaque at the Bratislava Biennale (1995).

Asare studied for an M.A. degree in Social Anthropology at the University of London's School of Oriental and African Studies, and since 1993 he was based in London, while frequently travelling throughout to Africa, looking to experience as many African cultures as possible so as to represent them in his works. His book Sosu's Call was the winner of the 1999 UNESCO First Prize for Children's and Young People's Literature in the Service of Tolerance.

== A book which Meshack Asare has. ==
- He also made the book called CHILDREN OF THE TREE.
- First published in Ghana in 2000 by SUB-SAHARAN PUBLISHERS.
- It is a Biblionef book.

== Selected bibliography ==
=== Children's literature ===
- Noma's Sand: A Tale from Lesotho (Sub-Saharan Publishers, 2002)
- Meliga's Day (Sub-Saharan Publishers, 2000)
- Nana's Son (Sub-Saharan Publishers, 2000)
- Sosu's Call (Sub-Saharan Publishers, 1997)
- The Magic Goat (Sub-Saharan Publishers, 1997)
- Halima (Macmillan, 1992)
- Cat in Search of a Friend (Austria: Jungbrunnen, 1984)
- Chipo and the Bird on the Hill: A tale of ancient Zimbabwe (Zimbabwe Publishing House, 1984)
- The Brassman's Secret (Education Press, 1981)
- Tawia Goes to Sea (Ghana Publishers, 1970)
- Mansa Helps at Home (Ghana Publishers, 1969)
- I Am Kofi (Ghana Publishers, 1968)

=== Short stories ===
- Bury My Bones but Keep My Words: African tales for retelling (HarperCollins, 1991)
