= Mind's Eye (novel) =

1999 dialogue format novel by Paul Fleischman

- First US edition (publ. St. Martin's Press)
- Author: Paul Fleischman
- Publisher: Henry Holt and Company
- Publication date: September 1, 1999
- ISBN: 0-8050-6314-5

Mind's Eye is a 1999 dialogue format novel written by American author Paul Fleischman. It was named an American Library Association's Best Books for Young Adults.

== Plot summary ==
The main character, Courtney, is a very unlucky girl. Her father walked out on her mom and her when she was little. Adding to that, her mom remarried a real jerk. To make matters worse, her mom died leaving Courtney alone with her stepfather. To put the icing on the cake, a riding accident paralyzes her. Finally, to put the cherry on the icing, she is sent to a nursing home. There she meets an old lady named Elva, and another named May, who has Alzheimer's. She repeats what she says three times. For Example: "I think my dance dance dance lessons were cancelled". Elva made a promise to go to Italy to her husband before he died, and since she is too weak to go, she is backed into a corner. She had to take an imaginary trip. She procrastinated and now is unable to do it on her own since she cannot use her eyes to see the maps of Italy. But now, Courtney can help her. They go on a mind's eye trip and finish it. In the end, Elva passes away.
