= NSK Neustadt Prize for Children's Literature =

NSK Prize
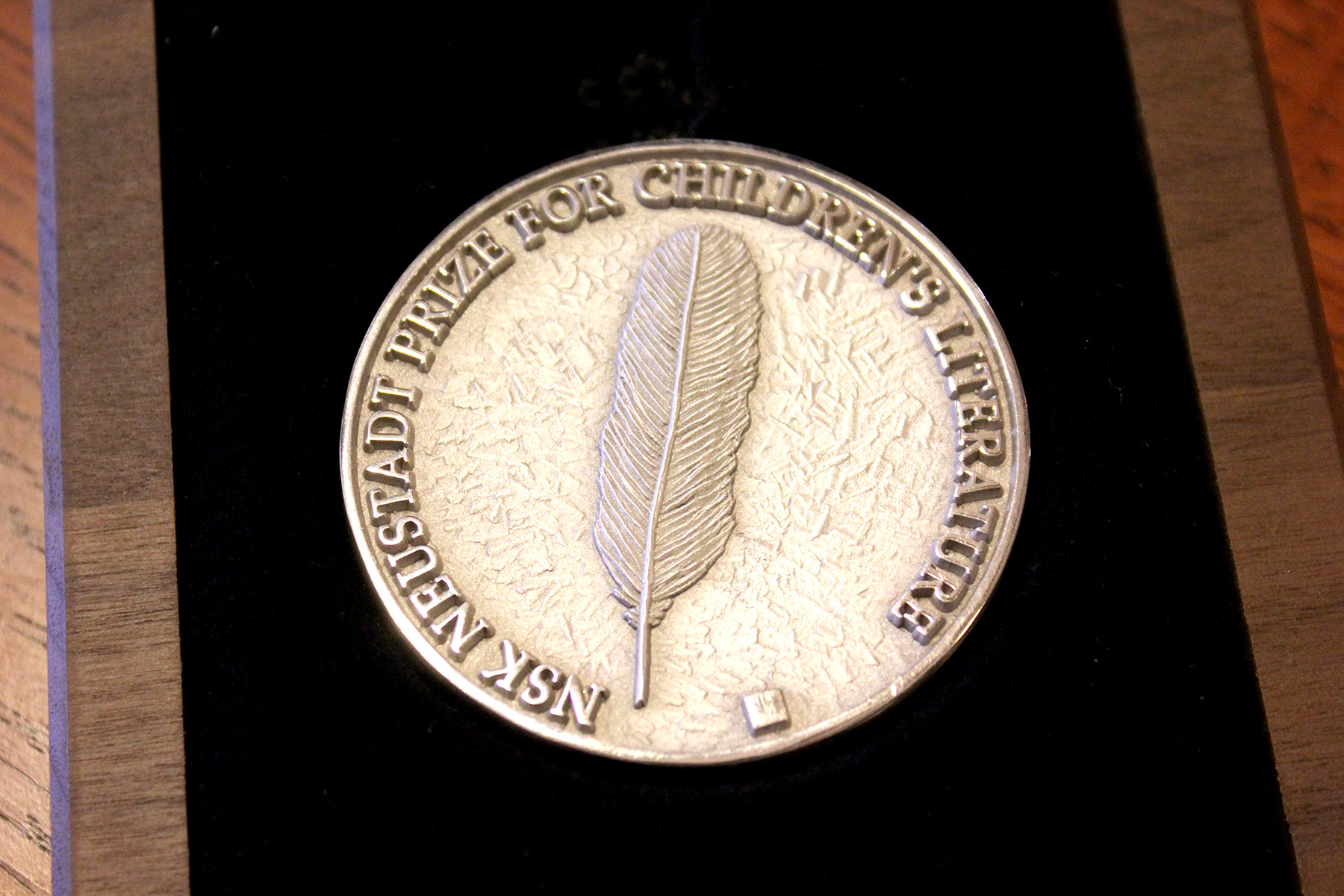
- NSK Prize silver medallion
- Country: United States
- Presented by: World Literature Today and the University of Oklahoma
- First award: 2003; 23 years ago
- Website: neustadtprize.org/the-nsk-prize

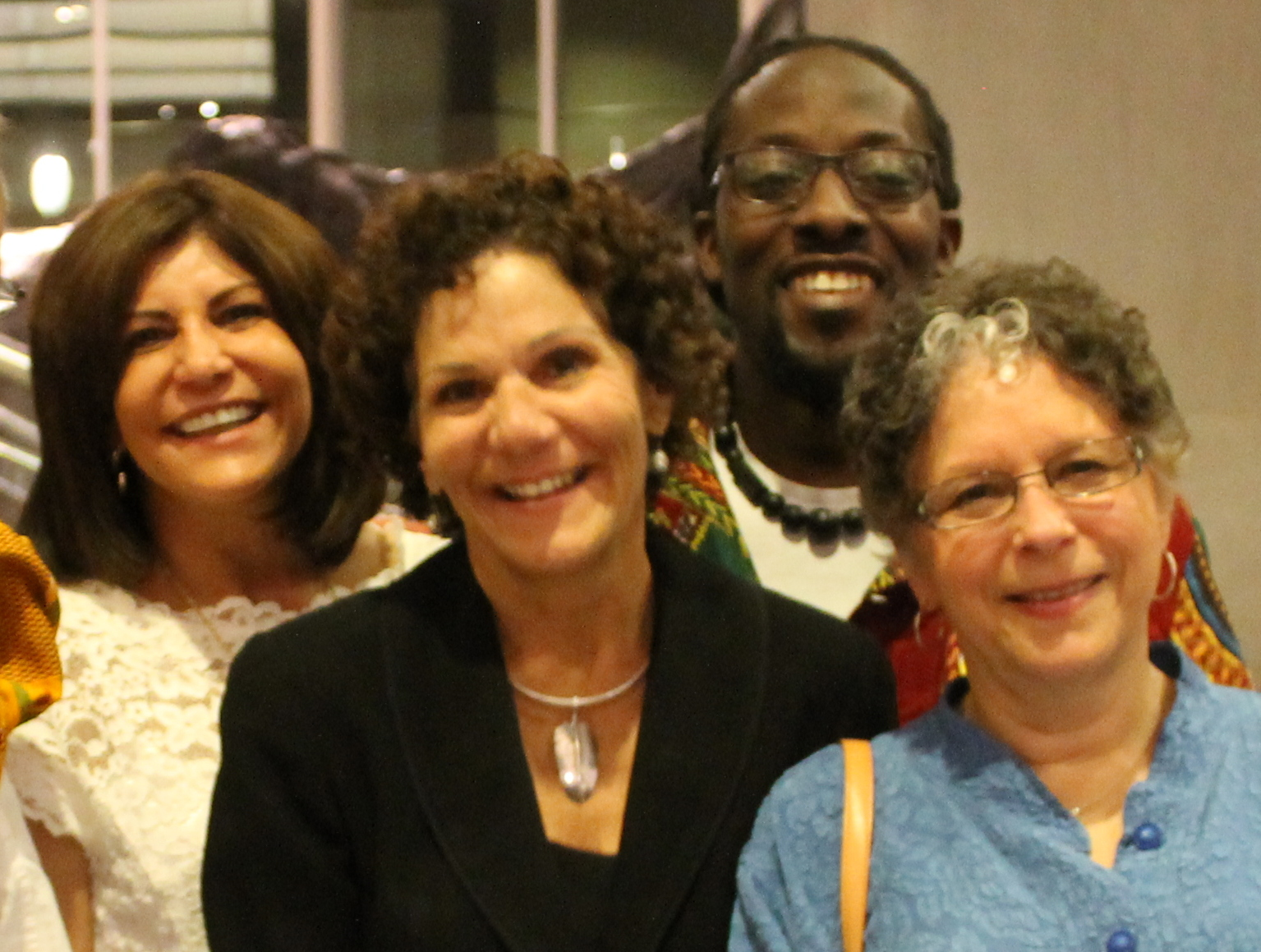
(From left to right) Susan Neustadt Schwartz, Kathy Neustadt, author Nii Parkes, and Nancy Barcelo in 2015. The first initials of sisters Nancy, Susan, and Kathy make up the NSK of the prize name.

The NSK Neustadt Prize for Children's Literature is an international children's literary award founded in 2003 and given every odd-number year by World Literature Today. The prize is an offshoot of the Neustadt International Prize for Literature. Nancy Barcelo, Kathy Neustadt, and Susan Neustadt Schwartz, the daughters of Walter Jr. and Dolores Neustadt and the granddaughters of Walter Sr. and Doris Westheimer Neustadt, established the prize to “enhance the quality of children's literature by recognizing writing that contributes to the quality of children's lives.”

It is one of few children's literature awards that is awarded for an author's entire body of work—the main criterion is the positive impact of a writer's work on the quality of children's literature and only living writers are eligible. To distinguish the prize from others such as the Newbery, Caldecott, and Hans Christian Andersen awards, the Neustadts decided there would be no limitations concerning age-range, genre, or media of the children's literature under consideration.

Candidates for the award are nominated by a jury of children's literature writers, illustrators, and scholars, and the jury also selects the winner. The winner receives a check for $35,000, a silver medallion, and a certificate, in a public ceremony at the University of Oklahoma.

== Winners ==
To date, the winners of the NSK Neustadt Prize for Children's Literature include:

Year	Name	Country
2003	Mildred D. Taylor	United States
2005	Brian Doyle	Canada
2007	Katherine Paterson	United States
2009	Vera B. Williams	United States
2011	Virginia Euwer Wolff	United States
2013	Naomi Shihab Nye	United States
2015	Meshack Asare	Ghana
2017	Marilyn Nelson	United States
2019	Margarita Engle	United States
2021	Cynthia Leitich Smith	United States
2023	Gene Luen Yang	United States
2025	Cherie Dimaline	Canada
