= The Art of Keeping Cool =

2000 novel by Janet Taylor Lisle

- Author: Janet Taylor Lisle
- Language: English
- Subject: World War II
- Genre: Children's Literature; Historical Fiction
- Set in: Sachem's Head, RI in 1942
- Publisher: Atheneum Books for Young Readers
- Publication date: October 2000
- Publication place: United States
- Pages: 207
- Awards: Scott O'Dell Award for Historical Fiction, winner, Riverbank Review Book of Distinction, winner, 2001; ALA Notable Children's Book; Horn Book Fanfare; Junior Library Guild Selection; Scholastic Book Club Selection

The Art of Keeping Cool is a children's historical novel by Janet Taylor Lisle published in October 2000 by Anthem Books.

== Background ==
Author Janet Taylor Lisle drew from three sources of inspiration when writing The Art of Keeping Cool. Her fascination with her father's service as a bomber pilot in the Royal Air Force, the U.S. army occupation of her hometown during World War II, and the far-reaching cultural impact of the Nazi regime.

== Summary ==
The Art of Keeping Cool deals with the difficulties of childhood during World War II. in 1942, making sense of his family is especially difficult for thirteen-year-old Robert, whose father has been deployed in Europe with the Royal Canadian Air Force for more than six months. After Pearl Harbor, Robert and his family moved from their farm in Ohio to live with his father's parents in Rhode Island.

This living situation is strange to Robert, who has never met his grandparents or his cousin Elliot who also lives in Rhode Island. He finds it even more odd that neither his mother nor his extended family ever discuss his father. Robert must search to find reason for the unexplainable family dynamic. With the help of Elliot and an exiled German painter named Abel Hoffman, Robert uncovers with the dark history of his father's family.

After a little time, Elliot starts going to Abel Hoffman's house to sketch.

== Awards ==
- Scott O'Dell Award for Historical Fiction, winner, 2001
- Riverbank Review Book of Distinction, winner, 2001
- ALA Notable Children's Book
- Horn Book Fanfare
- Junior Library Guild Selection
- Scholastic Book Club Selection

== Notes ==
References:
