= John and Patricia Beatty =

American writers

John Beatty
- Born: John Louis Beatty; January 24, 1922; Portland, Oregon, U.S.
- Died: March 23, 1975 (aged 53); Riverside, California, U.S.
- Occupation: Historian
- Known for: Writing several books with his wife
- Spouse: Patricia Beatty

Patricia Beatty
- Born: August 26, 1922; Portland, Oregon, U.S.
- Died: July 9, 1991 (aged 68); California, U.S.
- Occupation: Children's librarian
- Known for: Writing several books with her husband
- Spouse: John Beatty (died 1975)

John Louis Beatty (January 24, 1922 – March 23, 1975) and Patricia Beatty (August 26, 1922 – July 9, 1991) were married American writers, an academic historian and a children's librarian. They wrote several books together until John Beatty's death in 1975, after which Patricia continued to write until her death in 1991. All Beatty titles have been returned to e-print through Beebliome Books.

== John Beatty ==
John Louis Beatty was born on January 24, 1922, in Portland, Oregon, and later became a history professor. He wrote ten books with his wife Patricia and helped edit a two-volume historical text entitled Heritage of Western Civilization. Beatty served as an assistant professor of history and humanities at the University of California, Riverside, and died on March 23, 1975, in Riverside, California.

== Patricia Beatty ==
Patricia Beatty was born August 26, 1922, in Portland, Oregon. She spent part of her life in the Pacific Northwest and occasionally resided on Indian reservations. Beatty graduated from Reed College in Portland and has worked as a children's librarian and a high school teacher. She has written fifty books, ten of which were with her first husband John Beatty. She remarried in 1975 to Carl Uhr, an economics professor at the University of California. She died on July 9, 1991.

== Awards and accolades ==
=== For Patricia Beatty ===
- 1972 Jane Addams Children's Book Award, nomination for Lupita Manana
- 1974 California Council Medal from the Southern California Council on Literature for Children and Young People, won
- 1976 California Council Medal from the Southern California Council on Literature for Children and Young People, won
- 1983 Literature Medal from the Southern California Council on Literature for Children and Young People for Jonathan down Under, won
- 1984 Western Writers of America Award, won
- 1987 Western Writers of America Award, won
- 1988 Scott O'Dell Award for Historical Fiction for Charley Skedaddle, won

=== For both Beattys ===
- 1963 New York Times One Hundred Outstanding Books for Young People for At the Seven Stars
- 1965 Commonwealth Club of California Medal for best juvenile by a California author for Campion Towers
- 1966 Horn Book honor list for A Donkey for the King
- 1967 Southern California Council on Children's and Young People's Literature Medal for The Young Dirk

== Bibliography ==
=== By both Beattys ===
- At the Seven Stars (1963)
- Squaw Dog (1965)
- Campion Towers (1965)
- A Donkey for the King (1966)
- The Royal Dirk (1966)
- The Queen's Wizard (1967)
- Witch Dog (1968)
- Pirate Royal (1969)
- Holdfast (1972)
- Master Rosalind (1974)
- Who Comes to King's Mountain? (1975)

=== John Beatty alone ===
- Warwick and Holland, Being the Lives of Robert and Henry Rich (1965)
- Heritage of Western Civilization Volumes I and II (1982)

=== Patricia Beatty alone ===
- Bonanza Girl (1962)
- The Nickel-Plated Beauty (1964)
- Eight Mules from Monterey (1966)
- The Queen's Own Grove (1966)
- The Sea Pair (1970)
- Hail, Columbia (1970)
- O the Red Rose Tree (1972)
- Red Rock over the River (1973)
- The Bad Bell of San Salvador (1973)
- How Many Miles to Sundown? (1974)
- Rufus, Red Rufus (1975)
- By Crumbs, It's Mine (1976)
- Something to Shout About (1976)
- Billy Bedamned, Long Gone By (1977)
- I Want My Sunday, Stranger (1977)
- Just Some Weeds from the Wilderness (1978)
- Lacy Makes a Match (1979)
- The Staffordshire Terror (1979)
- That's One Ornery Orphan (1980)
- Lupita Manana (1981)
- Jonathan Down Under (1982)
- Melinda Takes a Hand (1983)
- The Coach That Never Came (1985)
- Behave Yourself Bethany Brant (1986)
- Charley Skedaddle (1987)
- Be Ever Hopeful, Hannalee (1988)
- Eben Tyne, Powder Monkey (1990)
- Wait for Me, Watch for Me, Eula Bee (1978)
- Who Comes with Cannons? (1990)
- Jayhawker (1991)
- Turn Homeward, Hannalee (1991)
- Sarah and Me and the Lady from the Sea (1994)

== John and Patricia Beatty Award ==
The California Library Association's (CLA) John and Patricia Beatty Award honors authors and/or illustrators of distinguished books for children and/or young adults that best promote an awareness of California and its people. Patricia Beatty donated the initial endowment, which now honors both her and her husband. A committee of CLA members selects the winning title from books published in the United States during the preceding year. The award was established in 1990. In October 2021, the CLA Board of Directors voted unanimously to allow the Beatty Committee to select an additional award for young adults. Each award winner is granted $500. The 2023 award winners were Wake, Sleepy One: California Poppies and the Super Bloom, written by Lisa Kerr and illustrated by Lisa Powell Braun, published by West Margin Press, an imprint of Turner Publishing Company; and The Peach Rebellion, written by Wendelin Van Draanen and published by Random House Children's Books, a division of the Penguin Group.
