= Afternoon of the Elves =

1989 adolescent novel by Janet Taylor Lisle

- First edition
- Author: Janet Taylor Lisle
- Language: English
- Genre: novel
- Publisher: Orchard Books
- Publication date: 1989
- Publication place: United States
- Media type: Print
- Pages: 128
- ISBN: 0590439448

Afternoon of the Elves is a 1989 children's novel by author Janet Taylor Lisle. Afternoon of the Elves was a Newbery Medal Honor Book in 1990. The plot centers around the budding friendship between a popular elementary-school student named Hillary, and her misanthropic next-door neighbor Sarah-Kate. The two investigate a tiny village in Sarah-Kate's back yard, and as the story progresses, more of Sarah-Kate's personal life is revealed.
