= Whirligig (novel) =

1998 novel by Paul Fleischman

- First edition
- Author: Paul Fleischman
- Language: English
- Genre: Fiction
- Publisher: Henry Holt and Company
- Publication date: May 15, 1998
- Publication place: United States
- Pages: 133 pages

Whirligig is a 1998 novel written by Paul Fleischman. It is about a teenager who builds a Whirligig in each of the corners of the United States in order to pay restitution (and to find redemption for himself) after he kills another person, by accident, in a suicide attempt by car crash.

== Plot ==
Seventeen-year-old Brent Bishop has moved with his parents in Chicago, Illinois. He goes to a party in an attempt to fit in and become popular. He decides to talk to Brianna, a popular girl at the party. She yells at him to stop bothering her and to leave her alone. Chaz, the party host, mocks him for his actions at the party. Angered, Brent retaliates and then drives away, upset, and embarrassed. After committing social suicide, he comes to the conclusion that real suicide is the only future for him. In his own mind, he is a king, driven by depression and alcohol. He crashes into a car driven by a girl named Lea Zamora. Brent survives, but Lea dies in the crash, and Brent is left with guilt and a feeling of desperation to improve his seemingly meaningless life. Instead of a conventional prison sentence, Brent agrees to a form of restitution chosen by Lea's mother. Lea's mother tells Brent to construct and establish four whirligigs at each corner of the Contiguous United States in order to memorialize and carry on Lea's philanthropic ideals (Lea’s grandfather used to do that for her). Brent’s life beginning after the crash is shown, which serves as a wake-up call to his existence. It took a bad situation to change his perspective, and he found purpose - to share Lea’s spirit among people she did not know. Brent agrees to this, as he feels guilty for his actions. He receives a bus pass from Lea's family and supplies to help him build his whirligigs, hoping to find meaning in his life.

When Brent arrives at Bellevue, Washington he starts to make his first whirligig, a harpist (more specifically an angel without wings). There, he meets a cyclist who plays Go, who teaches him about the movement of life. In San Diego, California, Brent wanted to stay at a hostel but they tell him that only foreign travelers can stay there. The clerk told him facts about Canada and let him in. He meets a foreign student named Emil at the hostel, he inspires Brent with his knowledge, curiosity, and confidence. Before leaving San Diego, he makes his second whirligig, a mermaid on top of a whale, he also begins playing the harmonica. In Miami, Florida, he ponders the concepts of religion. With the help of some children on the beach, Brent makes his penultimate whirligig, a marching band. His last whirligig was built in Weeksboro, Maine, a decorative model of Lea Zamora which spun its arms and other parts in the wind. After that he meets a female painter and confesses what he did and how Leah died. She realizes Brent's problems and helps him, allowing him to finally realize he was free. He decides to place a whirligig in every state, eventually facing his parents and Lea's mother again. Meanwhile, the whirligigs impact the lives of other people that come across them long after Brent has left. They give hope to others, such as the supposed prayer to the wind (which is actually Lea's name written on the whirligig).

In Weeksboro, a girl named Alexandra takes her friend Steph takes her to the decorative whirligig and uses a guided imagery exercise to imagine Steph finding the perfect boyfriend, even though Steph thinks the idea is silly. Three years later, Steph reveals that she did find the love of her life, so she still helps care for the whirligig and honors Alexandra's friendship. In Miami, a Puerto Rican street sweeper nicknamed Flaco who lost his family's farm, is struggling to learn English, losing his daughter, and the noisy conflict within his family and community. After seeing Brent’s marching band whirligig and realizing that even the peaceful shearwater birds live in flocks and struggle together, he accepts that conflict is a natural part of life and returns home with a new perspective. In Bellevue, Anthony, an adopted Korean fifth grader who loves baseball but is pressured by his mother to become an outstanding violinist, secretly stops practicing and performs poorly at a recital. His violin teacher explains that people need rest just like the harpist whirligig pauses between movements, so Anthony's mother lets him quit violin, and he begins to feel happier and more free. In San Diego, a girl named Jenny takes her grandmother, a Holocaust survivor, around. She was thinking they were running errands, but she realizes her grandmother is actually revisiting meaningful places from her past to say goodbye. At the end, they stop at the mermaid whirligig, where her grandmother teaches Jenny that despite the horrors she survived in her youth, people should choose to remember goodness, hope, and laughter.

== Style ==
The novel alternates the perspective of the narration in every chapter. Among these is Brent, whose perspective takes up every other chapter starting with Chapter 1. In the other chapters, Anthony, Jenny, Flaco, and Steph are introduced. They are all profoundly affected by the whirligigs left behind by Brent, who learns the reality of life and learns not to lean toward materialistic possessions, rather, focusing on the improvement of his life, and how he can serve up to the same philanthropic qualities Lea had.
