= Seedfolks =

Novel by Paul Fleischman

- First edition
- Author: Paul Fleischman
- Illustrator: Judy Pedersen
- Language: English
- Genre: Children's literature
- Published: 1997
- Publication place: United States
- Media type: Print
- Pages: 80
- ISBN: 0-06-027471-9
- OCLC: 34943325

Seedfolks (1997) is a children's novella written by Paul Fleischman, with illustrations by Judy Pedersen. The story is told by a diverse cast of characters living on (or near) Gibb Street in Cleveland, Ohio, each from a different ethnic group. Chapter by chapter, each character describes the transformation of an empty lot into a vibrant community garden, and in doing so, they each experience their own transformations.

== Summary ==
Nine year old Kim plants lima beans in a vacant lot to honor her late father. An elderly woman Ana spots Kim digging and assumes she is burying drugs or a gun, but is surprised to see it is beans. Ana calls Wendell to help Kim, which gives him a sense of control in his life. Gonzalo's uncle struggles to assimilate to Cleveland until he starts farming in the vacant lot.

Leona successfully petitions the city government to clear out the trash from the vacant lot and declare it a community garden. Sam is disappointed that the gardeners were dividing up the garden, just like the town. Virgil is disappointed when his father hogs space to try to make a profit.

Sae Young overcomes her agoraphobia by giving the gardeners funnels. Curtis plants tomatoes to show his maturity and impress his crush. Nora lifts her patient's spirits by taking him to the garden. Maricela feels better about being a pregnant teen when she learns about the cycles of life in the garden. Amir reflects that the community garden had broken down the stereotypes the people had for each other.

Florence describes how her ancestors moved across the country and became "seedfolk" when they planted their roots into a new town. She reflects that the people who started the garden are seedfolk as well. When the winter comes, she is worried that the community will forget about the garden. However, when she sees Kim planting lima beans in the spring again, she has faith that the garden will thrive again.

== Characters ==
- Kim: Vietnamese 9-year-old.
- Ana: White woman
- Wendell: White janitor
- Gonzalo: Guatemalan teen
- Leona: Black woman
- Sam: White man
- Virgil: Haitian teen
- Sae Young: Korean woman
- Curtis: Black man
- Nora: British woman
- Maricela: Mexican sixteen-year-old
- Amir: Indian man
- Florence: Black woman

== Awards and recognitions ==
- ALA Best Books for Young Adults (1998)
- Buckeye Children's Book Award (1999), Grades 6-8
- Special Book Award of China (2008)
