= Trouble Don't Last =

2002 novel by Shelley Pearsall

Trouble Don't Last is a 2002 historical novel for young readers by the American author Shelley Pearsall. It was her first novel and was published by Alfred A. Knopf. The book won the 2003 Scott O'Dell Award for Historical Fiction.

== Plot ==
Samuel is an 11-year-old boy enslaved on a plantation in Kentucky. An older enslaved man named Harrison urges him to run away, and the two escape north on the Underground Railroad. On the way, Samuel comes to understand what freedom means while facing the brutality of slavery and the danger of being caught.
