= Charley Skedaddle =

1987 children's book by Patricia Beatty

- Author: Patricia Beatty
- Language: English
- Subject: Civil War
- Genre: Children's fiction
- Publisher: Troll Associates
- Publication date: 1987
- Publication place: United States
- Media type: Print
- Pages: 186 pages

Charley Skedaddle is a children's fiction book by Patricia Beatty. The book was first released in 1987 through Troll Associates, later winning the 1988 Scott O'Dell Award for Historical Fiction. Charley Skedaddle is based on true American Civil War records.

== Synopsis ==
The book follows Charley, a twelve-year-old boy who runs errands for the leader of the Bowery Boys. Then he decides to leave home after joining the Bowery Boys gang and causing trouble. All Charley wants is to be like his older brother Johnny, who was killed during the Battle of Gettysburg, so he leaves behind his gang life to join the 140th Regiment. He is initially eager to fight, but flees shortly after shooting a Rebel soldier. Ashamed, Charley keeps running and is captured by an enemy soldier but later flees again after gaining a chance to escape. He keeps running until he reaches the Blue Ridge Mountains, where he lives with Granny Bent, an elderly mountain woman who calls herself a "doctor-woman". Charley learns much from her and gains a new sense of maturity and self-respect. He is inevitably forced to flee again but with the knowledge that what he has gained from his time in the mountains will go with him.

== Reception ==
Reception for Charley Skedaddle was positive, with the book receiving the 1988 Scott O'Dell Award for Historical Fiction.

The book is utilized in many classrooms, with teachers using it to help inform students about the American Civil War.
