= A Fate Totally Worse than Death =

Novel by Paul Fleischman

- First edition 1995
- Author: Paul Fleischman
- Cover artist: Jeff Wack
- Language: English
- Genre: Parody
- Published: 1995 (Candlewick)
- Publication place: United States
- Media type: Print (Hardback)
- Pages: 128pp

A Fate Totally Worse than Death is a spoof horror novel for young adults by Paul Fleischman, published in 1995, in which a badly behaved clique of high school girls get their comeuppance.

== Plot introduction ==
Danielle, Brooke and Tiffany are planning an evil welcome to Cliffside High for Helga, the ravishing exchange student from Norway—until they realize that something ghastly is happening to them, something they'd no doubt describe as...'a fate totally worse than death!'.

== Plot summary ==
The book is a parody of young adult horror fiction. It is about three high school girls, Danielle, Brooke and Tiffany, popular, privileged and malicious. They are known as the Huns of Cliffside High.

A beautiful foreign exchange student from Norway named Helga steals their spotlight and grabs the attention of the school stud Drew. They become insanely jealous and accuse Helga of being a ghost because of her pale skin and light hair. Determined to win their popularity back, the girls conjure up numerous ways to torture Helga. However, every time the girls try to "mess up" Helga in some way, a strong force holds them back. For example, when she tries to cut off Helga's hair, Brooke becomes completely paralyzed and limp.

The paralysis does go away, but they soon begin to notice other changes. Tiffany complains of severe pain in her knuckles and also develops a bladder problem, forcing her to wear diapers, and Danielle is slowly losing all of her teeth while Brooke is losing her hair. The girls also complain of getting liver spots on their skin. Eventually they realize that although they are only in high school, they are aging rapidly and suffering complaints typical of septuagenarians.

The horrified girls believe Helga is doing this to them. They think that if they kill Drew, he will become a ghost just like Helga, making her happy enough to grant them mercy. They arrange for Drew and Helga to meet at the park the next night. However, in their attempt to shoot Drew, the girls accidentally shoot Helga instead.

Danielle winds up in a hospital bed, plugged into many tubes and practically dying. Mrs. Witt, an elderly woman that she used to visit, talks to her for a while, and then reveals the reason for the girls' problems. Mrs. Witt tells her that Charity Chase, a girl killed by Danielle, Brooke and Tiffany not too long ago because Drew was interested in her, was her granddaughter. She says her friend's husband injected a potion into the girls, making it so the faster their hearts beat, the older they became, as punishment for killing her wonderful granddaughter. Mrs. Witt taunts Danielle for not being able to move, and finally does the same thing Danielle did in the nursing home when she thought Mrs. Witt was asleep—eats all of her cherry truffles.

== Adaptations ==
The book was adapted into a direct-to-video film, Bad Girls from Valley High, in 2005.
