= Shades of Gray (Reeder novel) =

1989 novel by Carolyn Reeder

- Cover of 1999 Australian edition
- Author: Carolyn Reeder
- Language: English
- Genre: Children's fiction, Historical Fiction
- Set in: Shenandoah Valley, 1865
- Publication date: 1989
- Publication place: United States
- Media type: Print (Hardcover, Paperback)
- Pages: 165 pp (1991 edition, paperback)
- Awards: Scott O'Dell Award for Historical Fiction, winner, 1989; 1990 Jefferson's Cup Award winner; ALA Notable Children's Book
- ISBN: 0-380-71232-6 (1991 paperback)
- LC Class: PZ7.R25416 Sh 1989

Shades of Gray is a 1989 novel by Carolyn Reeder about a boy named Will. At the end of the American Civil War, twelve-year-old Will, an orphan, is left to live with his aunt and uncle. He considers his uncle a traitor and a coward because he refuses to be a Confederate and take any part in the war at all. Gradually, Will learns the true meaning of courage.

== Awards ==
- 1989 Scott O'Dell Award for Historical Fiction
- ALA Notable Children's Book
- 1990 Jefferson Cup Award by the Virginia Library Association
