= Nicole Bilderback =

American actress

- Born: Korea
- Occupation: Actress
- Years active: 1995–present

Nicole Bilderback is an American actress, known for her recurring guest roles on the television programs Dark Angel and Dawson's Creek, and the films Clueless, Bring It On and Bad Girls From Valley High (a.k.a. A Fate Totally Worse than Death). She also was one of the Cordettes, Cordelia Chase's friends, on the Buffy the Vampire Slayer episode "The Wish" and the Unaired Buffy pilot. She also starred in a few episodes in season 6 of The Fresh Prince of Bel Air as Ashley's friend.

== Life and career ==
Born in Korea, Bilderback was adopted by an American family and raised in Dallas, Texas. She moved to Los Angeles in 1993.

Bilderback's first role came in 1995 when she appeared in the film Clueless, playing alongside Alicia Silverstone, Stacey Dash, Brittany Murphy, and Elisa Donovan. She also appeared in the Clueless television series for a three episode stint. She appeared on the August 2001 cover of KoreAm Journal, on issue 3 of the 2001 cover of Yolk, and as a medical student in House. Bilderback rode in the 2002 Lunar New Year Parade and Festival.

In 2014, she starred in the action movie Mercenaries, alongside Cynthia Rothrock, Brigitte Nielsen, Vivica A. Fox, Zoë Bell and Kristanna Loken.

== Filmography ==
=== Film ===
Year	Title	Role	Notes
1995	Clueless	Summer	
1998	Can't Hardly Wait	Ready to Have Sex Girl	
2000	Forever Lulu	Layla	
2000	Bring It On	Whitney	
2000	Paper Bullets	Leesu	
2003	Legally Blonde 2: Red, White & Blonde	Congresswoman	
2004	The Plight of Clownana	Katie Rosenbaum	Short film
2005	Bad Girls from Valley High	Tiffany	
2005	Cruel World	Mikko	
2007	Sex and Death 101	Dr. Mirabella Stone (#66)	
2007	The Box	Sgt. Marti Chang	
2007	Sincere	Amanda	Video short
2008	The New Twenty	Julie Kim	
2009	The Bourne Stupidity	Martha	Short film
2014	Mercenaries	Mei-Lin Fong	

=== Television ===
Year	Title	Role	Notes
1995	The Fresh Prince of Bel-Air	Janet	Recurring role
1996	Silk Stalkings	Susie Chen	"Family Values"
1996	The Parent 'Hood	Cheryl	"We Don't Need Another Hero"
1996	Sabrina, the Teenage Witch	Sasha	"Dream Date"
1996	ABC Afterschool Special	Laura	"Teenage Confidential"
1997	Friends 'Til the End	Paige	TV film
1997	Step by Step	Jaclyn	"The Big Date"
1997	7th Heaven	Lauren	"Girls Just Want to Have Fun"
1997	Clueless	Nicole	"The Party's Over", "Homecoming Queen"
1998	ER	Claire	"A Bloody Mess"
1998	Buffy the Vampire Slayer	Cordette	"The Wish"
2000	Zoe, Duncan, Jack and Jane	Chi Mei Chin	"My Dinner with Andy"
2000	The Norm Show	Gretchen	"The Norm Law"
2000–01	Dark Angel	Brin	Recurring role
2001–03	Dawson's Creek	Heather Tracy	Recurring role
2004	Eddie's Father	Jenna Livingston	TV film
2005	Without a Trace	Wendy Kim	"Honor Bound"
2005	House	Caring Student	"Three Stories"
2006	Heroes	Ms. Sakamoto	"Collision", "Hiros"
2006	Sideliners	Yuki Quin	TV film
2007	Hidden Palms	Blair Meadows	"Pilot"
2008	Cold Case	Nikki Sun	"Triple Threat"
2009	Numb3rs	Tina Tran	"Old Soldiers"
2010	Castle	Joy Harrison	"Close Encounters of the Murderous Kind"
2011	Human Target	Sarah Han	"The Trouble with Harry"
2012	The Mentalist	Francesca Ehrlich	"Panama Red"
2014	Perception	Carol Lao	"Curveball"
2016	Bones	Eve Mayweather	"The Jewel in the Crown"
2018	This Close	Mona	"Who We Are"
2018	Good Girls	Dr. Melanie Serden	"Pilot"
2018	Andi Mack	Ling	"Howling at the Moon Festival"
2018	The Rookie	IA Detective Emily Barrett	"Time of Death"
2018	Boomers	Nicolette	"The Gods Must Be Crazy"
2019	NCIS: New Orleans	Nancy Cooper	"Vindicta"
2020	Brooklyn Nine-Nine	Captain Julie Kim	"Captain Kim"
2021	Cruel Summer	Denise	Recurring role
2022	Cloudy with a Chance of Christmas	Lisa Liu Lawson	TV film
TBA	Snow	Pocahontas	TV film, completed
