= Bull Run (novel) =

1993 novel by Paul Fleischman

- Author: Paul Fleischman
- Subject: American Civil War
- Genre: Historical fiction
- Set in: United States

Bull Run is a historical novel for children by Paul Fleischman, published in 1993. It consists of sixteen monologues by participants in the First Battle of Bull Run in 1861. The novel has won several awards.

== Summary ==
This historical fiction novel, written by Paul Fleischman, highlights the events surrounding the first major battle of the American Civil War, the Battle of Bull Run. It is told through the first-person perspectives of 16 different characters, both Union and Confederate.

== Characters ==
Northerners: Lily Malloy, Gideon Adams, Dietrich Herz, James Dacy, Nathaniel Epp, General Irvin McDowell, A.B. Tilbury, Edmund Upwing, and Carlotta King

Southerners: Colonel Oliver Brattle, Shem Suggs, Toby Boyce, Virgil Peavey

== Awards ==
Bull Run won several awards, including the 2012 Scott O'Dell Award for Historical Fiction, and was named a Best Book by the School Library Journal, a Notable Children's Books by the American Library Association, and a Notable Children's Books in the Language Arts by the National Council of Teachers of English.
