= Mildred D. Taylor =

American young adult novelist (born 1943)

- Born: Mildred DeLois Taylor; September 13, 1943 (age 82); Jackson, Mississippi, U.S.
- Education: University of Toledo (BA); University of Colorado, Boulder (MA)
- Occupation: Writer
- Relatives: Brittany Friedman
- Writing career
- Genre: Children's literature
- Notable work: Roll of Thunder, Hear My Cry
- Notable awards: Newbery Medal (1977); NSK Neustadt Prize for Children's Literature (2003); ALA Lifetime Achievement Award (2020); Children's Literature Legacy Award (2021)

Mildred DeLois Taylor (born September 13, 1943) is a Newbery Award-winning American young adult novelist. She is best known for her novel Roll of Thunder, Hear My Cry, part of her Logan family series.

Taylor is known for exploring powerful themes of family and racism faced by African Americans in the Deep South, in works that are accessible to young readers. She was awarded the 1977 Newbery Medal for Roll of Thunder, Hear My Cry and the inaugural NSK Neustadt Prize for Children's Literature in 2003. In 2020 she received the Coretta Scott King-Virginia Hamilton Award for Lifetime Achievement from the American Library Association, and in 2021, she won the Children's Literature Legacy Award.

== Biography ==
Taylor was born in Jackson, Mississippi, in 1943, and is the great-granddaughter of a former slave who was the son of an African-Indian woman and a white landowner. As a young child she moved to Toledo, Ohio, where she attended Toledo's public schools and eventually graduated from the University of Toledo in 1965. She then spent two years with the Peace Corps in Ethiopia, and, after returning to the United States, earned a master's degree in journalism at the University of Colorado where she was instrumental in creating a Black Studies Program as a member of the Black Student Alliance. She now lives in Colorado.

Taylor's books chronicle the lives of several generations of the Logan family, from times of slavery to the Jim Crow era. Her most recognizable work is Roll of Thunder, Hear My Cry (1976), which won the Newbery Medal in 1977 and has been integrated into the language arts curriculum in many classrooms across the United States. "Roll of Thunder" is flanked by several books that include titles such as Song of the Trees (1975), Let the Circle Be Unbroken (1981), The Road to Memphis (1992), and The Land (2001). Her collective contributions to children's literature resulted in her being awarded the inaugural NSK Neustadt Prize for Children's Literature in 2003.

Taylor's works are based on oral history told to her by her father, uncles, and aunt. Taylor has said that without her family, and especially without her father, her books "would not have been". She has stated that these anecdotes became very clear in her mind, and in fact, once she realized that adults talked about the past, "I began to visualize all the family who had once known the land, and I felt as if I knew them, too ..."

== Works ==
- Song of the Trees, 1975
- Roll of Thunder, Hear My Cry, 1976
- Let the Circle Be Unbroken, 1981
- The Gold Cadillac, 1987
- The Friendship, 1987
- Mississippi Bridge, 1990
- The Road to Memphis, 1992
- The Well: David's Story, 1995
- The Land, 2001
- All the Days Past, All the Days to Come, 2020

== Awards ==
Body of Work

- NSK Neustadt Prize for Children's Literature, 2003
- Coretta Scott King-Virginia Hamilton Lifetime Achievement Award, 2020
- Children's Literature Legacy Award, 2021

Song of the Trees

- First prize (African-American category), Council on Interracial Books for Children, 1973
- Outstanding Book of the Year Citation, The New York Times, 1975
- Jane Addams Honors Citation, 1976
- Coretta Scott King Honor Award, 1976

Roll of Thunder, Hear My Cry

- Notable Book Citation, American Library Association, 1976
- Jane Addams Honor Citation, 1977
- Coretta Scott King Honor Award, 1977
- Newbery Medal, 1977
- Buxtehude Bull Award, 1985

Let the Circle Be Unbroken

- Outstanding Book of the Year Citation, The New York Times, 1981
- Jane Addams Honor Citation, 1982
- American Book Award nomination, 1982
- Coretta Scott King Award, 1982

The Friendship

- Coretta Scott King Award, 1988
- Boston Globe–Horn Book Award for fiction, 1988

The Gold Cadillac

- Notable Book Citation, The New York Times, 1987
- Christopher Award, 1988

The Road to Memphis

- Special Award, Children's Book Council, 1988
- Coretta Scott King Award, 1991

Mississippi Bridge

- Christopher Award, 1990

The Well: David's Story

- Jane Addams Book Award, Jane Addams Peace Council, 1996

The Land

- Coretta Scott King Award, 2002
- ALA Best Book for Young Adults, 2002
- Scott O'Dell Award for Historical Fiction, 2002
