= The Friendship =

1987 children's novella by Mildred Taylor

- First edition
- Author: Mildred D. Taylor
- Illustrator: Max Ginsburg
- Language: English
- Genre: African-American Literature
- Publisher: Dial (hardback), Puffin (paperback)
- Publication date: 1987-09-30
- Publication place: United States
- Media type: Print (Hardback & Paperback)
- Pages: 56 pp
- Awards: 1988 Coretta Scott King Author Award
- ISBN: 0-8037-0417-8
- OCLC: 14965647
- LC Class: PZ7.T21723 Fr 1987

The Friendship is a children's novella by Mildred Taylor. Published in 1987, it is set in 1933 in Mississippi and deals with the unfair treatment of African Americans.

== Summary ==
Mr. Tom Bee, an elderly black man, twice saved the life of a white storekeeper when he was a boy. The boy, John Wallace, was grateful and even allowed Mr. Bee to always call him by his first name. However, years later, Mr. Wallace does not allow Mr. Bee to call him John, while he and even his son call him Tom, which he can do nothing about. Their friendship is ultimately put to the test, which four black children witness. Later Mr. Tom Bee is shot by John Wallace. Mr. Tom Bee crawls away, cursing John Wallace and refusing to give up calling him John.

== Reception ==
In giving The Friendship, a kirkus star, Kirkus Reviews wrote "From its quiet beginning, the tension grows relentlessly in this brief, carefully designed story." and "Ginsburg's black-and-white drawings are outstanding, his solid figures masterfully staged to convey the taut drama." It is also the subject of study at school.

== Awards ==
- 1988 Boston Globe–Horn Book Award winner
- 1988 Coretta Scott King Award winner
