= Eyes Wide Open (book) =

2014 book written by Paul Fleischman

Eyes Wide Open: Going Behind the Environmental Headlines
- Author: Paul Fleischman
- Language: English
- Subject: Environment
- Genre: Nonfiction
- Published: September 23, 2014
- Publication place: United States
- Pages: 208
- ISBN: 978-0763675455

Eyes Wide Open: Going Behind the Environmental Headlines is a young-adult nonfiction book written by Paul Fleischman and published by Candlewick Press in September 2014. The book was published in Australia by Walker Books on January 1, 2015.

Eyes Wide Open looks at five key issues: population, consumption, energy, food, and climate, drawing on history, psychology, sociology, and the role of money to explain both environmental issues and the human reaction to such issues, with a particular focus on "defense mechanisms," such as denialism, projection, and regression.

The book was an early catalyst in the creation of #globaltl hashtag and the Google+ Community of teacher-librarians interested in connecting students and schools through online collaborative projects.

The book includes a brief essay on "How to Weigh Information" in the back matter. The essay describes ways that readers can become active investigators, reading critically with an eye on the source. Photos, headlines, and references to related books, documentaries, articles, and websites appear throughout.

== Reception ==
The book received starred reviews in Publishers Weekly, Kirkus Reviews, Booklist, and School Library Journal. It has been named a finalist for one of the 2015 AAAS/Subaru Science Book and Film Prizes offered by the American Association for the Advancement of Science. The book was named an Outstanding Science Trade Book for students K-12 by the National Science Teachers Association and the Children's Book Council. School Library Journal added the book to their Editors' Choice, Books for Youth list and Kirkus Reviews added it to their Best Teen Nonfiction list of 2014.
