= Paul Fleischman =

American writer of children's books

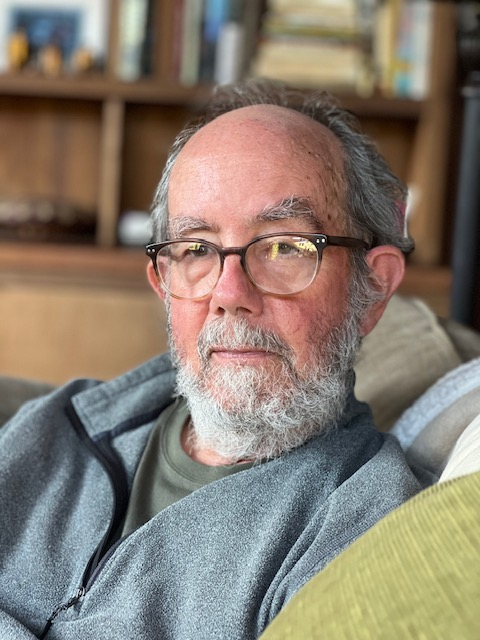
- Fleischman in 2022
- Education: University of California, Berkeley; University of New Mexico
- Occupations: Writer, playwright
- Parent: Sid Fleischman (father)
- Writing career
- Period: 1979–present
- Genre: Children's literature
- Website: paulfleischman.net

Paul Fleischman is an American writer of children's books. He and his father Sid Fleischman have both won the Newbery Medal from the American Library Association recognizing the year's "most distinguished contribution to American literature for children". For the body of his work he was the United States author nominee for the international Hans Christian Andersen Award in 2012.

== Early life ==
Paul Fleischman grew up in Santa Monica, California, the son of children's book author Sid Fleischman. At 19, he took a cross-country bicycle and train trip which ended with him living in a 200-year-old house in New Hampshire. The experience led to his historical fiction dealing with the Puritans' Indian wars, colonial peddlers, Philadelphia's yellow fever epidemic, and the Civil War. He attended college at University of California Berkeley and the University of New Mexico. Before writing full-time, he worked as a bagel baker, library shelver, bookstore clerk, and proofreader, the last leading to his grammar watchdog groups Colonwatch and The Society for the Prevention of Cruelty to English.

== Career ==
Fleischman's first books were written while he was still in college, inspired by his reading of folklore. His musical interests are reflected in his collections of poems for two and four speakers, so-called chamber music for speaking voices. Multiple points of view have been a hallmark of his fiction, beginning with Bull Run (1993), one of the first multiple-viewpoint novels published for children. This format was further explored in Seedfolks, the 50-voice aural collage Seek, the seven-plays-in-one Zap, and the joined Cinderella variants in Glass Slipper, Gold Sandal. The importance of history, community, art, and imagination have been frequent themes in his work.

== Awards ==
Fleischman won the 1989 Newbery Medal for Joyful Noise: Poems for Two Voices, only two years after his father won it for The Whipping Boy. Graven Images received a Newbery Honor award in 1983. He won a National Book Award nomination for Breakout in 2003, the 1994 Scott O'Dell Award for Historical Fiction for Bull Run, the 2002 California Young Reader Medal for Weslandia, Boston Globe–Horn Book Award honors for Joyful Noise and Saturnalia, the PEN Center USA Literary Award for The Dunderheads (2010), and the Christopher Medal for The Matchbox Diary (2013). Eyes Wide Open: Going Behind the Environmental Headlines (2014) was a finalist for the Los Angeles Times Book Prize, received the Green Earth Book Award from The Nature Generation, and won the Sigurd Olson Nature Writing Award. Paul Fleischman has also won awards from the Commonwealth Club of California and the Society of Children's Book Writers and Illustrators.

For the body of his work, he was the United States' nominee for the 2012 international Hans Christian Andersen Award. He also received the Leo Politi Golden Author Award given by California Readers in 2005 and the Horace Mann Upstanders Lifetime Achievement Award given by Antioch University in 2014.

== Works ==
=== For adults ===
- "Swat Radio", The New Yorker (November 24, 1997)
- A Book: Literary & Visual Musings on the Letter A [contributor], The Scribes 8 (1997)
- Logomaniacs (2010), play
- He Walked Among Us (New York: Argo Navis, 2012), novel

Articles

- "Sound and Sense", The Horn Book Magazine (September/October 1986)
- "Sid Fleischman", Horn Book (July/August 1987)
- "Paul Fleischman", Something About the Author Autobiography Series, Vol. 20, pp. 219–31
- "The Accidental Artist", School Library Journal (March 1999)

=== For children ===
Picture books

- The Birthday Tree (1979, 2008)
- The Animal Hedge (1983, 2003)
- Rondo in C (1988)
- Shadow Play (1990)
- Time Train (1991)
- Weslandia (1999)
- Lost: A Story in String (2000)
- Sidewalk Circus (2004)
- Glass Slipper, Gold Sandal: A Worldwide Cinderella (2007)
- The Dunderheads (2009)
- The Dunderheads Behind Bars (2012)
- The Matchbox Diary (2013)
- First Light, First Life: A Worldwide Creation Story (2016)
- Fearsome Giant, Fearless Child: A Worldwide Jack and the Beanstalk Story (2019)
- The Class With Wings (2024)

Younger fiction

- Half-A-Moon Inn (1980)
- Finzel The Farsighted (1983), illustrated by Marcia Sewall
- Phoebe Danger, Detective (1983)

Short stories

- Graven Images (1982, 2006), collection
- Coming-and-Going Men (1985), collection

Plays

- Mind's Eye (1999)
- Zap (2005)

Poetry

- I Am Phoenix: Poems for Two Voices (1985)
- Joyful Noise: Poems for Two Voices (1988)
- Big Talk: Poems for Four Voices (2000)

Novels

- Path of the Pale Horse (1983)
- Rear-View Mirrors (1986)
- Saturnalia (1990)
- The Borning Room (1991)
- Bull Run (1993)
- A Fate Totally Worse than Death (1995)
- Seedfolks (1997)
- Whirligig (1998)
- Seek (2001)
- Breakout (2003)

Nonfiction

- Townsend's Warbler (1992)
- Copier Creations (1993)
- Dateline: Troy (1996, 2006)
- "Interview with a Shrimp", When I Was Your Age, Vol. Two (1999)
- Cannibal in the Mirror (2000)
- Eyes Wide Open: Going Behind the Environmental Headlines (2014)
- No Map, Great Trip: A Young Writer's Road to Page One (2019)
- Alphamaniacs: Builders of 26 Wonders of the Word (2020)
