= Scott O'Dell Award for Historical Fiction =

Literary award

The Scott O'Dell Award for Historical Fiction is an annual American children's book award that recognizes historical fiction. It was established in 1982 by Scott O'Dell, author of Island of the Blue Dolphins and 25 other children's books, in hopes of increasing young readers' interest in the history that shaped their nation and their world. Eligibility for the award requires that a book be written in English for children or young adults, published by an American publisher, and the author must be a United States citizen. The award is recognized in the United States by publishers of children's literature and young adult literature, the American Library Association, and the Assembly for Literature of Adolescents.

== Award nomination ==
Books may be submitted throughout the year to the Award Committee. Award nomination forms must be submitted with the required information for each title a publisher, literary agent, or author wish to bring to the attention of the Award Committee.

== Selection committee ==
The annual selection from qualifying books is made by the O'Dell Committee. Zena Sutherland — who was Professor Emeritus of Children's Literature at the University of Chicago — headed the committee from its formation in 1982 until her death in 2002. The home of The Scott O’Dell Award for Historical Fiction was moved in 2022 to the Reinberger Children’s Library Center at the Kent State University iSchool in Kent, Ohio. In partnership with Kent State University, the O'Dell family and matriarchs Elizabeth Hall (Scott's widow) and Lauren Anderson Gerber (Scott's granddaughter) continue to administer and fund the annual award.

The 2024 Committee includes:

- Maria Trivisonno (Chair), Family Engagement Specialist, Cuyahoga County Public Library, Parma, OH
- Kristen Blackshear, Social Studies Teacher, Glenwood School, Smiths Station, AL, and Adjunct History Instructor, Southern Union State Community College, Opelika, AL
- Marianne Martens, Ph.D., Professor, Kent State University School of Information, Kent, OH
- Mary Anne Nichols, Senior Lecturer, Kent State University School of Information, Kent, OH
- Uma Nori, Head, Youth Services, Thomas Ford Memorial Library, Western Springs, IL
- Debra Liddell Quarles, Library and Information Specialist, Shaker Heights City Schools, Shaker Heights, OH
- Mike Rogalla, Children's Services Manager, Champaign Public Library, Champaign, IL
- Kerry Shelton, Principal, St. Gabriel Consolidated School, Glendale, OH.

== History ==
No award was given in 1982 and 1983, as the committee felt that "no books of sufficient merit had been published". Elizabeth George Speare was the first recipient, receiving the award for her book, The Sign of the Beaver, a tale of wilderness survival. The award has been presented every year since 1984. O'Dell himself won the award in 1987 for Streams to the River, River to the Sea, his fictional retelling of the story of Sacagawea. Louise Erdrich has won the award twice, in 2006 and in 2013.

== Winners ==
Year	Recipient	Book Title	Publisher
2026	María Dolores Águila	A Sea of Lemon Trees: The Corrido of Roberto Alvarez	Roaring Press Book
2025	Kim Johnson	The Color of a Lie	Random House Books for Young Readers
2024	L. M. Elliott	Bea and the New Deal Horse	Katherine Tegen Books
2023	Irene Latham and Charles Waters	African Town	G.P. Putnam's Sons Books for Young Readers
2022	Justina Ireland	Ophie’s Ghosts	Balzer + Bray
2021	Helen Frost	All He Knew	Farrar Straus and Giroux
2020	Thanhhà Lại	Butterfly Yellow	HarperCollins
2019	Lesa Cline-Ransome	Finding Langston	Holiday House
2018	Lauren Wolk	Beyond the Bright Sea	Dutton Books for Young Readers
2017	Jennifer L. Holm	Full of Beans	Random House
2016	Laura Amy Schlitz	The Hired Girl	Candlewick Press
2015	Kirby Larson	Dash	Scholastic
2014	Kirkpatrick Hill	Bo at Ballard Creek	Henry Holt and Co.
2013	Louise Erdrich	Chickadee	HarperCollins
2012	Jack Gantos	Dead End in Norvelt	Farrar, Straus and Giroux (BYR)
2011	Rita Williams-Garcia	One Crazy Summer	Amistad
2010	Matt Phelan	The Storm in the Barn	Candlewick
2009	Laurie Halse Anderson	Chains	Simon & Schuster
2008	Christopher Paul Curtis	Elijah of Buxton	Scholastic Press
2007	Ellen Klages	The Green Glass Sea	Viking Children's Books
2006	Louise Erdrich	The Game of Silence	HarperCollins Children's Books
2005	A LaFaye	Worth	Simon & Schuster
2004	Richard Peck	The River Between Us	Dial Press
2003	Shelley Pearsall	Trouble Don't Last	Alfred A Knopf
2002	Mildred D. Taylor	The Land	Phyllis Fogelman Books
2001	Janet Taylor Lisle	The Art of Keeping Cool	A Richard Jackson Book/Atheneum
2000	Miriam Bat-Ami	Two Suns in the Sky	Front Street/Cricket Books
1999	Harriette Robinet	Forty Acres and Maybe a Mule	Jean Fritz/Atheneum
1998	Karen Hesse	Out of the Dust	Scholastic
1997	Katherine Paterson	Jip, His Story	Dutton
1996	Theodore Taylor	The Bomb	Harcourt, Brace
1995	Graham Salisbury	Under the Blood Red Sun	Delacorte
1994	Paul Fleischman	Bull Run	Laura Geringer/Harper-Collins
1993	Michael Dorris	Morning Girl	Hyperion
1992	Mary Downing Hahn	Stepping on the Cracks	Clarion
1991	Pieter Van Raven	A Time of Troubles	Charles Scribner's Sons
1990	Carolyn Reeder	Shades of Gray	Macmillan
1989	Lyll Becerra de Jenkins	The Honorable Prison	Lodestar/Dutton
1988	Patricia Beatty	Charley Skedaddle	Morrow
1987	Scott O'Dell	Streams to the River, River to the Sea	Houghton Mifflin
1986	Patricia MacLachlan	Sarah, Plain and Tall	Harper & Row
1985	Avi	The Fighting Ground	Lippincott
1984	Elizabeth George Speare	The Sign of the Beaver	Houghton Mifflin

== See also ==
- Newbery Medal

== Documents ==
- Submission Information.
- 2007 Committee Press Release.
