= Roll of Thunder, Hear My Cry =

1976 novel by Mildred D. Taylor

- First edition
- Author: Mildred D. Taylor
- Cover artist: Jerry Pinkney
- Language: English
- Genre: Historical fiction
- Publisher: Dial Press
- Publication date: 1976
- Publication place: United States
- Media type: Print (hardback & paperback)
- Pages: 288
- ISBN: 0-590-98207-9
- Preceded by: Song of the Trees
- Followed by: Let the Circle Be Unbroken

Roll of Thunder, Hear My Cry is a 1977 Newbery Medal awarded novel by Mildred D. Taylor. It is a part of her Logan family series, a sequel to her 1975 novella Song of the Trees.

In the book, Taylor explores the struggles of African Americans in 1930s Mississippi through the perspective of nine-year-old Cassie Logan. The novel contains several themes, including Jim Crow segregation, Black landownership, sharecropping, the Great Depression, and lynching.

== Plot ==
In 1933, 9-year-old Cassie Logan lives in rural Mississippi with her three brothers, Stacey (12 years old), Christopher-John (7 years old), and Clayton Chester, nicknamed "Little Man" (6 years old). Unlike most black families who sharecropped during this time, the Logan family owns the land on which they reside. It originally belonged to a white plantation owner, Harlan Granger, who sold it to cover his taxes during Reconstruction.

Rather than a single, overarching storyline, the bulk of the novel consists of several intertwining plots, each involving one or more members of the Logan family and illustrating various aspects of black/white interactions during the nadir of American race relations. Several episodes feature black characters being humiliated by powerful white citizens and being forced to weigh the potential cost of standing up for themselves.

At school, Cassie and Little Man notice that the books they use were originally distributed to the white children, and given to the black students once they wore out. Cassie's father David visits the family from his job on the railroad during the holidays.

After Cassie is humiliated by Lillian Jean Simms, a white girl, she pretends to forgive Lillian Jean and becomes friends with her long enough to learn sensitive information about the Simms family. Cassie assaults Lillian Jean and forces her to apologize for all the humiliation she inflicted on her, then threatens to reveal all of Lillian Jean's secrets if she tells anyone what happened.

When Cassie's mother Mary, a teacher at her children's school, catches Stacey's friend T.J. Avery cheating on an important history midterm, T.J. gets her fired from her job, with help from the racist Wallace family.

Mary organizes a boycott of the Wallaces' store because they are the cause of most of the trouble between the blacks and the whites, as well as possibly being members of the Ku Klux Klan. Later, David and his hired hand Mr. Morrison are attacked on the road, with David being shot, but surviving. Mr. Morrison brutally trashes the attackers, who turn out to be the Wallaces. As a result, the white community forces the bank to call the Logans' mortgage. David's brother Hammer sells his new silver Packard to pay it off and avoid losing the family land.

T.J. ends his friendship with Stacey and befriends Lillian Jean's two racist older brothers, R.W. and Melvin. The Simms boys convince T.J. to help them rob Barnett's Mercantile, during which Jim Lee, the owner, is killed by R.W. Both he and Melvin set T.J. up to take the blame and beat him severely when he threatens to expose their crime.

The book ends with T.J. about to be lynched for the death of Barnett, when the cotton fields catch fire. The community bands together to stop the fire from spreading. Cassie realizes that her father set the fire to save T.J. Stacey asks what T.J.'s fate will be. David tells the children T.J. will likely be convicted of Barnett's murder and may be executed. Cassie, overwhelmed by the news, silently goes to bed. Although Cassie never liked T.J., she cries for him and the land.

== Characters ==
=== The Logan Family ===
- Cassie Logan: The narrator of the story, which takes place from her point of view, she is a strong-willed, precocious nine-year-old girl willing to fight for anything she believes in. Cassie is a fourth grader, and she is a tomboy who learns valuable life lessons from her parents, grandmother, and elder brother Stacey.
- Stacey Logan: The eldest son of Mary and David Logan, a 13-year-old boy who feels that it is his responsibility to take care of the family while his father is away working on the railroad. He is a seventh grader who attends the same class his mother teaches. He is portrayed as a strong-minded young man who is loving towards his family.
- Christopher-John Logan: The second youngest kid in the Logan family, a seven-year-old boy. He is notorious for being a rule-follower and doesn't like going against the family's decisions or getting himself in trouble.
- Clayton Chester "Little Man" Logan: The youngest Logan, a six-year-old first grader. He is very tidy and does not like to be discriminated against, even though he does not understand what that means at his young age.
- David Logan: The father of the Logan children, who call him Papa. He works on the railroad and tries to teach his children life lessons in hopes of keeping them out of trouble.
- Mary Logan: The mother of the Logan children, a schoolteacher who believes that the status quo of racism shouldn't be accepted. She teaches her students radical material about slavery that isn't included in their textbooks and also works to support the boycott of the Wallaces' store. She tries to fight against anti-black racism while also protecting her family from harm.
- Caroline "Big Ma" Logan: The mother of David and Hammer Logan and the paternal grandmother of the Logan children. She is portrayed as a strong and good-natured 60-year-old woman who still works in the fields. Big Ma influenced Cassie by passing on family stories and oral history to her growing up. She helps many people who are sick and those who have been treated badly by white people. She is very religious and has passed her views to Cassie.
- Hammer Logan: David Logan's older brother and Cassie's uncle. Hammer is a black veteran of World War I, during which he nearly lost his left leg. He moved to Chicago before the events of the novel to escape Mississippi's virulent racism. He is portrayed as having a hair-trigger temper, which is something a black man "isn't allowed to have" in the Jim Crow South. He provides financial assistance to the rest of the family several times, which they secretly appreciate.

=== Other characters ===
- T.J. Avery: A manipulative, foolish 14-year-old who is Stacey's friend. He is disliked by the other Logan children, including Stacey. T.J. is a troublemaker who is responsible for getting Mama fired from her job. At the end of the novel, T.J. is severely beaten by R.W. and Melvin Simms, who break his ribs and later his jaw, and nearly gets lynched for a crime he did not commit. Papa saves him for the time being by setting fire to his own land.
- Claude Avery: T.J.’s younger brother, who is good friends with his classmate Christopher-John Logan. He is quieter than T.J. but often gets blamed for T.J.’s troublemaking.
- The Averys: T.J.'s family, including his father, his mother, and his seven younger siblings, four of whom are preschoolers. They are friends with the Logans.
- Joe Avery: The father of the Avery children, a sharecropper who works on Harlan Granger's land.
- The Berrys: A black family that lives in Smellings Creek. They don't often appear in the area, but they do occasionally attend the local black church.
- John Henry Berry: A black veteran of World War I and lynching victim.
- Beacon Berry: John Henry's brother.
- Samuel Berry: The uncle of John Henry and Beacon. All three men are dragged out of their house and burned alive. Samuel and Beacon survive the attack, but are badly burned.
- Charlie Simms: The father of the Simms children. Though his family is as poor as the Logans, he believes they are racially superior.
- Jeremy Simms: A white boy who is friends with the Logan children. He doesn't abuse black people, unlike the rest of his family, even though he’s harassed both at home and school for associating with the Logan children.
- R.W. and Melvin Simms: Jeremy's elder brothers, who both dropped out of school years ago. They are white supremacists who are part of the lynch mob that nearly kills T.J., but they do help their father and brother fight the fire set by Cassie's father soon afterwards.
- Lillian Jean Simms: Jeremy’s elder sister. She sees herself as racially superior to the Logans, although they are no wealthier. She treats Cassie rudely but is later outsmarted and humiliated by the younger girl, who pretends to befriend her.
- Wade Jamison: A white lawyer sympathetic to the plight of black families in the South. He supports the Logans and other black families in their town, helping the black sharecroppers boycott the Wallaces’ store by backing their credit.
- L.T. Morrison: A gigantic, extremely strong railroad worker who becomes an honorary member of the Logan family after he is fired from his job. His entire family was killed by "night men" when he was six years old.
- Harlan Granger: A white landowner who owns a lot of the land in the area, e.g. Granger Plantation. He wants to take all the land and money away from black people, most of whom are sharecroppers.
- The Barnetts: A racist white couple who own a general store in Strawberry. Jim Lee, the husband, treats his black customers like second-class citizens, only serving them after he is done serving all of his white customers. After Cassie calls out his discriminatory behavior, Mr. Barnett angrily kicks her out of his store. Mr. Barnett is killed by the Simms brothers during a robbery, but Mrs. Barnett accuses T.J. of the murder because he was the only unmasked criminal.
- Sam Tatum: A black man who accuses Jim Lee Barnett of charging him for items he hadn't ordered. After he admits to calling Mr. Barnett a liar, he is tarred and feathered by a group of "night men".
- The Wallaces: The Wallace brothers (Kaleb, Thurston, and Dewberry) are violent, racist white men. Papa warns the Logan children to avoid the Wallaces' general store, and Mama even organizes an informal boycott after revealing to the Logan children that the Wallaces were responsible for the Berrys' burnings. The Wallaces are partly responsible for Mama getting fired, and Kaleb threatens to kill Mr. Morrison after his two brothers are injured in a fight with him and Papa.
- Ted Grimes: A bus driver for the all-white Jefferson Davis County School, he enjoys splashing black children with mud and dust every day by barreling his school bus carrying white children down the dirt road. The Logan children lay a trap by digging a large hole in the road and filling it with water, putting Grimes' bus out of commission for at least two weeks.
- Little Willie Wiggins: One of Stacey's seventh-grade classmates.
- Moe Turner: Another one of Stacey's seventh-grade classmates.
- Mr. Montier: A white landowner who owns a lot of former plantation land in the area, he and Mr. Granger are quite ruthless with the sharecroppers who work on their land. After Mr. Montier finds out about the black families' boycott of the Wallace store, he forces his sharecroppers to pay him a larger percentage of the proceeds from their cotton sales than before.
- Mr. Turner: Moe's father, a black sharecropper who works on land owned by Mr. Montier. His family has no choice but to shop at the Wallace store since Mr. Montier backs their credit there. Mr. Turner reluctantly boycotts the store.
- Silas Lanier: A black sharecropper who works on Harlan Granger's land.
- Miss Crocker: Cassie's teacher who believes that the black students should be happy with the books they get, regardless of their inferior or used quality.

== Reception ==
At the time of the book's publication, Kirkus Reviews wrote, "Taylor trusts to her material and doesn't try to inflate Cassie's role in these events, and though the strong, clear-headed Logan family is no doubt an idealization, their characters are drawn with quiet affection and their actions tempered with a keen sense of human fallibility." In a retrospective essay about the Newbery Medal-winning books from 1976 to 1985, literary critic Zena Sutherland wrote of Roll of Thunder, Hear My Cry, "There is no doubt that this book remains today as effective dramatically and as important sociologically as it was when it appeared... This is not an unflawed book, but it is a memorable one."

In 2014, writing in The New York Times, novelist Ayana Mathis named Roll of Thunder, Hear My Cry as the most terrifying book she had ever read. Mathis wrote of reading the book at the age of nine: "I not only learned what it meant to live a perilous life, surrounded by open hostility, but I also made the grim discovery that such circumstances even existed."

In addition to a Newbery Medal, the novel was a National Book Award finalist and Coretta Scott King Award honoree.

=== Censorship and banning incidents ===
In 2020, the Burbank Unified School District banned the book from the curriculum due to complaints from four parents, who allege the material in the book could lead to potential harm to the district's African-American students. However, scholar Hyun-Joo Yoo argues that Roll of Thunder, Hear My Cry can have a more positive impact: Taylor purposefully writes from the perspective of African American protagonists who are strong-willed and effect change. Taylor's positive depictions in Roll of Thunder counter the long history of racist and negative stereotypes about African Americans. Brooks also argues that Roll of Thunder, Hear My Cry presents a minority perspective and challenges white-dominated narratives.

== Film ==
In 1978, the novel was adapted into a television film directed by Jack Smight and starring Claudia McNeil as Big Ma, Janet MacLachlan as Mama and Morgan Freeman as Uncle Hammer. The original 1978 version of this film ran for almost four hours and was shown over two nights in June 1978. The original version resembled the book much more than the current one does, as it includes several scenes from the book that are not shown in the current version, such as the Logan children's first day of school, their plan to sabotage the school bus, and Mama getting fired because of Mr. Granger.

After the first version was shown, the movie was heavily edited down to shorten its length. All material from Part 1 was removed, except for certain scenes that were abruptly added into Part 2. Small portions of some of the scenes from Part 1, i.e., Little Man throwing a book on the ground, Mama putting paper over the inside cover of a worn-out textbook, the kids digging a trap for the bus to get stuck in, Mr. Morrison introducing himself, appear in a pre-title sequence, not unlike the kind of introduction for part 2 of a two-part TV episode. The final scene in Part 1 is kept, for it has much to do with the events of Part 2.

The film won modest praise, including two Primetime Emmy Award nominations for Best Cinematography and Best Sound Editing. The biggest difference between the film and the novel is that in the movie, Lillian Jean, Jeremy, R.W., and Melvin are Kaleb Wallace's children, while in the book, they are the children of Charlie Simms, a character who does not exist in the movie.

Awards
Preceded by The Grey King	Newbery Medal recipient 1977	Succeeded by Bridge to Terabithia
