= Graven Images (book) =

1982 book by Paul Fleischman

- First edition
- Author: Paul Fleischman
- Illustrator: Andrew Glass
- Language: English
- Genre: Children fiction
- Published: 1982
- Publisher: Harper & Row
- Publication place: USA
- Media type: Print (hardback)
- Pages: 85
- ISBN: 978-0-7636-2775-1
- OCLC: 8409245

Graven Images: 3 stories is a 1982 children's book written by Paul Fleischman that was awarded a Newbery Honor in 1983.

== Synopsis ==
The book is a collection of three supernatural-themed stories that all revolve around statues. In the first, titled "Binnacle Boy," a statue of a sailor boy on the deck of a boat is the only witness to the deaths of the entire ship's crew. "St. Crispin's Follower" is a comedy about a shoemaker's apprentice and his hopeless love for the town beauty. The final story is called "The Man of Influence." It tells the story of a starving artist who agrees to a job commissioned by a ghost.

== Publication history ==
- 1982, USA, Harper & Row, ISBN 978-0-06-021907-9, Pub date 1982, illustrator Andrew Glass, Hardback, 85 pages
- 2006, USA, Candlewick Press, ISBN 978-0-7636-2775-1, Pub date 2006, illustrator Bagram Ibatoulline, Hardback, 116 pages
- 2007, USA, Listening Library, ISBN 978-0-307-28408-2, Pub date 2006, Audiobook on CD

== Reception ==
The University of New Orleans found "Fleischman has blended the styles of these authors to create an intriguing read." while The School Library Journal review of the audiobook edition wrote "Three tales of the supernatural are rejuvenated in this spellbinding performance of Newbery Medalist Paul Fleischman's 1982 novel that is now back in print (Candlewick, 2006)." and "Older readers who have moved beyond Alvin Schwartz's Scary Stories will find more than enough spooky thrills in this fascinating audio production."

Graven Images appears on school and public library reading lists and is studied in the classroom.
