= Weslandia =

1999 book by Paul Fleischman

- Author: Paul Fleischman
- Illustrator: Kevin Hawkes
- Language: English
- Series: 1
- Genre: Juvenile Fiction
- Publisher: Walker Books/Candlewick Press (UK/USA)
- Publication date: May 1999
- Publication place: United States
- Media type: Print (hardback & paperback)
- Pages: 40
- ISBN: 978-0-613-63531-8 (hardcover), ISBN 978-0-606-25987-3 (paperback)

Weslandia is a children's book by Newbery Medal winner Paul Fleischman, with illustrations by Kevin Hawkes. It was published in 1999 by Candlewick Press.

== Plot overview ==
When Wesley, a somewhat eccentric boy with no friends, discovers a mysterious plant magically growing in his parents' backyard, he cultivates the plant over his summer vacation. The plant, which he names "swist", provides him with a food source, and allows him to build shelter, tools, and even create his own entertainment and inspires Wesley to create his own writing system. Wesley's resourcefulness and meticulous research eventually allow to him the basis of his own civilization which he names "Weslandia", an eponymous micro-nation in his parents' backyard. His efforts are successful, and instead of being a social outcast, he gains a group of followers made up of his former grade-school tormentors.

== Reviews and reception ==
The book has been described by Cyndi Giorgis as a satire that emphasizes the protagonists "vivid world and the mundane uniformity of those around him". The art in the book has been described by "splendid" by Shirley Lewis. This Book was awarded the Silver Honor by Parents' Choice Foundation. In 2000 it was also listed as the Notable Children's Books award winner.

== Film adaptation ==
In December 2023, it was announced that Radar Pictures and Bandits Roost Entertainment would develop a live-action film adaptation of Weslandia with Kenny Ortega attached to direct and Shawn DeLoache writing the script while Ted Field, Anthony Tringali, Michael Napoliello, Maria Frisk, Cori Silberman, and Michael Dovid would produce.
