= Let the Circle Be Unbroken =

1981 novel by Mildred D. Taylor

Let The Circle Be Unbroken
- First edition
- Author: Mildred D. Taylor
- Illustrator: Danielle Gray
- Cover artist: Jerry Pinkney
- Language: English
- Genre: Historical novel
- Publisher: Dial Press (Now Penguin Group)
- Publication date: 1981
- Publication place: United States
- Media type: Print (hardback, paperback)
- Pages: 394 pp
- Awards: 1982 Coretta Scott King Author Award
- ISBN: 0812409345
- Preceded by: Roll of Thunder, Hear My Cry
- Followed by: The Gold Cadillac

Let The Circle Be Unbroken is a 1981 historical children's novel by Mildred D. Taylor. A sequel to Roll of Thunder, Hear My Cry (1976), the book is set in Mississippi in 1935, and continues the saga of the African-American Logan family as they struggle to make a living during the Great Depression. Several trials and tribulations are faced by the family told from the perspective of the African-American experience, including issues of racism in the criminal justice system, interracial marriage, "passing", and poverty. Ultimately, the novel emphasizes themes of self-respect, hard work, and pride. It won the Coretta Scott King Author Award in 1982. A recording by Lynne Thigpen was named to the 1996 ALA Notable Children's Recordings list.

== Plot summary ==
The Logan family endures a difficult time. T.J. Avery, the friend of their eldest son Stacey; is accused of murdering a white man, Jim Lee Barnett. Although he is innocent, he is tried by an all-white jury and convicted of murder. T.J. is sentenced to death.

The Logan's cousin Suzella comes to stay. Suzella is venerated for being attractive and mixed. Suzella struggles with identity issues that put a strain on her relationships with others. She catches the eye of Stuart Walker, a white boy who flirts with pretty black girls to start trouble.

Meanwhile, a local man makes a file to join blacks and whites together so the cotton fields can be shared. The union does not succeed and the man who wanted to start it is beaten. Some of the locals are told that they need to pull up acres of cotton that were planted because they planted too much. The white landowners lied, claiming the government ordered it, but the landowners did it in order to receive money that was supposed to go to the sharecroppers.

The financial worries affect Stacey; he believes he must take care of his family before they lose their land. He and his best friend Moe plan to run away to a sugarcane field to work.

With the help of Mr. Jamison, a white lawyer; Mama, Papa and Caroline Logan (Big Ma) contact police stations in the next couple of towns. Seven months later, they find Stacey several hours away, injured and jailed in a small town in Louisiana. Stacey and Moe were accused of stealing and imprisoned. The Logans are able to rescue them and bring them home.

== Characters ==
=== The Logan Family ===
- Cassie Logan: The Logans' strong-willed daughter. She is ten years old. The story is mainly told from her point of view.
- Stacey Logan: The Logans' eldest son. He is aged 13. He is portrayed as strong-minded and loving towards his family.
- Christopher-John Logan: Stacey and Cassie's younger brother. He is being a rule follower and doesn't like getting in trouble.
- Clayton Chester "Little Man" Logan: Stacey and Cassie's youngest brother. He is very tidy.
- David Logan: The father of the Logan children, known as Papa. He worked on the railroad.
- Mary Logan: The mother in the Logan family. She used to be a school teacher, but now she organizes groups to change society.
- Caroline "Big Ma" Logan: She is the grandmother of the Logan children. She is portrayed as a strong and good-natured woman. Caroline Logan has influenced Cassie Logan by passing on the family stories and history to her. She is a healer.
- Hammer Logan: David Logan's older brother and Cassie's uncle. He lives in Chicago because of the racism in Mississippi.

=== Other characters ===
- Suzella Rankin: Cousin of the Logan family children.
- T.J. Avery: A friend of the Logan children. He gets put on trial for a murder committed by the Simms brothers and is convicted for the murder although he is innocent.
- Jeremy Simms: A white teenager who is friends with the Logan children.
- Mr. Wade Jamison: A white lawyer that supports the Logans and other black families in their town. He tried to defend T.J. at his trial.
- Cousin Bud: The father of Suzella and married to a white woman. He is also Mary's (Mama's) nephew.
- Lottie: She is the sister of Mary Logan.
- Lee Annie: An elderly black woman that had an urge to learn about the history of the U.S. and go and register to vote. Ms. Lee Annie is like family to the Logans.
- Mr. Morrison: A member of the Logan family after he was fired from his job. His family died when he was young.
- Moe Turner: A sharecropper and has his cotton plowed. He also ran away with Stacy to go work at the sugarcane fields.
- Harlan Granger: A white landowner who makes life difficult for the sharecroppers.
- The Barnetts: A couple that owns a store in Strawberry that people shop at. Jim Lee, the husband, is killed in a robbery by the Simms brothers. Mrs. Barnett accuses T.J. of the murder because he was the only unmasked character in the crime.
- Mr. Farnsworth: A government agent that tells the Turners that he must plow up their cotton.
- Sheriff Dobbs: The sheriff of a town in Louisiana. He helps the Logans locate Stacey when he runs away.
- The Averys: T.J.'s family including his father, Joe, his mother, his younger brother Claude, and his two sisters. Friends with the Logan's.
