= Out of My Mind (film) =

2024 film by Amber Sealey

- Release poster
- Directed by: Amber Sealey
- Screenplay by: Daniel Stiepleman
- Based on: Out of My Mind by Sharon M. Draper
- Produced by: Dan Angel; Peter Saraf; Robert Kessel; Michael B. Clark; Eddie Rubin; Brian Gott; Leah Holzer; Jeff Skoll
- Starring: Phoebe-Rae Taylor; Rosemarie DeWitt; Luke Kirby; Judith Light; Jennifer Aniston
- Cinematography: Noah Greenberg
- Edited by: Jacob Craycroft
- Music by: Linda Perry
- Production companies: Disney Branded Television; Big Beach; Participant; Reunion Pacific Entertainment; EveryWhere Studios
- Distributed by: Disney+
- Release dates: January 19, 2024 (Sundance); November 22, 2024 (United States)
- Running time: 102 minutes
- Country: United States
- Language: English

Out of My Mind is a 2024 American coming-of-age drama film based on the 2010 novel of the same name by Sharon M. Draper. It is directed by Amber Sealey and written by Daniel Stiepleman. The film stars Phoebe-Rae Taylor (in her screen debut), Rosemarie DeWitt, Luke Kirby, Judith Light, and Jennifer Aniston.

The film premiered at the 2024 Sundance Film Festival on January 19, 2024, and was released on Disney+ on November 22, 2024. The film also won a Peabody Award.

== Plot ==
The film is set in 2002. Melody Brooks is a sixth-grader in middle school with cerebral palsy, synesthesia, and a photographic memory. She is mostly nonverbal and uses an electric wheelchair. While she is unable to speak, her internal thoughts are rendered in the voice of Jennifer Aniston, due to her favorite TV show being Friends. She has a younger sister named Penny and is constantly watched after by her parents Chuck and Diane, the former of whom believes Melody deserves a better education due to her very obvious intelligence.

Chuck and Diane meet Dr. Katherine Ray, a post-doctoral fellow with a Ph.D. in education, who offers the opportunity for Melody to be mainstreamed. This program would allow Melody to spend some time each day in a regular sixth grade class, as opposed to being only in her mixed-grade special education class. Diane is reluctant to allow it, but Chuck convinces her to have her enrolled.

Melody is sent to Mr. Dimming's class, where she is met with rude comments from both the other students and Mr. Dimming himself. Despite showcasing her intelligence by correctly answering Mr. Dimming's questions, he and the students continue to underestimate her abilities. The only classmate who talks directly to Melody politely—albeit stiffly—is Rose Spencer. Their friendship starts off incredibly one-sided, especially after Melody invites Rose to the museum. Rose becomes distracted by her other friends while Melody, feeling left out, wanders off on her own. Chuck and Diane decide to apply for a Medi-Talker and Melody is able to speak with an electronic voice, which she happily uses to her heart's content.

When Mr. Dimming announces the Whiz Kids student competition, Melody convinces Rose to study with her after revealing that her Medi-Talker has a trivia game that can help them study. The girls bond for the first time. After taking the test, the students chosen to represent their school are announced. While Rose makes it, Melody does not, causing Chuck, Diane, and Dr. Ray to become suspicious. They learn that not only did Melody get 100% correct on the test, but Mr. Dimming chose to not even grade it. Principal Antenucci is upset that Mr. Dimming's reputation is tarnished and Dr. Ray realizes that she has no concern for helping students like Melody. Melody joins the team, but Rose is forced into alternate, greatly upsetting her.

The students go the Whiz Kids competition where Melody shines through, winning for the team. Afterwards, the group celebrates without Melody due to how she needs support when eating. At the last minute, Mr. Dimming is informed that their initial flight to Washington has been cancelled and that their replacement flight moved up, forcing everyone to hurry to the airport. Due to Melody not being with them, she is informed last and with an elevator in the airport being out of order, she misses the flight. Out of anger, Melody floods her Medi-Talk with a milkshake. As Diane reprimands Melody in the car, she fails to see Penny playing in the driveway and hits her. Penny survives, but is hospitalized. Diane admits to Melody that she has been messing up more than Melody and that Melody is not to blame for recent events.

The Whiz Kids team return from their trip to Washington, having lost. Melody arrives with her parents to the class to finally make her peace with the help of her Medi-Talk. She confronts everyone for not treating her with respect and for pitying her and that she is not looking for them to not just treat her better, but to acknowledge her and actually listen to her. Her words move Mr. Dimming and the class and she is welcomed back with open arms. As she finishes her inner thoughts, her Jennifer Aniston voice switches to her Medi-Talk voice, implying that she now embraces herself for who she is.

During the credits, Melody thanks Jennifer Aniston for allowing her to "borrow" her voice.

== Cast ==
- Phoebe-Rae Taylor as Melody Brooks
  - Jennifer Aniston as Melody's Inner Voice
  - Margot Thomas as Medi-Talker Voice
- Rosemarie DeWitt as Diane Brooks, Melody's mother
- Luke Kirby as Chuck Brooks, Melody's father
- Michael Chernus as Mr. Dimming
- Courtney Taylor as Dr. Katherine Ray
- Judith Light as Mrs. V.
- Emily Mitchell as Penny Brooks, Melody's younger sister
- Pip McCallan as Maria
- Maria Nash as Rose Spencer
- Gavin MacIver-Wright as Rodney Walsh
- Ian Ho as Connor Bates
- Kate Moyer as Claire West
- Sharron Matthews as Mrs. Anastasia Billups
- Catherine McNally as Principal Antenucci
- Kevin Jubinville as Len "The King" Kingsley

== Production ==
In April 2015, it was reported that a film adaptation of Sharon Draper's novel Out of My Mind was in development at EveryWhere Studios and Gotham Group. In May 2022, it was reported that the film was in development for Disney+ by Disney Branded Television with Daniel Stiepleman as screenwriter, Amber Sealey as director and Phoebe-Rae Taylor set to star. In July 2022, Rosemarie DeWitt, Luke Kirby and Judith Light were cast in the leading roles alongside Taylor. Production began in Toronto later that month. It is one of the last films to be produced by Participant before the company was shuttered on April 16, 2024.

== Release ==
The film premiered in the Family Matinee section at the 2024 Sundance Film Festival, on January 19, 2024, where it received two standing ovations from the audience. This was followed by its New York premiere at the Marlene Meyerson JCC Manhattan on November 19, 2024, presented by ReelAbilities. It was released on Disney+ on November 22, 2024.

== Reception ==
On the review aggregator website Rotten Tomatoes, 100% of 13 critics' reviews are positive, with an average rating of 7.6/10. Metacritic, which uses a weighted average, assigned the film a score of 73 out of 100, based on four critics, indicating "generally favorable" reviews.

=== Accolades ===
Year	Award	Category	Nominee(s)	Result	Ref
2025	Academy of Television Arts & Sciences	Television Academy Honors Award	Big Beach, Participant, EveryWhere Studios LLC, and Disney Branded Television	Won	
2025	Peabody Awards	Children's/Youth	Big Beach, Participant, EveryWhere Studios LLC, and Disney Branded Television	Won	
