= Darkness Before Dawn =

2001 young adult novel by Sharon M. Draper

- First edition
- Author: Sharon M. Draper
- Language: English
- Series: Hazelwood High Trilogy
- Subject: Date rape
- Genre: Realistic fiction
- Publisher: Atheneum Books
- Publication date: 1 Feb 2001
- Publication place: United States
- Media type: Print-
- Pages: 272 pp
- ISBN: 0-689-83080-7
- Preceded by: Forged by Fire

Darkness Before Dawn is a realistic young adult novel written by author Sharon M. Draper in 2001. The novel is the third and final installment in the Hazelwood High Trilogy. It depicts the story of an eighteen-year-old African American senior Keisha Montgomery, who is attracted to the twenty-three-year-old track coach Jonathan Hathaway.

== Plot summary ==
Eighteen-year-old Keisha Montgomery is still recovering from the suicide of her ex-boyfriend, Andy, after she broke up with him. While having the support of her friends and family, she starts to go out. She joins the track team and there meets Jonathan Hathaway, the twenty-three-year-old coach, and principal's son. During a track meeting, a girl named Rita begins arguing with Jonathan. He denies what they were talking about and after shouting some choice curse words, she runs into the woods, never to return to school.

Over time, he begins to smooth talk her and they finally become a couple. Her parents disapprove of him being five years older and forbid her to see him. Against their wishes, she continues to see him discreetly. Her friends attempt to warn her about his true ways but she refuses to listen to them. Leon Hawkins, a friend with feelings for Keisha, also tries to warn her.

Ignoring everyone's warnings, she uses Leon to cover up her tracks when Jonathan asks her to the Valentine's dance. After the dance, Jonathan takes Keisha to his apartment and he attempts to engage in a sexual moment with her. After seeing her refusal to 'cooperate', Jonathan attempts to force her with a knife. Keisha cuts him and eventually manages to escape. She seeks the help of a homeless woman named Edna who sees her running in the snow. She takes Keisha in and gives Keisha a phone to call her parents.

Finally safe in her home, she tells her parents her experience and apologizes sincerely. She also notes her refusal to attend school, as she feels ashamed. After two weeks of absences, Rita comes back and tells her she has experienced some of the same things as Keisha but she did not escape. Mr. Hathaway resigns as the principal, and one of Jonathan's other victims presses charges, resulting in him getting a thirty-year prison sentence. Feeling relieved that Jonathan is in jail, she returns to school and Keisha graduates with the rest of her friends.

== Characters ==
- Keisha Montgomery- the main protagonist of the story, who is upset about her ex-boyfriend Andy's suicide and spends time with Jonathan Hathaway, but he attacks her later.
- Jalani- a transfer student from New York and nice friend of Keisha and Rhonda. She cares a lot about Gerald
- Rhonda - Keisha's best friend who is there for her throughout the story. She and Tyrone enjoy being together
- Tyrone - Rhonda's boyfriend who is really close to her
- B.J. Carson- Tyrone's best friend, who is short and wants to be a preacher
- Gerald - another one of Keisha's friends who takes an interest to Jalani
- Angel - Gerald's younger sister, who is a freshman and a dancer. She passed out during dance class because she does not eat much
- Kiara Joyelle Leila Victoria Washington- Rob Washington's fourteen-year-old sister and Angel's best friend, another freshmen. She decided to change her name from Kiara to Joyelle after Andy's funeral because she missed him and Rob so much
- Monty - Andy's seven-year-old younger brother, who is also upset about his death, but still has fun with Keisha and her friends
- Leon Hawkins- Keisha's classmate who is a real prankster, and has feelings for her, and considers her a close friend
- Rita Bronson- a girl who was attacked by Jonathan Hathaway like Keisha. She was on the track team and disappeared after her fight with Jonathan during practice
- Jonathan Hathaway- the 23 year old track coach and principal's son, who is very attractive to Keisha and attacks her with a knife in the middle of the story

== Reception ==
- 2002 Top 10 Young Adult Library Services Association Quick Picks for Reluctant Young Adult Readers

Kirkus Reviews wrote "This series appears to be an attempt to carve out a niche of the high-school problem-novel market for African-American teens; it’s a pity this offering only complements the banality so often found in this genre."
