= Double Dutch (jump rope) =

Game involving two jump ropes

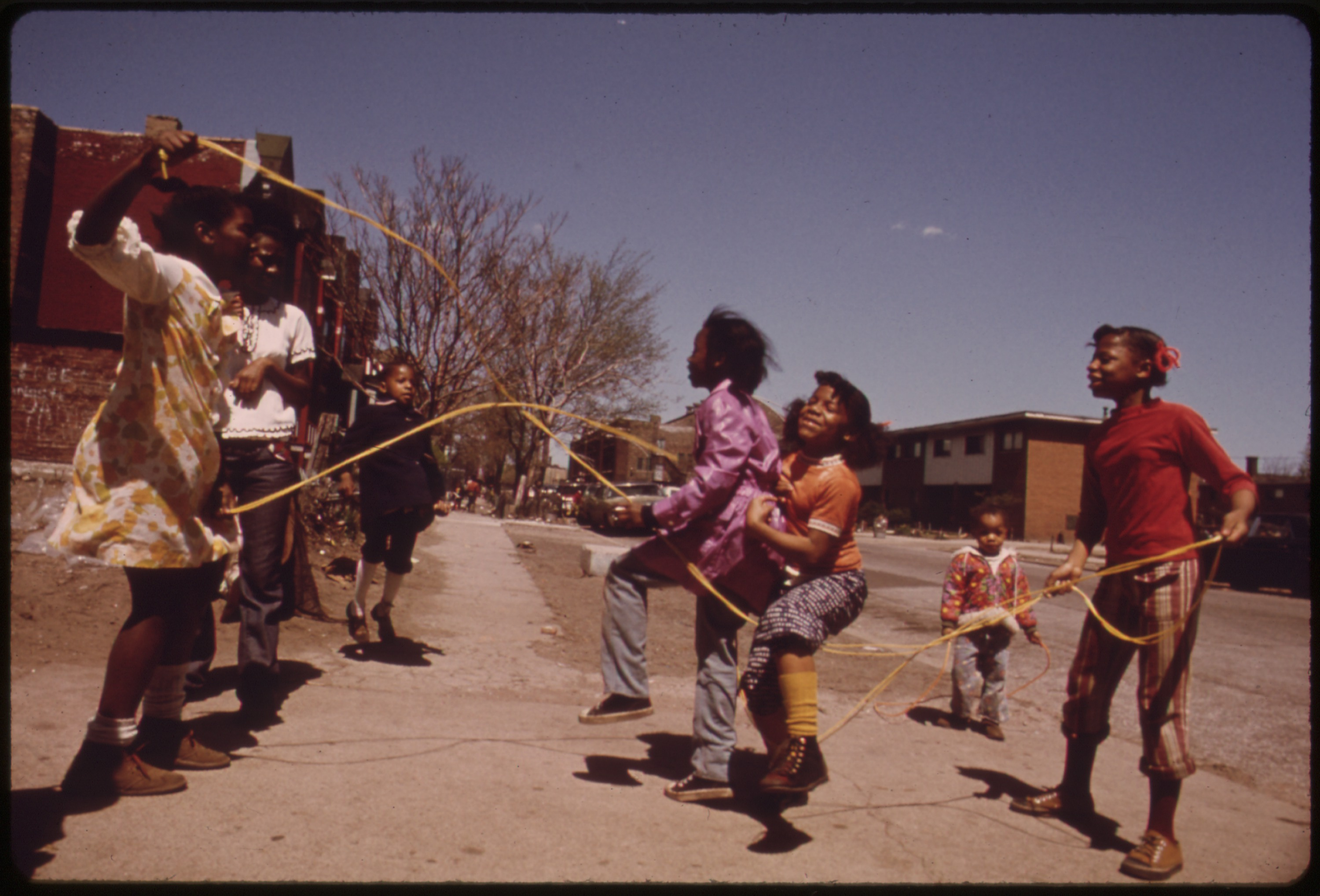
Girls playing Double Dutch outside the Ida B. Wells Homes in Chicago, 1973

Double Dutch is a game in which two long jump ropes turning in opposite directions are jumped by one or more players jumping simultaneously.

Jump rope games have been traced back to Ancient Egypt and China, eventually making its way to Europe. The Dutch are credited with bringing it to North America in the 1600s, with one of the games evolving into “Double Dutch.” Girls were particularly attracted to it with jumping becoming easier once they began to wear pantaloons in the 1800s. In the early to mid-20th Century, it became popular in working class and immigrant urban communities from a variety of ethnic backgrounds.

It is widely acknowledged that modern, competitive Double Dutch originated in the United States among girls in predominantly Black urban communities during the 1940s and 1950s, who congregated on street corners to display new tricks and repurposed clotheslines as ropes. While it had long been a popular street activity for African American girls in New York City, the rules of the sport were formalized in the early 1970s by NYPD officers Ulysses Williams and David Walker. The first official competition was held in 1974. Competitions in Double Dutch range from block parties to the world level. During the spring of 2009, Double Dutch became a varsity sport in New York City public high schools. In the early 1980s, Double Dutch was strongly associated with New York hip hop culture. It has also been recognized as an element of the genre by notable MCs such as KRS-One.

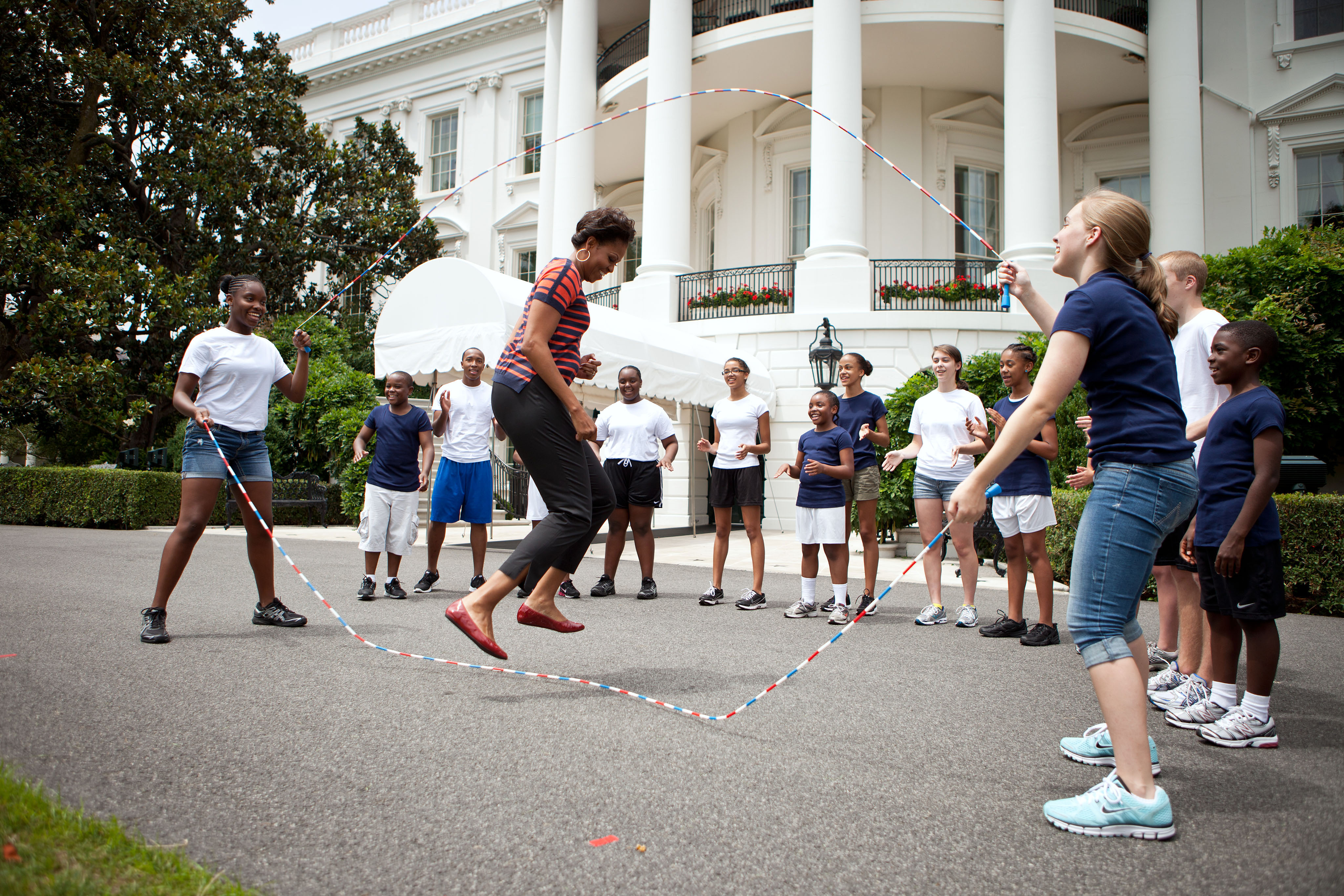
Michelle Obama in front of the White House

Although it is popularly claimed the activity was brought to America by Dutch settlers, the term "double Dutch" itself has long existed in English slang, where it originally referred to incomprehensible speech or nonsense, reflecting historical English views of the Dutch language as confusing or strange. Phrases such as "in Dutch", meaning to be in trouble, further illustrate this pejorative connotation. The use of the term "double Dutch" for the game reflects the visual complexity and perceived challenge of the jump-roping, similar to the confusion implied by the idiom.

== Technique ==
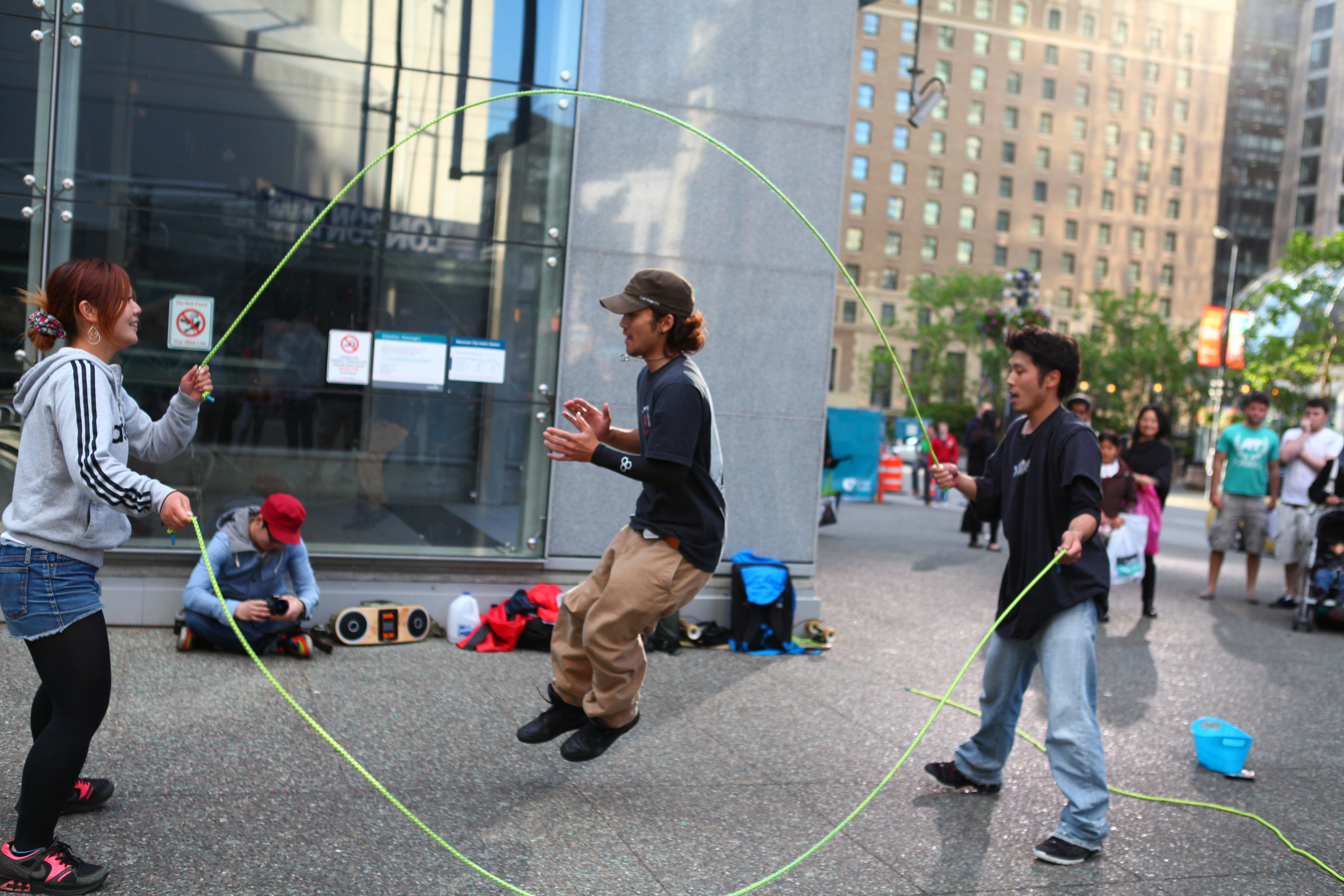
Double Dutch performance in Vancouver

Playing Double Dutch involves at least three people: one or more jumping, and two turning the 3.5 m-long (11.5 ft) ropes (according to the American standard). A jumper usually performs tricks that may involve gymnastics or breakdance and may also incorporate fancy foot movements. Based on the "WJRF Judging Handbook" 2019 edition, some of the key elements of Double Dutch include multiples, power, gymnastics, turner involvement, releases, switches and footwork.

== Competitive play ==
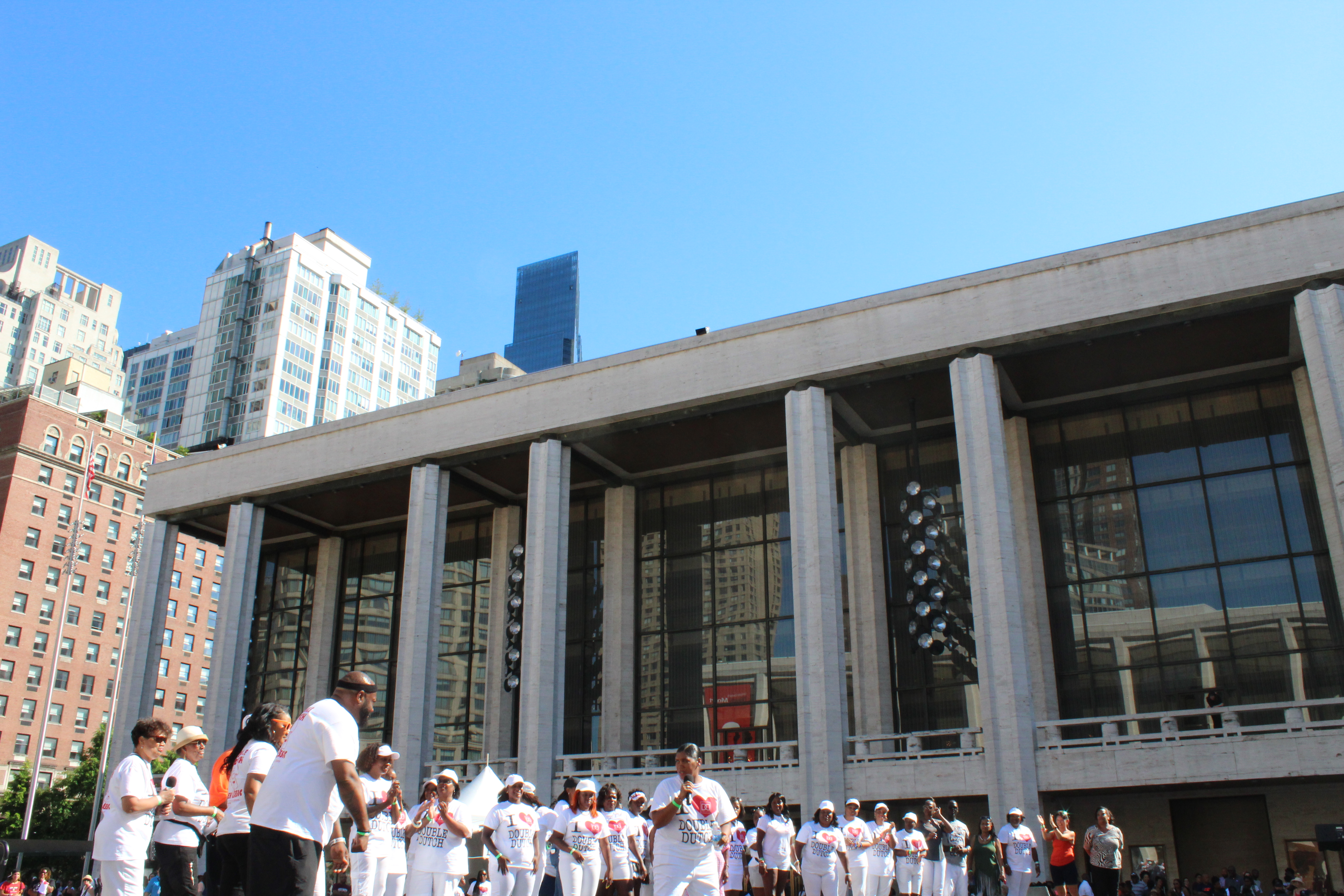
Legends Of National Double League gather at the Lincoln Center.

The National Double Dutch League (NDDL) holds yearly camps and a Holiday Classic, in which teams from all over the world compete. NDDL was founded in the 1970's by David A. Walker, who had been a police sergeant in Harlem. NDDL has been holding its annual Holiday Classic Official Double Dutch Sport & Fusion Freestyle Competition since 1992. The 30th Anniversary Holiday Classic was held in Harlem's Apollo Theater in December 2021.

Double Dutch is also an integral part of jump rope tournaments in the US, as well as the AAU Junior Olympic Games and the World Jump Rope Federation's worldwide annual competitions.

The World Jump Rope Championships were held in July, 2012, at George Washington University, in Washington D.C.

Double Dutch competitions are categorized as compulsory, freestyle, and speed rope.

== In France ==
Double Dutch is associated with early French hip-hop scenes. It was introduced in late 1982 when the World Champion Fantastic Four Double Dutch team came to France alongside the New York City Rap Tour. Groups such as the Dutch Force System were some of the better-known Double Dutch groups. Double Dutch was seen as "the symbol of a strong and affirmed femininity in hip-hop".

== In popular culture ==
The 1981 single "Double Dutch Bus" by Frankie Smith features African American girls playing this game in the video clip of the song.

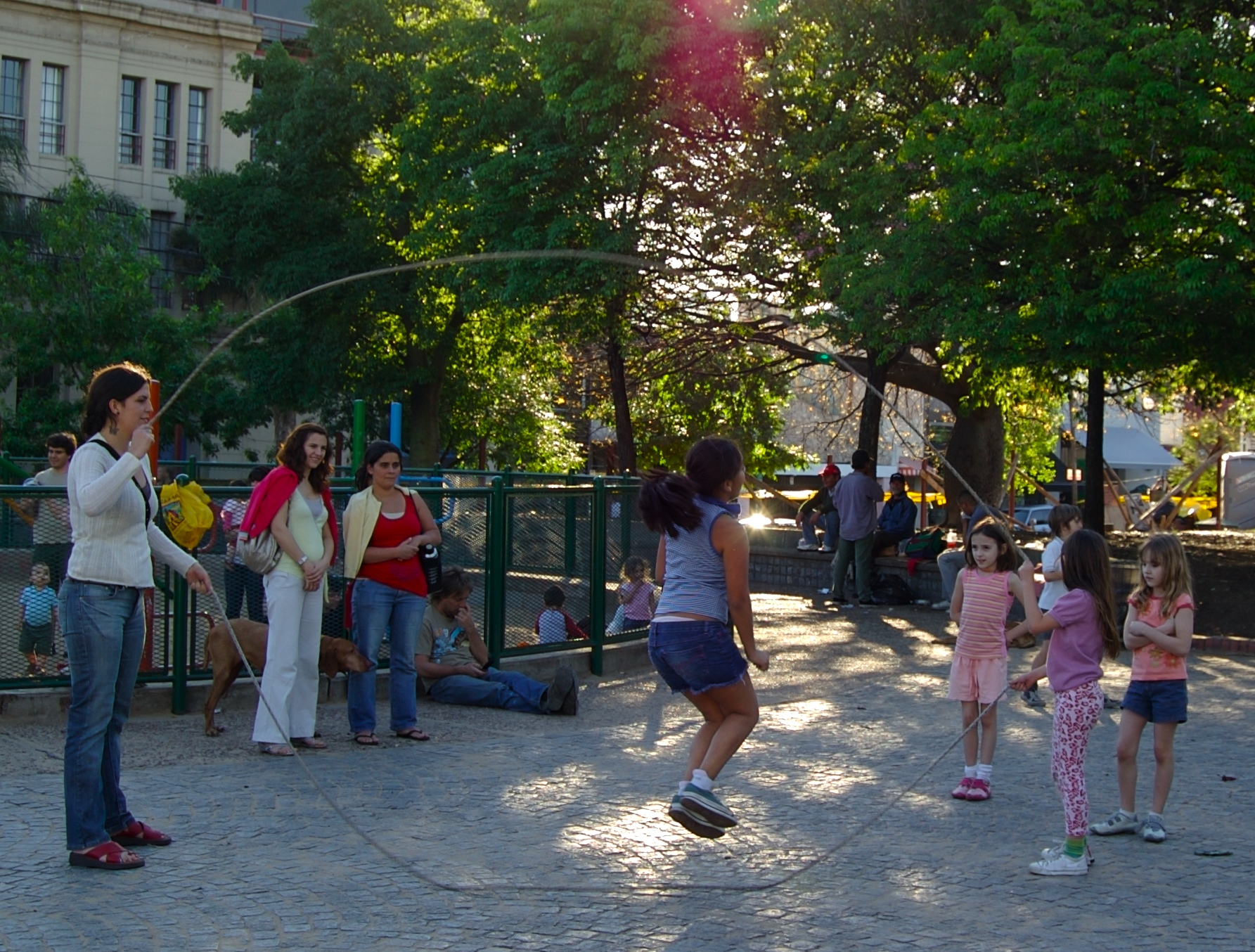
Children playing double Dutch in Buenos Aires

The 1983 single by Malcolm McLaren "Double Dutch" features a number of New York City troupes. It is taken from his debut album Duck Rock.

In the opening credits of the American sitcom Amen, Deacon Frye (Sherman Hemsley) jumps into a Double Dutch game before going into the church.

Doubletime, a documentary from Discovery Films, tells the story of the historic meet-up of rope skipping and Double Dutch. The film follows two top teams, the Bouncing Bulldogs and the Double Dutch Forces, as they train to compete against each other for the first time. The competition took place at the Apollo Theater in Harlem.

The 2002 novel Double Dutch by Sharon M. Draper features a teenager competing in the Double Dutch world championships.

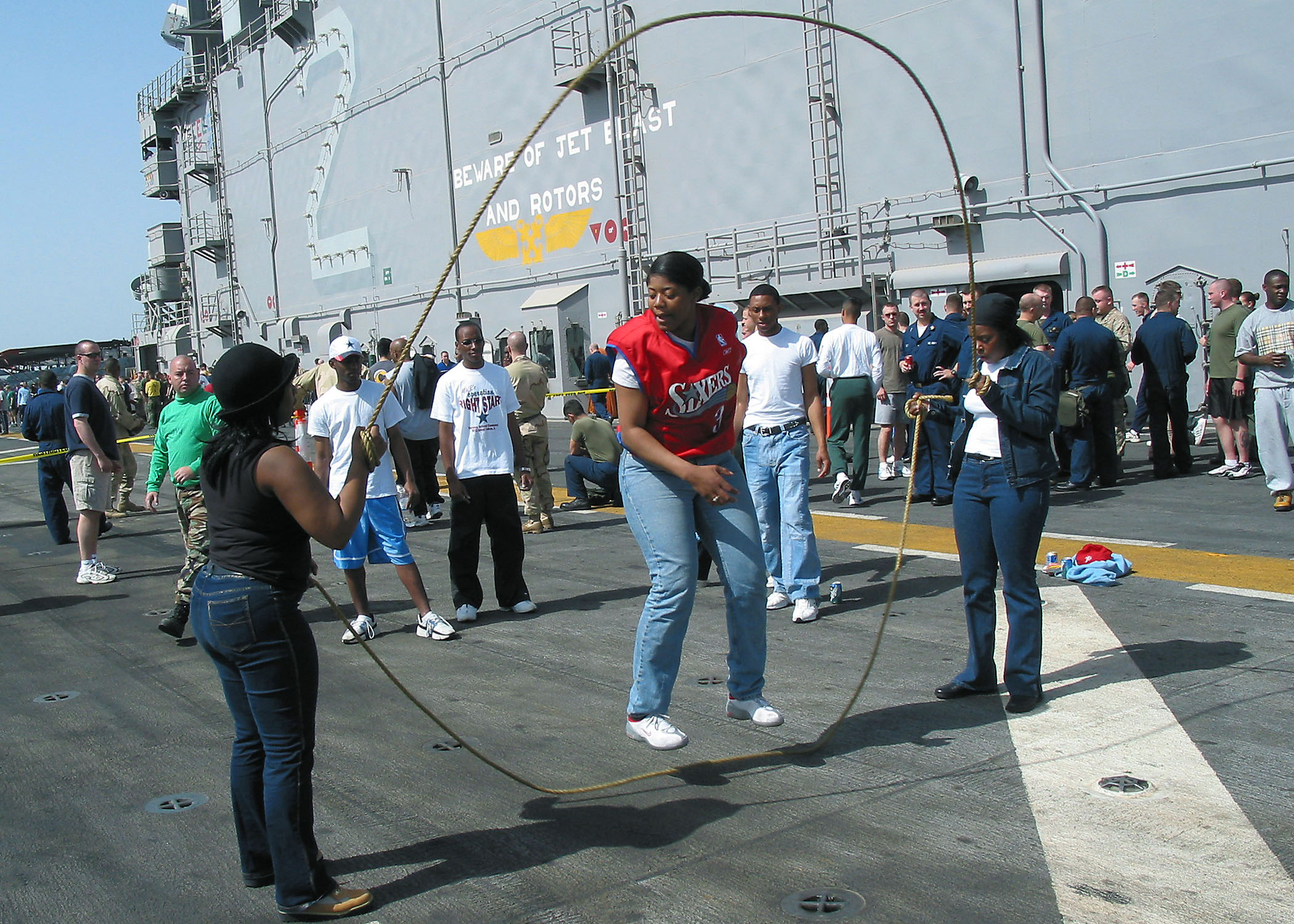
US sailors and Marines participate in a double Dutch contest on the deck of the USS Saipan during a ship celebration.

In 2005, Elizabeth Verity, also known as Double Dutch Girl, exhibited her technique around the United States, raising money for the United States military. Double Dutch Girl jumped rope in St. Louis, Chicago, Washington and several small towns throughout the Midwest. Ultimately, her goal is to jump rope in all 50 states.

The 2007 Disney Channel original movie Jump In! features Double Dutch as the central element of its plot.

In 2010, Saltare was on season 5 of MTV's America's Best Dance Crew and the group featured single rope and Double Dutch into their dance routines.

A 2010 PBS documentary, New York Street Games, included Whoopi Goldberg describing Double Dutch.

On January 15, 2007, in honor of Martin Luther King Jr. Day, the Google homepage featured a double Dutch logo with black children playing with white and Asian children, emblematic of the realization of Martin Luther King Jr.'s "I Have A Dream" speech in 1963.

Double Dutch is featured in the Wee Sing production Grandpa's Magical Toys.

In his dual title role of the 2011 film Jack & Jill, Adam Sandler gives a demonstration of Double Dutch jump rope on board the cruise liner.
