= The Three Doctors =

The Three Doctors may refer to:

- The Three Doctors (Doctor Who), a 1973 serial in the British science fiction television series Doctor Who
- The Three Doctors (motivational speakers), a group of motivational speakers, authors, and physicians
- Three Doctors (band), a musical group led by Gregg Turkington
