= The Battle of Jericho (novel) =

2003 young adult novel by Sharon M. Draper

- First edition
- Author: Sharon M. Draper
- Language: English
- Series: Jericho Trilogy
- Genre: Realistic fiction
- Publisher: Atheneum Books
- Publication date: January 28, 2003
- Publication place: United States
- Media type: Print
- Pages: 352
- ISBN: 0-689-84232-5
- Followed by: November Blues

The Battle of Jericho by Sharon M. Draper is a young adult novel. It's the first book in the Jericho Trilogy. The book is set in high school and deals with the issues of peer pressure, acceptance, discrimination, sexual tension, and social interaction.

== Plot summary ==
The story takes place at Frederick Douglass High School. Junior Jericho Prescott and his cousin Josh, along with their friends Dana Wolfe and Kofi Freeman, decide to pledge for one of the most popular and prestigious organizations at school, the Warriors of Distinction. While the "Warriors" seem to be an upstanding organization that does a lot for the community, their governing is far more corrupt and plagued. Eddie Mahoney, the pledge master, sends the group through unnecessarily cruel tricks and task to humiliate and degrade them as they pledge for membership. From eating worms to being paddled, Dana receives the most harassment which crosses the line of sexual harassment. While they have the opportunity to quit, Josh and Jericho choose popularity and peer acceptance and it ends in a hazing accident gone wrong which cost Josh's life.

== Characters ==
- Jericho Prescott: Main character
- Josh Prescott: Jericho's cousin and best friend
- Kofi Freeman: Jericho's friend and Dana's boyfriend
- Arielle Gresham: Jericho's girlfriend
- Dana Wolfe: Kofi's girlfriend and Arielle and November's friend
- November Nelson: Josh's girlfriend and Arielle and Dana's friend
- Eddie Mahoney: Pledge master and main antagonist
- Eric Bell: Jericho's classmate
- Mr. Tambori: Jericho's music teacher
- Mr. Zucker: School principal
- Brock Prescott: Josh's father
- Cedric Prescott: Jericho's father
- Geneva: Jericho's stepmother
- Mr. Boston: Jericho's teacher
- Mr. Culligan: Faculty sponsor the Warriors of Distinction

== Awards ==
This book has been critically acclaimed for tackling the issues of hazing, peer-pressure, sexual tension, and other social teen issues.

- 2004 Coretta Scott King Honor Book
- New York Public Library's Book for the Teen Age
- 2005 Young Adult Choice Books—International Reading Association
