= We Beat the Street =

Book by The Three Doctors

- Author: Sampson Davis, George Jenkins, Rameck Hunt, Sharon Draper
- Publication date: April 20, 2006
- ISBN: 9780142406274

We Beat the Street: How a Friendship Pact Led to Success is an American autobiography aimed at young adults written by The Three Doctors and Sharon M. Draper on April 21, 2005. The novel shares the experiences of Dr. Sampson Davis, Rameck Hunt, and George Jenkins as well as other professional authors.

We Beat the Street is the second novel that The Three Doctors were involved in writing, following the 2002 book The Pact and preceding the 2007 book The Bond.

== Reception ==
We Beat the Street was a New York Times children's bestseller for the week ending June 25, 2005. The same year, the Association of Indiana School Library Educators selected the book as a "Read-Aloud Too-Good-to-Miss". In 2006, the book was chosen as a "Notable Social Studies Trade Book for Young People" by the National Council for the Social Studies and Children's Book Council. The book review committee stated that the book contained a "true and inspiring" autobiographical account.

Vicki Sherbert from The ALAN Review felt that the authors "spoke honestly of their discouragement, failures, and successes" and "offer encouragement to kids who find themselves in hopeless situations." School Library Journal's Francisca Goldsmith thought that the writing was "simple and accessible", adding that "there is plenty of action for reluctant readers." Gillian Engberg wrote in Booklist that the book contained inspirational stories and "personal, intimate voices that frankly discuss big mistakes and complicated emotions".
