= Double Dutch (novel) =

2002 young adult novel by Sharon M. Draper

- First edition (publ. Atheneum Books)
- Author: Sharon M. Draper
- Language: English
- Publication date: 2002

Double Dutch is a 2002 young adult novel by Sharon M. Draper, published by Atheneum Books in June 2002. It focuses on two teenagers (Delia and Randy) and their very different struggles, which eventually collide and threaten their friendship.

== Plot ==
Delia is an eighth grader in Cincinnati, Ohio. She competes on a team in the Double Dutch world championships with her friends Yolanda and Charlene, and her friend Randy is the water boy. During school, they are told they might have to pass a standardized test in order to be on the team, which is ghastly news for Delia because she has dyslexia. No one knows Delia can't read properly except her best friend Yolanda.

But Randy has a problem too- his dad has been missing for over a month and his mom left them years ago. He is running out of money and food and starting to get scared, but he doesn't want to call the police for fear of getting placed in a foster home.

Meanwhile, the two mysterious school bullies, Tabu and Titan Tolliver appear on a TV show about terrible kids and say things that freak out the entire school. When a tornado hits their school during the Tollivers' English presentation and they disappear, the school is even more terrified. However, it turns out that they were just scared of the tornado and actually ended up rescuing Yolanda.

After an exciting competition, Delia sees a piece of paper with a picture of Randy's dad on it, but because she has reading disabilities, she doesn't tell Randy because she thinks it's from the police and he has been arrested. Randy, however, sees it while cleaning up and finds out that Delia saw it too. Randy is angry at Delia because she didn't tell him earlier, and the two both reveal their secrets to each other before Delia runs out of the gym.
