= Copper Sun =

2006 novel by Sharon Draper

- Official cover art
- Author: Sharon M. Draper
- Language: English
- Genre: Historical fiction
- Publisher: Atheneum Books
- Publication date: September 20, 2006
- Publication place: United States
- Awards: Coretta Scott King Award
- ISBN: 9781416953487

Copper Sun is a 2006 young adult novel by Coretta Scott King Award-winning author Sharon Draper.

== Background ==
When Draper traveled to Ghana, West Africa, she visited the Cape Coast Castle Point of No Return. The castles housed thousands of slaves that were kept before getting on the ship which was the main inspiration for this novel. Copper Sun addresses the Transatlantic Slave Trade, slavery in America, and freedom.

== Plot ==
Amari, a 15-year-old girl, is with Kwasi, her 8-year-old brother, in her village of Ziavi, Africa. Kwasi is in a coconut tree when Amari tells him to get down and bring some fruits to their mother. Kwasi teases Amari by saying he saw her promised to Besa, a drummer from their village. Amari then starts describing her village. She meets up with Besa, who is going to the elders of the village, claiming to have seen strangers who have "skin the color of goat’s milk.” She goes back to her family's home, uneasy. After talking with her mother about these people, they conclude that they must welcome these people, and start making preparations for their guests. The men arrive later, along with warriors from the Ashanti, a nearby tribe. After exchanging gifts, the village storyteller, Komla, who is Amari's own father, starts telling tales about the past. Then ceremonial dancing begins, to the beat of ceremonial drums.

Suddenly, one of the white men shoots the village chief with his gun. Fighting follows, with various villagers trying to escape, only to be killed by the white men. The Ashanti warriors that accompanied the men join them in capturing the villagers. Both of Amari's parents are killed, and later when she tries to escape with her brother, he is killed as well before she is shackled and brought back to the village. At daybreak, she discovers that only 24 villagers are alive, and all of them are like her, young and fairly healthy. Amari and the other villagers are then shackled in the neck to each other and are commanded by the white men to start walking. Several of the villagers die, some from wounds, others from simply losing the will to live. Amari, along with the surviving villagers and a few other groups of captives then arrive at Cape Coast, in what is nowadays Southern Ghana.

There, she is thrown into a prison with other women, having lost their families in the mass genocide, who were now hostile, where she befriends a lady called Afi. Afi, with no family of her own, treats Amari like her own daughter. Afi starts telling Amari of all the horrible things that await her. After a few days, all of the women are brought out of their mass cells and inspected by a thin, white man. Amari initially resists, but after being slapped in the face by the white man and hearing advice from Afi, she suffers while he probes her. Then, the women are bought by the thin white man and sent through a long, narrow tunnel in the side of the wall. Amari goes through and is then pulled up at the end of the tunnel.

She then looks out onto the sea for the first time, admiring how beautiful the sand is, and how vast the ocean is. She then sees the large freighter that the white men came in, and she likens it to a place of death. She is then brought to a fire, where she is branded and then thrown into another cell, with other people that have also been branded. She watches as several of the Ashanti, who had helped the white men in capturing Amari's village, among other villages, are also branded and then thrown into the cell. Besa was the last one to be thrown into the cell, and Amari briefly looks at him. They are given no water during the day, but at night, they are fed well, mainly to strengthen them for the journey, Afi tells Amari. Afi then tells Amari that they will never see Africa again. Amari then manages to sleep. At daybreak, the prisoners are fed more food, and medicine is applied to the spot where they were branded. Amari watches sadly as Besa, along with the men, are taken out of the cell. Afi advises Amari to forget about him, and when she asks why didn't Afi just leave her to die, she responds that she must survive to tell future generations their story.

The women were then led out by their captors, and Amari watches as the men are loaded into a small boat, and taken to the larger freighter. Amari, along with the other women are loaded into another waiting boat and then rowed across to the freighter. Amari watches as two women try to escape and jump off the boat, only to be consumed by two sharks. The women are then led aboard the freighter. They are pushed into the cargo hold aboard the freighter, which smells terrible due to the men urinating and defecating wherever they can. Once they are in the women's area of the hold, Afi starts humming an old funeral song in which eventually all of the women join in.

After several hours, the women are led out of the cargo hold, fed, and thrown saltwater on to roughly clean them. A white man then starts drumming on a barrel and tells them to "dance", jumping up and down. Amari notices one white man with orange-colored hair looking her directly at her face, not at her body, as the other white men are doing with the other women. The women are then chained to the deck, and Afi tells Amari that that night, they will be forced to have sex with the men. Then, the men are brought on deck, and go through the same procedure that the women go through. When the men finish, they are brought back down to the hold. At nightfall, the white men start choosing women to have sex with. The orange-haired man, whose name is Bill, comes to Amari and takes her to his room. He then tells her to scream, and after she does, he allowed her to sit and gives her water, then starts teaching her English.

After a couple of hours, he leads her back outside, gives her more water, and ties her gently to a mast, after which he leaves. Amari tells Afi that she was not raped, and Afi tells her that she was lucky this night, but that the next night, or the night after that, she will be taken. Afi then consoles Amari and hugs her. The next few nights, Amari is raped, and thrown back onto the deck. Bill occasionally rescues Amari from the other men and teaches her English. When they are close to arriving to their destination, the slaves are fed better and the doctor of the ship tends to them. When they arrive at Sullivan's Island, South Carolina, they are inspected and then brought to a prison, where they are told that they will stay there for 10 days to make sure they do not have any diseases, such as smallpox. Amari has a short reunion with Besa, before he is taken to another part of the prison.

After the quarantine, Amari and the other women are taken to a slave auction. They are all stripped, probed, fondled, and strapped to tables. On a deck to one side of the clearing is an indentured young woman named Polly, who thinks of the soon to be enslaved Africans as inferior. Mr. Derby, a large, noticeably greasy man buys Amari and Polly after auctioning with other plantation owners. Polly was bought because she had a 14-year long indenture because of the debt her parents didn't pay off. Mr. Derby also has a son named Clay, who disgusts both of the young women. Amari was bought as a "present" for Clay, and he gave her the name "Myna" to reinforce his ownership. Initially, tensions are high between Polly and Amari because of her prejudice. The wagon ride to Derbyshire Farms is very uncomfortable for Amari and Polly, who are belittled by Clay and Mr. Derby the few times they speak up.

Polly is shocked and upset when Mr. Derby informs her that her role is to “civilize” Amari. She had expected to serve in the house and learn to be a proper lady, but instead, she is assigned to a slave shack. As they settle in, Amari and Polly meet Teenie and Tidbit, the slave cook and her son, along with their dog, Hushpuppy. Teenie listens to Polly’s story: her father was an indentured servant who died from smallpox, along with her mother, leaving Polly with an extended indenture to repay her parents’ debts. Teenie reassures Polly that, one day, she will be free. As time passes, Amari learns English and assists Teenie in the kitchen. Teenie comforts Amari with a story about her own mother, who came from Africa. She tells Amari that as long as she remembers her African heritage and her parents, they will never be gone.

As Amari endures the brutal treatment of Clay, she becomes increasingly disheartened. After an especially cruel night, she considers ending her life but is persuaded by Teenie to stay strong. Teenie shows Amari a kente cloth that her mother managed to keep from Africa, telling her that the strength of her ancestors is always with her. A week later, while Amari, Polly, and Tidbit pick peaches for a pie, the two girls share a quiet conversation about what they have lost. Mrs. Derby, Mr. Derby’s second wife, is pregnant and kind-hearted, visiting Teenie’s kitchen daily to plan meals. However, Teenie continues to cook whatever she wants, refusing to bow to Mrs. Derby’s wishes. Mrs. Derby shows some compassion for Amari, once even apologizing for Clay’s behavior. Amari listens as Teenie and Lena, another house slave, discuss Mrs. Derby’s life. While Lena believes that Mrs. Derby has an idyllic existence, Teenie argues that she is almost like a slave, oppressed by Mr. Derby’s control. Mr. Derby married her for her youth, wealth, and the land she brought with her.

Polly, who still dreams of working in the house, begins to realize that it might soon become a reality. Teenie sends Polly, Amari, and Tidbit to the rice fields to deliver food and water to the slaves. At the fields, Cato, the oldest slave, tells them that Amari will end up working there once Clay tires of her, and that when Tidbit is older, he’ll be sent to the fields too. The conditions in the rice fields are horrific, with the threat of snakes, alligators, malaria, and cholera causing the death of most slaves within five years. Both Polly and Amari are horrified. Just as they are speaking, a woman named Hildy screams in pain; she has been bitten by a snake. The other slaves drag her to dry land, but they must quickly return to work. By night, Hildy dies.

Back at the kitchen, Teenie hatches a plan to protect Amari from being sent to the rice fields: one of the house slaves, Hildy’s daughter, is supposed to serve at dinner that evening, but Amari and Polly will take her place. Polly is thrilled at the prospect due to her dream to work in the house. However, during dinner, Polly realizes that Mrs. Derby’s life is not as easy as it seems. She is trapped in a marriage with a man who controls every aspect of her existence. After dinner, Mr. Derby trips Amari while she is serving a pie, causing it to spill all over the carpet. In a fit of rage, he whips Amari until Mrs. Derby intervenes. Amari spends the next three weeks recovering from the brutal beating. During this time, Polly, Teenie, and Mrs. Derby care for her. When she finally feels better, Amari attempts to lay low in the kitchen, fearing that Mr. Derby will send her to the fields after the pie incident. She begins to feel emotionally and physically drained, as if her spirit has been broken.

Things take a darker turn when Clay enters the kitchen one day and demands that Tidbit be brought to him to use as alligator bait. He forces Amari to come along as he shows her off to his friends, furthering the cruelty of her life at the plantation. A few weeks later, Mr. Derby bursts into the kitchen, panicking because Mrs. Derby is in labor and none of the house slaves are available to assist. He sends Amari and Polly to help her. Amari successfully delivers Mrs. Derby’s baby, but to everyone’s shock, the child is Black. Mrs. Derby begs Amari and Polly to save her baby, fearing that Mr. Derby will kill them all if he learns the truth. With Teenie’s help, the girls manage to get the baby to a slave woman named Sara Jane. They lie to Mr. Derby, telling him the baby was stillborn, but he demands an autopsy by a doctor. Polly rushes to meet Dr. Hoskins and Noah, the father of the child, but Dr. Hoskins refuses to turn around when she asks him to. When he arrives at the plantation, Mr. Derby realizes something is amiss. Meanwhile, Teenie discreetly informs Noah of the situation, and he reveals that he is in love with Mrs. Derby.

Mr. Derby, now furious, drags Mrs. Derby outside and forces her to watch as he shoots Noah and the baby. He locks Amari, Polly, Teenie, and Tidbit in the smokehouse, announcing his intention to sell them all. However, Cato, the oldest slave, shares a secret with them: Dr. Hoskins, who opposes slavery, plans to help them escape south to Fort Mose in Spanish Florida which was a free black settlement. He will allow them to flee the plantation, and in exchange, Teenie instructs him to poison Clay so he cannot accompany the doctor. Teenie gives Tidbit her mother’s kente cloth as a final gift and mourns as the wagon pulls away. Mr. Derby reacts by whipping her in anger.

As the group travels, Dr. Hoskins expresses his shame for the injustices of slavery. He provides Amari, Polly, and Tidbit with food, money, and a gun before sending them into the woods, accompanied by Hushpuppy. They travel day and night, but Amari becomes sick after eating some fruits that make them all vomit. Amari’s condition worsens, and she experiences dizziness and nausea. They stop briefly to rest, catching fish and crayfish to survive. One night, Tidbit becomes distraught when Hushpuppy disappears. The next evening, they find a cave to shelter in, but the situation becomes even more frightening when an animal approaches. However, it turns out to be Hushpuppy, who has caught a rabbit. Several days later, they are caught by Clay, who ties Amari up and threatens to punish her for running away. Polly shoots him in the head, grazing his temple, and knocking him out. The girls tie him up, leaving him with a rattlesnake to face his fate.

Afterward, they meet Nathan, a boy who confirms that Fort Mose is real. He hides them in his father’s barn, but they are forced to flee into a swamp when Nathan’s father discovers their presence. Soon after, they encounter Fiona, a woman who owns slaves but offers them help. She sends Besa, one of her slaves, to hitch up a wagon for the runaways, though Besa’s broken spirit prevents him from touching Amari. As they continue their journey, the group encounters a Spanish soldier who pretends to buy Polly’s story, but he secretly gives them important information about Fort Mose and directions to cross the river into Spanish Florida.

Upon reaching the river, Amari, Polly, and Tidbit successfully cross into Spanish territory and are welcomed by Inez, who assures them they are safe. Inez introduces them to Captain Menendez, an escaped slave who decides that Amari will weave while Polly will teach children to read. Inez takes Amari to her new home, where she reveals that Amari is pregnant. Although devastated by the news, Amari vows to cherish the life inside her and share the stories of her ancestors. She finds a sense of peace, knowing that her baby carries the spirits of her mother, father, Kwasi, and the others who perished. Gazing at the copper sun, Amari feels that she has found a place to call home once more.

== Characters ==
- Amari is a strong 15-year-old slave, and the main character who endures the horrors of slavery.
- Polly is a 15-year-old indentured servant that changes her mind about slavery when she meets Amari and sees how they are treated.
- Mrs. Derby is a sweet, affectionate woman and Mr. Derby's 18 year old, second wife. She gets pregnant by Noah, a slave and her bodyguard whom she loves, and Mr. Derby gets so enraged by his wife having a black baby, that he kills Noah and the baby.
- Nathan is a kind young man who helps the children along their journey.
- Noah is a caring, strong young man who is in love with Mrs. Derby, and impregnates Mrs. Derby. He is her bodyguard.
- Besa "Buck" is a drummer from Amari's village and her fiancé who becomes enslaved after the capture.
- Clay is Mr. Derby's son who impregnates Amari. He is left tied to a tree by the children as a rattlesnake is slithering toward him.
- Mr. Derby is the harsh and cruel slave owner who kills Mrs. Derby's baby and Noah.
- Kwasi is Amari's precocious little brother.
- Komla Amari and Kwasi's father is the village storyteller who was murdered during the capture.
- Tidbit is an overly imaginative child. He is also the son of Teenie. He loves Hushpuppy, his dog, very much, and hates the thought of parting with him.
- Afi is Amari's good friend who is like a motherly figure to Amari from the boat to the new land.
- Teenie is Tidbits mother. She was born into slavery. She is the head chef at Derbyshire farms. She helps Amari settle in and gives Amari and Polly jobs to help around the kitchen

== Reception ==
Most critics saw Copper Sun as “unflinching and unforgettable.” Another critic thought of the novel as “character driven, with a fast moving plot, and unforgettable characters.” Agreeing, another critic noted that the novel was "horrific" "multi-faceted" and that "[they were] afraid to turn the page." Beverly Almond noted that the novel expresses “unimaginable hardship” and “starvation and disease.” Another critic claimed that the book showed themes of "pain, hope, and determination" and "human exploitation and suffering." Kirkus Reviews added that the novel showed "cynicism and realistic outlook."

== Awards and nominations ==
Sharon Draper's Copper Sun won the Coretta Scott King award in 2007.

== Bibliography ==
- Draper, Sharon (2006). Copper Sun. New York, New York: Simon Pulse. pp. 302. ISBN 978-1-4169-5348-7.
