= Romiette and Julio =

1999 novel by Sharon Draper

- First edition
- Author: Sharon Draper
- Language: English
- Subject: Interracial relationships
- Genre: Young adult
- Publisher: Atheneum Books
- Publication date: September 1, 1999
- Publication place: United States
- Media type: Book
- Pages: 236
- ISBN: 9780689821806
- Website: http://sharondraper.com/bookdetail.asp?id=7

Romiette and Julio is a young adult novel by Sharon Draper, published in 1999 by Atheneum Books. It is an updated version of Romeo and Juliet by William Shakespeare. Many of the characters in Draper's novel closely parallel those in Shakespeare's play. The plot updates the family feud between the Capulets and Montagues to reflect modern racial tensions between African-Americans and Hispanics in the United States. The book received mixed reviews.

== Plot summary ==
This story begins with African American teenager Romiette Cappelle awaking from a recurring nightmare in which she is drowning in fire and water. Just before waking she hears an unknown male voice speaking to her. Although frightened by the nightmare, she wonders whether the voice could be the voice of her soulmate.

Meanwhile, Julio Montague, a Hispanic teenager has just moved to town (Cincinnati, Ohio) from Corpus Christi, Texas, and the following day is his first day attending the same school as Romiette. On his first day he is involved in an altercation with Ben, a local boy, and the two end up becoming friends after Ben declines to implicate Julio when questioned by the school's principal. When Julio gets home that afternoon, he logs into a chatroom with the screen name "spanishlover" and starts to chat anonymously with "afroqueen," who he later finds is Romiette. Meanwhile, Romiette excitedly tells Destiny, her best friend, about her online chat with "spanishlover." Romiette and Julio continue to chat online, have a lunch date, and eventually fall in love with each other.

Their relationship provokes the ire of a local gang—the "Devil Dogs"—who disapprove of an African American girl dating a Hispanic boy. Makala, a member of the gang, threatens Romiette on several occasions. Julio tells his parents about the relationship, and although his mother, Maria, approves, his father, Luis, dislikes his son dating an African American girl because his first girlfriend was killed by gang members who were African American.

Romiette and Julio struggle with the pressure of their environment's disapprobation, reaching a crisis when the gang threaten them at gunpoint. The two of them meet with Ben and Destiny and concoct a plan to deal with the gang: Romiette and Julio will show their affection in public in order to draw the gang members' attention, while Ben and Destiny will be nearby and armed with a gun, ready to step in and confront them. The plan fails at a critical juncture when the car breaks down, and Romiette and Julio are abducted by the Devil Dogs.

Ben and Destiny go to the Cappelles' home and explain what has happened to Romiette's parents, Lady and Cornell. Lady asks Malaka where the teens are, but Malaka denies knowing where they are. She eventually reveals their location when questioned by the police.

Romiette and Julio turn out to be stranded at the bottom of a boat in London Woods Lake. When lightning strikes, they are separated. Having fallen into the lake, unable to swim, Romiette blacks out and experiences once again her recurring dream. When Julio finds her floating face down, he pulls her to land and finds she is not breathing. As Julio tries to wake her, Romiette recognizes the unknown male voice in her dream as Julio's voice.

== Reception ==
In a mixed review for The New York Times, Simon Rodberg wrote: "Pick a hot-button issue, and you can bet that Sharon M. Draper's Romiette and Julio gives it at least a passing mention. School safety. Immigration. Internet stalkers. Even recycling." and "The two main characters are likable but bland, and in a book so concerned with contemporary ethical instruction, their gender roles come far too directly from the 16th century." Rolling Stone, however, included it on a list of the 40 best young adult novels, and at review website Teen Reads, Cassia Van Arsdale writes that "Draper writes as if she's on the phone with a long lost friend, with informality, intimacy and ease. Both Romi and Julio are so likable I really wanted them to get together, which is always important in a romance."

In their review, Kirkus Reviews wrote: "The parallels to Shakespeare’s play are often self-conscious and belabored, drawn at odd moments in the story. Still, a straightforward, uncluttered narrative will hook readers into the well-paced plot and sympathetic characters; loose ends are tied more neatly than a package, prettying up the ending by putting a happily-ever-after spin on the lovers’ fates."

== Sources ==
- Rodberg, Simon (December 19, 1999). "Romiette and Julio". The New York Times.
- "When Holden Met Katniss: The 40 Best YA Novels". Rolling Stone. May 22, 2014.
- Van Arsdale, Cassia (October 18, 2011). "Romiette and Julio". Teen Reads.
- "Romiette and Julio". Kirkus Reviews. July 15, 1999.
