= November Blues =

2007 young adult novel by Sharon M. Draper

- First edition
- Author: Sharon M. Draper
- Language: English
- Series: Jericho Trilogy
- Genre: Realistic fiction
- Publisher: Atheneum Books
- Publication date: October 23, 2007
- Publication place: United States
- Media type: Print
- Pages: 316 pp
- ISBN: 978-1416906995
- OCLC: 82673248
- Preceded by: The Battle of Jericho
- Followed by: Just Another Hero

November Blues is a young adult novel by Sharon M. Draper, first published in 2007. It's the second novel of the Jericho Trilogy, the sequel to The Battle of Jericho. The book tackles the issue of teen pregnancy and its consequences.

== Plot summary ==
November Nelson is a 16 year-old grieving the death of her boyfriend, Josh Prescott, after a hazing incident went horribly wrong. She discovers that she is pregnant with Josh's child, and must navigate the pressures of telling her family, figuring out how to provide for her child, and handling Josh's anguished parents.

== Awards ==
- 2008 Coretta Scott King Honor Book
- 2008 New York Public Library Best Books for the Teen Age
- 2008 Young Adult Choice Books – International Reading Association
