= Forged by Fire (novel) =

1997 young adult novel by Sharon M. Draper

Forged By Fire
- First edition
- Author: Sharon M. Draper
- Language: English
- Series: Hazelwood High Trilogy
- Subject: Child abuse and Child molestation
- Genre: Realistic fiction
- Publisher: Atheneum Books
- Publication date: January 1, 1997
- Publication place: United States
- Media type: Print
- Pages: 160
- Awards: 1998 Coretta Scott King Author Award
- ISBN: 0-689-80699-X
- Preceded by: Tears of a Tiger
- Followed by: Darkness Before Dawn

Forged by Fire is a realistic fiction novel written by Sharon M. Draper in 1997. It's the second book in the Hazelwood High Trilogy. It received the Coretta Scott King Award.

The story focuses on Gerald Nickelby, an African American boy who struggles with life after the death of his aunt.

Originally, the first chapter of Forged by Fire appeared as a short story in Ebony magazine in January 1991 under the title "One Small Torch."

== Plot summary ==
The story begins with a three-year-old boy named Gerald Nickelby who lives with his single mother Monique. One day, she visits a drug dealer, Mr. Leroy, and leaves Gerald home alone for many, many hours. While he is alone, Gerald goes into her room and picks up a lighter, mistaking it for a toy, and he accidentally sets the house on fire. Afraid, Gerald hides behind the sofa and passes out from smoke inhalation. Gerald later wakes up in a hospital, confused as to what's happening. A few minutes later, Gerald's aunt, Queen, arrives at the hospital and becomes his legal guardian after the incident.

Six years later, Gerald finds out his mother was in jail for leaving him as a three-year-old home alone. She comes to Queen's house on Gerald's ninth birthday, and Gerald finds out that she married a man named Jordan Sparks, and they have a daughter named Angel. After Queen dies, Gerald is forced to move back with his mother, and discovers his stepfather's abusive side.

Jordan starts to molest his daughter Angel. When Gerald finds out, he gets help from Darryl Washington, his friend Robert's father, and gets Jordan sent to prison for his crimes. The story progresses to high school where Gerald is on the basketball team, and Angel is a dancer. Jordan returns from prison and tries to act like he's a changed man, but on the side is drugging up Gerald's mother. Jordan comes home drunk one day and attempts to rape Angel, who was previously cooking food. The stove soon sets the house on fire once more, and after a fight between Gerald and Jordan, the latter dies, and the two children are reunited with their mother and hopeful of a new future together.

== Main characters ==
- Gerald Nickelby - The main protagonist of the story. Armed with a troubled past, Gerald is a character who does not think his life is worth living for. Late in the book, he vows to protect his little sister, literally and figuratively saying she is one of the only sources of happiness in his life. Gerald is also a basketball player, one of the best on his team. In addition, he also has his teammates, mostly his friends, to look forward to.
- Angel Sparks- Gerald's younger half sister in the family. She was born when Monique was in jail for the fire. Her father and grandmother abused her in Atlanta. She loves to sing, dance, and loves her older brother, who she sees as her protector. In the story, she is molested by her father numerous times, to the anger of Gerald. Angel is also seen as the voice of reason in certain parts of the story, giving useful insight to the situations she and her older brother are in. In addition, she loves her cat named Tiger, who she got for Christmas.
- Jordan Sparks - The main antagonist of the story. The husband of Monique, who abuses Gerald, molests and rape Angel, and scream and hit his wife. After being arrested and charged for child molestation, Jordan is released and stays at the apartment, and act like he's changed. He is burned alive and killed after the whole apartment burns down, prior to his fight with Gerald.
- Monique Sparks- Gerald's mother. Abused drugs and Gerald anytime she was high. She often enforced and imparted horrible messages and punishments on Gerald when he was a child (e.g., putting a lighter up dangerously close to his hand after Gerald was playing with it.) When the house burned down after the lighter was left on and unattended, Monique is arrested and charged for child neglect. However, after she is released, her personality changes, even more so once she is hit by a taxi. Her character experiences many mental changes through the story, even refusing to accept Jordan's behavior post-taxi accident.

== Minor characters ==
- Aunt Queen - Gerald's aunt who he has to stay with for most of his childhood, from age 3 to age 9. Some of his fondest memories were made with Aunt Queen. Aunt Queen is a woman defined by her character, though towards her exposition with the nurse showed she can be rude, her philosophy is one of kindness and love in general. She helps suppress Gerald's memories, and the abyss of pain that follows. Because of arthritis, Aunt Queen uses a wheelchair.
- Robbie "Rob" Washington - Gerald's friend and closest confidant. They had been best friends for a while in the book. They are also on the basketball team together. Later in the story, one night, the friends (except Gerald) are out for a fun night after the basketball game, when they get into a car crash, with Rob dying, while everyone else survives.
- Mr. Washington - Rob's father. Around the early-middle portion of the book, he starts to bond with Gerald. Gerald starts to reveal his home life, with Mr. Washington offering to help. As promised, Mr. Washington helped Gerald and Angel put Jordan in jail. When Rob died, Mr. Washington comforted Gerald. He's seen as a father figure to Gerald.
- B.J. Carson - One of Gerald's friends who can turn passive-aggressive if anyone in the book made a mockery of him. He even learned karate to look intimidating due to his short stature not accommodating for his personality.
- Andy Jackson - another one of Gerald's friends on the basketball team. Cause of the car crash, of which was caused by drunk driving, and Rob's premature death. After the car crash, Andy was the victim of much harassment at school, and suffered from all the depression and pain.
- Tyrone Mills - a 17-year old basketball player from Hazel wood High School that has been hanging out with Andy, Gerald, Rob, and B.J. since the seventh grade. He's dating Rhonda.
