= The Pact (2002 book) =

Book by The Three Doctors

The Pact: Three Young Men Make a Promise and Fulfill a dream
- First edition
- Author: Sampson Davis, George Jenkins, Rameck Hunt, Lisa Frazier
- Language: English
- Genre: Non-fiction, autobiography
- Publisher: Riverhead Trade
- Publication date: May 23, 2002
- Publication place: United States
- Media type: Print (paperback) and e-book
- Pages: 272 pages
- ISBN: 1-57322-989-X

The Pact: Three Young Black Men Make a Promise and Fulfill a Dream is a 2002 New York Times Bestselling non-fiction autobiography by Sampson Davis, George Jenkins, Rameck Hunt, and Lisa Frazier. The book was first published on May 23, 2002 through Riverhead Trade and was later republished through Prentice Hall. The Pact covers the lives of Davis, Jenkins, and Hunt, three young black men who made a pact to graduate from college and become doctors rather than to succumb to the violence in their community. In 2003 the book won a Books for a Better Life Award for "First Book", also being named one of the Library Journal's "Best Audiobooks of 2002".

The Pact was later followed up with the companion books The Bond and We Beat the Street.

== Synopsis ==
The Pact narrates the lives of Rameck Hunt, Sampson Davis, and George Jenkins, three young black men that grew up in a community of violence, ignorance, and failure. The book shows their first-hand experience of racism and the low expectations for their future. Eventually the three make a promise that one day they will not only graduate from college, but that they will graduate as doctors. They later receive a scholarship to Seton Hall University, although the process proves to be a difficult one. Despite managing to overcome enough obstacles to gain a scholarship and attend college, they still run into racism, mediocrity, and failure. At one point the group debates giving up and dropping out of college, but are talked out of it by the school's guidance counselor, Carla Dickson. They then decide to face their obstacles in more adequate ways and graduate from Seton Hall. The three then study to become doctors, with Hunt and Davis deciding to attend medical school while Jenkins decides to become a dentist. The book ends with all three of them passing and earning their medical degrees at their respective schools.

== Reception ==
Critical reception for The Pact has been positive, with many schools utilizing it in their lesson plans. Publishers Weekly praised the book, calling its urgency "undeniable". AudioFile criticized the narration for the audiobook, writing that "Since they presumably wrote the book, they should be able to emphasize words to get their meanings across. Instead, they read flatly, forcing us, at times, to grapple with context and intent."

== Documentary ==
In 2006 a documentary focusing on the three doctors was released through Spark Media and directed by Sylvia Holmes. The Pact was shown at the Boston International Film Festival and has been positively received by critics.
