= Tears of a Tiger =

1994 novel by Sharon Draper

- Author: Sharon Draper
- Illustrator: Simon Pulse
- Cover artist: Andreus Green
- Series: Hazelwood High Trilogy
- Genre: Realistic fiction
- Published: October 1, 1994
- Publisher: Atheneum
- Publication place: United States
- Media type: Print (hardcover)
- Pages: 180
- ISBN: 978-0-689-80698-8
- Followed by: Forged by Fire

Tears of a Tiger is a young adult novel written by Sharon Draper. It was first published by Atheneum in 1994, and later on February 1, 1996 by Simon Pulse, and is the first book of the Hazelwood High Trilogy. It depicts the story of a seventeen-year-old African American boy named Andrew "Andy" Jackson, who feels deeply guilty for inadvertently causing his best friend Robert "Rob" Washington's death through drunk driving. The story is told through multiple different formats such as journal entries, first person narratives, and newspaper articles.

== Plot summary ==
Andy Jackson, a seventeen-year-old student, just won a basketball game at Hazelwood High School, and he and his friends Robbie Washington, Tyrone Mills, and B.J. Carson decide to ride home in Andy's Chevrolet Chevette. While they ride, they decide to drink with Andy still driving. However, Andy accidentally crashes his car, and the resulting accident causes an explosion. Andy, Tyrone, and B.J. all escape but are not able to save Robbie, who burns to death in the wreckage.

After getting out of the hospital, Andy's license and car are taken away, and he soon begins the grieving process. Coach Ripley, the basketball coach, gives him advice, and Andy takes Rob's place as team captain. He starts talking to Dr. Carrothers, a psychologist, but it becomes clear he's hiding his true feelings about what happened as he is pretending he's fine.

Andy's depression soon gets worse as it impacts his schoolwork and mental state. While staying home to watch his 6-year-old brother, Monty, Andy has a nightmare where Rob is blaming him for his death. Andy's girlfriend, Keisha, notices little by little that his depression is a lot worse than he says it is, but doesn't tell anyone. After long days of her comforting him, she feels like he has everyone fooled, Dr. Carrothers, his parents, and Coach Ripley, everyone other than her. His emotions soon become far too much for her to handle alone, and she feels like he depends on her. She breaks up with him, declaring to her friend, Rhonda, she never wants to see him again.

On the same day, Andy stays at home instead of going to school and kills himself with a shotgun due to depression. His mother and Monty walk in on his body, while various people at school spread their condolences; students write him letters, Tyrone is unable to forget the night Rob died, Gerald shows anger about the suicide, Rhonda is curious if Andy was considering how suicide would affect his family, and Keisha is horrified that Andy died and her desire came true. B.J. prays for Andy, hoping he'll go to Heaven, no matter how stupid he acted. While sitting at Andy's grave, Monty reflects that Andy left too soon before he could teach him anything important, and expresses that he'll miss him.

== Development ==
Draper conceived the book's style and format in different ways. She chose to use different writing modes that students are expected to become familiar with to achieve language proficiency, as she intended it to be used as a teaching tool for writing as well as figurative language, symbolism, and style. Modes used in the book include diary entries, personal essays, letters, notes, newspaper articles, teacher conversations, and morning school announcements.
