= The Three Doctors (motivational speakers) =

African-American motivational speakers, authors, and doctors

Drs. Sampson Davis, Rameck Hunt, and George Jenkins
- Education: Postgraduate school
- Alma mater: Seton Hall University
- Occupations: doctors, authors, and speakers
- Writing career
- Genres: Autobiography, Motivational
- Website: www.threedoctors.com

The Three Doctors is a group of African-American motivational speakers, authors, and doctors.

== Origins ==
The trio is made up of Dr. Rameck Hunt, Dr. Sampson Davis, and Dr. George Jenkins. All three grew up in Newark, New Jersey without fathers and first met as schoolmates at University High School. The three grew up in public housing and came from low-income families. During high school, the three made a pact to get through high school, college, and medical school successfully and credit school counselor Carla Dickson with guiding them through their tumultuous teenage years. They attended the pre-medicine/pre-dental course at Seton Hall University on a scholarship program.

=== Rameck Hunt ===
Hunt's mother was a drug addict, and he was mostly raised by his grandmother. He struggled through school, (Plainfield High School)frequently getting into trouble and had anger management issues. While in high school he befriended Davis and Jenkins and resolved to turn his life around. After completing premedical studies at Seton Hall University, he attended Robert Wood Johnson Medical School (RWJMS), then part of the University of Medicine and Dentistry of New Jersey, and completed his residency in internal medicine at Robert Wood Johnson University Hospital. He is currently a board-certified internist at University Medical Center of Princeton and an assistant professor at RWJMS.

=== Sampson Davis ===
Davis, the fifth of six children, grew up in a neighborhood notorious for crime and drugs. He excelled in school and has said that education "saved his life". Like Hunt, he completed medical school at RWJMS. He then completed his residency in emergency medicine at Newark Beth Israel Medical Center. Dr. Davis now covers several emergency departments in New Jersey. He is the medical director of several urgent care facilities as well as substance abuse facilities. Dr. Davis resides in New Jersey with his two sons .

=== George Jenkins ===
Jenkins was born on February 6, 1973, in Newark. He was inspired to become a dentist after a visit to the dentist's office for braces when he was a teenager. After undergraduate studies at Seton Hall, he completed his D.M.D. at University of Medicine and Dentistry of New Jersey. He is an assistant professor of clinical dentistry at Columbia University.

== Speaking ==
The members of the group rarely speak individually; they usually speak as a group. They speak throughout the United States at different venues and times of the year. They also accept requests to speak at private venues, such as schools.

== Books ==
- The Pact. Riverhead. 2002. ISBN 9781573222167.
- We Beat the Street. Penguin. 2005. ISBN 978-0142406274.
- The Bond. Riverhead. 2007. ISBN 9781594489570.

== See also ==
- The Pact (2006 film)
