= Out of My Mind (novel) =

2010 novel by Sharon Draper

- Book Cover for Out of My Mind
- Author: Sharon M. Draper
- Cover artist: Debra Sfetsios-Conover
- Language: English
- Genre: Realistic fiction
- Set in: United States
- Publisher: Atheneum Books For Young Readers, Simon & Schuster
- Publication date: 9 March 2010
- Publication place: United States
- Media type: Print (hardcover, paperback), eBook, audiobook
- Pages: 295
- ISBN: 978-1-4169-7170-2

Out of My Mind is a book written by Sharon M. Draper, a New York Times bestselling author. The book is recommended for ages 10–14 and for grades 5–8. The story was written in first person, featuring Melody Brooks, a girl with cerebral palsy. The novel discusses themes of inclusion and ableism. It has been widely used in classrooms for its recognition of diverse forms of intelligence and portrayal of disability. The novel was adapted into a film that premiered in 2024 and is now available on Disney+.

== Summary ==
The Book Out of my Mind is about Melody Brooks who is an eleven year old girl whose parents have done everything they can to help her live well, but it is still often frustrating for her since, due to cerebral palsy, she can neither speak nor move much. Her mother enrolls her in special education at Spaulding Street Elementary School, where she and her class (H–5) are repeatedly taught the alphabet. She knows much more than that, but she cannot say she wants a better challenge, either verbally or by writing. Meanwhile, her neighbor, Mrs. V, teaches her to crawl and to do the best she can.

When Melody was eight, her mother became pregnant with her sister, who she now envies for being able-bodied. After the school gets her a communication device and a teacher aide (Catherine), she can better participate in the inclusion program.

She befriends Rose Spencer. She is bullied by two girls named Molly and Claire, who believe that her physical disability also implies an intellectual one. When she joins a trivia team known as the Whiz Kids, she gets a perfect score on the practice test, but they argue that she cheated because of this belief. She then participates in the qualifying exam to be part of the trivia competition and makes the team. On the day the group is to fly to Washington, D.C., Melody learns that while her noon flight has been canceled due to snow, the rest of the team took the 9:00 AM flight.

The following day Melody insists on going to school, and as she gets ready, she realizes that Penny has slipped out of the house, so she hits, kicks and screams in an attempt to warn her mother, who fails to understand. This results in Penny being run over and injured. Melody feels guilty, but learns that Penny will recover. On Monday, her class apologizes for their lack of consideration by giving her the small trophy that they won. However, she laughs at them and breaks it, before leaving the room. The next day, she and Catherine begin work on her autobiography project for school, the introductory paragraph of which is the first few lines of the book.

== Analysis and themes ==
A central theme in Out of My Mind is societal assumptions surrounding disability. Scholars have pointed out that the novel emphasizes how social barriers can limit opportunities for disabled individuals, rather than the disability itself. Overall, the novel highlights diversity, access, and the need for more inclusive environments for disabled individuals.

== Awards and achievements ==
- Winner of the 2011 Bank Street College of Education Josette Frank Award
- Texas Bluebonnet Award 2011-2012 Master List
- Cooperative Children's Book Center (CCBC) Choice of 2011
- 2013 Young Hoosier Book Award (Middle Grade)
- 2011 Buckeye Children's and Teen Book Award for Grades 6–8 from Ohio
- 2011–2012 Maryland Black-Eyed Susan Book Award for Grades 6–9
- A NCTE Notable Children's Book in the Language Arts

== Film ==
The movie adaptation of Out of My Mind premiered in January 2024. Written by Daniel Stiepleman and directed by Amber Sealey, this film is a Disney Channel original, based on the bestselling novel by Sharon M. Draper.

== Reception ==
The novel received starred reviews from School Library Journal, Booklist, and Kirkus Reviews. Kirkus Reviews praised the book as "rich in detail of both the essential normalcy and the difficulties of a young person with cerebral palsy", and "descriptions of both Melody's challenges—'Going to the bathroom at school just plain sucks'—and the insensitivities of some are unflinching and realistic". Booklist stated that Out of My Mind is "a book that defies age categorization, an easy enough read for upper-elementary students yet also a story that will enlighten and resonate with teens and adults". The Bulletin said the novel "[Will make] students think twice about their classmates, acquaintances, and siblings with special needs".The Denver Post powerfully concluded their review: "if there's only one book teens and parents (and everyone else) can read this year, Out of My Mind should be it". "Out of My Mind is a powerfully eye-opening book," claims The Horn Book, "with both an unforgettable protagonist and a rich cast of fully realized, complicated background characters". According to The Washington Post, "author Sharon Draper creates an authentic character who insists, through her lively voice and indomitable will, that the reader become fully involved with the girl in the pink wheelchair". Most of the reception has been positive, with the exception of Publishers Weekly, who criticized that there was a "lack of tension in the plot", although it was "resolved halfway through".

Awards
Preceded by Runaway Twin	Mark Twain Award; 2013	Succeeded by The Unwanteds
