= Sharon M. Draper =

American author and educator (born 1948)

Sharon M Draper
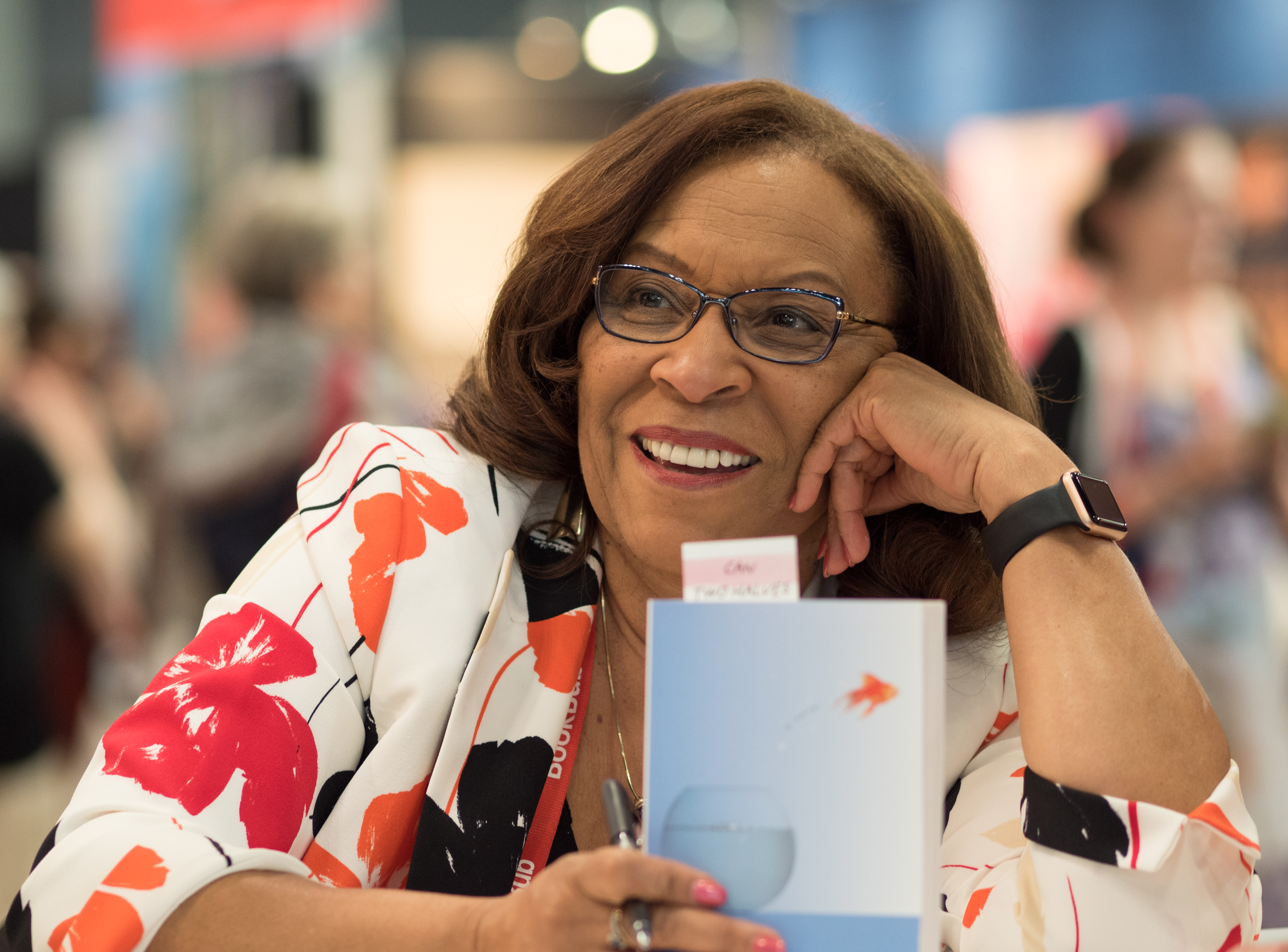
- Draper at BookExpo America in 2018
- Born: August 21, 1948 (age 78); Cleveland, Ohio, U.S.
- Education: Pepperdine University (BD) Miami University of Ohio (MA)
- Writing career
- Notable work: See § Works
- Notable awards: National Teacher of the Year (1997); Margaret A. Edwards Award (2015); Charlotte Huck Award (2016)
- Website: Official website

Sharon Mills Draper (born August 21, 1948) is an American children's writer, professional educator, and the 1997 National Teacher of the Year. She is a two-time winner of the Coretta Scott King Award for books about the young and adolescent African-American experience. She is known for her Hazelwood and Jericho series, Copper Sun, Double Dutch, Out of My Mind and Romiette and Julio.

== Personal life ==
Draper was born in Cleveland, Ohio, to Victor D. Mills and Catherine Gachett Mills. She is the eldest of three. Growing up, she played the piano and loved to read. By eleven, she had read nearly every children's book in her local library and was given a special library card in order to be allowed to check out adult books.

Draper earned her bachelor's degree, majoring in English, from Pepperdine University and her Master of Arts degree in English from Miami University of Ohio in 1974. Post-graduation, she began teaching in Cincinnati public schools. During this time she became locally famous for her "Draper Paper", a challenging research paper assigned to graduating seniors.

She is married and has four children. Her own writing career began in 1990 when, as a teacher, she was challenged by a ninth-grade student to "write something". She entered a short story entitled "One Small Torch" to a writing contest through Ebony magazine. Upon winning, Draper was awarded five thousand dollars and her story was published. Among those who wrote to congratulate her was Roots author Alex Haley. She credits this letter with helping her realize that she could be a writer. In 2000, she retired from teaching in order to spend more time on her writing. Draper lives in Cincinnati with her husband.

== Awards and honors ==
=== Personal awards ===
Sharon Draper has two Coretta Scott King Author Awards (1998 for Forged by Fire, 2007 for Copper Sun), two Author Honor Awards (2004 for The Battle of Jericho, 2008 for November Blues), and won the inaugural John Steptoe Award for New Talent in 1995 for Tears of a Tiger.

She was National Teacher of the Year in 1997, and the Ohio State Department of Education named her Ohio Pioneer in Education.

Draper was awarded the Milken Family Foundation National Educator Award in 1997. She was also a YWCA Career Woman of Achievement, received the Dean's Award from Howard University School of Education, was recognized with the Pepperdine University Distinguished Alumnus Award, received the Marva Collins Education Excellence Award, and earned the Governor's Educational Leadership Award.

In 1998 Draper was the Duncanson Artist-in-Residence for the Taft Museum.

She was chosen as one of four authors to speak at the Library of Congress's 2006 National Book Festival in Washington D.C. and represented the United States at the National Book Festival in Moscow.

Draper received the Beacon of Light Humanitarian award in 2008.

In 2011, she received the 33rd annual Jeremiah Ludington Memorial Award by the Educational and Media Association. She donated her $2,500 prize money to Starfire Council of Greater Cincinnati.

She received the Margaret A. Edwards Award from the American Library Association in 2015.

=== Book awards ===
Tears of a Tiger earned Draper the John Steptoe Award for New Talent in 1995. It has been recognized as one of the best of the year by the Children's Book Council, the New York City Library, Bank Street College, and the National Council for Social Studies. It was also named as Best of the Best by VOYA.

Forged by Fire, the sequel to Tears of a Tiger, was the 1997 Coretta Scott King Award winner, and was also honored as a 1998 ALA Best Book for Young Adults. It also received the Parent's Choice Award and the Indiana Young Hoosier Award.

Darkness Before Dawn, the third book in the trilogy, is an ALA Top Ten Quick Pick, and has received the Children's Choice Award from the International Reading Association and received the Buckeye Book Award for 2005, and was named an IRA Young Adult Choice for 2003.

Romiette and Julio is also listed as an ALA Best Book and has been selected by the International Reading Association as a 2000 Notable Book for a Global Society, and by the New York Public Library in their Books for the Teen Age.

Out of My Mind was chosen the winner of the 2013 Sasquatch Reading Award by the readers of Washington State and the 2013 Bluestem Award by the third through fifth graders of Illinois. It won the 2013 California Young Reader Medal and the 2013 Nevada Young Readers Award. It also received the 2011 Sunshine State Young Readers Award. It was a 2011 IRA Young Adult Choice.

Double Dutch was honored as a Notable Social Studies Trade Book for Young People by the Children's Book Council as well as one of the top ten sports books for young adults for 2003 by the ALA, and Best of the Best for 2004, and received the Sunshine State Young Readers Award for 2006.

The Battle of Jericho received a 2004 Coretta Scott King Author Honor, one of the New York Public Library's Book for the Teen Age, and is one of the 2005 Young Adult Choice Books named by the International Reading Association.

Fire from the Rock has been selected by the NCSS-CBC Notable Social Studies Committee as a Notable Social Studies Trade Book for Young People for 2008 and is honored on the 2008 New York Public Library Best Books for the Teen Age.

We Beat the Street is listed on the New York Times Bestseller List and is on VOYA's Non-Fiction Honor List for 2006 and is honored on the 2006 New York Public Library Best Books for the Teen Age.

Copper Sun received the 2007 Coretta Scott King Award, was named as one of the Top Ten Historical Fiction Books for Youth by Booklist was nominated for the 2007 NAACP Image Award for Literature, and received the Ohioana Award for Young Adult Literature. Copper Sun is also a CBC/NCSS Notable Social Studies Trade Book, received the Heartland Award for Excellence in YA Literature, was named as an IRA Notable Book for a Global Society and was named as Best Book of the Year by School Library Journal. Copper Sun is also listed on the New York Times Bestseller List and was selected by the US State Department and the International Reading Association as the United States novel for the international reading project called Reading Across Continents. Students in the US, Nigeria, and Ghana are reading the book and sharing ideas.

November Blues received a 2008 Coretta Scott King Author Honor and is honored on the 2008 New York Public Library Best Books for the Teen Age.

Sassy: Little Sister Is Not My Name! received the 2009 Parents Choice Award.

Panic was selected as a YALSA Quick Picks for Reluctant Young Readers, and a 2014 IRA Young Adult Choice.

Stella by Starlight was selected as the 2016 NCTE Charlotte Huck Award Winner.

Blended was a New York Times Best Seller in 2019.

== Works ==
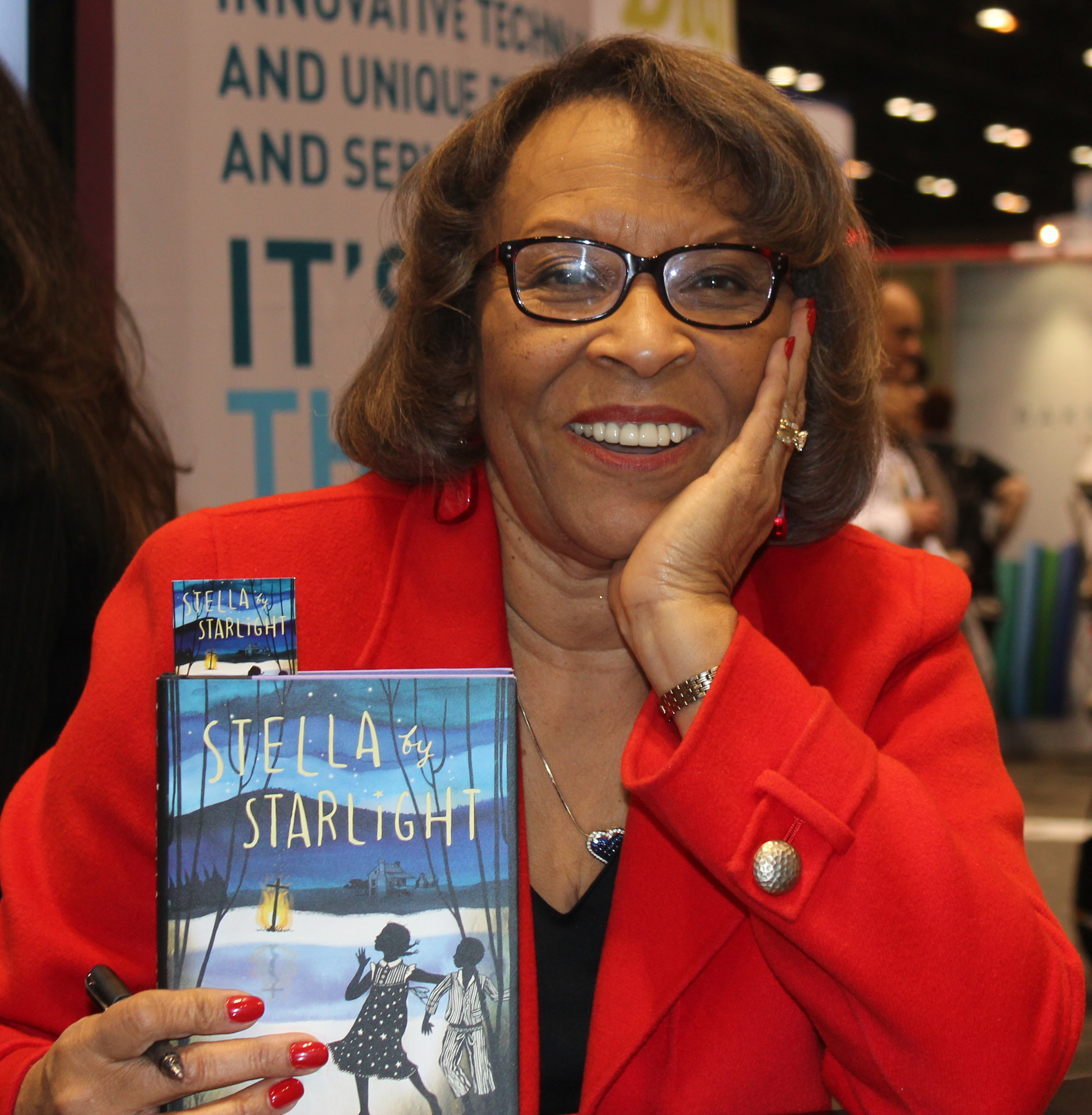
Draper in 2015

=== Hazelwood High Trilogy ===
- Tears of a Tiger (Simon & Schuster, 1994) ISBN 9780689318788
- Forged by Fire (S&S, 1997) ISBN 9780689806995
- Darkness Before Dawn (S&S, 2001) ISBN 9780689830808

=== Jericho series ===
- The Battle of Jericho (S&S, 2003) ISBN 9780756939267
- November Blues (S&S, 2007) ISBN 9781416906988
- Just Another Hero (S&S, 2009) ISBN 9781416995210

=== Sassy series ===
1. Sassy: Little Sister Is Not My Name (Scholastic Press, 2009)
2. Sassy: The Birthday Storm (Scholastic, 2009)
3. Sassy: The Silver Secret (Scholastic, 2010)
4. Sassy: The Dazzle Disaster Dinner Party (Scholastic, 2010)

=== Ziggy and the Black Dinosaurs series ===
1. The Buried Bones Mystery (S&S, 1994)
2. Lost in the Tunnel of Time (S&S, 1996)
3. Shadows of Caesar's Creek (S&S, 1997)
4. The Space Mission Adventure (S&S, 2006)
5. The Backyard Animal Show (S&S, 2006)
6. Stars and Sparks on Stage (S&S, 2007)

=== Out of my Mind trilogy ===
- Out of My Mind (S&S 2010)
- Out of my Heart (S&S 2021)
- Out of my Dreams (S&S 2024)

=== Standalone novels ===
- Romiette and Julio (S&S, 1999) ISBN 9781442428850
- Jazzimagination: a journal to read and write (Scholastic, 1999) ISBN 043906130X
- Drum Beats (Scholastic, 2001) cowritten with Charlene Potts
- Double Dutch (S&S, 2002) ISBN 9780689842313
- Copper Sun (S&S, 2006) ISBN 9780689821813
- Fire from the Rock (Dutton Children's Books, 2007) ISBN 9780525477204
- Panic (Atheneum Books, 2013) ISBN 9781442408982
- Stella by Starlight (Atheneum Books, 2015) ISBN 9781442494992
- Blended (Atheneum Books/Caitlyn Dlouhy, 2018) ISBN 9781432874087

=== Non-fiction ===
- Teaching from the Heart: reflections, encouragement, and inspiration (Portsmouth, NH: Heinemann, 2000), LCCN 99-39534
- Not Quite Burned Out, But Crispy around the Edges: inspiration, laughter, and encouragement for teachers (Heinemann, 2001), LCCN 2001-20423
- We Beat the Street (Dutton, 2005)

=== Poetry ===
- Let the Circle Be Unbroken: collected poetry for children and young adults (Sharon M. Draper, 1997) ISBN 978-1881786801
- Buttered Bones (Sharon M. Draper, 1997) ISBN 978-1881786757

== Themes ==
Many of Draper's books for children and young adults contain mature and serious themes, such as death, grief, and abuse. Draper has said that she uses these themes as they are "the realities of life" for many young people. One major theme touched on in Draper's Out of My Mind, which tells the story of a young girl with cerebral palsy, is young people and disabilities.

Another major theme in Draper's books, such as Forged by Fire and Romiette and Julio, is race. In Romiette and Julio, an African American girl and Hispanic boy begin dating, despite familial disapproval and threats from a local gang. Zonnenberg states that the story's focus on complex issues such as gang violence and interracial relationships encourages deep discussion by all readers. While Romiette and Julio puts the main characters' races at the forefront of the plot, Price notes that Draper takes the opposite approach in Forged by Fire. Price writes that while many characters in this book are African American, Draper focuses more on character actions. Because Draper centers more on narrative and character development, readers come away with a sense that race and ethnicity make up only one part of an individual's identity. Other novels by Draper that focus on race include Fire from the Rock, Stella by Starlight, and Blended.
